= Jeffreys Lewis =

American actress

Mary Jeffreys Lewis
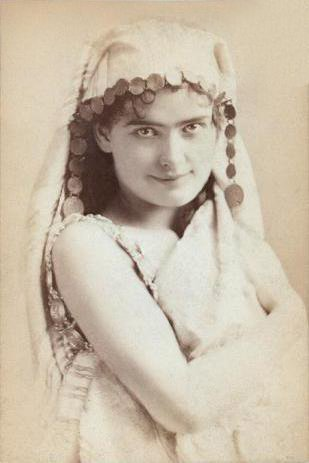
- Born: 25 October 1852; London, England, U.K.
- Died: 28 April 1926 (aged 73); New York City, U.S.A.
- Other name: Jeffreys-Lewis
- Occupation: Stage actress
- Years active: 1873–1926
- Spouses: A. J. Maitland; Harry Mainhall
- Children: Harry Mainhall Jr.

Mary Jeffreys Lewis (abt. 1852–1926) known professionally as Jeffreys Lewis was a British-born American actress whose career lasted long after her popularity as a leading lady had faded.

== Early life ==
Mary Jeffreys Lewis was born in London, England, on 25 October 1852 to Irish parents of Welsh descent. Some sources give her birth year as 1855 or later, though if correct, early US census indicate she was most likely born around 1852. Lewis attended elocution classes at the Birkbeck Institute (now Birkbeck, University of London) and made her first stage appearance at the Theatre Royal in Edinburgh, Scotland. She was brought to America in 1873, probably with her mother, May, and sisters, Catherine and Constance, with veteran British actor Thomas C. King to perform on the New York stage. Her Broadway debut came on the 11 September 1873, at the New Lyceum Theatre on 14th Street and 6th Ave., playing Esmeralda opposite King's Quasimodo in Notre Dame, a failed dramatic adaption of Victor Hugo's The Hunchback of Notre-Dame.

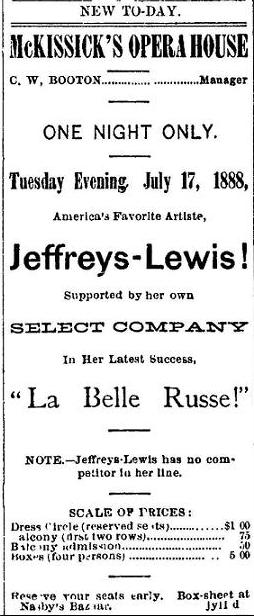
Reno Evening Gazette (1888)

== Career ==
Lewis’ work in Notre Dame caught the eye of John Lester Wallack and before year's end she was playing Miss Grantham in Samuel Foote's comedy The Liar at Wallack's Theatre on Broom Street and Broadway. Lewis stayed with Wallack for a season appearing in The Rivals by Richard Brinsley Sheridan, Central Park, by John Lester Wallack, The Veteran, The School by T. W. Robertson, The Shaughraun by Dion Boucicault and Rafael, an adaptation of the French play Les Filles de Marbres by Théodore Barrière.

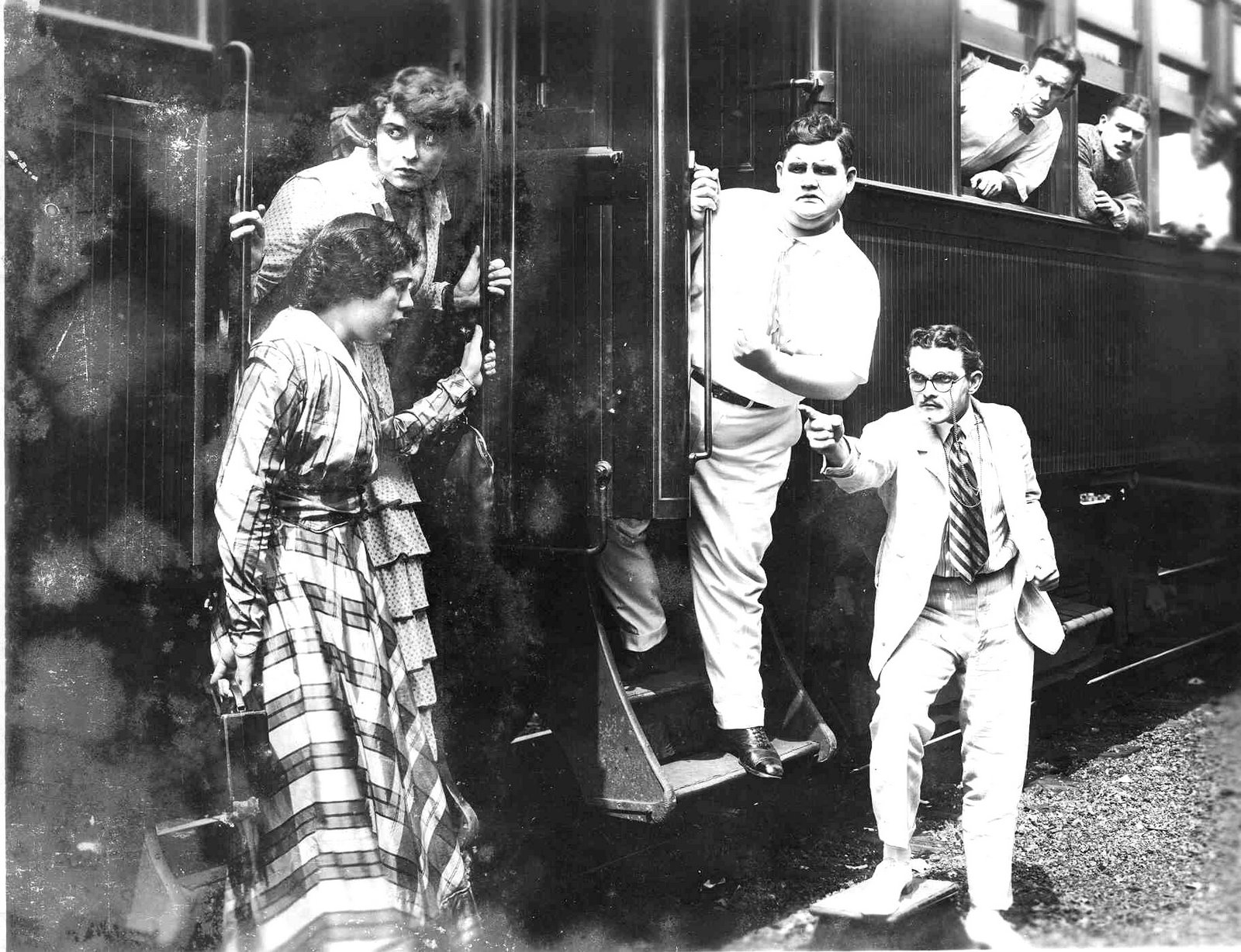
Harry Mainhall Jr., pointing, son of Mary Jeffreys Lewis. Co-starring with Lolita Robertson, in patterned dress and Oliver Hardy, on train steps, in a 1915 silent comedy The New Adventures of J. Rufus Wallingford.

The following few seasons were spent with Augustin Daly's company and as a stock player at the Broadway Theatre on Broadway and 30th Street before touring the West with Daly's company and finding success in California. In the mid-1880s she embarked on a tour of Australia and possibly New Zealand for a seasons or two. Upon her return she gained popularity appearing in big cities and small as Beatrice in La Belle Russe an adaptation of a story by May Agnes Fleming, Martha Moulton in Forget-Me-Not by Herman Merivale, the Countess Clothilde in Clothilde, an adaption of a play by Victorien Sardou, the Countess Zieka in Diplomacy by Victorien Sardou and as Muriel in The Sporting Duchess by Sir Augustus Harris, Cecil Raleigh and Henry Hamilton.

Jeffreys Lewis’ career began to wane in the late 1880s as she continued to play roles that audiences deemed inappropriate for someone approaching middle age. Eventually, though, she adjusted and became a character actress playing supporting roles, a move that extended her career well into her later years.

== Marriage ==
Jeffreys Lewis married actor John Adolf Maitland (aka A. J. Maitland) in San Francisco on 14 August 1878. This marriage ended in divorce nine years later amid charges of infidelity and cruelty. On 13 March 1887 she married actor Harry Mainhall in Oakland, California. Their son, Harry Mainhall Jr., who inherited his mother's cleft chin, would go on to be a Hollywood actor and writer active in the early years of the silent era. Harry Mainhall Sr. died in Los Angeles on 7 November 1902 after battling tuberculosis.

== Death ==
Mary Jeffreys Lewis died on 28 April 1926 in New York City. Her last appearance on stage was in October of the previous year playing Mrs. Schenck in Crane Wilbur's play Easy Terms at New York's National Theater. She was survived by her son, who would follow her in death five years later. Jeffreys Lewis was interred at the Kensico Cemetery in Valhalla, New York.
