= The Sporting Duchess =

The Sporting Duchess may refer to:

- The Sporting Duchess (play), 1895 play on which 1915 and 1920 films are based
- The Sporting Duchess (1915 film), a lost silent film drama
- The Sporting Duchess (1920 film), a lost American silent drama film
