= Percy Anderson (designer) =

English artist (1851–1928)

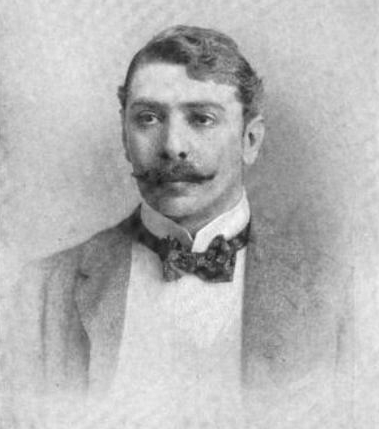
Portrait of Anderson published in 1900

Percy Anderson (22 March 1851 – 30 October 1928) was an English stage designer and painter, best known for his work for the D'Oyly Carte Opera Company, Sir Herbert Beerbohm Tree's company at His Majesty's Theatre and Edwardian musical comedies.

== Life and career ==
Anderson design for The Gondoliers, 1917

Anderson was born on 22 March 1851 at Willesden, North West London. His first significant production was the comic opera Lady of the Locket, composed by William Fullerton Jr. with a libretto by Henry Hamilton. Beginning with The Yeomen of the Guard (1888), Anderson designed the costumes for all the original productions of the Savoy Operas. He continued to design costumes for D'Oyly Carte revivals in the early twentieth century, including for Trial by Jury, H.M.S. Pinafore, The Pirates of Penzance, Patience, Iolanthe, Princess Ida, Ruddigore, The Yeomen of the Guard, and The Gondoliers. For Herbert Beerbohm Tree at His Majesty's Theatre, Anderson designed Twelfth Night, The Merry Wives of Windsor, Richard II, King John, A Midsummer Night's Dream, The Tempest, and two plays by Stephen Phillips, Herod and Ulysses. He designed the costumes for Henry James's ill-fated theatrical effort, Guy Domville; The Times was not impressed by either the play or the costumes.

Among Anderson's other successes were Trelawny of the "Wells" (1898), Merrie England (1902), Véronique (1904), the hit British premiere of The Merry Widow in 1907, Fallen Fairies (1909), Kismet (1911) and Chu Chin Chow (1916). He designed the costumes for various productions of Edwardian musical comedies for George Edwardes, such as the hit musicals The Geisha (1896), A Greek Slave (1898) and San Toy (1899), and The Duchess of Dantzic (1903). The Royal Opera House commissioned Anderson to design costumes in 1900. Anderson's designs were also used in a number of Broadway productions.

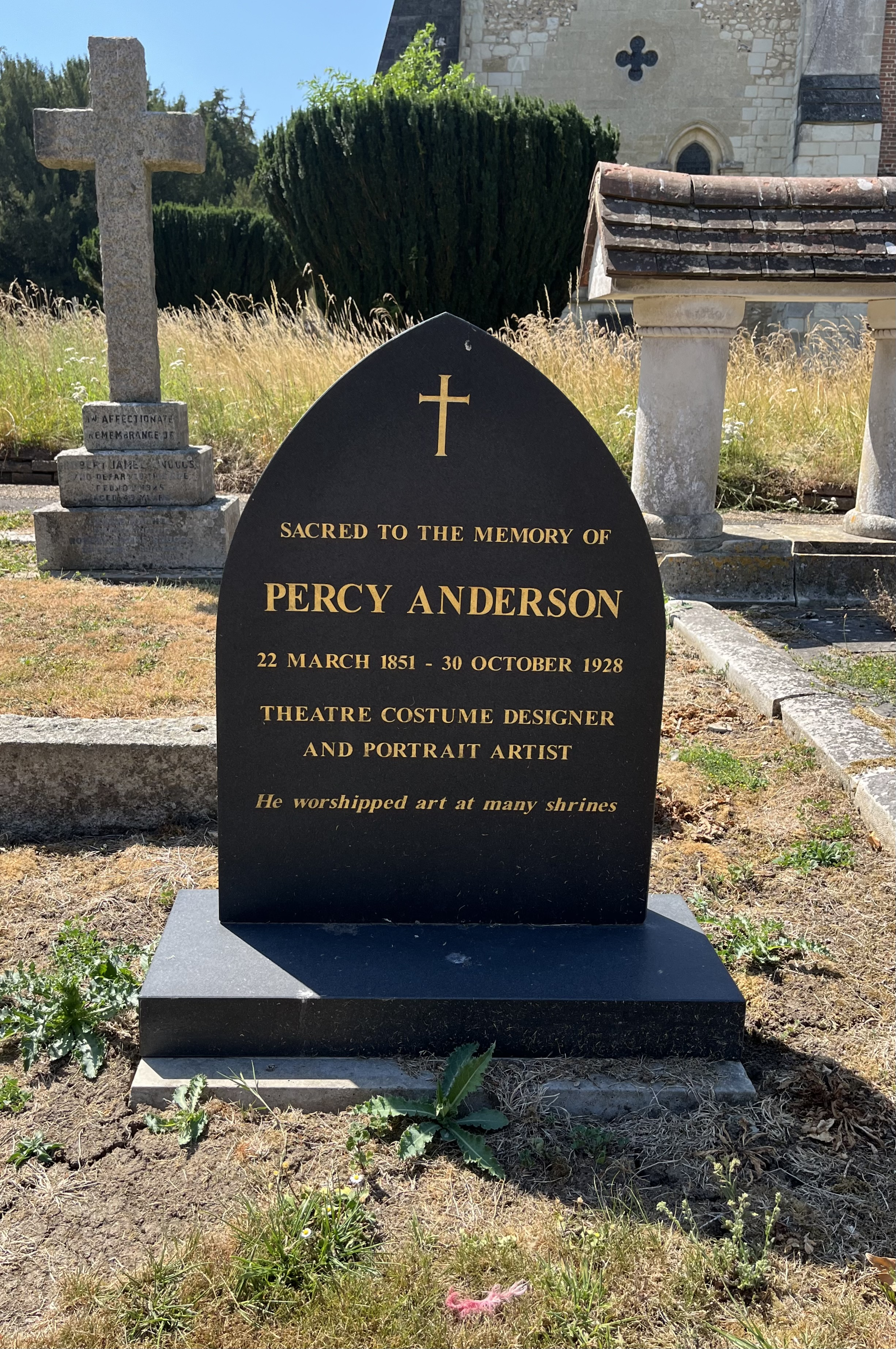
Anderson's grave in All Saint's Churchyard, Crondall, Hampshire

Anderson had private means, and for a time roomed with Morton Fullerton. He was part of a circle of rich, artistic homosexual men, who included Lord Ronald Gower, the courtier Alec Yorke and Hamilton Aïdé. In the 1910s, Anderson was closely associated with the young novelist Hugh Walpole.

The Times, in its obituary notice, said that Anderson "escaped from the pedantry of his predecessors and paved the way in the most interesting manner" for a new generation of designers such as Bakst, Claud Lovat Fraser and Edward Gordon Craig. As a young painter, Anderson achieved a modest success, and his portraits hang in the collections of the National Portrait Gallery, the Louvre, and the British Museum. He illustrated the 1907 book, Costume: Fanciful, Historical and Theatrical.

Anderson died in King's College Hospital, London, in 1928, aged 77. In 2020 The Music Hall Guild of Great Britain and America erected a memorial at his unmarked grave in All Saint's Churchyard, Crondall, Hampshire.

== Notes ==
Anderson's costume for King Gama in Princess Ida, 1921
