= White heather =

White heather may refer to:

- Cassiope tetragona known by common names white Arctic mountain heather and Arctic white heather
- Cassiope mertensiana known by common name white mountain heather
- White forms of Calluna vulgaris
- The White Heather, a 1919 film, based on a play of the same name
- The White Heather (play), an 1897 play
- A blended whisky by Chivas Brothers containing malt whisky from Glenallachie distillery
- The White Heather Club, a Scottish TV programme
