= The Whip (play) =

1909 melodrama

The Whip is a melodrama by Henry Hamilton and Cecil Raleigh, first performed in 1909 at the Drury Lane Theatre in London. The play's original production had intricate scenery and spectacular stage effects, including a horse race and a train crash. There were later productions in the United States and Australia, and the play inspired two silent films.

== Reception ==
Tallulah Bankhead offers a reminiscence of attending The Whip at the Manhattan Opera House as a child:

The Whip was a blood-and-thunder melodrama in four acts and fourteen scenes imported from London's Drury Lane Theatre. It boiled with villainy and violence. Its plot embraced a twelve-horse race on a treadmill (for the Gold Cup at Newmarket), a Hunt Breakfast embellished by fifteen dogs, an auto-smash-up, the Chamber of Horrors at Madame Tussaud's Waxworks, and a train wreck with a locomotive hissing real steam. It boasted a dissolute earl and a wicked marquis, and a heroine whose hand was sought by both knave and hero. It was a tremendous emotional dose for anyone as stage-struck and impressionable as our heroine.

The heroine, "Lady Di" Sartoris, created by Jessie Bateman, was referenced in P. G. Wodehouse's Heavy Weather (1933).

== Adaptations ==
A novelization by Richard Parker was published in 1913. The play was adapted into films of the same name in 1917 and again in 1928.

== Sources ==
- Poppiti, Kimberly, ed. (25 July 2022). "The Whip, by Cecil Raleigh and Henry Hamilton (1909)". Equestrian Drama: An Anthology of Plays (1st ed.). Routledge. doi:10.4324/9780429274152-5. ISBN 9780429274152.
- "The Whip". The Play Pictorial. 14. Greening: 276–301. 1909.
