= The Sporting Duchess (1915 film) =

1915 film

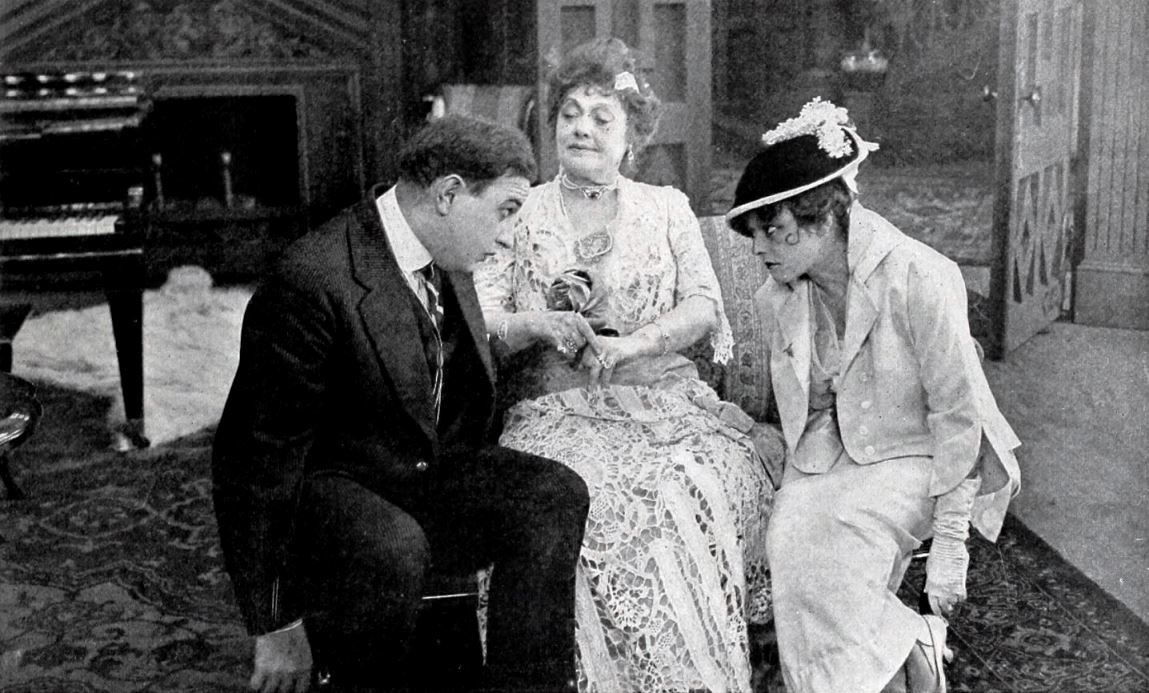
- Still with Rose Coghlan at center, pointing to her ring finger
- Directed by: Barry O'Neil
- Written by: Clay M. Greene
- Based on: The Sporting Duchess by Cecil Raleigh, Henry Hamilton, and Augustus Thomas
- Produced by: Siegmund Lubin (a Lubin Liberty Bell Feature)
- Starring: Rose Coghlan; Ethel Clayton
- Production company: Lubin Manufacturing Company
- Distributed by: V-L-S-E
- Release date: June 7, 1915
- Running time: 6 reels
- Country: United States
- Language: Silent (English intertitles)

The Sporting Duchess is a 1915 American silent drama film directed by Barry O'Neil and starring Rose Coghlan and Ethel Clayton. It was produced by the Lubin Manufacturing Company and distributed by V-L-S-E.

The film was remade by Vitagraph Studios in 1920 with Alice Joyce in the title role.

== Cast ==
- Rose Coghlan as The Sporting Duchess
- Ethel Clayton as Lady Muriel Desborough
- Rosetta Brice as Vivian Darville
- Frankie Mann as Annette Donnelly
- Florence Williams as Mrs. Donnelly
- Charles Brandt as Colonel Donnelly
- Ruth Bryan as Mary Aylmer
- George Soule Spencer as Lord Desborough
- James Daly as Mr. Aylmer
- George Tidmarsh as Captain Mostyn
- Joseph Kaufman as Rupert Lee
- Clarence Elmer as Dick Hammond
- Alan Quinn as Dr. Streatield
- Brooks McCloskey as Harold Desborough

== Preservation ==
With no prints of The Sporting Duchess located in any film archives, it is a lost film.
