= Diana Souhami =

English writer

- Born: 25 August 1940 (age 86); Edmonton, London, England
- Education: University of Hull

Diana Souhami (born 25 August 1940) is an English writer of biographies, short stories and plays. She is noted for her unconventional biographies of prominent lesbians.

== Early life and education ==
Souhami was born amidst the London Blitz at the Crown & Anchor pub in Edmonton. She and her mother Freda subsequently took refuge in Tilehurst with her grandmother and then Cardiff, where her father was working. Back in London, Souhami grew up in West Hampstead and attended Emmanuel Church of England Primary School. She is of Sephardic Jewish descent via Spain and Turkey.

Souhami studied philosophy at University of Hull.

== Career ==
Before turning to writing biography, Souhami worked in the publications department of the BBC. While there, she published short stories, wrote plays that were performed at Edinburgh Festival, The Kings Head in Islington, and broadcast as radio and television plays by the BBC. She devised an exhibition for the British Council called A Woman's Place: The Changing Picture of Women in Britain, which in 1984 toured 30 countries. Her book based on this exhibition was published by Penguin Books. She also reviewed books and plays for newspapers. In 1986 she was approached by Pandora Press and received a commission to write a biography of the artist Gluck.

Her life of Gluck was her only book in which she used a birth-to-death approach until her life of Edith Cavell (2010). "We don't live our lives or read in a linear fashion. Also, the internet has so much information that it rather absolves the biographer from being a storehouse of knowledge."

Souhami became a full-time writer, publishing biographies which mostly explore the most influential and intriguing of 20th century lesbian (and gay) lives. She followed Gluck (1988), with Gertrude and Alice (1991), an account of the relationship between Gertrude Stein and Alice B. Toklas which lasted from their first meeting to Stein's death in 1946, Greta and Cecil (1994) examining the romantic relationship between Greta Garbo and Cecil Beaton, and Mrs Keppel and her daughter (1996), a dual biography of Alice Keppel, a long-time mistress of King Edward VII, and her daughter, Violet Trefusis. The Trials of Radclyffe Hall (1998), the biography of Marguerite Radclyffe Hall, won the Lambda Literary Award for Biography in 2000 and was shortlisted for the James Tait Black Memorial Prize.

In 2001, she departed from her usual genre to publish Selkirk's Island, an account of Alexander Selkirk's years as a castaway on Isla Más a Tierra (now better known as Robinson Crusoe Island) in the Juan Fernández archipelago. Booksellers and librarians had been puzzling whether to classify the book as fact, fiction, faction, fable or fantasy when it won the 2001 Whitbread Biography Award.

Returning to lesbian biography, Wild Girls (2004) is another dual biography, this time of the American couple Romaine Brooks and Natalie Barney, part of the artistic expat community in Paris between the wars. Never a conventional biographer, Souhami places at the start of each chapter a short passage in italics where "she appears to be narrating some of her personal lesbian experiences - waiting in a bar for a blind date, a secret affair with a woman Dean, furtive love-making with a girl on the deck of a Greek ferry at night."

In 2007 Souhami returned to writing about islands with Coconut Chaos, set on and en route to Pitcairn Island. Two stories are intertwined: an investigation into the lives of the HMS Bounty mutineers and their descendants, and a memoir of her journey to the mid-Pacific rock on a freighter with a woman known only as "Lady Myre". She visited at the time of the 2004 Pitcairn Islands sexual assault trial, and although she attempted to travel incognito, the Pitcairn Islanders discovered that she was a writer and asked her to leave. This book was dramatised for BBC radio.

Souhami won the 2021 Polari Prize for No Modernism Without Lesbians.

In July 2024 Souhami was elected a Fellow of the Royal Society of Literature.

== Works ==
=== Books ===
- A woman's place : the changing picture of women in Britain. Harmondsworth: Penguin Books. 1986. ISBN 978-0-14-008609-6.
- Gluck, 1895-1978 : her biography. Hammersmith: Pandora. 1988. ISBN 978-0863582363.
- Gertrude and Alice. Hammersmith: Pandora. 1991. ISBN 978-0-04-440833-8.
- Bakst : the Rothschild panels of the Sleeping beauty. London: Philip Wilson. 1992. ISBN 978-0-85667-419-8.
- Greta and Cecil. London: Jonathan Cape. 1994. ISBN 978-0-297-64364-7.
- Mrs Keppel and Her Daughter. London: Harper Collins. 1996. ISBN 978-0-00-255645-3.
- The Trials of Radclyffe Hall. London: Weidenfeld & Nicolson. 1998. ISBN 978-0-297-81825-0.
- Selkirk's Island. London: Weidenfeld and Nicolson. 2001. ISBN 978-0-297-64385-2.
- Wild girls : Natalie Barney and Romaine Brooks. London: Weidenfeld & Nicolson. 2004. ISBN 978-0-297-64386-9.
- Coconut Chaos. London: Weidenfeld & Nicolson. 2007. ISBN 978-0-297-84787-8.
- Edith Cavell. London: Quercus. 2010. ISBN 978-1-84916-361-3.
- Murder at Wrotham Hill. London: Quercus. 2012. ISBN 978-0-85738-283-2.
- Gwendolen. London: Quercus. 2014. ISBN 978-1-78206-352-0.
- No Modernism without Lesbians. London: Head of Zeus. 2020. ISBN 978-1-78669-487-4.

=== Television writing ===
- The Weekend (1976) dir John Bruce production BBC
- Jupiter Moon (1990)
