= Outlaws of Red River =

1927 film

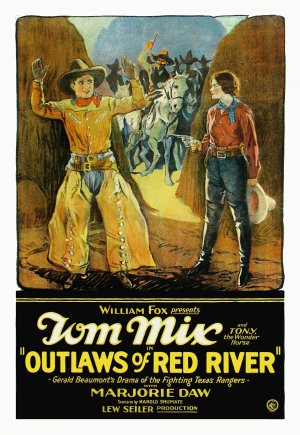
- Theatrical release poster
- Directed by: Lewis Seiler
- Screenplay by: Harold Shumate; Malcolm Stuart Boylan
- Story by: Gerald Beaumont
- Starring: Tom Mix; Marjorie Daw; Arthur Clayton; William Conklin; Duke R. Lee; Francis McDonald
- Cinematography: Daniel B. Clark
- Production company: Fox Film Corporation
- Distributed by: Fox Film Corporation
- Release date: May 8, 1927
- Running time: 60 minutes
- Country: United States
- Languages: Silent; English intertitles

Outlaws of Red River is a 1927 American silent Western film directed by Lewis Seiler and written by Harold Shumate and Malcolm Stuart Boylan. The film stars Tom Mix, Marjorie Daw, Arthur Clayton, William Conklin, Duke R. Lee, and Francis McDonald. The film was released on May 8, 1927, by Fox Film Corporation.

== Cast ==
- Tom Mix as Tom Morley
- Tony the Wonder Horse as Tony, Tom's Horse
- Marjorie Daw as Mary Torrence
- Arthur Clayton as Sam Hardwick
- William Conklin as Captain Dunning
- Duke R. Lee as Dick Williams
- Francis McDonald as Ben Tanner
- Lee Shumway as Mr. Torrence
- Ellen Woonston as Mrs. Torrence
- Jimmy Downs as Tom Morley
- Virginia Marshall as Mary as a child
