= The Whip (1917 film) =

1917 film by Maurice Tourneur

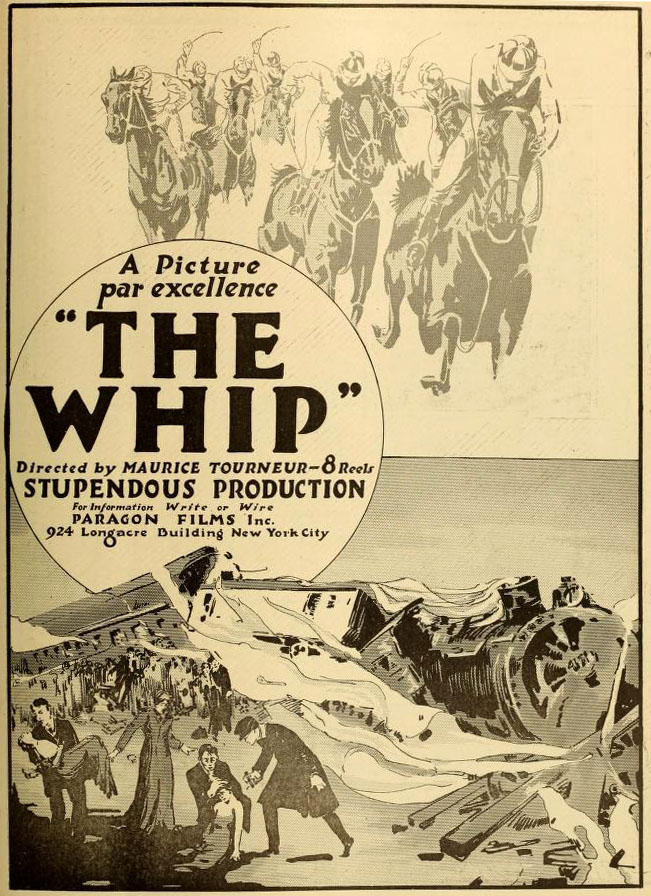
- Advertisement for the film
- Directed by: Maurice Tourneur
- Based on: The Whip by: Henry Hamilton; Cecil Raleigh
- Release date: March 25, 1917
- Running time: 80 minutes
- Country: United States
- Language: Silent (English intertitles)

The Whip is a 1917 American silent drama film directed by Maurice Tourneur that is based on the play of the same name by Henry Hamilton and Cecil Raleigh. The film stars Alma Hanlon, June Elvidge, and Irving Cummings. It also features Bobby Vernon, Wallace Beery, as well as Gloria Swanson in one of her early film roles. The film survives and has been released on DVD.

== Plot ==
The Whip (1917)

The movie tells the story of the training of a racehorse, the Whip, of the amnesiac nobleman who loves the horse, and of the villains who attempt to keep it from racing.

== Cast ==
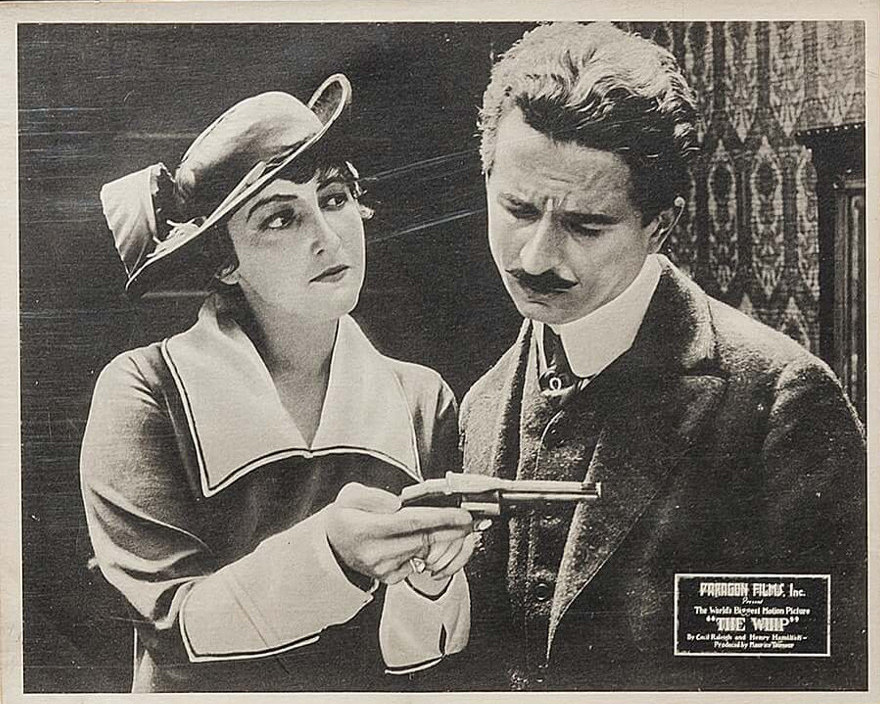
Lobby card for the film

- Alma Hanlon as Diana Beverley
- June Elvidge as Mrs. D'Aquilia
- Irving Cummings as Herbert Brancaster
- Warren Cook as Judge Beverley
- Paul McAllister as Baron Sartoris
- Alfred Hemming as Joe Kelly
- Dion Titheradge as Harry Anson
- Jean Dumas as Myrtle Anson

== Reception ==
Like many American films of the time, The Whip was subject to cuts by city and state film censorship boards. The Chicago Board of Censors required the flashing of three gambling scenes and cuts of the scene of a man disconnecting a brake and the intertitle "Our affair started on the boat. I was weak and yielded."

== External sources ==
- The Whip at IMDb
- The Whip at www.nuraypictures.com
