= The Whip (1928 film) =

1928 film

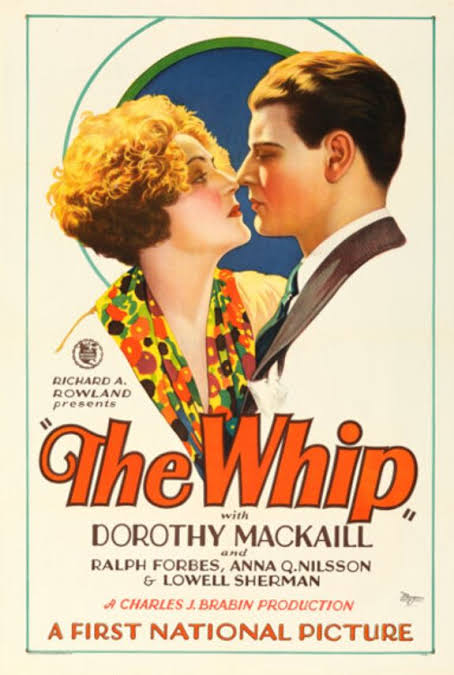
- theatrical release poster
- Directed by: Charles Brabin
- Written by: Bernard McConville; J. L. Campbell; Dwinelle Benthall (titles); Rufus McCosh (titles)
- Based on: The Whip by Cecil Raleigh and Henry Hamilton
- Produced by: Richard Rowland
- Starring: Dorothy Mackaill; Anna Q. Nilsson
- Cinematography: James Van Trees
- Edited by: George McGuire
- Distributed by: First National Pictures
- Release date: September 16, 1928
- Running time: 70 minutes
- Country: United States
- Language: Sound (Synchronized) (English intertitles)

The Whip is a 1928 American synchronized sound drama film directed by Charles Brabin and starring Dorothy Mackaill. While the film has no audible dialog, it was released with a synchronized musical score with sound effects using the sound-on-disc Vitaphone process. It was based on a 1912 play The Whip by Cecil Raleigh and Henry Hamilton and distributed by First National. This sound film was released with a synchronized Vitaphone soundtrack of music and sound effects. It is set in the horse racing world of England.

== Plot ==
Lord Brancaster, a well-bred young aristocrat, is elated about his engagement to the glamorous and ambitious Madame Iris d'Aquila. Unknown to him, Iris is marrying Brancaster not for love but for his title and wealth. The night before their wedding, the couple dines at the exclusive Ambassador Club, where Brancaster overhears a revealing conversation between Iris and her secret lover, the scheming Greville Sartoris. From their exchange, he learns of their affair and her true motives.

Devastated, Brancaster leaves London for his country estate, but along the way he suffers an automobile accident that leaves him with amnesia. Though physically uninjured, he loses all memory of his past. He is taken in by Lord Beverly at his estate, Falconhurst, where he meets and soon falls in love with Lord Beverly’s daughter, Lady Diana.

Learning of Brancaster’s memory loss, Sartoris and Iris travel to Falconhurst and devise a sinister plan. They forge a marriage certificate and present Iris as Brancaster’s legal wife. The deception plays out amid the whirl of country life at Falconhurst, where the prized racehorse “The Whip” is being trained and trialed. Despite early concerns over the horse's unpredictable behavior, anticipation builds toward a major upcoming race.

A fox hunt and the subsequent Hunt Ball are held at Falconhurst. During the ball, Lord Brancaster and Lady Diana announce their engagement. However, Madame d'Aquila arrives uninvited and, claiming to be Lady Brancaster, produces the forged marriage certificate, branding Brancaster a fraud. The scandal stuns the guests, and Brancaster, still uncertain of his past, cannot refute her claim.

Later, Brancaster and Diana meet again at the Garden Club Flower Show in London. Diana tells him she knows he has been duped and expresses her belief that “The Whip” cannot lose the upcoming race—despite its prior poor performances. Sartoris, unaware of the horse's sudden improvement, has already bet heavily against it. He also tips off bookmaker Sam Kelley, to whom he owes over £2,000. Kelley, trusting the information, places all his money alongside Sartoris’s bet.

The evening before the race, “The Whip” is transported to town by train. Brancaster and Lady Diana ride on the same train. Determined to sabotage the race, Sartoris sneaks aboard and uncouples the car containing the horse, leaving it stranded on the tracks ahead of an express train. Brancaster catches him in the act and the two men struggle. As the express nears, Brancaster climbs atop the stranded car and manages to pull it to a siding just in time to avert disaster.

At the race track the next day, Sartoris, thinking the sabotage was successful, places enormous bets against “The Whip.” When the horse’s name appears on the board, he realizes his plan has failed. Kelley, furious at being misled, confronts Sartoris publicly. In the heat of the moment, Kelley exposes the entire scheme, including the forged marriage certificate and Sartoris’s role in the fraud.

Brancaster’s name is cleared, and “The Whip” goes on to win the race, restoring his fortune and securing his future. With the scandal behind them, Brancaster and Lady Diana are free to marry.

== Cast ==
- Dorothy Mackaill as Lady Diana
- Ralph Forbes as Lord Brancaster
- Anna Q. Nilsson as Iris d'Aquila
- Lowell Sherman as Greville Sartoris
- Albert Gran as Sam Kelley
- Marc McDermott as Lord Beverly
- Louis Payne as Lambert
- Arthur Clayton as Richard Haslam
- Jack McDonald as Detective (uncredited)

== Music ==
The film featured a theme song that was entitled "Just Because It's You" which was written by W. Franke Harling and Lou Klein.

== Preservation ==
The Whip survives in archives at Cineteca Italiana, Milan, and the UCLA Film & Television Archive.

== See also ==
- List of films about horses
- List of films about horse racing
