= In Folly's Trail =

1920 film directed by Rollin S. Sturgeon

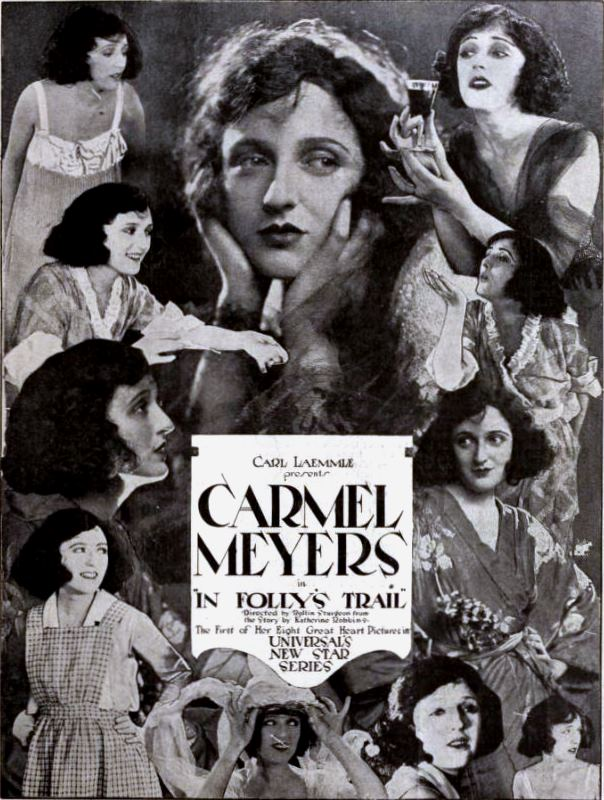
- Theatrical release poster
- Directed by: Rollin S. Sturgeon
- Screenplay by: Doris Schroeder
- Based on: In Folly's Trail by Katherine Leiser Robbins
- Starring: Carmel Myers; Thomas Holding; Arthur Clayton; George B. Williams; Viola Lind; W.H. Bainbridge
- Cinematography: Harry B. Harris
- Production company: Universal Film Manufacturing Company
- Distributed by: Universal Film Manufacturing Company
- Release date: September 6, 1920
- Running time: 50 minutes
- Country: United States
- Language: Silent (English intertitles)

In Folly's Trail is a 1920 American silent drama film directed by Rollin S. Sturgeon and written by Doris Schroeder. The film stars Carmel Myers, Thomas Holding, Arthur Clayton, George B. Williams, Viola Lind, and W.H. Bainbridge. The film was released on September 6, 1920, by Universal Film Manufacturing Company.

== Cast ==
- Carmel Myers as Lita O'Farrell
- Thomas Holding as Charles Howard
- Arthur Clayton as Ronnie
- George B. Williams as Max Goldberg
- Viola Lind as Mavis
- W.H. Bainbridge as Col. Houston
- Beth Ivins as Pattie Houston
