= Arthur Clayton (actor) =

British actor (1902–1955)

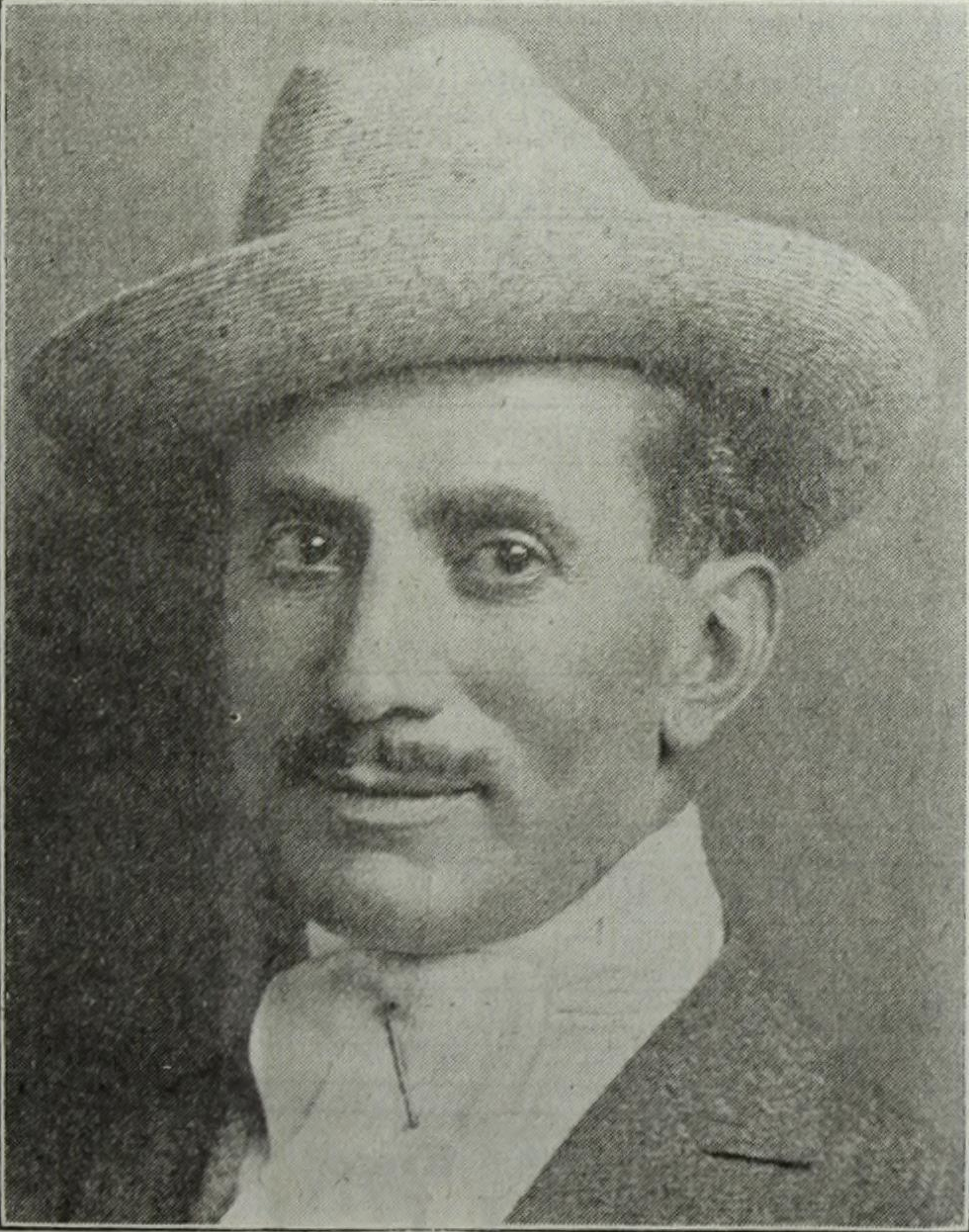
- Born: 29 January 1902; London, United Kingdom
- Died: 19 February 1955 (aged 53); New Brighton, United Kingdom
- Occupation: Actor
- Years active: 1920-1936 (film)

Arthur Clayton (1902–1955) was a British film actor who primarily worked in American films during the silent and early sound era.

== Selected filmography ==
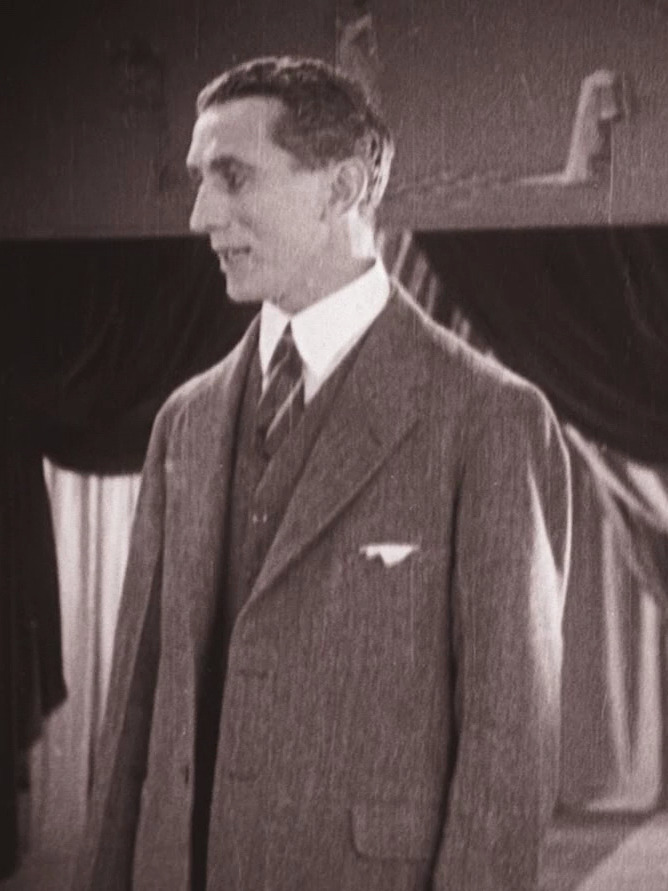
Arthur Clayton in Be My Wife

- The Hope (1920)
- In Folly's Trail (1920)
- The Hope Diamond Mystery (1921)
- The Mistress of Shenstone (1921)
- Be My Wife (1921)
- Laddie (1926)
- The Better 'Ole (1926)
- Outlaws of Red River (1927)
- Confessions of a Wife (1928)
- The Whip (1928)
- The Black Watch (1929)
- Three Live Ghosts (1929)
- Girl of the Port (1930)
- Ingagi (1930)
- The Road to Singapore (1931)
- Stingaree (1934)
- White Heat (1934)
- Green Eyes (1934)
- Menace (1934)
- Charlie Chan in London (1934)
- Crimson Romance (1934)
- Marie Galante (1934)
- The Deputy Drummer (1935)
- Everything Is Rhythm (1936)

== Bibliography ==
- Munden, Kenneth White. The American Film Institute Catalog of Motion Pictures Produced in the United States, Part 1. University of California Press, 1997.
