= Be My Wife (1921 film) =

1921 film

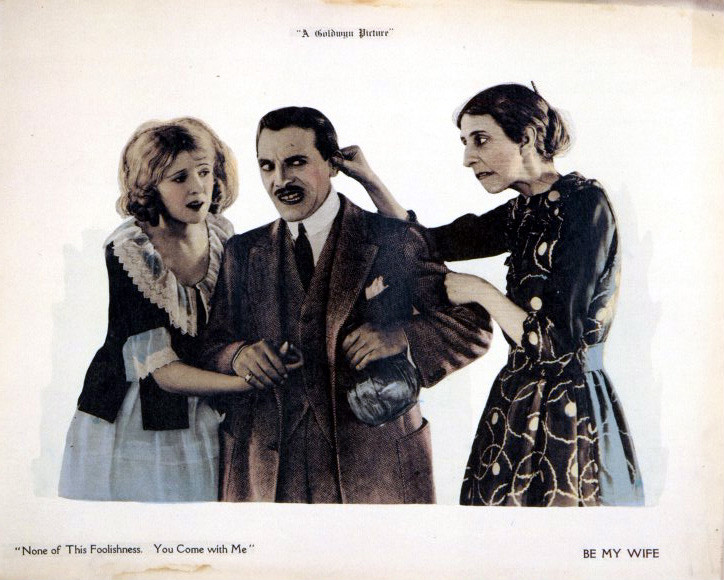
- Lobby card
- Directed by: Max Linder
- Written by: Max Linder
- Produced by: Max Linder
- Starring: Max Linder
- Cinematography: Charles Van Enger
- Distributed by: Goldwyn Pictures
- Release date: April 2, 1921
- Running time: 57 minutes
- Country: United States
- Language: Silent (English intertitles)

Be My Wife is a 1921 American silent comedy film written, directed, and starring Max Linder.

== Plot ==
Be My Wife (1921)

As described in a film magazine, Max (Linder) is seeking the hand of Mary (Allen), but he has a rival and her Aunt Agatha (Rankin) objects to him. He disguises himself as a music teacher, but a dog "Pal" discovers him. Max falls over a fence and becomes unconscious. He dreams that he is married but cannot shake the aunt. There is a wife who suspects her husband of flirting and retaliates by picking a few lovers herself. Just as the marital difficulties are settled, Max wakes up. He then attempts to win over his sweetheart by impersonating a burglar in a terrific struggle with himself in an adjoining room while Mary, his rival, and Aunt Agatha listen to the fight. He steps forth "victorious and wins her hand, and the crabby aunt accepts him as her nephew-in-law.

== Cast ==
- Max Linder as Max, the Fiancé
- Alta Allen as Mary, the Girl
- Caroline Rankin as Aunt Agatha
- Lincoln Stedman as Archie
- Rose Dione as Madame Coralie
- Charles McHugh as Mr. Madame Coralie
- Viora Daniel as Mrs. Du Pont
- Arthur Clayton as Mr. Du Pont
