= The Hope (film) =

1920 film

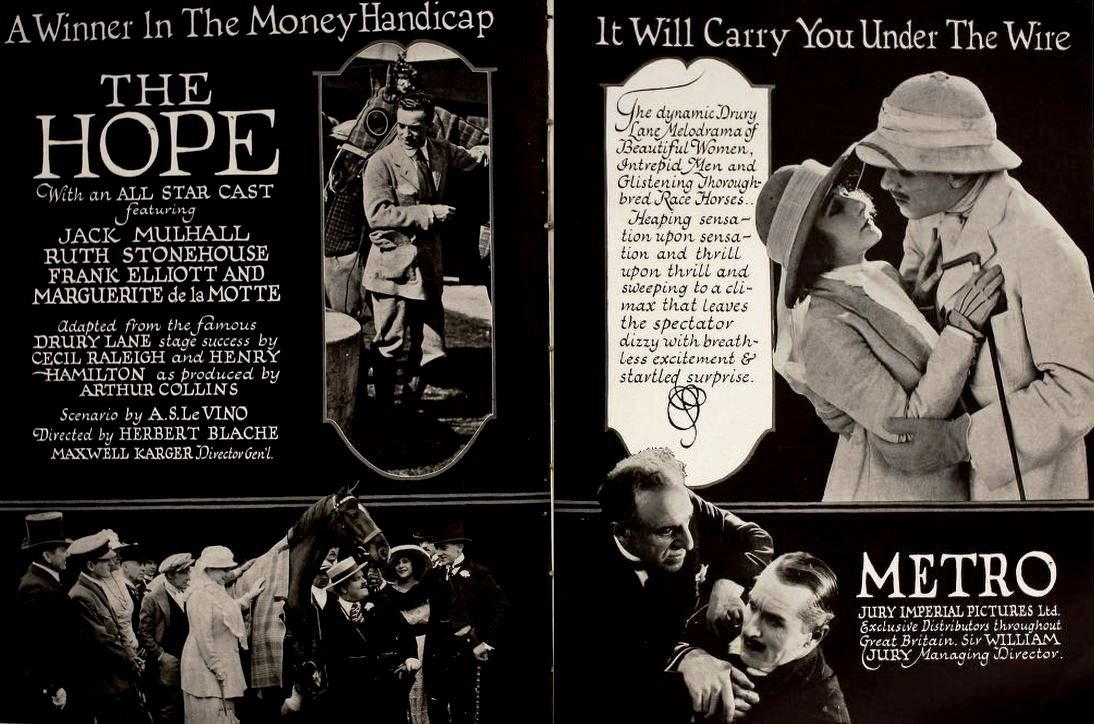
- Directed by: Herbert Blaché
- Written by: Albert S. Le Vino (scenario)
- Based on: The Hope by Henry Hamilton and Cecil Raleigh
- Produced by: Maxwell Karger
- Starring: Jack Mulhall; Marguerite De La Motte
- Distributed by: Metro Pictures
- Release date: September 7, 1920
- Running time: 6 reels
- Country: United States
- Language: Silent (English intertitles)

The Hope is a 1920 American silent drama film directed by Herbert Blaché and starring Jack Mulhall, Marguerite De La Motte, and Ruth Stonehouse. It was produced and distributed by the Metro Pictures company.

== Plot ==
As described in a film magazine, blackguard usurer Michael Waltburn (Grimwood), assuming for business purposes the name of Milton Dudley, keeps his daughter Olive (Stonehouse) in ignorance of his profession. He arranges with the Duchess of Remington (Kelso) to sponsor Olive socially, and in return he will not enforce payment of a debt owed to him. At the home of Harold, Lord Ingestre (Mulhall), fiancé of Lady Brenda Carylon (De La Motte), Olive meets social rake Hector Grant (Elliott). Hector knows Olive's identity and threatens her father with disclosure unless he is reimbursed with loans. The quartet meet again in India where the two men are in the King's Rifles. Hector deceives Olive into a secret marriage and then refuses to acknowledge her as his wife and drives her from him with revealing her father's secret. Hector then resumes his siege for the heart of Lady Brenda, who previously had spurned his affections, and leads her to believe that Harold is the husband of Olive. Searching for her to discover the real truth, Harold finds Olive in Italy. An earthquake associated with a volcanic eruption in Italy kills Hector while on the way to make reparation, and Lady Brenda learns the real situation.

== Cast ==
- Jack Mulhall as Harold, Lord Ingestre
- Marguerite De La Motte as Lady Brenda Carylon
- Ruth Stonehouse as Olive Waltburn
- Frank Elliott as Hector Grant
- Lillian Langdon as Countess Ingestre
- Mayme Kelso as Duchess of Remington
- Arthur Clayton as Captain Jamison
- J.P. Morse as Orderly
- Bobbie Mack as Lyddon (credited as Bobby Mack)
- Herbert Grimwood as Michael

== Preservation status ==
A print is preserved from the MGM by the George Eastman Museum.
