= William Fullerton Jr. =

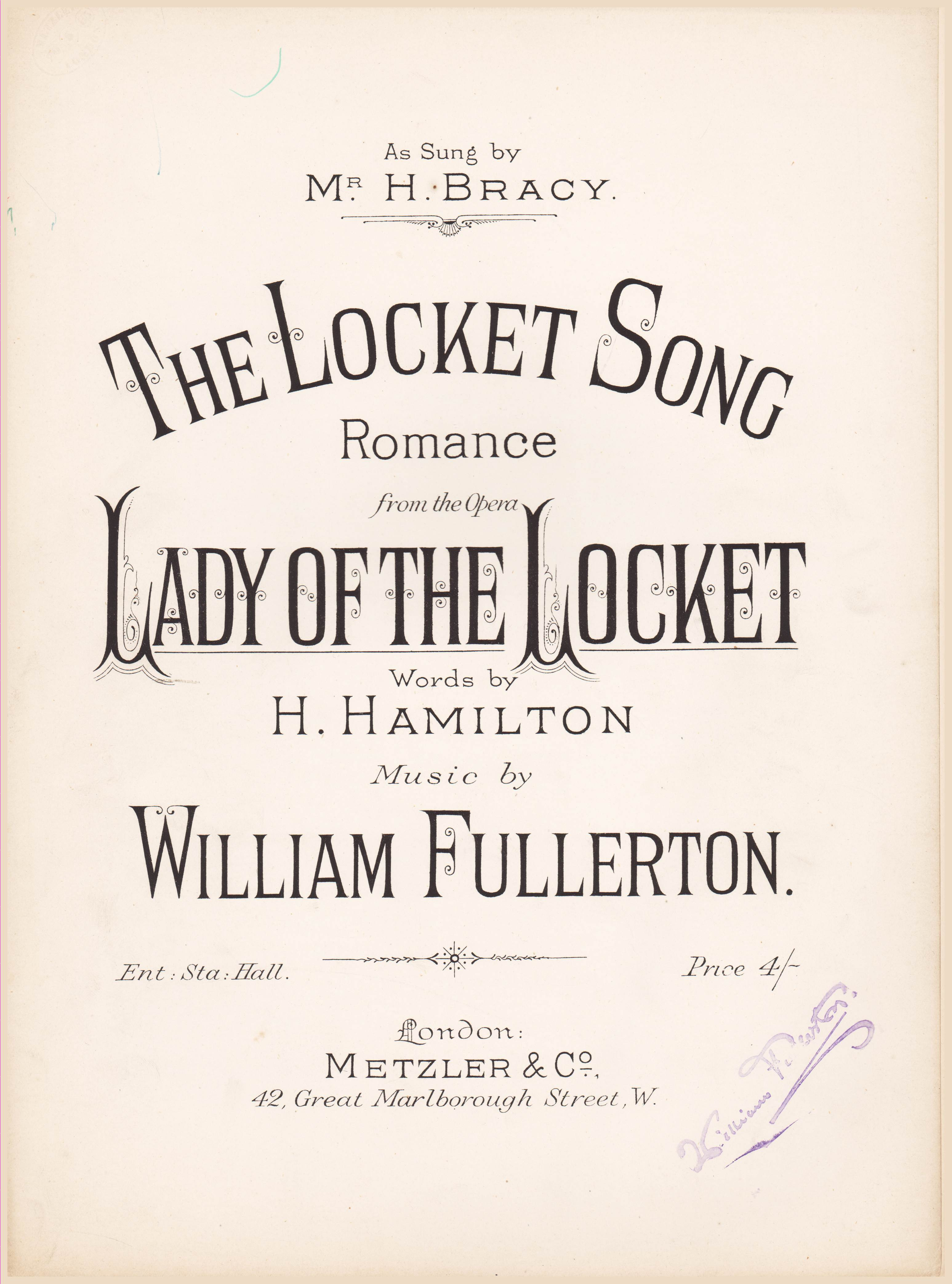
Sheet music cover: "The Locket Song"

William Fullerton Jr. (1854 – August 25, 1888) was an American-born composer who was active in London's musical and theatrical world until he died of tuberculosis at the age of 34. He composed songs and comic opera scores, and was associated with Percy Anderson and other theatrical figures in London.

== Life and career ==
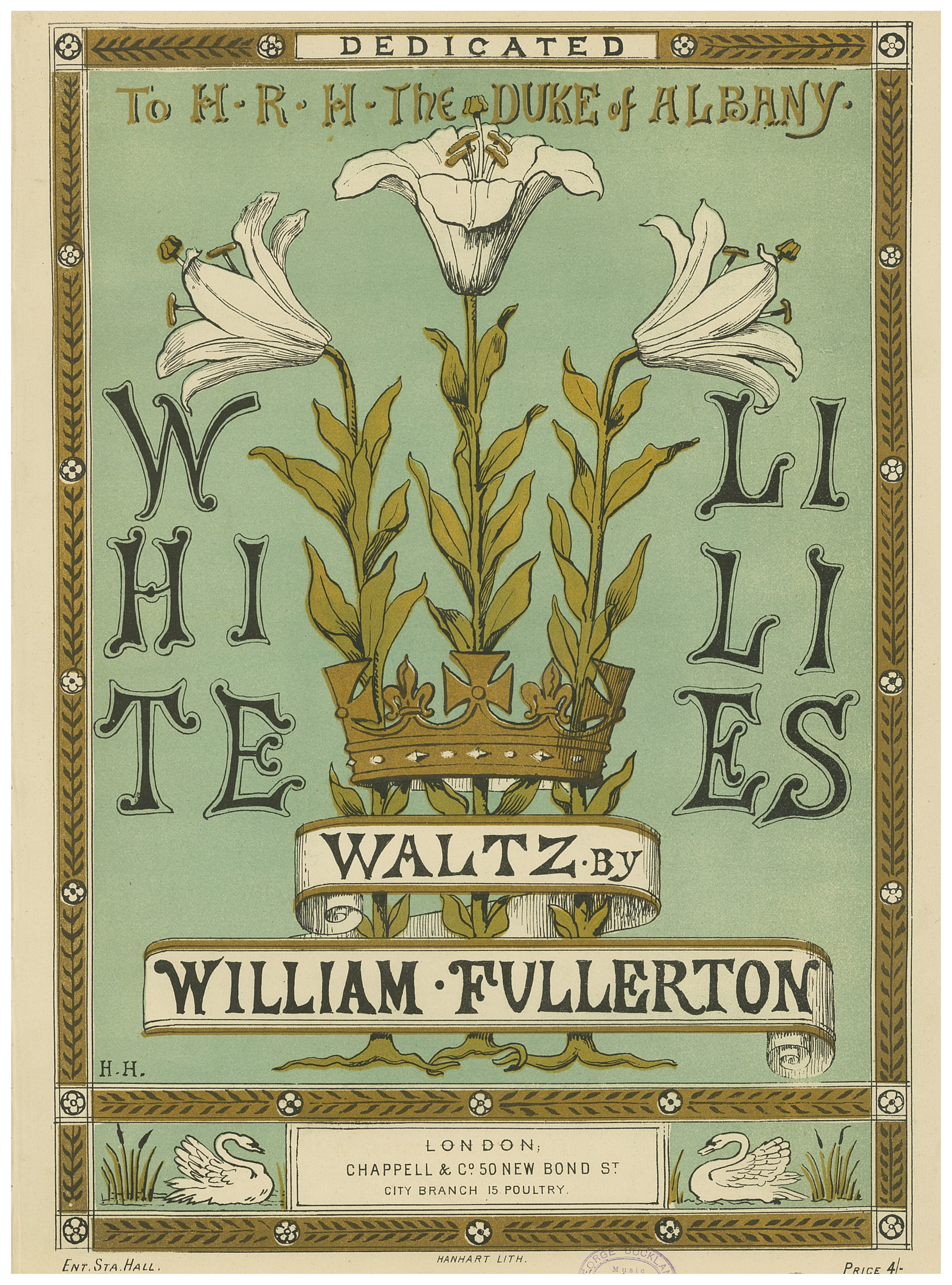
Sheet music cover: "White Lilies Waltz"

Fullerton was born in the city of Newburgh, New York. He was the only son of a prominent American trial lawyer, William Fullerton. His earliest surviving piece, "Silver Strains" was published in 1871, when he was 17. Although not primarily a librettist, in the late 1870s, he provided romantic lyrics for two compositions by composer Rudolph Aronson, who later founded and managed New York City's Casino Theatre.

Fullerton left the United States to study music in Leipzig, and then settled in London, where he lived openly with another man, Percy Anderson, a talented painter with aristocratic connections. Anderson's sumptuous rooms became a gathering place for the musical and dramatic world. In London, he wrote and published a variety of popular compositions, several of which were dedicated to members of the Royal Family and their circle. "May-be-so!", published in New York in 1880, was dedicated to the "Duchesse of Westminster". The ailing Lady Constance (who died the same year) was the wife of Hugh Grosvenor, 1st Duke of Westminster. "In a Dream", published in 1881 (a song in the German "lieder" tradition, based on a poem by Heinrich Heine), was dedicated to Lady Agneta Montagu, a daughter of Charles Yorke, 4th Earl of Hardwicke and a bridesmaid to Alexandra of Denmark. An 1882 piece, "White Lilies Waltz," was dedicated to Prince Leopold, Duke of Albany, a favorite son of Queen Victoria who died from hemophilia in 1885. "Grand March Heroic: Tel-el-kebir", also published in 1882, celebrated a military victory over Egyptian nationalist forces, in the Battle of Tel el-Kebir, which secured British control over the Suez Canal.

Fullerton had a theatrical success with an operetta, "Lady of the Locket", with a libretto by Henry Hamilton, a costly spectacle that opened in London's Empire Theatre in March 1885. The costumes for the production were designed and produced by his friend, Percy Anderson. The production launched Anderson's career as a leading costume designer for decades to come, as well as the career of their friend, the baritone Hayden Coffin. Musical conductor Jimmy Glover later claimed, probably in jest, that Hamilton and Fullerton had insisted that certain choral parts be sung by "real guardsmen", and that he had rehearsed 16 soldiers for weeks, only to have them called away to serve in Egypt. Critics gave the light music negative reviews, but the piece was popular, and the run lasted from early March until late July, when the heat decreased theatre attendance.

Following this success, another light opera, "Waldemar: Robber of the Rhine" was ready for production, but Fullerton fell ill and died from what was described as "consumption", on August 25, 1888. A memorial in The Times mourned the loss of "our Billy", a remarkable tribute to a young American. He was closely attended in his final illness by Percy Anderson, who arranged for Fullerton's burial in Crondall Burying Ground, All Saints Church, Hampshire, United Kingdom. Anderson died 40 years later, in 1928, and was buried, at his own request, in the same cemetery.

Following his death, Fullerton's works were largely forgotten and many are now apparently lost. A Fullerton piece entitled "Spanish Serenade", with lyrics by writer Charles Hamilton Aidé, is in the Library of Congress in an 1890 edition entitled "Choice English Songs".

== Works ==
- "Silver Strains," Library of Congress, Notated Music, 187 1.06780.
- "Marguerite Waltzes," Fullerton, William, New York: W & A Pond & Co, 1873
- "On the Silent Sea," Fullerton, William, Rudolph Aronson, New York: Edward Aronson, New York, 1877
- "Bright Blue Eyes," Fullerton, William, Rudolph Aronson, New York: Edward Aronson, 1878
- "May be so," Fullerton, William; Schubert and Co., Edward, 1880, Library of Congress, Microfilm M 3500 M2.3.U6A44.
- "In a Dream," Fullerton, William; London: Chappelle & Co., 1881
- "Come Forth for Night is Falling," Fullerton, William, sung by Lionel Benson Esq., London: Chappelle & Co., 1881
- "The Nightingale Sang to the Rose," Fullerton, William, words by Alice Williams, London, Chappelle & Co., 1881
- "Midnight," Fullerton, William, words by L. Courtenay, London: Chappelle & Co., 1881
- "In a Dream," Fullerton, William, words by Louise Chandler Moulton, London: Chappelle & Co., 1881
- "Twilight," Fullerton, William, words by Cotsford Dick, London: Enoch & sons, 1882
- "Where Thou Art," Fullerton, William, words by J.L. Puxley, London: Chappelle & Co., 1882
- "The Promise of Love - A Seville Love Song," Fullerton, William, words by Hamilton Aide, London: Boosey & Co., 1883
- "Grand March Heroic, 'Tel-el-kebir'," Fullerton, William, London: Chappelle & Co., 1883.
- "White Lilies Waltz," Fullerton, William; London: Chappelle & Co., 1883.
- "Barcarolle" from "Lady of the Locket," Metzler & Co., London, 1885. (Recorded by pianist Albert Garzon in 2016, available on YouTube under "Venezia Mi Bella": https://www.youtube.com/watch?v=-oFh1prN0zE)
- "The Locket Song" from the opera "Lady of the Locket," Fullerton, William, words by H. Hamilton, Metzler & Co., London, 1885.
- "Up English Hearts (a war song)" from the opera "Lady of the Locket," Fullerton, William, words by H. Hamilton, Metzler & Co., London, 1885.
- "That Word of Words," Fullerton, William, words by Madge Hepworth Dixon, London: Enoch & sons, 1886.
- "Spanish Serenade: a Seville Love Song", W. Fullerton, included in "Choice English Songs, Clayton F. Sammy, Chicago, 1890. (Recorded by pianist Albert Garzon in 2016, available on Youtube under "Seville Love Song": https://www.youtube.com/watch?v=MwglGQ6DOqw)

== Sources ==
- Coffin, Hayden (1930). Hayden Coffin's Book, Packed with Acts and Facts. London: Alston Rivers Ltd., London.
