= Amelia Bingham =

American actress

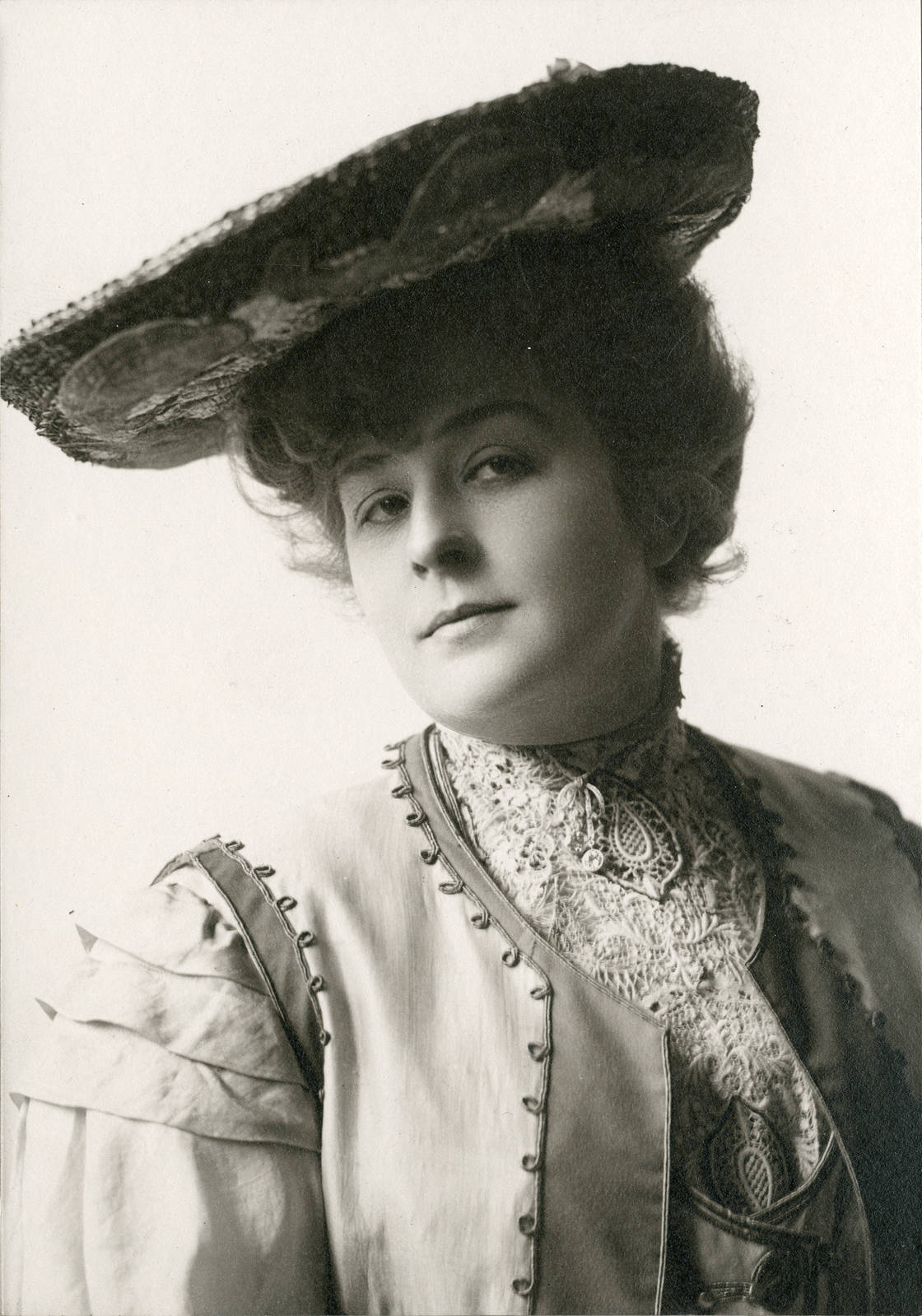
- Bingham c. 1903
- Born: Amelia Swilley Bingham; March 20, 1869; Hicksville, Ohio U.S.
- Died: September 1, 1927 (aged 58); New York City, U.S.
- Resting place: Woodlawn Cemetery, Bronx
- Education: Ohio Wesleyan University
- Occupation: Actress
- Spouse: Lloyd Bingham (m. 1894; died 1915)

Amelia Swilley Bingham (March 20, 1869 – September 1, 1927) was an American actress from Hicksville, Ohio. Her Broadway career extended from 1896 until 1926.

== Theatrical career ==
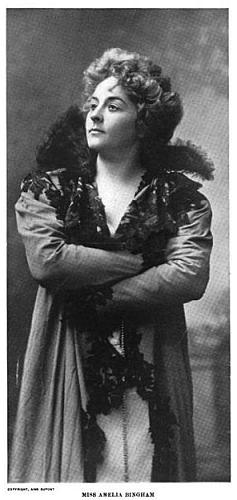
Amelia Bingham ca. 1902

Her first role in a stage production came on the Pacific Coast. Her New York City debut came at the People's Theatre, 199 Bowery, Manhattan, in 1893. Her role was a leading part in a melodrama, The Struggle For Life.

Her early successes in the 1890s included The Power of Gold, The Shaughran, Colleen Bawn, The Village Postmaster, and Captain Impudence. By 1897 she was managed by Charles Frohman and was the leading lady in The White Heather. With Frohman she was featured in The Pink Domino, The Proper Caper, On and Off, At the White Horse Tavern, The Cuckoo, and His Excellency The Governor.

Bingham's popularity as a performer peaked around 1897. She tallied more than 9,000 of 30,000 votes cast in a newspaper competition for the title of American State Queen. Earlier stars like Lillian Russell, Maud Allan, Ada Rehan, and Fannie Davenport received a mere hundred votes each.

She started the Amelia Bingham Company which produced The Climbers starring Bijou Fernandez. A visit to London, England in 1900 acquainted her with actresses who were their own producers. The Climbers by Clyde Fitch premiered at the Bijou Theatre on January 15, 1901, and had an extended run. Other plays that were staged with her oversight were Lady Margaret, The Modern Magdalen, and The Frisky Mrs. Johnson. Bingham performed and produced Olympe (1904), a Broadway play in which she later toured with Gilbert Miller.

During the summer of 1904 Olympe played for one week at the Elitch Theatre in Denver, Colorado. "While Olympe is a romantic drama, it is also known as a costume play.... Miss Bingham brought to Elitch the original costumes used in the New York production.... One gown alone cost Miss Bingham $1,000."

Bingham acted the lead in Big Moments from Great Plays (1909) and starred with William H. Crane and Douglas Fairbanks Sr. in The New Henrietta, prior to World War I. However, illness began to hinder her from working around 1914. In 1918 she appeared in The Man Who Stayed Home.

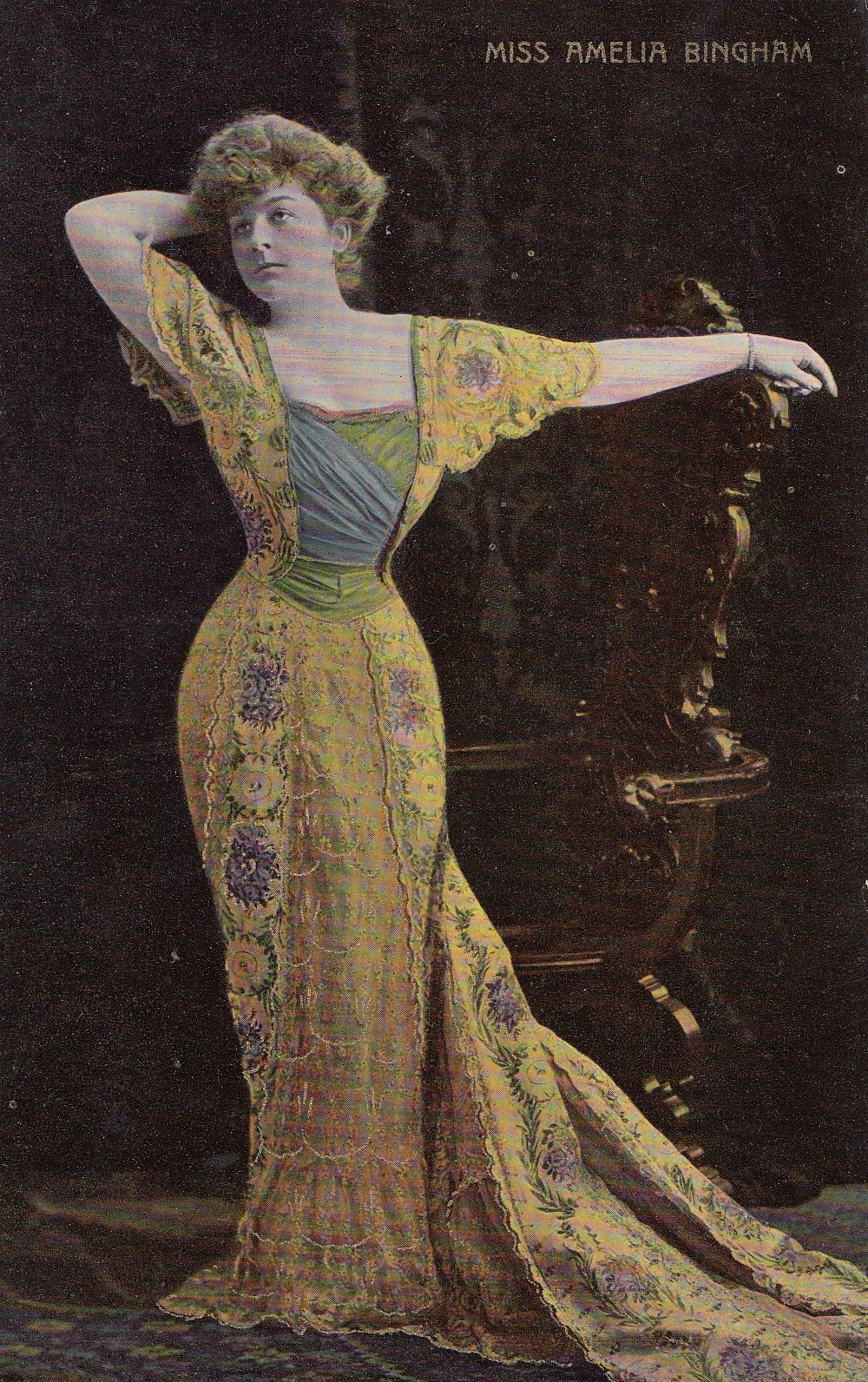
Vintage postcard of actress Amelia Bingham.

Her final stage appearance came at the Century Theatre in The Pearl of Great Price. She depicted Shame in the 1926 production. Bingham detested having to play the type of woman she portrayed in this production. She commented, for years I have played decent women on the stage. Financial circumstances forced her into accepting the part.he previous year she participated in a revival of Trelawny of the Wells (1925), written by Arthur Wing Pinero.

== Personal life and death ==
Bingham died on September 1, 1927, in New York City. She was buried at Woodlawn Cemetery, Bronx after her funeral at the Little Church Around the Corner.
