= Carleton, New Brunswick =

Former community in New Brunswick, Canada

Coordinates: 45°16′N 66°3′W

Former location of Carleton in New Brunswick

Carleton is a former community in New Brunswick.

It was located in Saint John West. It was probably named for Sir Guy Carleton, 1st Baron of Dorchester (1724–1808) and Commander in Chief of the British forces in North America. Other sources say General Carleton, first Lieutenant-Governor of New Brunswick.

The Loyalist-dominated communities of Parr Town and Carleton developed around Fort Howe.

Members of the Black Watch settled here in 1783.

In 1785, both towns were amalgamated by royal charter to become the City of Saint John, New Brunswick, making it the first incorporated city in British North America (present-day Canada).

In 1871, the suburb of Carleton had a population of 5000 people.

== Notable people ==
- May Agnes Fleming, writer (1840–1880)
