= William Fullerton (lawyer) =

American lawyer and judge

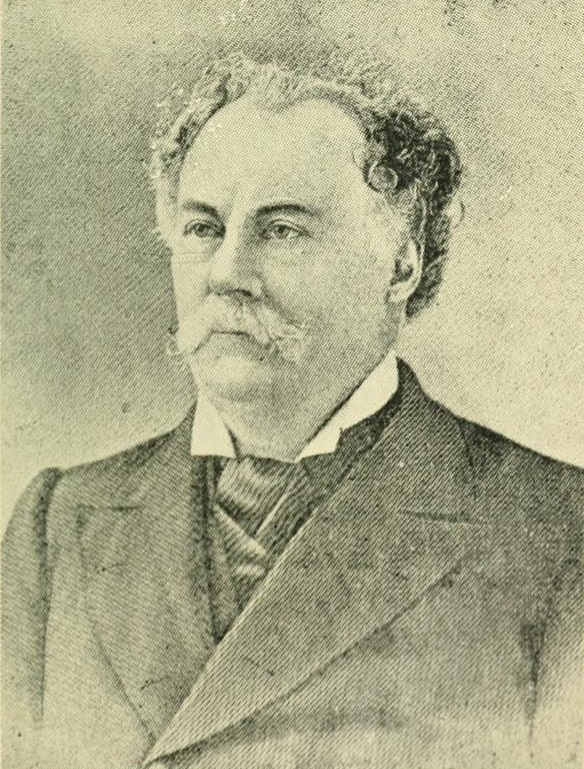
William Fullerton, New York lawyer

William S. Fullerton (May 1, 1817 – March 8, 1900), was a New York lawyer of the 1860s to 1880s. Fullerton represented industrialists and political litigants, and was also well known for his representation of women in contested divorce cases. He briefly served on the New York State Supreme Court.

== Life and career ==
Fullerton was one of twelve children born to a farming family in Minisink, New York. He worked as a school teacher and principal while attending Union College. A member of the class of 1837, he left college before graduating to study law with William C. Hasbrouck, and was admitted to the bar in 1840. He practiced in Newburgh, New York, and served as District Attorney of Orange County in the mid 1840s. After appearing in the same court case as Charles O'Conor, a prominent New York lawyer, O'Conor invited Fullerton to join his partnership in New York City. When O'Conor served as United States Attorney for the Southern District of New York in 1853 and 1854, he employed Fullerton as an Assistant U.S. Attorney to prosecute criminal trials.

In August 1867, Fullerton was appointed to fill a vacancy on the New York Supreme Court, and he served until his successor was elected in November. The growth of railroads and corporations in the 19th century, and their excesses brought an explosion of litigation and other opportunities for attorneys. The Erie War of 1868–69, for example, pitted Cornelius Vanderbilt and his legal team (including Fullerton) against Jay Gould and associates, with legal actions that kept both sides busy nearly around the clock.

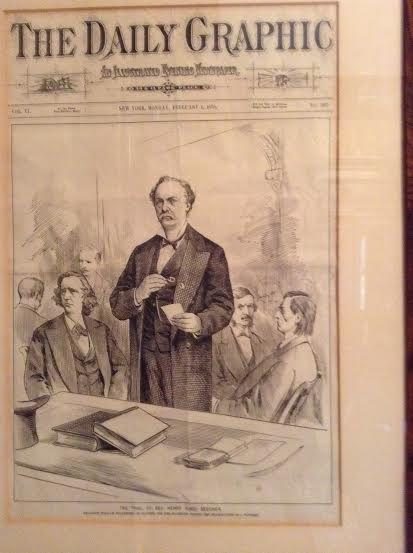
Fullerton during the Henry Ward Beecher adultery trial

Prominent cases in the 1870s made Fullerton a minor national celebrity. First, as a member of the defense team in the 1873 trials of "Boss" Tweed, his involvement in an effort to persuade Judge Noah Davis to recuse himself on grounds of prejudice led to Fullerton and others being censured and fined, despite Fullerton's presentation at a hearing that The New York Times would call "[one] of the most impressive proceedings ever witnessed in this city." Francis H. Wellman called Fullerton the "Great American Cross-Examiner" partly because of his four days of cross-examining the orator and religious figure Henry Ward Beecher, in connection with Beecher's 1875 adultery trial. The verbal jousting between Fullerton and Beecher was covered from coast to coast.

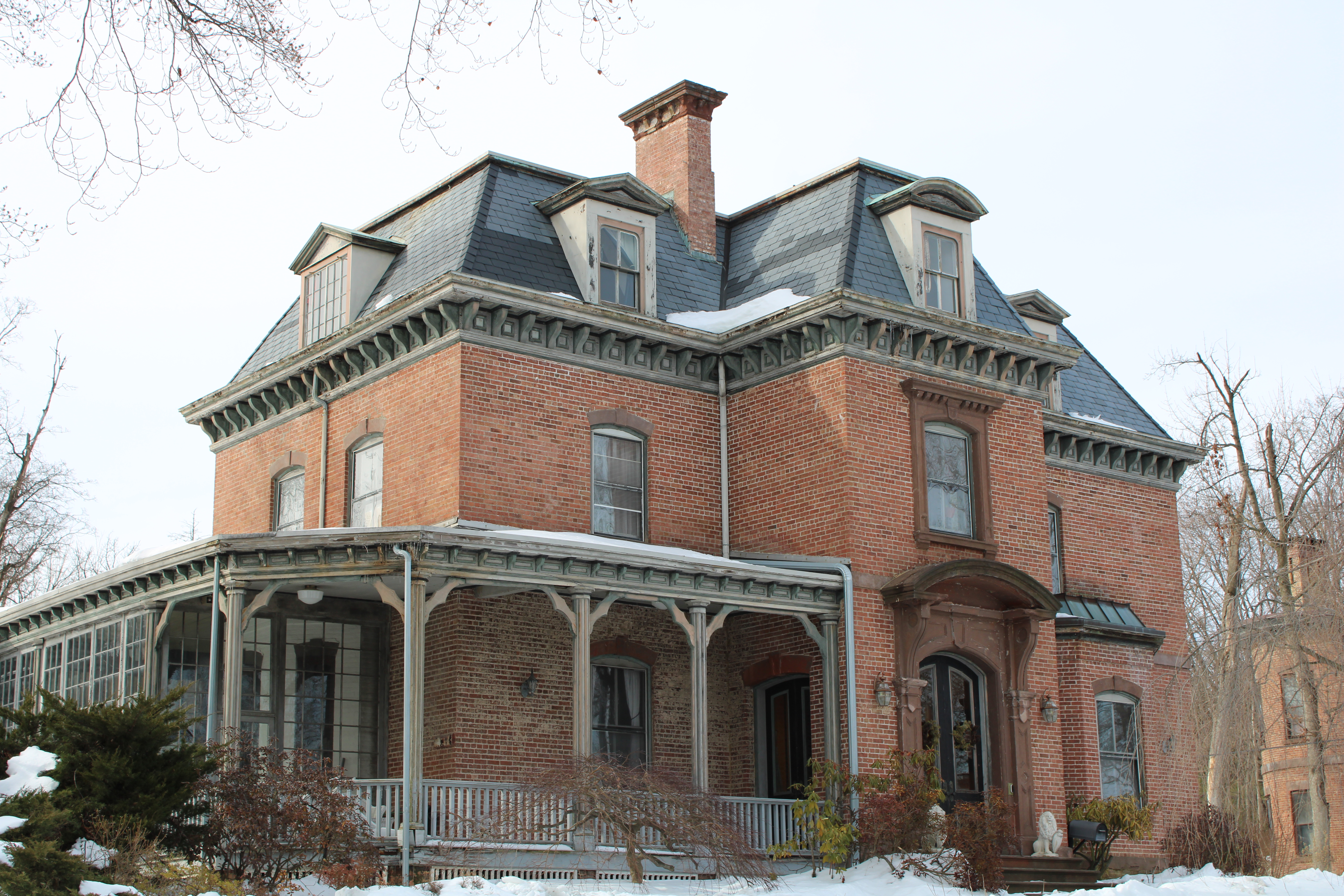
The Fullerton mansion today

In 1876, Fullerton teamed up with his brother, Judge Stephen W. Fullerton, in a sensational divorce case involving Robert H. Berdell, a former President of the Erie Railroad and a leading citizen of Goshen, New York. The lurid accusations as well as Berdell's business history brought national attention to the case. Although the Fullerton brothers were successful on Mrs. Berdell's behalf, the trial was followed a few months later by Berdell shooting and killing Wisner Murray, his former brother-in-law, who was the village President of Goshen. Associated litigation continued for nearly 20 years.

Fullerton's career spanned more than 50 years and encompassed a wide array of high-profile cases. In 1885, he represented the Englishwoman Lucille "Yseult" Dudley, who had tried to shoot Irish nationalist Jeremiah O'Donovan Rossa

Fullerton is commemorated by The Fullerton, a nonprofit formerly headquartered in the mansion he built before the Civil War. It stands on Grand Street in Newburgh, and is currently owned privately. Fullerton's only son, William Fullerton, Jr., was a composer who spent most of his adult years abroad. His death at age 34 put an end to a promising career.

Fullerton died in 1900 at the age of 82 and is buried alongside his wife Cornelia (Gale) at Saint George's Cemetery in Newburgh.
