= The White Heather (play) =

1897 melodrama

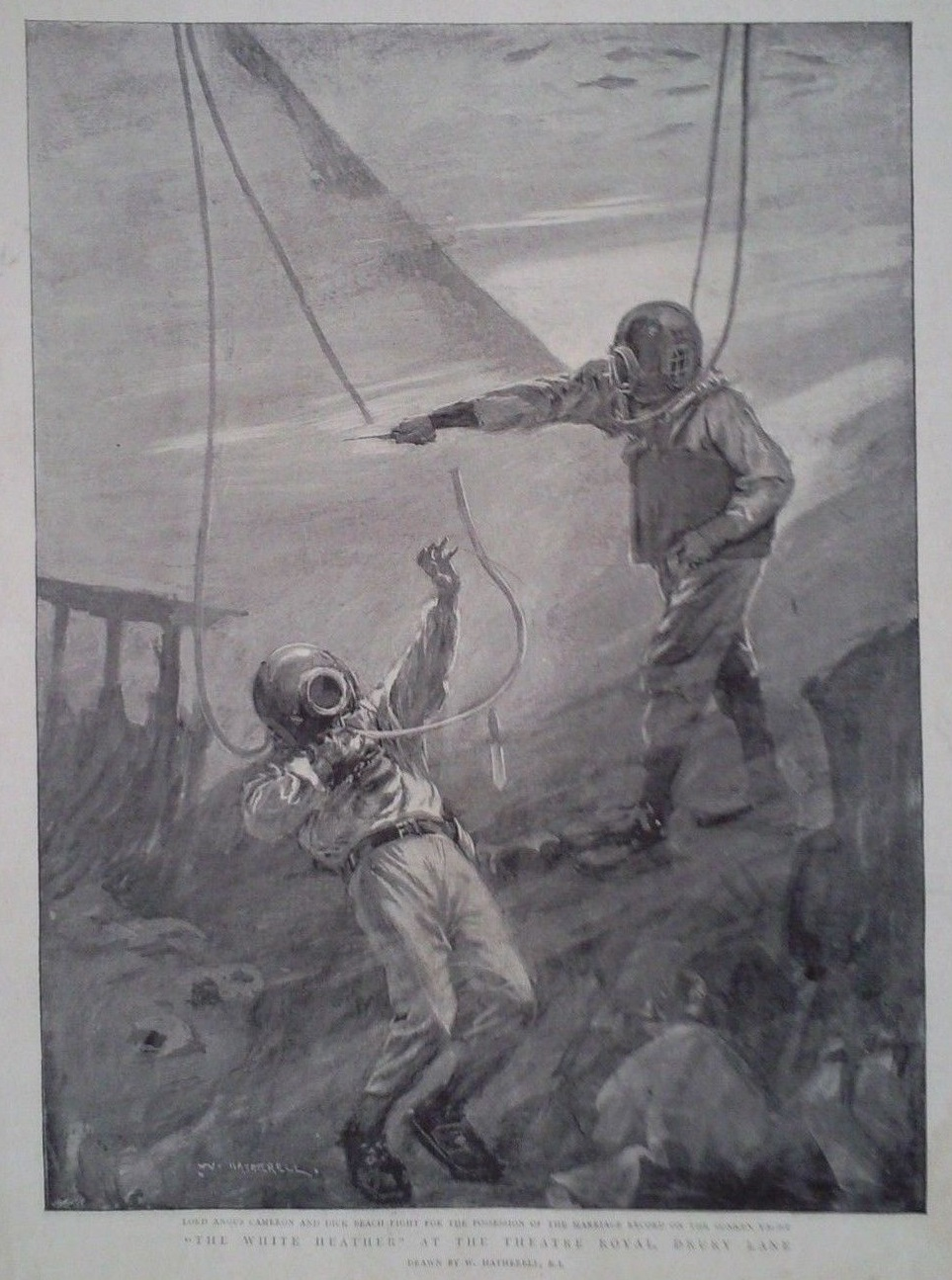
- The climactic scene from The White Heather
- Original language: English
- Written by: Cecil Raleigh and Henry Hamilton
- Genre: Melodrama

Premiere
- Date: 16 September 1897
- Place: Theatre Royal, Drury Lane, London

The White Heather is an 1897 melodrama by playwrights Cecil Raleigh and Henry Hamilton. The climactic scene of the play portrays a fight between two underwater divers.

== Background ==
The play debuted at Drury Lane on 16 September 1897, the first produced by new managing director Arthur Collins. Typical of Drury Lane shows of the period, the elaborate production ran for four hours, and included scenes set at the Stock Exchange, Battersea Park, Boulter's Lock, and the Devonshire House Ball of 1897. It had an initial run of 91 performances until 15 December 1897 and returned for 43 more performances from 12 May to 25 June 1898. The Princess's Theatre revived the play in 1899 with Eily Malyon in the cast for 31 performances.

Upon its debut in London, Charles Frohman's London representative William Lestocq immediately acquired the American rights. The play was also a success in New York, with a run at the Academy of Music on Broadway from 22 November 1897 to 30 April 1898, for a total of 187 performances. The production was directed by Joseph Humphreys and used sets by the painter Ernest Albert.

In 1919 it was adapted into a silent film of the same name that was directed by Maurice Tourneur.

== Original London cast ==
The primary cast included Mrs. John Wood, Henry Neville, Beatrice Lamb, Patti Browne, Kate Rorke, Dawson Milward, and Robert Loraine.

- Lord Angus Cameron by Henry Neville
- Edgar Trefusis by Herman de Lange
- Captain Alec MacLintock by Dawson Milward
- Dick Beach by Robert Loraine
- James Hume by J.B. Gordon
- Captain Dewar Gay by C.M. Lowne
- Horace Saxonby by Ernest Lawford
- Jack Sadler by Albert Mayer
- Duke of Shetland by Rosier
- Jackson by Howard Russell
- Dr. Blake by Akerman May
- Mr. Craven by Edwin Palmer
- Hudson by Edward Shrimpton
- Turner by Frank Damer
- Max Leclare by Alfred Balfour
- William Smart by R.A. Lyons
- Lady Janet MacLintock by Mrs. John Wood
- Marion Hume by Kate Rorke
- Lady Molly Fanshaw by Pattie Browne
- Lady Hermione de Vaux by Beatrice Lamb
- Hon. Blanche Rossiter by Lillian Menelly
- Donald by Valli Valli
- Lady Lumley by Mary Brough
- Mrs. Andrews by Mrs. E. Palmer

== Original New York cast ==
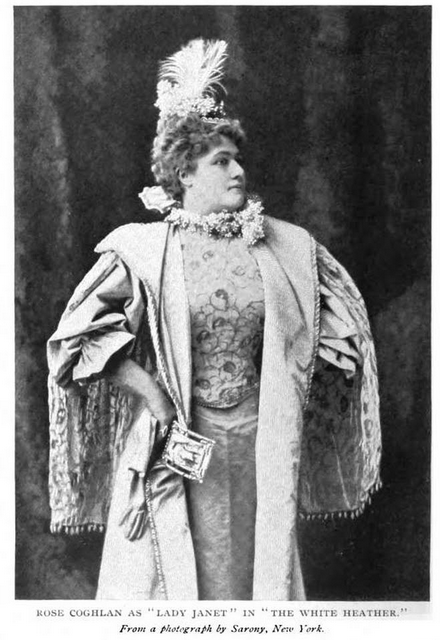
Rose Coghlan as Lady Janet in New York production

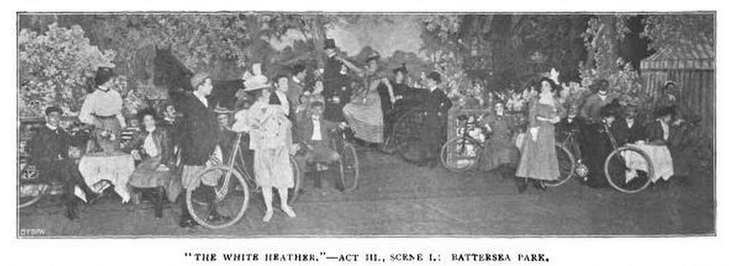
Battersea Park scene in New York production

- Lady Janet Maclintock by Rose Coghlan
- Marion Hume by Amelia Bingham
- Lady Mollie Fanshawe by Olive May
- Lady Hermonie de Vaux by Madeline Bouton
- Mrs. Andrew by Annie Adams
- Lord Angus Cameron by Francis Carlyle
- Edgar Trefusis by Robert Cotton
- Captain Alec Maclintock by Miller Kent
- Dick Beach by Richard Bennett
- James Hume by Harry Harwood
- Captain Dewar Gay by Lewis Baker
- The Duke of Shetland by Frank Burbeck
- Dr. Blake by Robert Jenkins
- Mr. Craven by Douglas Lloyd
- Hudson by E.Y. Backus
