= Bakst =

Bakst is a surname. Notable people with the surname include:

- Isaac Moses Bakst (died 1882), Russian educator
- Léon Bakst (1866–1924), Russian painter and scene and costume designer
- Ryszard Bakst (1926–1999), British pianist and piano music teacher of Jewish/Polish/Russian origin
