= The White Heather =

1919 American film by Maurice Tourneur

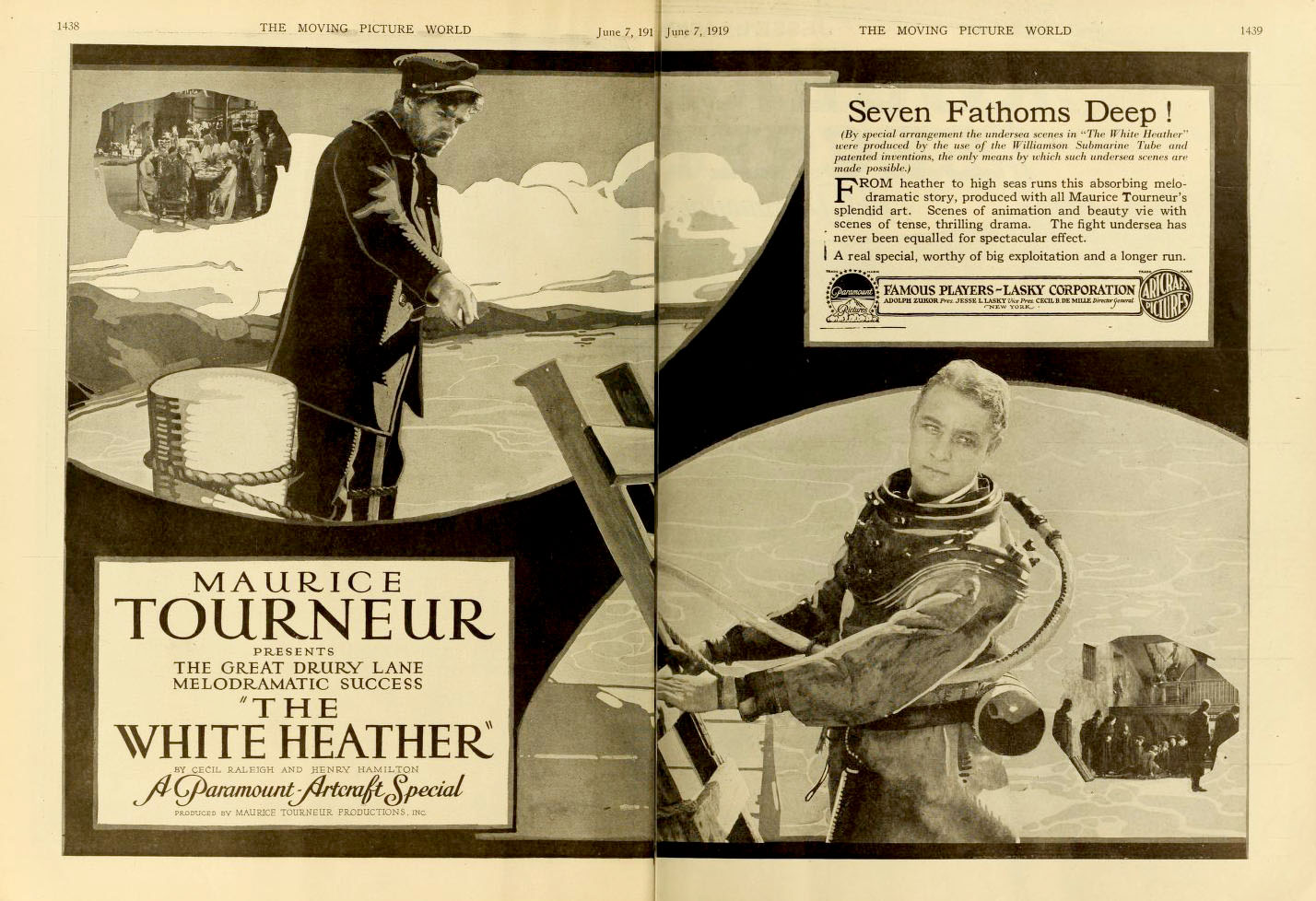
- Advertisement for the film in the June 7, 1919 issue of the Moving Picture World
- Directed by: Maurice Tourneur
- Written by: Charles E. Whittaker
- Based on: The White Heather by Cecil Raleigh and Henry Hamilton
- Produced by: Maurice Tourneur
- Starring: Holmes Herbert; Ben Alexander; Ralph Graves; Mabel Ballin
- Cinematography: René Guissart; Harold S. Sintzenich
- Production company: Maurice Tourneur Productions
- Distributed by: Famous Players–Lasky Corporation
- Release date: June 29, 1919
- Running time: 70 minutes
- Country: United States
- Language: Silent (English intertitles)

The White Heather is a 1919 American silent drama film directed by Maurice Tourneur and starring Holmes Herbert, Ben Alexander and Ralph Graves. It was based on an 1897 play of the same title by Cecil Raleigh and Henry Hamilton. The future matinee idol John Gilbert appeared in a supporting part.

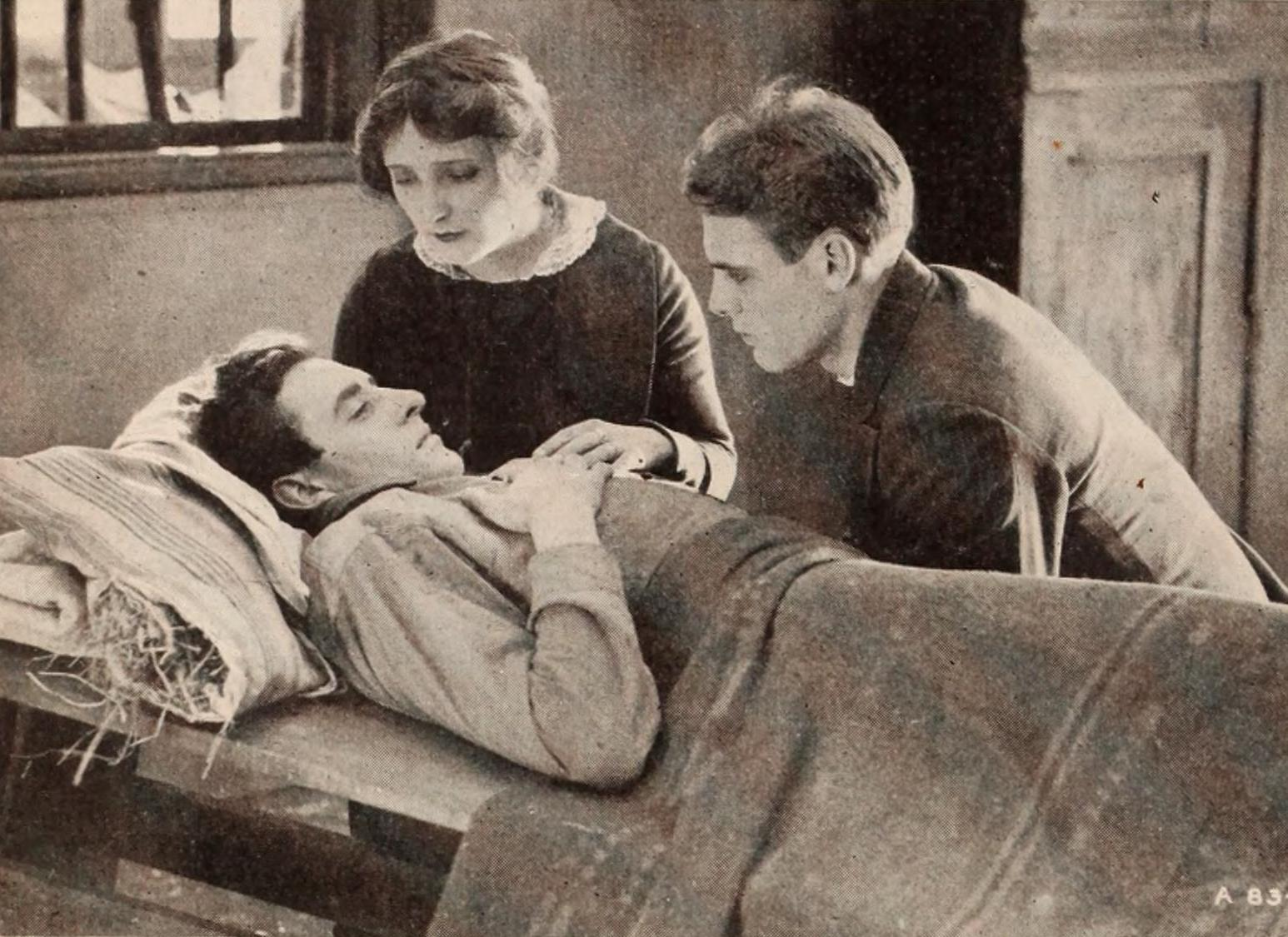
Scene from the film.

== Plot ==
As described in a film magazine, Lord Angus Cameron of the White Heather country finds himself seriously embarrassed financially during a stock exchange panic and goes to Donald Cameron on his country estate for a loan. Donald refuses because Angus will not contract a favorable marriage with one of his class. With ruin facing him, Angus decides to rid himself of a secret marriage made with his housekeeper Marion Hume on his yacht before it was sunk.

Documentary evidence of the marriage now lies many fathoms underwater, and one witness is dead while another, a sailor, has vanished on some voyage. During a hunt Angus accidentally shoots his son from the marriage, leading Marion to announce it to save her injured son. Angus denies the marriage, so Marion goes to her father James Hume, while two admirers of Marion hunt for the missing witness in the London underworld.

Her father fights for his daughter's honor in court, but the case is lost for lack of evidence, and he is ruined on the exchange, dying when he is unable to meet his liabilities. When the missing witness is found, Angus bribes him to disappear. There remain only the papers in a chest on the sunken yacht, and diving operations are ongoing. The two admirers and Lord Angus hasten to the scene. One of the admirers dives on the yacht as does Angus armed with a knife. During an underwater struggle Angus accidentally cuts his own air hose and is killed.

The admirer returns to the surface with the proof of the marriage and claims Marion for himself, while the second admirer dies while also confessing his love.

== Cast ==
- Holmes Herbert as Lord Angus Cameron
- Ben Alexander as Donald Cameron
- Ralph Graves as Alec McClintock
- Mabel Ballin as Marion Hume
- John Gilbert as Dick Beach
- Spottiswoode Aitken as James Hume

== Preservation ==
The White Heather was considered to be a lost film for many years, but in 2023 a copy was rediscovered. The film will be preserved by The San Francisco Silent Film Festival under a grant awarded by The National Film Preservation Foundation.

== Bibliography ==
- Waldman, Harry. Maurice Tourneur: The Life and Films. McFarland, 2008.
