= Cecil Raleigh =

British actor and playwright

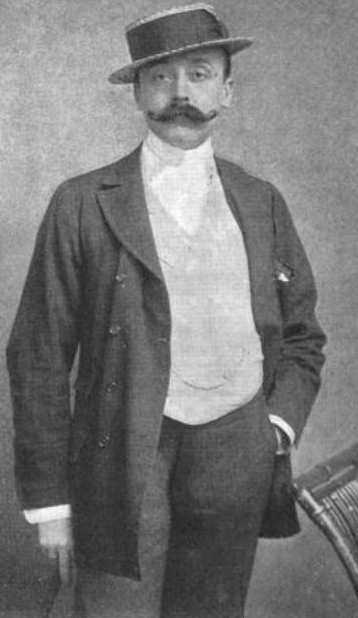
- In The Sketch, 13 September 1899
- Born: Abraham Cecil Francis Fothergill Rowlands; 27 January 1856; Monmouthshire. England
- Died: 10 November 1914 (aged 58); London, England
- Occupations: Actor, playwright
- Spouses: Effie Adelaide Henderson (m. 1882, divorced) Isabel Pauline Ellissen (m. 1894)

Cecil Raleigh was the pseudonym of Abraham Cecil Francis Fothergill Rowlands (27 January 1856 – 10 November 1914), an English actor and playwright.

== Personal life ==
Abraham Cecil Francis Fothergill Rowlands was born on 27 January 1856 in Monmouthshire, the son of Cecilia Anne Daniel Riley (1813–1911) and her second husband Dr. John Fothergill Rowlands (1823–1878). He took the stage name of Cecil Raleigh. On 19 December 1882, he married Effie Adelaide Henderson (1859 – 16 October 1936), a British novelist who published as Effie Adelaide Rowlands and later E. Maria Albanesi, whom he later divorced. On 31 March 1894, he remarried Isabel Pauline Ellissen (8 August 1862 – 22 August 1923), an actress under the stage name Saba Raleigh.

Cecil Raleigh died in London on 10 November 1914.

== Career ==
He played for a time in musical theatre, but deserted acting for playwriting and, either alone or in collaboration, produced melodramas, other plays and musical pieces, staged at first chiefly at the Comedy Theatre, London, and in later years at Drury Lane.

Cheer, Boys, Cheer (1895); Hearts are Trumps (1899); The Best of Friends (1902); and The Whip (1909–10) are typical examples of his plays, but he was particularly successful with his musical pieces, Little Christopher Columbus (1893), Dick Whittington and His Cat (1894), The Yashmak (1897) and The Sunshine Girl (1912).

Several of his plays were later made into motion pictures. He acted as dramatic critic in two or three London papers, and became secretary to the School of Dramatic Art in Gower Street, London.

== Plays ==
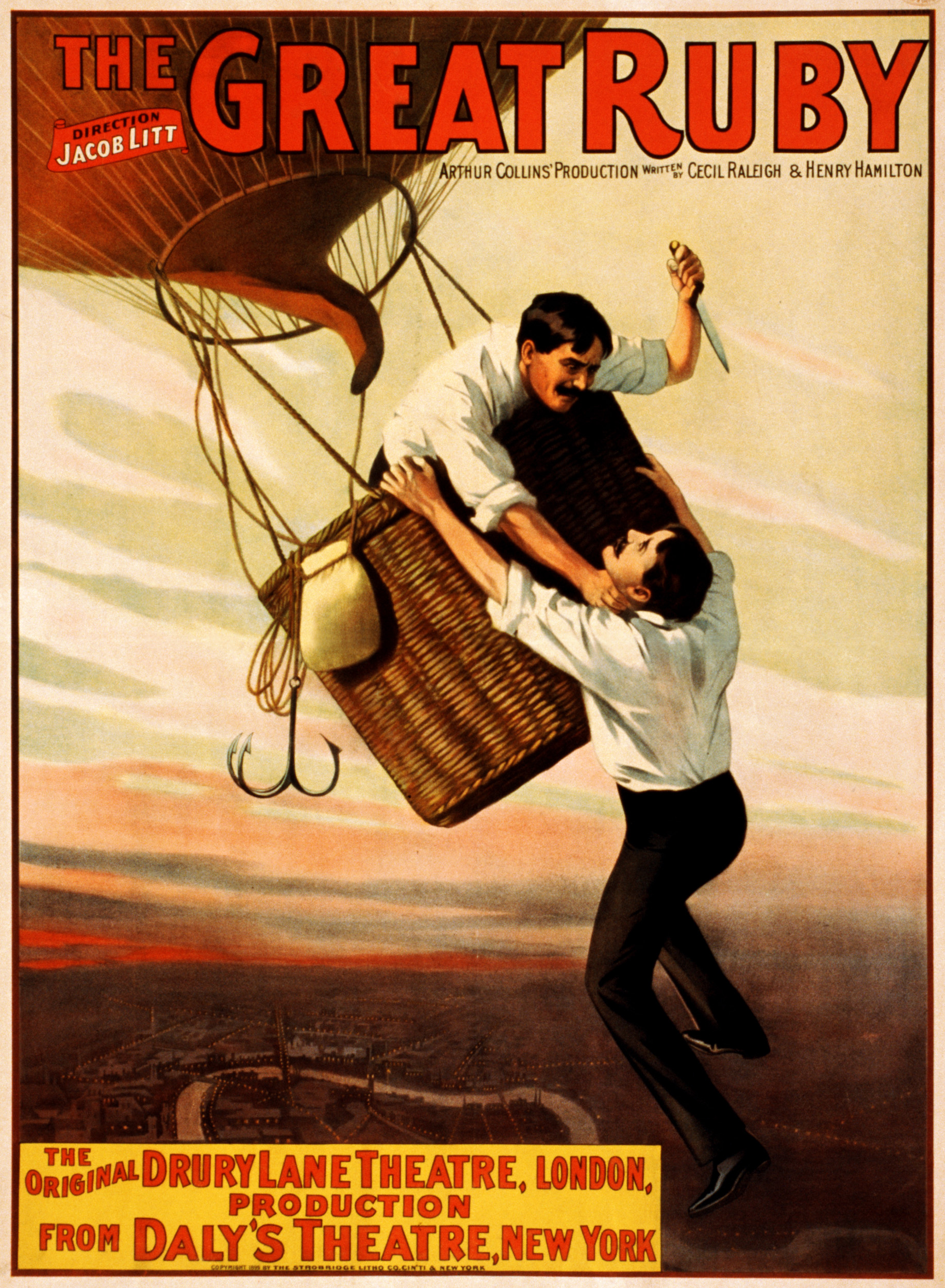
Theatrical poster for The Great Ruby

- The Derby Winner, 1894, co-written with Hamilton and Augustus Harris, produced in the United States under the title The Sporting Duchess and adapted for film in 1915 and 1920
- Cheer, Boys, Cheer, with Harris and Hamilton, 1895
- The White Heather, 1897, with Hamilton, the basis for the 1919 silent film
- The Great Ruby, 1898, with Hamilton, the basis for the 1915 silent film
- Hearts Are Trumps, 1900, the basis for the 1920 silent film
- The Sins of Society, 1909, with Hamilton, the basis for the 1915 silent film
- The Whip, 1909, with Henry Hamilton, the basis for silent films of 1917 and 1928
- The King's Minister, the basis for the 1914 silent film
- Sealed Orders, 1915, with Hamilton, adapted for the 1918 film Stolen Orders
- Sporting Life, with Seymour Hicks, the basis for silent films of 1918 and 1925
- The Marriages of Mayfair, the basis for the 1920 silent film The Fatal Hour
- The Hope, with Hamilton, the basis for the 1920 silent film
- The Best of Luck, with Hamilton, the basis for the 1920 silent film
- The Best of Friends
- The Price of Peace
- The Grey Mare, with George Robert Sims
- The Guardsman, with Sims

== Musical theatre ==
- Little Christopher Columbus, 1893 burlesque, co-written with Sims
- Dick Whittington and His Cat, 1894 pantomime, co-written with Augustus Harris and Hamilton
- The Belle of Cairo, 1896, musical comedy, with music and lyrics by F. Kinsey Peile
- The Yashmak, 1897 musical, co-written with Seymour Hicks
- The Sunshine Girl, 1912 Edwardian musical comedy, book co-written with Paul A. Rubens
