= Isaac Moses Bakst =

Personal life
- Born: Isaac Moses Bakst; 1811
- Died: June 18, 1882 (age 71) Zhitomir, Volhynian Governorate, Russian Empire
- Children: Nicolai Bakst

Religious life
- Religion: Judaism

Isaac Moses Bakst (Yiddish: יצחק משה באקשט; died June 18, 1882) was a lecturer at the Jewish Rabbinical College of Zhitomir. He wrote Sefer ha-Ḥinnuḥ (Zhitomir, 1868), a Hebrew textbook for beginners, adapted for Jewish Russian schools. For many years he owned a Hebrew printing-office in Zhitomir.
