= May Agnes Fleming =

Canadian novelist (1840–1880)

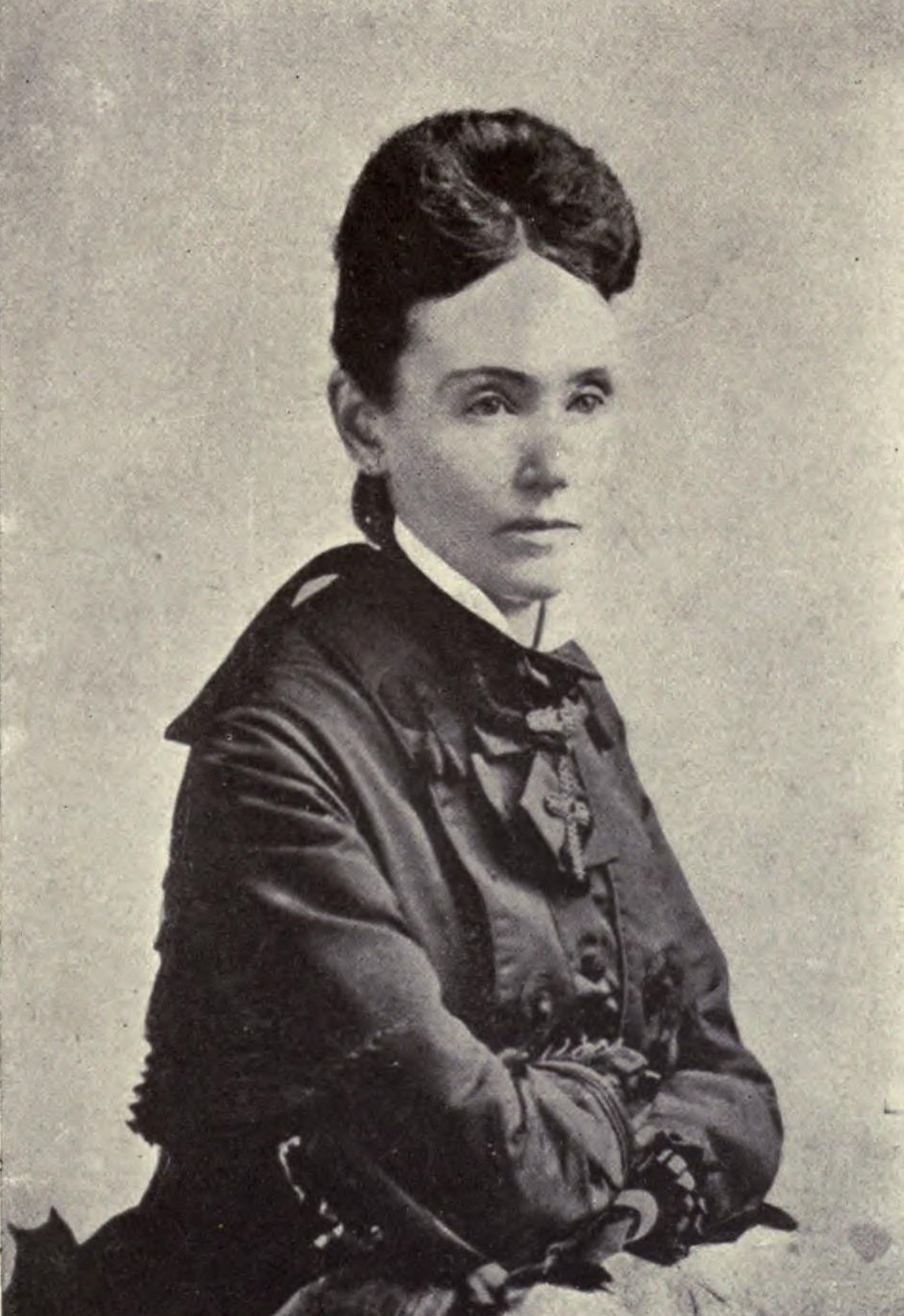
- Born: May Agnes Earlie; November 15, 1840; Carleton, New Brunswick, British North America
- Died: March 24, 1880 (aged 39); Brooklyn
- Resting place: Calvary Cemetery, Brooklyn
- Occupation: Writer
- Spouse: John W. Fleming
- Children: 4
- Writing career
- Pen name: Cousin May Carleton; M. A. Earlie
- Genre: Dime novel romance

May Agnes Fleming (pseudonyms, Cousin May Carleton, M. A. Earlie; November 15, 1840 – March 24, 1880) was a Canadian novelist. She was "one of the first Canadians to pursue a highly successful career as a writer of popular fiction."

== Biography ==
May Agnes Early was born in Carleton, West Saint John, in the Colony of New Brunswick, the daughter of Bernard and Mary Early. May Agnes began publishing while studying at school. She married an engineer, John W. Fleming, in 1865. She moved to New York two years after her first novel, Erminie; or The gypsy's vow: a tale of love and vengeance was published there (1863).

Under the pseudonym "Cousin May Carleton", she published several serial tales in the New York Mercury and the New York Weekly. Twenty-one were printed in book form, seven posthumously. She also wrote under the pseudonym, "M.A. Earlie". The exact count is unclear, since her works were often retitled, but is estimated at around 40, although some were not actually written by her, but were attributed to her by publishers cashing in on her popularity. At her peak, she was earning over $10,000 yearly, due to publishers granting her exclusive rights to her work.

She died in Brooklyn, of Bright's disease.

== Selected works ==
- Silver Star; Or, The Mystery of Fontelle Hall: A Tale of New Jersey in the Olden Time (1861)
- The Queen of the Isle, Or, Sybil Campbell (1861) A.K.A. An Awful Mystery; or Sybil Campbell, the Queen of the Isle. A.K.A. The Queen of the Isle, Or, Sybil Campbell
- Victoria; Or, The Heiress of Castle Cliff (1862)
- The Baronet's Bride; Or, A Woman's Vengeance (1868)
- Estella's Husband; Or, Thrice Lost, Thrice Won (1869)
- Lady Evelyn; Or The Lord of Royal Rest (1869)
- Magdalen's Vow (1871)
- Guy Earlscourt's Wife (1873)
- A Wonderful Woman (1873)
- A Terrible Secret (1874)
- A Mad Marriage (1875)
- The Midnight Queen (1876)
- Kate Danton; Or, Captain Danton's Daughters (1876)
- Silent and True; Or, A Little Queen (1877)
- The Heir of Charlton (1878)
- Carried by Storm; Or, Sleaford's Joanna (1878)
- The Three Cousins; Or, Life at Hinton Hall (1878)
- Lost for a Woman (1880)
- A Wife's Tragedy (1881)
- The Unseen Bridegroom; Or, Wedded for a Week (1881)
- Sharing Her Crime (1882)
- The Secret Sorrow / A Fateful Abduction (1883)
- A Wronged Wife (1883)
- Sir Noel's Heir (1887)
- Who Wins; Or, The Secret of Monkswood Waste (1895)
- The Actress' Daughter (1895)
