= The Sporting Duchess (1920 film) =

1920 film

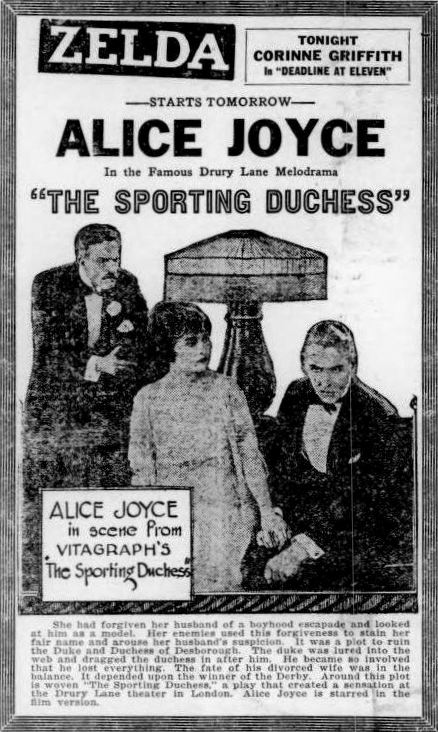
- Cinema advertisement
- Directed by: George Terwilliger
- Written by: Lucien Hubbard
- Based on: The Sporting Duchess by Henry Hamilton, Cecil Raleigh, and Augustus Thomas
- Produced by: Vitagraph Company of America
- Starring: Alice Joyce; Percy Marmont
- Cinematography: Joe Shelderfer; Charles Davis
- Distributed by: Vitagraph Company of America
- Release date: February 29, 1920
- Running time: 7 reels
- Country: United States
- Language: Silent (English intertitles)

The Sporting Duchess is a lost 1920 American silent drama film directed by George Terwilliger and starring Alice Joyce. It is based on the 1895 play The Sporting Duchess by Henry Hamilton, Cecil Raleigh, and Augustus Thomas. It was produced and released by the Vitagraph Company of America.

== Cast ==
- Alice Joyce as Muriel, Duchess of Desborough
- Percy Marmont as Douglas, Duke of Desborough
- Gustav von Seyffertitz as Major Roland Mostyn
- Edith Campbell as Mrs. Delmaine
- Lionel Pape as Captain Cyprian Streatfield
- John Goldsworthy as Rupert Leigh
- Dan Comfort as Harold
- May McAvoy as Mary Alymer
- Robert Agnew as Dick Hammond
- William H. Turner as Joseph Aylmer
- Edward Keenan as Jockey
- C. T. Elmer
