= The Sporting Duchess (play) =

Play

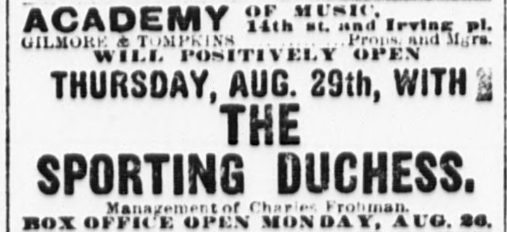
- Advertisement for opening of the play in The New York Sun
- Written by: Cecil Raleigh, Henry Hamilton and Augustus Thomas

Premiere
- Date: August 29, 1895 (originally played as The Derby Winner before this in London)
- Place: Academy of Music

The Sporting Duchess is an 1895 play by Cecil Raleigh, Henry Hamilton and Augustus Thomas. In England it was titled The Derby Winner and played at Drury Lane.

== Production ==
Because Hammerstein's Harlem Opera House opened a play called The Derby Winner in February 1895, the name of the English play had to be changed, with the New York World approving it with "apologies to Sir Gus, that seems to be a much more fascinating title."

Produced by Charles Frohman, it ran for 212 performances in New York at the Academy of Music, debuting on August 29, 1895, and was the second longest Broadway production of the year, after The Heart of Maryland. Twenty horses appeared in the race scene. The show closed on February 29, 1896. Then going on tour, the play's first stop was a successful run at the Walnut Street Theatre in Philadelphia.

== Reception ==
Alan Dale of The New York World reviewed the play for the melodramatic spectacle it was, writing: " 'The Sporting Duchess' absolutely defies criticism, for its materials have been written about for decades. It doesn't contain one gleam of anything that is new, for it is composed principally of the best bits of other melodramas. Everything is there--mortgages, encumbered estates, the wronged lady who can no longer conceal her condition, the sorrowing popper, who clinches his fist and sets his lip as he talks of poor Mary; the devilish adventuress with the devilish cigarette; the impecunious earl, the trained race horses (oh! hang the cable and trolley that have let them loose; if we must have them let it be in sausages), and last, but not least, the villain who goes about ruining pretty ladies just because tradition says that he has got to do so." Yet, he admitted the play was a "handsome spectacle" with a cast that was "the very best that the market can supply in or out of season."

As the play's run stretched into 1896, the Sun noted it was "now the senior play as to continuous use in town. The reason for this long popularity lies about equally in the excellent acting and the realistic scenes, both being far better than the matter of the drama proper."

== Adaptations ==
The play was adapted into silent films of the same name in 1915, starring Rose Coghlan and Ethel Clayton, and in 1920, starring Alice Joyce.

== Broadway cast ==
- E. J. Ratcliffe as Earl of Desborough
- Roy Richardson as Viscount Fernside
- Alfred Fisher as Colonel Donelly
- Francis Carlyle as Major Mostyn
- W.D. Hanbury as Lord Chisholm
- William Harcourt as Rubert Leigh
- R.A. Roberts as Cyprian Streatfield
- J.H. Stoddart as Joe Aylmer
- H.D. Gibbs as Dick Hammond
- Agnes Booth as Duchess of Milford
- Cora Tanner as Countess of Desborough
- Agnes Proctor as Mrs. Donelly
- Jessie Busley as Annette Donelly
- Margaret Robinson as Mary Aylmer
- Alice Fisher as Vivian Darville
