= Henry Hamilton (playwright) =

English playwright

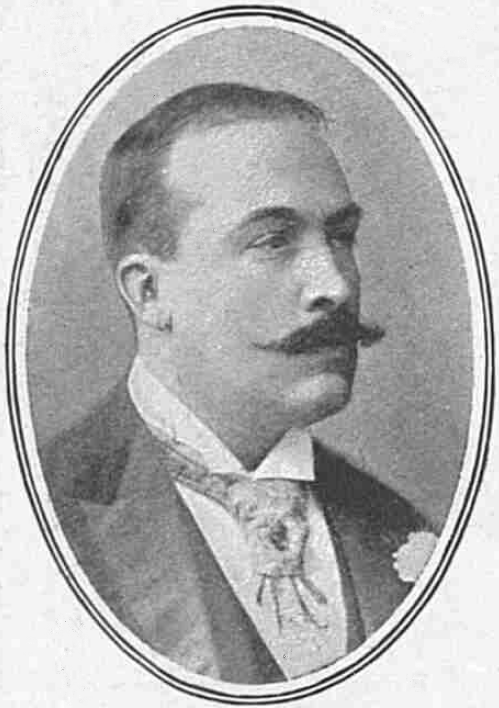
Henry Hamilton (from The Sketch, 1909)

Henry Hamilton (c. 1854 – 4 September 1918) was an English playwright, lyricist and actor. He is best remembered for his musical theatre libretti, including The Duchess of Dantzic (1903), The School Girl (1903), Véronique (1905) and The Little Michus (1907), often adapting foreign works for the British stage.

He began as an actor in 1873 but turned to writing plays in 1881 and was especially successful in the first decade of the 20th century. He was also the author of the popular song "Private Tommy Atkins" (1893). Away from his professional life, Hamilton studied theosophy.

== Early life and acting ==
Hamilton was born in late 1854 or early 1855 at Nunhead, Surrey, (Note: The civil registration index for Hamilton's birth confirms he was born in the Camberwell Registration District (of which Nunhead is a part) between mid-November 1854 and mid-March 1855.) to James Hamilton and his second wife Janette (née Ferguson) and baptised 14 March 1855 at St Mary Magdalen, Peckham, Surrey. His father is described as a gentleman, a merchant and, in his death announcement, formerly of the Hon. East Indian Civil Service. Within a year of Henry's baptism, James had died, aged 46. Hamilton's mother married Daniel Ilett in October 1865, and Hamilton was sent to Christ's Hospital for his education.

As an actor, he debuted in 1873 at the Theatre Royal, Edinburgh under J. B. Howard's management. Later that year he joined the touring comedy company of Wilson Barrett, and he was engaged by Craven Robertson's Caste touring company in 1874. In 1876, Hamilton formed the Pitt-Hamilton comedy drama company with Henry Mader Pitt, which toured the North of England for two years. His first appearance in London was at the Lyceum Theatre in 1878 playing Snodgrass in the Pickwickian farcical comedy Jingle, with Henry Irving, and he appeared later that year at the Theatre Royal, Drury Lane for a season.

By 1880, Hamilton had joined Barry Sullivan's Shakespearan company, with which he played Horatio in Hamlet and Gratiano in The Merchant of Venice at Leicester's Theatre Royal. Later that year, he played minor roles in a comedy, False Shame, at the Royalty Theatre, and after Christmas he appeared in a short season "of favourite pieces" starring Helen Barry at the Warrior Square Concert Rooms in St Leonards-on-Sea. In 1881 Hamilton joined the touring company of Miss Wallis, playing Shakespeare and other works, before taking a variety of roles in a summer season at Brighton's Theatre Royal. Later that year he played Alfred de Maynard in a revival of The Corsican Brothers at the Queens Theatre, Manchester. The play initiated a professional relationship between Hamilton and Marie Litton, who engaged Hamilton to act with her in Goldsmith's She Stoops to Conquer and Merivale's The Cynic, both produced under her management at the Globe Theatre in London. They acted together again in Hamilton's Moths and took the play on tour until December 1882.

== Playwright and lyricist ==
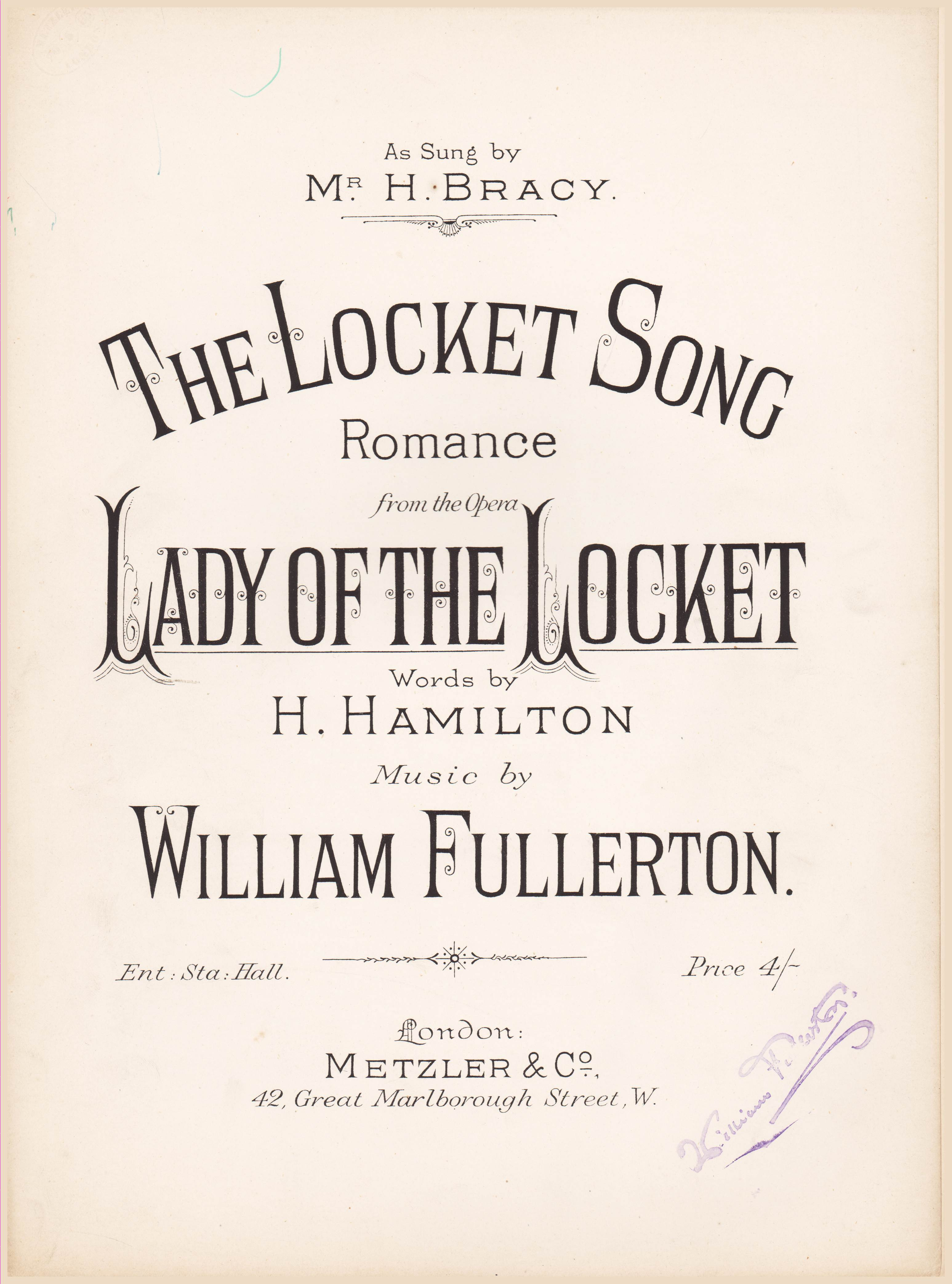
Song from Lady of the Locket, 1885

"Not being a great actor", Hamilton began to diversify. In November 1881 he sold his first play, A Shadow Sceptre, to the producer Charles Bernard for his leading lady Annie Alleyn. His second play, Moths, was an adaptation of the 1880 novel of the same name by Ouida centred on the idle and pleasure-seeking European aristocracy. The two plays were staged within three weeks of each other – Moths at the Globe Theatre on 25 March 1882 and A Shadow Sceptre at the Prince's Theatre, Manchester, on 13 April. The production of Moths was prefaced by a virulent argument between Ouida and Hamilton conducted publicly in The Era concerning copyright theft and the right to adapt works. The dispute inadvertently benefited both novel and play.

One reviewer of Moths declared that "a more inartistic finale has seldom been put on the stage", while another thought the treatment "appropriate and undeniably dramatic". A third critic concluded that Hamilton, having followed the plot of the novel closely, "produced a passable play, which promises to become a popular but ... certainly not an artistic, success" and lost the spirit of Ouida's work. Moths transferred to the Olympic Theatre where it continued to attract large audiences. A Shadow Sceptre was a four-act historical play, set in the world of Lady Jane Grey in the Court of Queen Mary. The Era thought it well written and staged, with only minor faults. The paper stated that, although Hamilton's inexperience meant that this work could "scarcely be spoken of in terms of unqualified praise", it admired the "courage which has led him to take so high a flight". It looked forward "with both interest and pleasure" to further work from Hamilton.

His next play, Our Regiment, was a farce adaptation of the 1881 German play, Krieg im Frieden by Gustav von Moser and Franz von Schönthau, which had previously been adapted in English as The Passing Regiment in New York. Hamilton's adaptation was first staged at a Vaudeville Theatre matinée on 13 February 1883; it also had two London revivals and a successful provincial run the next year.

Hamilton then wrote the libretto for William Fullerton's successful comic opera Lady of the Locket, staged at The Empire Theatre on 11 March 1885, before penning "an independent and ambitious dramatic work of his own", Harvest, that premiered at the Princess's Theatre on 18 September 1886. The plot centres around Scottish marriage law. Hamilton then staged the play in New York at Wallack's Theatre beginning on 12 October 1886, playing the character Bevil Brooke; it closed on 3 November 1886.

His 1897 melodrama, The White Heather, written with Cecil Raleigh, at the Theatre Royal, Drury Lane, achieved success in both London and New York. It was adapted as an American silent film in 1919. Thereafter he collaborated with Raleigh several times.

His most popular theatre libretti included The Duchess of Dantzic (1903) and The School Girl (1903), and English adaptations of the French operettas Véronique (1905) and The Little Michus (1907). According to the obituary writer of the Daily Mirror, Hamilton "was a workmanlike constructor of melodrama, as the records of many Drury Lane successes testify. He was also a deft adaptor of French libretti into English and a lyric-writer of no small capability."

He was also the author of the popular song Private Tommy Atkins, music by Samuel Potter, (Note: Potter (1851–1934) wrote music for operettas, dramas, pantomimes and Victorian burlesques.) introduced when interpolated into the musical A Gaiety Girl in 1893. Another jingoistic song penned by Hamilton was Sons of the Motherland, with music by Lionel Monckton, introduced in 1901 into San Toy a year into its run.

== Personal life ==
Away from his professional life, Hamilton studied theosophy and was the first chairman, and latterly the president, of the Folkestone Lodge of the Theosophical Society and a man of deep spiritual convictions. He never married and lived for many years at The Haven, Sandgate, Kent, where he died on 4 September 1918. His funeral took place on 7 September 1918 at Holy Trinity, Folkestone, with the interment at Folkestone Cemetery. Hamilton's friend, the Rev. Gerald Gurney, a former actor, co-officiated at both ceremonies, and Sir Squire Bancroft was a chief mourner.

== Works ==
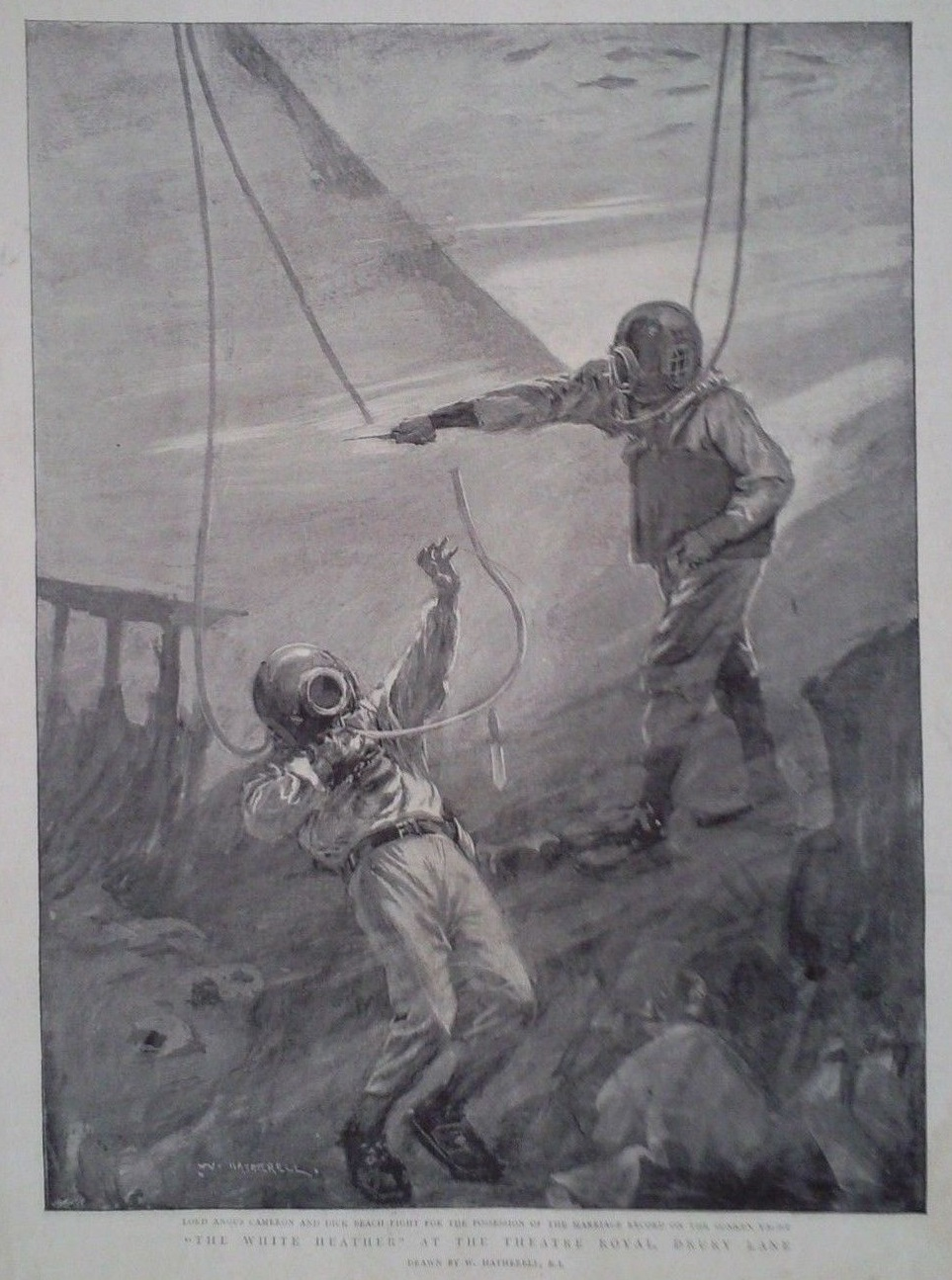
Scene from The White Heather

- Moths, adaptation of Ouida's 1880 novel, mounted at the Globe Theatre in London on 25 March 1882.
- A Shadow Sceptre, a blank verse historical play in four acts, first performed at the Prince's Theatre, Manchester on 13 April 1882.
- Our Regiment, a farcical comedy adapted from a German piece, which was first performed at the Vaudeville Theatre in London on 13 February 1883.
- The Lady of the Locket, comic opera composed by William Fullerton, first staged at the Empire Theatre on 11 March 1885.
- Harvest, play, premiered at the Princess's Theatre on 18 September 1886.
- Handfast, play, written with Mark Quinton, first performed at the Prince of Wales Theatre on 13 December 1887. Revised, it reopened at the Shaftesbury Theatre on 16 May 1891.
- The Royal Oak, a play, written with Sir Augustus Harris and first performed at the Theatre Royal, Drury Lane on 23 September 1889. Adapted as a film of the same name in 1923.
- La Tosca, an English adaptation of Sardou's 1887 five-act melodrama in French. It was first produced at the Garrick Theatre on 28 November 1889.
- Dick Whittington and His Cat, a Drury Lane Theatre pantomime version of this tale, co-written with Augustus Harris and Cecil Raleigh, which opened on Boxing Night 1894.
- The Derby Winner, a sporting melodrama written with Harris and Raleigh, first performed at The Grand Theatre, Islington on 25 February 1895. Retitled, it was mounted as The Sporting Duchess at the New York Academy of Music on 29 August 1895. It was adapted as silent films in 1915 and 1920.
- Carmen, from the eponymous novel by Prosper Mérimée, a play opening on 24 December 1895 at the Empire Theatre, New York, and 6 June 1896 at the Gaiety Theatre, London based on (and including segments from) the opera by Georges Bizet.

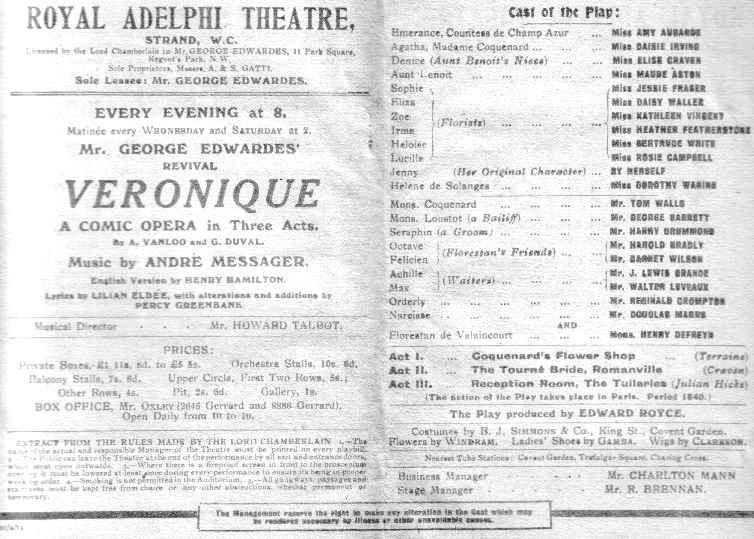
Programme from revival of Veronique at the Adelphi Theatre

- The White Heather, melodrama written with Raleigh, opening on 16 September 1897 at the Drury Lane. Adapted as an American silent film in 1919.
- The Three Musketeers, English play, adapting the novel by Alexandre Dumas, opening at the Theatre Metropole, Camberwell on 12 September 1898. Renamed The King's Musketeer, it was mounted at the Knickerbocker Theatre in New York on 22 February 1899.
- The Great Ruby, a melodramatic play written with Raleigh, was first performed 15 September 1898 at Drury Lane. Adapted as a film of the same name in 1915.
- The Duchess of Dantzic, light opera libretto, with music by Ivan Caryll, was based on the play Madame Sans-Gêne, by Victorien Sardou, and opened at the Lyric Theatre, 17 October 1903.
- The School Girl, Edwardian musical comedy, with book co-written with Paul M. Potter and music by Leslie Stuart. It opened on 9 May 1903 at the Prince of Wales Theatre.
- Veronique, comic opera with music by André Messager. English adaptation of French libretto by Vanloo and Duval. It opened at the Apollo Theatre in London on 18 May 1904.
- The Little Michus, musical comedy with score by Messager. An English adaptation of Albert Vanloo and Georges Duval's libretto which opened at Daly's Theatre on 29 April 1905.
- The Sins of Society, a melodrama written with Raleigh, first staged at Drury Lane from 12 September 1907. It opened on 31 August 1909 at the New York Theatre and was also made into an American silent film of the same name in 1915.
- The Whip, a drama in four acts, written with Raleigh, first performed at Drury Lane on 9 September 1909. It was also made into American silent films in 1917 and 1928.
- A Russian Tragedy, a one act melodrama taken from the German of Adoph Glass's play, produced at His Majesty's Theatre from 25 November 1909. It was first produced in America at New York's Colonial Theatre on 14 February 1910 under the title of Expiation.
- The Hope, play written with Raleigh and first performed at the Drury Lane on 14 September 1911. Adapted as a film of the same name in 1920.
- The Crown of India, an elaborate masque first presented at the Coliseum Theatre on 11 March 1912, for which Hamilton wrote the libretto, including lyrics for songs set to music by Elgar.
- Autumn Manoeuvres, musical play adapted from Tatárjárás by Emmerich Kalman with a Hungarian libretto by Karl von Bakony and R. Bodanskistaged, staged at the Adelphi Theatre on 25 May 1912, with lyrics by Percy Greenbank. A version of Tatárjárás had been produced as The Gay Hussars at the Knickerbocker Theatre in 1909.
- Sealed Orders, a three-act melodrama written with Raleigh and staged at Drury Lane on 11 September 1913. Produced as Stolen Orders on 24 September 1915. made into an American silent film, Stolen Orders in 1918.
- The Best of Luck, play, written with Raleigh and Arthur Collins, which opened on 27 September 1916 at Drury Lane. Adapted as a silent film in America in 1920.

== Sources ==
- Coffin, C. Hayden. Hayden Coffin's Book: Packed with Acts and Facts, London: Alston Rivers (1930)
