= M. M. Mangasarian =

American atheist writer (1859–1943)

Mangasar Magurditch Mangasarian
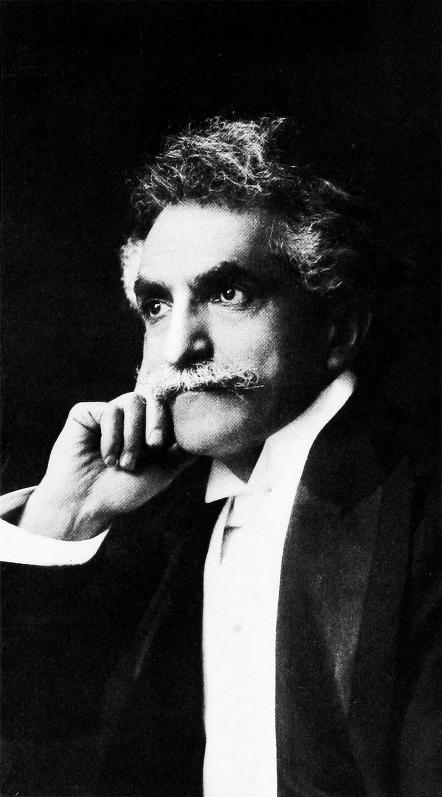
- Born: December 29, 1859; Mashger, Ottoman Empire
- Died: June 26, 1943 (aged 83); Los Angeles, California, U.S.
- Occupations: Rationalist, writer
- Relatives: Flora Zabelle(daughter)

Mangasar Magurditch Mangasarian (December 29, 1859 – June 26, 1943) was an American rationalist and secularist of Armenian descent.

== Biography ==
Born in Mashger (now within Turkey) in the Ottoman Empire, he attended Robert College in Constantinople, and was ordained as minister in Marsovan in 1878. In about 1880 he enrolled at Princeton University. He was pastor at a Presbyterian church in Philadelphia from 1882 to 1885, when he resigned, becoming an independent preacher and a lecturer on "independent religion" in New York. In 1892 he became leader of the Ethical Culture Society of Chicago, a group established by Felix Adler. In 1900 he organized the Independent Religious Society of Chicago, a rationalist group, of which he remained pastor until 1925. He retired to Piedmont, California, where he lived for the rest of his life.

During his life Mangasarian wrote a number of books. His most popular, including The Truth About Jesus – Is He a Myth? (1909) and The Bible Unveiled (1911), deal with the evidence against the existence of an historical Jesus. He also wrote hundreds of essays and lectures on questions of the times. His books and essays were translated into French, German, Spanish, and other foreign languages. The general subject of his writing was religious criticism and the philosophy of religion.

Mangasarian considered himself a Rationalist or a Secularist not an Atheist, since he considered atheism a non-verifiable belief system.

He died at his home in Los Angeles on June 26, 1943.

== Bibliography ==
- A Voice from the Orient (J. G. Ditman, 1885)
- A New Catechism (Chicago: Independent Religious Society, 1902)
- Christian Science, a Comedy in Four Acts (Chicago: Independent Religious Society, 1903)
- Morality Without God: Including Letter to Right Rev. Bishop Anderson (Chicago: Independent Religious Society, 1905)
- The Mangasarian-Crapsey Debate on The Question: "Did Jesus Ever Live?" (Chicago: Independent Religious Society, 1908)
- The Story of My Mind; or, How I Became a Rationalist (Chicago: Independent Religious Society, 1909)
- The Truth About Jesus, Is He a Myth? (Chicago: Independent Religious Society, 1909)
- How the Bible was Invented (Chicago: Independent Religious Society, 1910)
- Is Life Worth Living Without Immortality? (Chicago: Independent Religious Society, 1910)
- The Bible Unveiled (Chicago: Independent Religious Society, 1911)
- The Jesuits and Their Morals, (The Rationalist) (Unknown publisher, 1913)
- The Story of Joan of Arc the Witch-Saint (Chicago: Independent Religious Society, 1913)
- The Irish Question: Report of a Lecture Delivered Before the Independent Religious Society (Chicago: Independent Religious Society, 1919)
- What is Christian Science? (London: Watts & Co, 1922)
- The Neglected Book or The Bible Unveiled (New York: Truth Seeker Company, 1926)

Reprints

- Mangasarian, Mangasar Magurditch (2006). The Truth About Jesus, Is He a Myth?. Charleston, South Carolina: BiblioBazaar. ISBN 1-4264-1499-4.
- Mangasarian, Mangasar Magurditch (2008). How The Bible Was Invented: A Lecture. Whitefish, Montana: Kessinger Publishing. ISBN 978-0-548-90823-5.
- Mangasarian, Mangasar Magurditch (2008). Is Life Worth Living Without Immortality?. Whitefish, Montana: Kessinger Publishing. ISBN 978-0-548-85500-3.
- Mangasarian, Mangasar Magurditch (2008). Morality Without God: Including Letter To Right Reverend Bishop Anderson. Whitefish, Montana: Kessinger Publishing. ISBN 978-0-548-84313-0.
- Mangasarian, Mangasar Magurditch (2008). Rome Rule In Ireland: A Lecture Delivered Before The Independent Religious Society, Orchestra Hall, Chicago (1909). Whitefish, Montana: Kessinger Publishing. ISBN 978-0-548-88281-8.
