= A Perfect 36 =

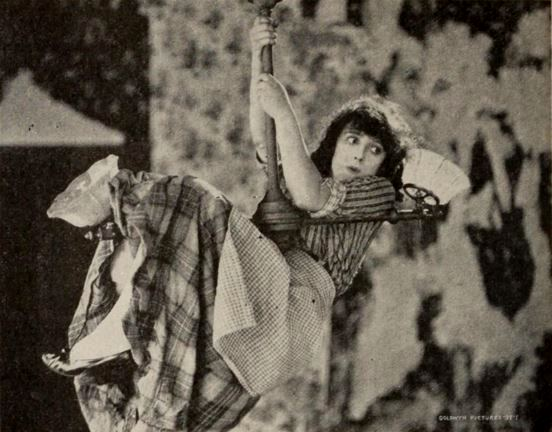
- Film still with Mabel Normand
- Directed by: Charles Giblyn
- Written by: Tex Charwate
- Produced by: Samuel Goldwyn
- Starring: Mabel Normand; Rod La Rocque
- Cinematography: Louis Physioc
- Distributed by: Goldwyn Pictures
- Release date: October 21, 1918
- Running time: 50 minutes
- Country: United States
- Language: Silent (English intertitles)

A Perfect 36 is a 1918 American silent comedy film directed by Charles Giblyn, written by Tex Charwate, and starring Mabel Normand and Rod La Rocque. The plot involves Normand's clothes being stolen in a mixup while she was swimming, necessitating her spending most of the film running around naked trying to straighten everything out.

== Cast ==
- Mabel Normand as Mabel
- Rod La Rocque as O.P. Dildock
- Flora Zabelle as Lena
- Leila Romer as Landlady
- Louis R. Grisel as The Constable
- Edward Bernard as Sol Manheimer

== Reception ==
Like many American films of the time, A Perfect 36 was subject to restrictions and cuts by city and state film censorship boards. For example, the Chicago Board of Censors required a cut, in Reel 4, of four closeups of the young woman on the diving board.
