= Railroaded (film) =

1923 film

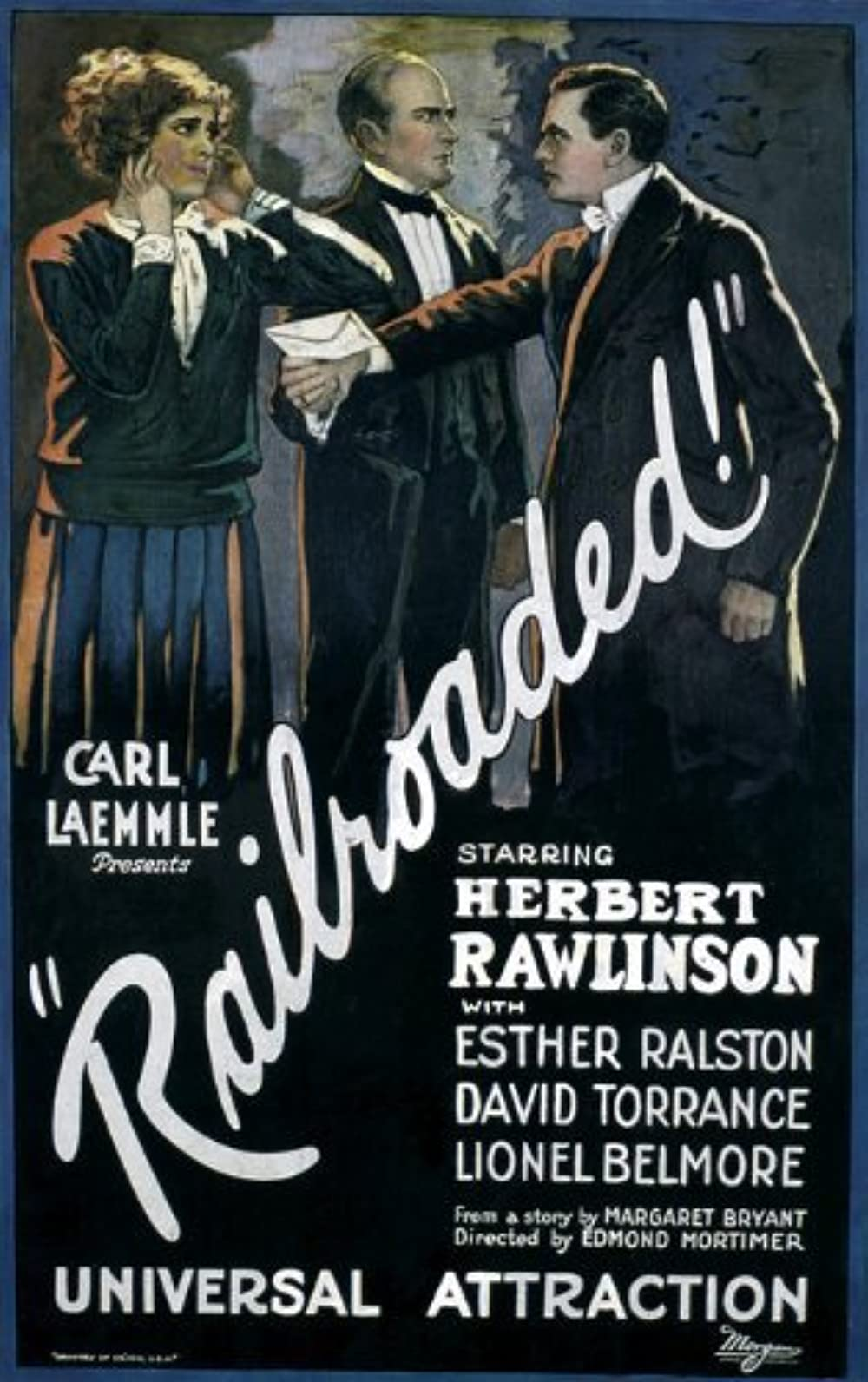
- Directed by: Edmund Mortimer
- Written by: Charles Kenyon
- Based on: novel Richard by Marguerite Bryant
- Produced by: Carl Laemmle
- Starring: Herbert Rawlinson; Esther Ralston; David Torrence
- Cinematography: Allen M. Davey
- Production company: Universal Pictures
- Distributed by: Universal Pictures
- Release date: June 11, 1923
- Running time: 50 minutes
- Country: United States
- Languages: Silent; English intertitles

Railroaded is a lost 1923 American silent drama film directed by Edmund Mortimer and starring Herbert Rawlinson, Esther Ralston and David Torrence.

== Synopsis ==
In England Richard Ragland, the son of a prominent judge, is sent to prison on false evidence. After escaping he changes his name and vows vengeance on the man who put him there.

== Cast ==
- Herbert Rawlinson as Richard Ragland
- Esther Ralston as Joan Dunster
- Alfred Fisher as Hugh Dunster
- David Torrence as Judge Garbin
- Lionel Belmore as Foster
- Mike Donlin as Corton
- Herbert Fortier as Bishop Selby

== Preservation ==
With no holdings located in archives, Railroaded is considered a lost film.

== Bibliography ==
- Connelly, Robert B. The Silents: Silent Feature Films, 1910-36, Volume 40, Issue 2. December Press, 1998.
- Munden, Kenneth White. The American Film Institute Catalog of Motion Pictures Produced in the United States, Part 1. University of California Press, 1997.
