= Bernard H. Hyman =

American film producer

- Born: August 20, 1897; Grafton, West Virginia, United States
- Died: September 7, 1942 (aged 45); Los Angeles, California, United States
- Occupations: Producer, Screenwriter, Director
- Years active: 1922–1940 (film)

Bernard H. Hyman (1897–1942) was an American film producer. Employed by Metro-Goldwyn-Mayer he worked on some of the studios's bigger-budget productions of the 1930s. He was of Jewish heritage. During the silent era he had worked as an occasional screenwriter and in 1925 he directed the film Morals for Men for Tiffany Pictures.

== Selected filmography ==
=== Producer ===
- Rasputin and the Empress (1932)
- The Barbarian (1933)
- Hold Your Man (1933)
- The Cat and the Fiddle (1934)
- Forsaking All Others (1934)
- Tarzan and His Mate (1934)
- Stamboul Quest (1934)
- The Girl from Missouri (1934)
- The Solitaire Man (1934)
- After Office Hours (1935)
- Escapade (1935)
- One New York Night (1935)
- I Live My Life (1935)
- Camille (1936)
- Tarzan Escapes (1936)
- San Francisco (1936)
- Conquest (1937)
- Saratoga (1937)
- The Great Waltz (1938)
- I Take This Woman (1940)

=== Screenwriter and director ===
- Confidence (1922)
- The Black Bag (1922)
- The Married Flapper (1922)
- Morals for Men (1925)

== Bibliography ==
- Connelly, Robert B. The Silents: Silent Feature Films, 1910-36, Volume 40, Issue 2. December Press, 1998.
- Karlinsky, Simon & Appel Jr., Alfred. The Bitter Air of Exile: Russian Writers in the West, 1922-1972. University of California Press, 2023.
