= Margaret Campbell (actress) =

American actress (1883–1939)

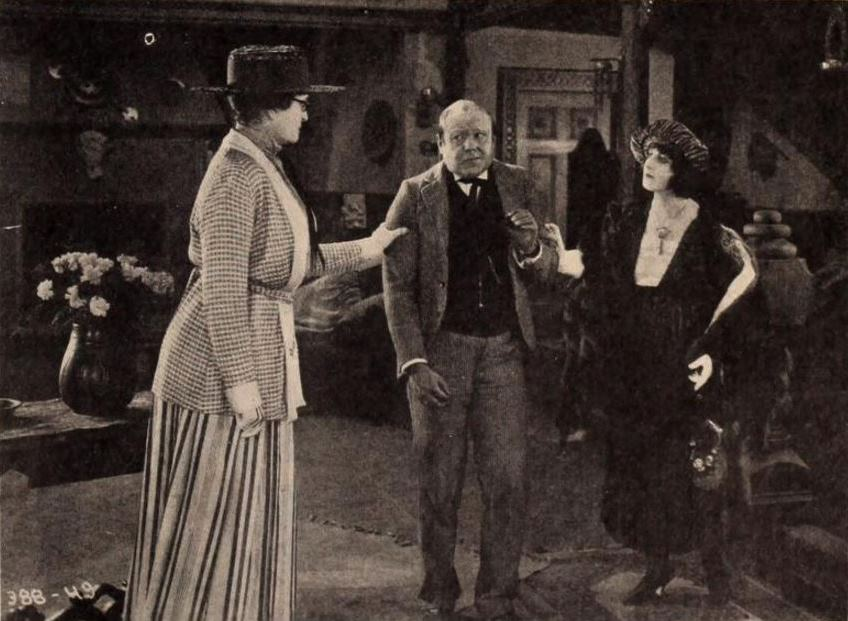
- Margaret Campbell, Harvey Clark, and Margarita Fischer in Their Mutual Child (1920)
- Born: April 24, 1883; St. Louis, Missouri, U.S.
- Died: June 27, 1939 (aged 56); Los Angeles, California, U.S.
- Spouse: Josef Swickard

Margaret Campbell (April 24, 1883 – June 27, 1939) was an American character actress in silent films. In her later years, she was the secretary of the Baháʼí Spiritual Assembly of Los Angeles.

In 1939, Campbell was sexually assaulted and bludgeoned to death with a hammer. Her son, Campbell McDonald, was the initial suspect. He was also suspected of having bludgeoned to death the Russian dancer Anya Sosoyeva and to have assaulted the young actress Delia Bogard, who survived. He was later cleared of those attacks when the actual murderer was captured by the Los Angeles Police Department. Both lethal attacks occurred on the Los Angeles City College campus.

== Career ==
Born in St. Louis, Missouri, Campbell was the leading lady of the Bramhall Players. She appeared on Broadway in Lightnin' (1918), Keeping Up Appearances (1918), The Silent Assertion (1917), Difference in Gods (1917), Keeping Up Appearances (1916), The Merchant of Venice (1913), Hamlet (1912), and Kassa (1909). Later she followed her husband, actor Josef Swickard, into films and was usually cast as rather grand ladies. She retired from the screen at the advent of sound.

=== Death ===
In 1939, Campbell was sexually assaulted and bludgeoned to death with a hammer. Her son, Campbell McDonald, was the initial suspect. He was also suspected of having bludgeoned to death a Russian dancer, Anya Sosoyeva, as well as having assaulted the young actress Delia Bogard, who survived. He was later cleared of those attacks when the actual murderer, DeWitt Clinton Cook, was captured by the Los Angeles police force. Both attacks occurred on the Los Angeles City College campus. Cook had also attacked several other women and was tried, convicted and executed in the San Quentin gas chamber in 1941

== Filmography ==
- The Laundry Girl (1919)
- The Price of Innocence (1919)
- Please Get Married (1919)
- The Notorious Miss Lisle (1920)
- In the Heart of a Fool (1920)
- Lying Lips (1921)
- The Girl in the Taxi (1921)
- Their Mutual Child (1921)
- Eden and Return (1921)
- Don't Shoot (1922)
- Top o' the Morning (1922)
- Confidence (1922)
- Legally Dead (1923)
- The Clean Up (1923)
- His Mystery Girl (1923)
- The Dangerous Blonde (1924)
- The Fast Worker (1924)
- The Home Maker (1925)
- The Lady from Hell (1926)
- Monte Carlo (1926)
- The Better Man (1926)
- Children of Divorce (1927)
- Wages of Conscience (1927)
- One Hysterical Night (1929)
- Take the Heir (1930)

== Stageplay ==
- Kassa (1909)
- Hamlet (1913)
- The Merchant of Venice (1913)
- Keeping Up Appearances (1917)
- Difference in Gods (1917)
- Keeping Up Appearances (1918)
- The Silent Assertion (1918)
- Lightnin' (1921)
