= Herbert Fortier =

Canadian actor (1867–1949)

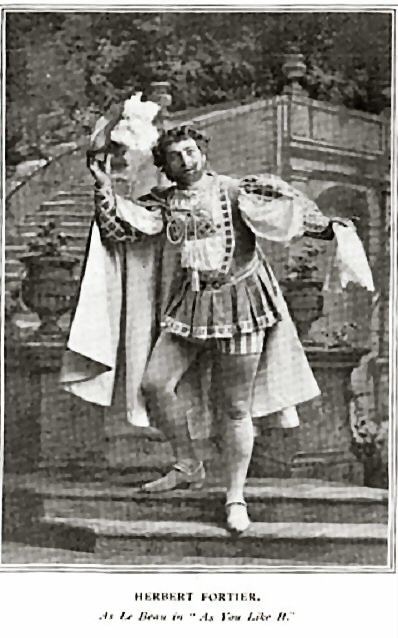
- Herbert Fortier as Le Beau in "As You Like It," ca. 1899
- Born: 1867; Toronto, Ontario, Canada
- Died: 16 February 1949 (aged 81–82); Philadelphia, Pennsylvania, USA
- Occupation: Actor
- Years active: 1915-1937

Herbert Fortier (1867 – 16 February 1949) was a Canadian actor of the silent era. He appeared in more than 50 films between 1915 and 1937. He was born in Toronto and died in Philadelphia, Pennsylvania. In 1913 he lived with his wife Frances in Newfield, New Jersey.

== Partial filmography ==
- The Ringtailed Rhinoceros (1915)
- The City of Failing Light (1916)
- Dollars and the Woman (1916)
- The Gulf Between (1917)
- Who's Your Brother? (1919)
- A Connecticut Yankee in King Arthur's Court (1921)
- Beyond (1921)
- The Shark Master (1921)
- Garments of Truth (1921)
- Midnight (1922)
- The Black Bag (1922)
- Dusk to Dawn (1922)
- Little Wildcat (1922)
- The Eagle's Talons (1923)
- The Clean Up (1923)
- Thundering Dawn (1923)
- Railroaded (1923)
- Slander the Woman (1923)
- Legally Dead (1923)
- Ridgeway of Montana (1924)
- The Whispered Name (1924)
