= The Notorious Miss Lisle =

1920 film directed by James Young

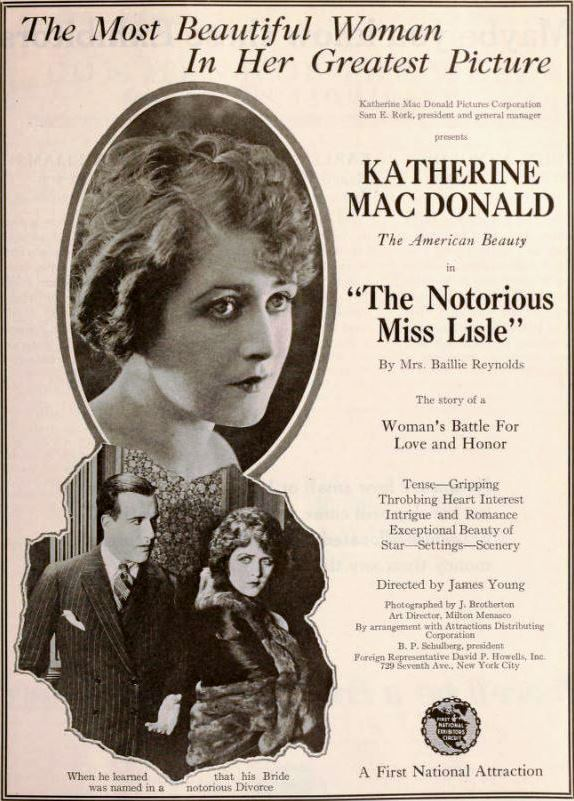
- Directed by: James Young
- Written by: James Young
- Based on: The Notorious Miss Lisle by Baillie Reynolds
- Produced by: Sam E. Rork; Katherine MacDonald
- Starring: Katherine MacDonald; Nigel Barrie; Margaret Campbell
- Cinematography: Joseph Brotherton
- Production company: Katherine MacDonald Pictures
- Distributed by: First National Pictures
- Release date: August 2, 1920
- Running time: 5 reels
- Country: United States
- Language: Silent (English intertitles)

The Notorious Miss Lisle is a 1920 American silent drama film directed by James Young and starring Katherine MacDonald, Nigel Barrie, and Margaret Campbell. The film's sets were designed by the art director Milton Menasco.

== Cast ==
- Katherine MacDonald as Gaenor Lisle
- Nigel Barrie as Peter Garstin
- Margaret Campbell as Mrs. Lisle
- Ernest Joy as Major Lisle
- William Clifford as Craven
- Dorothy Cumming as Mrs. Lyons

== Preservation status ==
- The film is now lost.

== Bibliography ==
- Monaco, James. The Encyclopedia of Film. Perigee Books, 1991.
