= Redheads Preferred =

1926 film

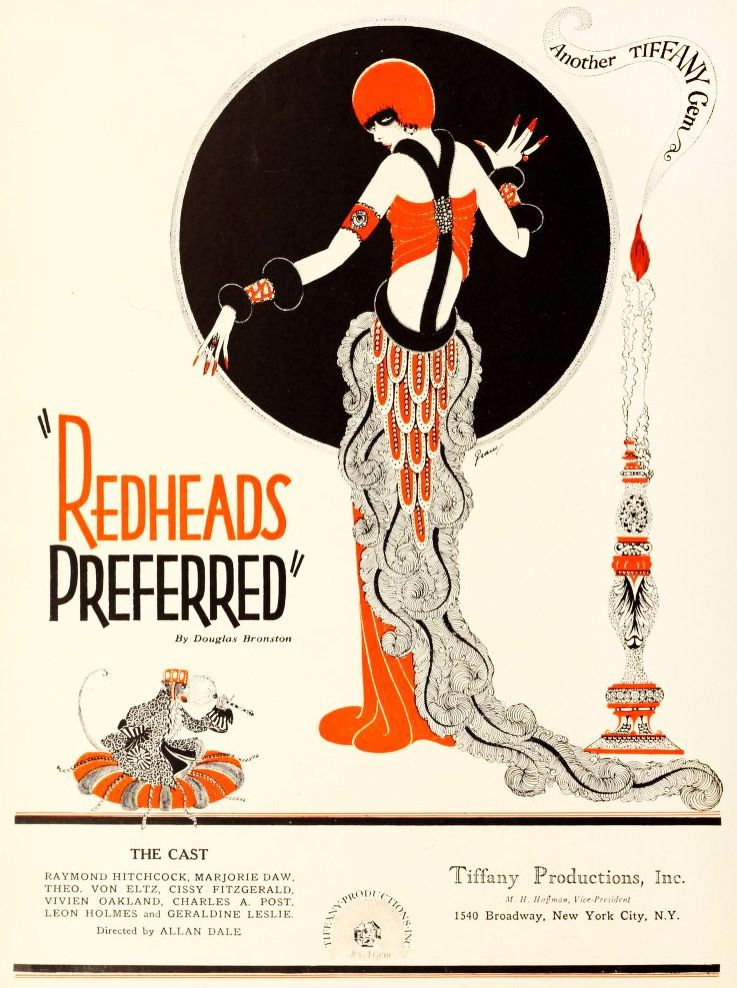
- Directed by: Allen Dale
- Written by: Douglas Bronston
- Starring: Raymond Hitchcock; Marjorie Daw; Theodore von Eltz
- Cinematography: Joseph A. Dubray; Milton Moore
- Edited by: Malcolm Knight
- Production company: Tiffany Pictures
- Distributed by: Tiffany Pictures
- Release date: December 1, 1926
- Running time: 60 minutes
- Country: United States
- Languages: Silent; English intertitles

Redheads Preferred is a 1926 American silent comedy film directed by Allen Dale and starring Raymond Hitchcock, Marjorie Daw and Theodore von Eltz. It was produced by the independent studio Tiffany Pictures. The film's sets were designed by the art director Edwin B. Willis.

== Synopsis ==
In order to secure a business contract, loyal husband John Morgan drinks heavily and agrees to accompany a mysterious red-headed woman to a dance. Discovering what is going on his wife dresses up in a red wig and turns up as his escort for the night. At first very jealous, after a series of misunderstandings she comes to understand her husband's intentions and helps him secure the contract while keeping her identity secret.

== Cast ==
- Raymond Hitchcock as Henry Carter
- Marjorie Daw as Angela Morgan
- Theodore von Eltz as John Morgan
- Cissy Fitzgerald as Mrs. Henry Carter
- Vivien Oakland as Mrs. Bill Williams
- Charles A. Post as Bill Williams
- Leon Holmes as Office Boy
- Geraldine Leslie as Miss Crisp

== Bibliography ==
- Munden, Kenneth White. The American Film Institute Catalog of Motion Pictures Produced in the United States, Part 1. University of California Press, 1997.
- Slide, Anthony. The Encyclopedia of Vaudeville. University Press of Mississippi, 2012.
