= A Village Scandal =

1915 film

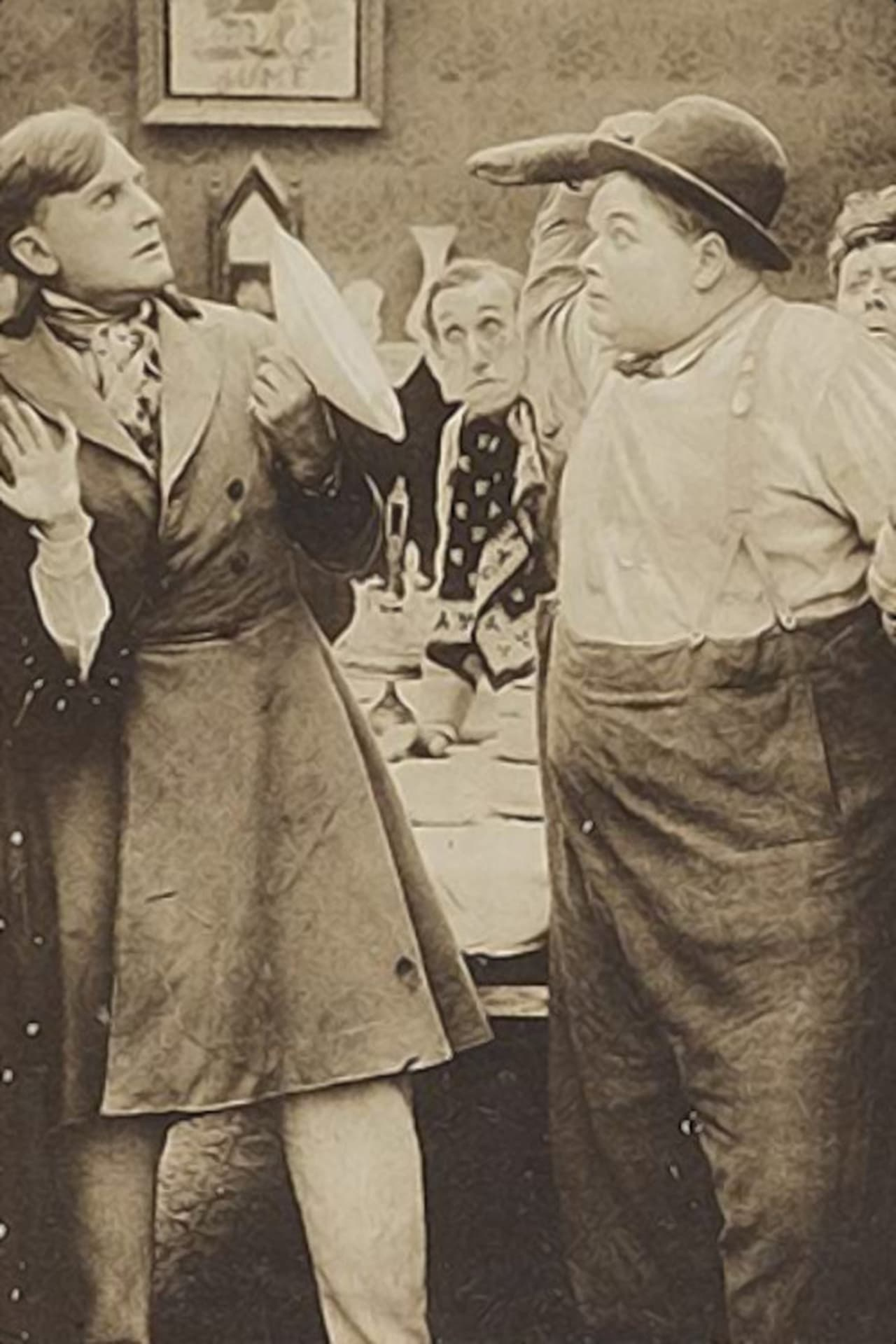
- Directed by: Fatty Arbuckle
- Written by: Mack Sennett
- Starring: Fatty Arbuckle
- Release date: December 12, 1915
- Country: United States
- Languages: Silent; English intertitles

A Village Scandal is a 1915 American short comedy film directed by and starring Fatty Arbuckle.

== Cast ==
- Raymond Hitchcock
- Roscoe "Fatty" Arbuckle as Fatty
- Flora Zabelle
- Al St. John
- Harry McCoy
- Minta Durfee

== See also ==
- Fatty Arbuckle filmography
