= Raymond Hitchcock (actor) =

American silent film actor, stage actor, and stage producer

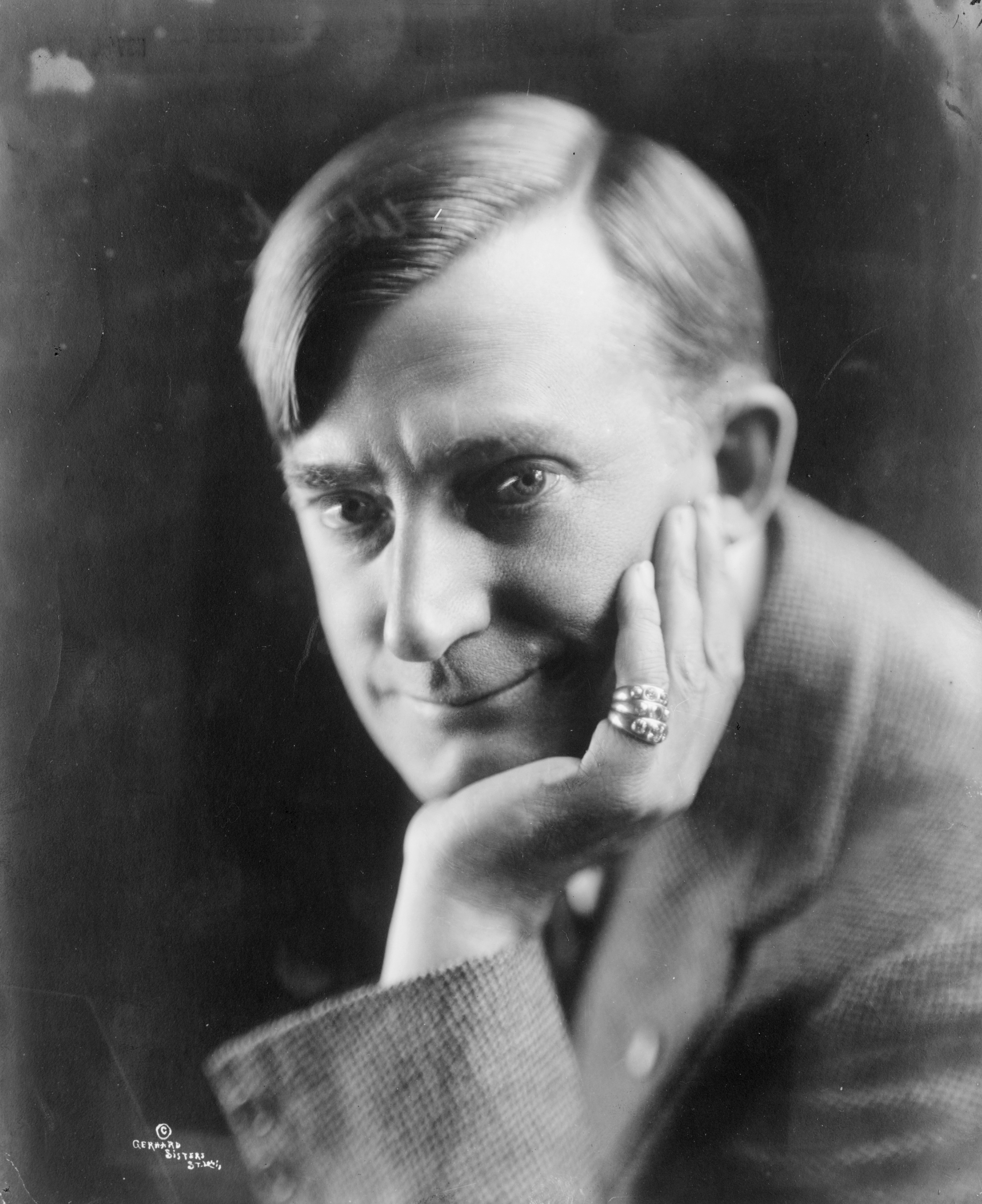
- Born: October 22, 1865; Auburn, New York, U.S.
- Died: November 24, 1929 (aged 64); Beverly Hills, California, U.S.
- Occupations: Actor, producer
- Spouse(s): Freda Cowen (1891-1903); Flora Zabelle (1905-1929; his death

(audio) 1910 phonographic recording of And the World Goes On.

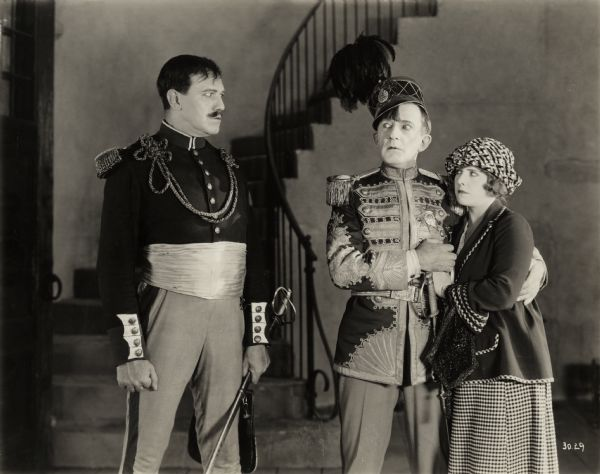
Montagu Love glares at Hitchcock and Diana Allen in the silent comedy The Beauty Shop (1922).

Raymond Hitchcock (October 22, 1865 – November 24, 1929) was an American silent film actor, stage actor, and stage producer, who appeared in or produced 30 plays on Broadway from 1898 to 1928, and who appeared in the silent films of the 1910s and 1920s.

== Biography ==
He first appeared as a star in the character of Abijah Booze in The Yankee Consul, and sang It Was Not Like This in the Olden Time. In his stage career, Hitchcock went back and forth between dramatic roles and ones in comic opera. In 1905 he appeared on Broadway with John Bunny in Easy Dawson, the two apparently playing firemen. Hitchcock also made several phonograph recordings, many of which survive.

In 1907, Hitchcock was charged with the sexual abuse of two adolescent girls together with New York magnate William A. Chanler. As Hitchcock's trial progressed, it was revealed that the charges of sexual abuse were fabricated as part of a blackmail scheme. Hitchcock was acquitted by a jury on June 11, 1908, after spending almost nine months in prison.

He wrote the book to the revue Words and Music (1917).

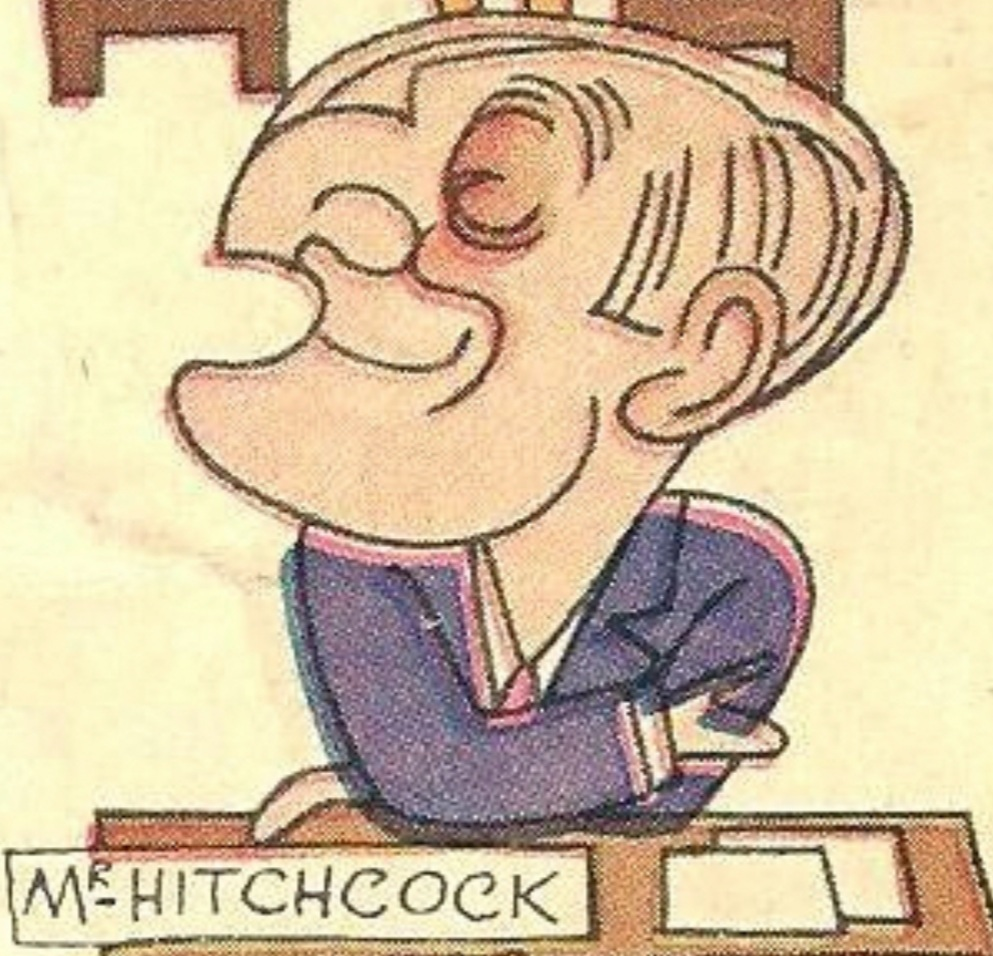
Caricature by Ralph Barton, 1925

In 1925, Hitchcock appeared in a test film made by Lee DeForest in DeForest's Phonofilm sound-on-film process, in which Hitchcock performed a sketch from his Hitchy-Koo revues, which he produced on Broadway in 1917, 1918, 1919, and 1920. Cole Porter wrote the music for the 1919 version. Hitchcock also figured prominently in John Ford's Upstream (1927).

Hitchcock died on November 24, 1929, aged 64, in Beverly Hills, California.

== Personal life ==
Hitchcock was married to Freda Bowen from 1891 to 1903, and then was married to actress Flora Zabelle (1880–1968) from 1905 to his death in 1929. Hitchcock and Zabelle had no children. In one of her few movie roles, Zabelle appeared in the silent film The Red Widow (1916) opposite male lead John Barrymore. Barrymore's role had been played by Hitchcock in the 1911 Broadway production of The Red Widow.

== Partial filmography ==
- The Ringtailed Rhinoceros (1915)
- My Valet (1915)
- A Village Scandal (1915)
- The Wonderful Wager (1916)
- The Red Widow (1916)
- Redheads Preferred (1926)
- Upstream (1927)
- The Monkey Talks (1927)
- The Tired Business Man (1927)
