= 1937 New York Film Critics Circle Awards =

3rd New York Film Critics Circle Awards

3rd New York Film Critics Circle Awards

Announced December 30, 1937
Presented January 9, 1938

Best Picture:
The Life of Émile Zola

The 3rd New York Film Critics Circle Awards, announced on 30 December 1937, presented January 9, 1938, honored the best filmmaking of 1937.

== Winners ==
=== Best Picture ===
- The Life of Emile Zola

=== Best Director ===
- Gregory La Cava – Stage Door

=== Best Actor ===
- Paul Muni – The Life of Emile Zola

=== Best Actress ===
- Greta Garbo – Camille

=== Best Foreign Film ===
- (France) Mayerling
