= Confidence (1922 film) =

1922 film

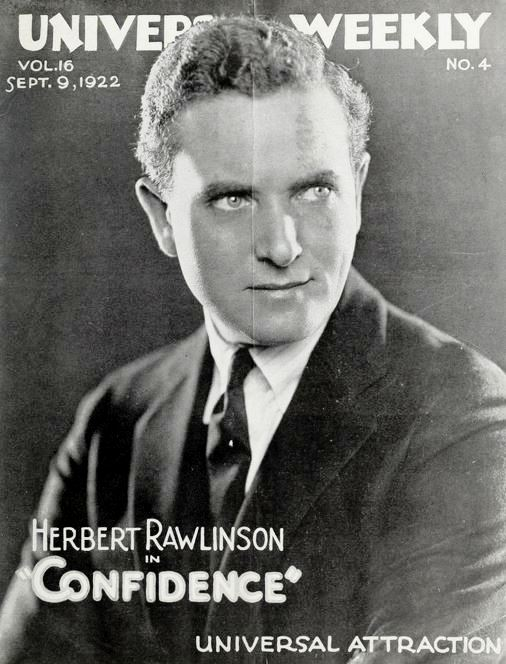
- Directed by: Harry A. Pollard
- Written by: Bernard H. Hyman; Raymond L. Schrock
- Produced by: Carl Laemmle
- Starring: Herbert Rawlinson; Harriet Hammond; Lincoln Plumer
- Cinematography: Howard Oswald
- Production company: Universal Pictures
- Distributed by: Universal Pictures
- Release date: September 25, 1922
- Running time: 50 minutes
- Country: United States
- Languages: Silent; English intertitles

Confidence is a 1922 American silent comedy film directed by Harry A. Pollard and starring Herbert Rawlinson, Harriet Hammond and Lincoln Plumer.

== Cast ==
- Herbert Rawlinson as Bob Mortimer
- Harriet Hammond as Miriam Wiggins
- Lincoln Plumer as Prof. Lang
- William A. Carroll as Homer Waldron
- Otto Hoffman as Josiah Wiggins
- William Robert Daly as Ephraim Bates
- Hallam Cooley as Elmer Tuttle
- John Steppling as Henry Tuttle
- Melbourne MacDowell as J.D. Sprowl
- Gerald Pring as Henry Taylor
- Robert Milasch as Bige Miller
- Margaret Campbell as Mrs. Waldron
- Sam Allen as Const. Kittering

== Bibliography ==
- Connelly, Robert B. The Silents: Silent Feature Films, 1910-36, Volume 40, Issue 2. December Press, 1998.
- Munden, Kenneth White. The American Film Institute Catalog of Motion Pictures Produced in the United States, Part 1. University of California Press, 1997.
