= Wages of Conscience =

1927 film

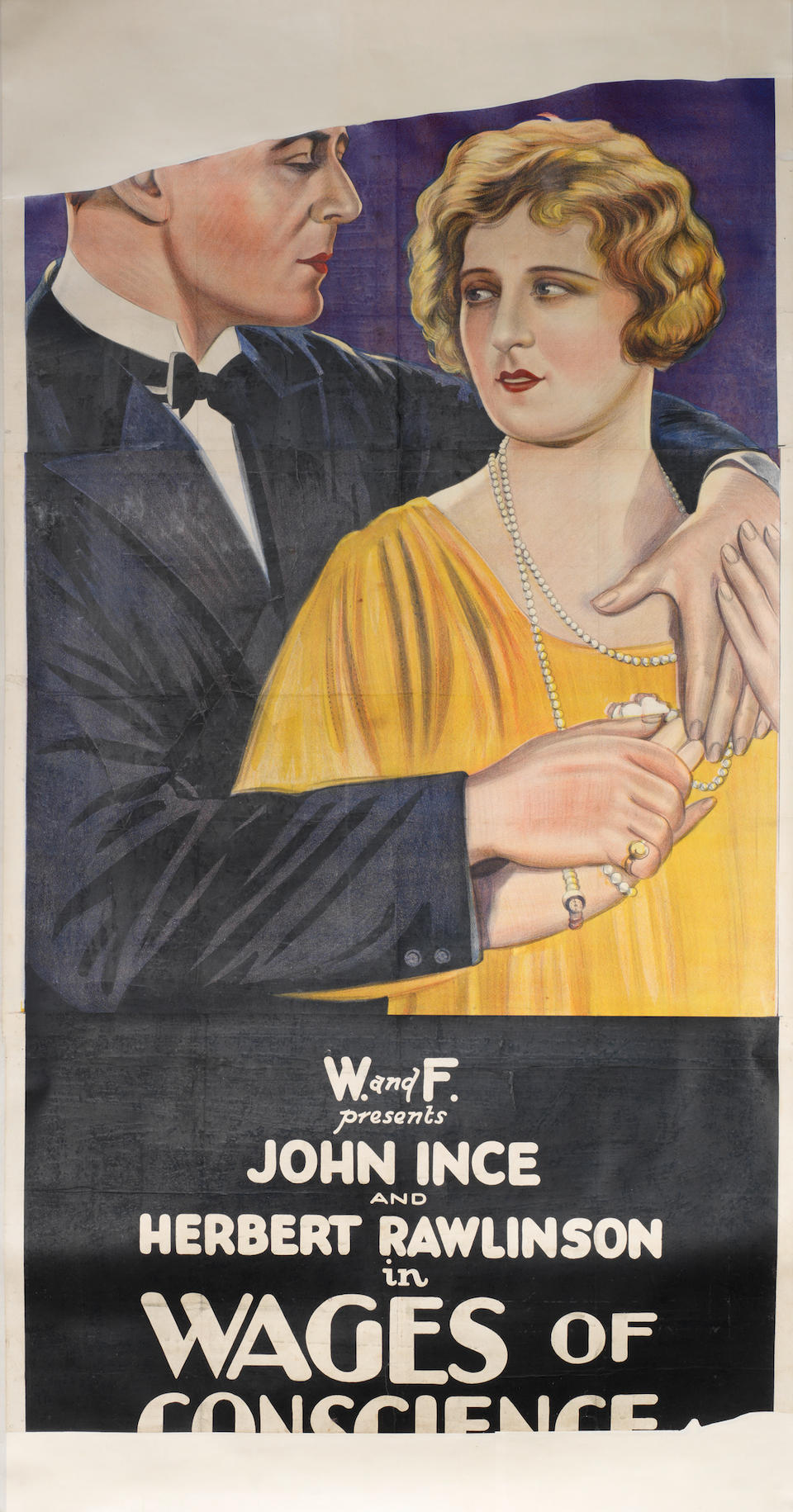
- Directed by: John Ince
- Written by: Mrs. George Hall
- Starring: Herbert Rawlinson; Grace Darmond; Margaret Campbell
- Cinematography: Bert Baldridge
- Production company: Superlative Pictures
- Distributed by: Hi-Mark Film Company
- Release date: December 24, 1927
- Running time: 50 minutes
- Country: United States
- Languages: Silent; English intertitles

Wages of Conscience is a 1927 American silent drama film directed by John Ince and starring Herbert Rawlinson, Grace Darmond and Margaret Campbell.

== Cast ==
- Herbert Rawlinson as Henry McWade
- Grace Darmond as Lillian Bradley / Mary Knowles
- John Ince as Frank Knowles
- Henri La Garde as Dr. Covington
- Margaret Campbell as Lillian's Aunt
- Jasmine as Mifa, the Servant

== Bibliography ==
- Connelly, Robert B. The Silents: Silent Feature Films, 1910-36, Volume 40, Issue 2. December Press, 1998.
- Munden, Kenneth White. The American Film Institute Catalog of Motion Pictures Produced in the United States, Part 1. University of California Press, 1997.
