= Morals for Men =

1925 film

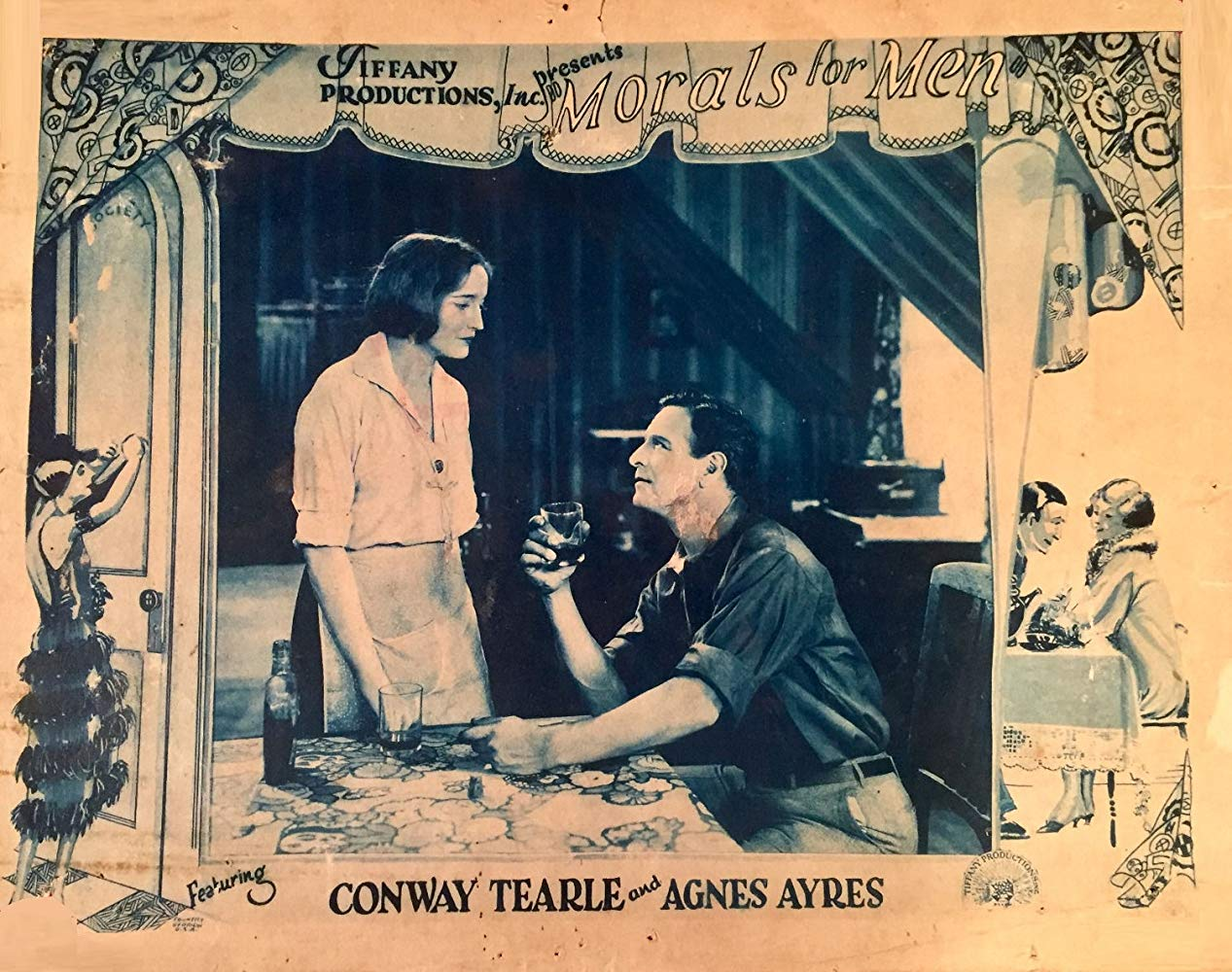
- Lobby card
- Directed by: Bernard H. Hyman
- Written by: Philbin Stoneman; Andrew Percival Younger
- Based on: The Lucky Serum by Gouverneur Morris
- Starring: Conway Tearle; Agnes Ayres; Alyce Mills
- Cinematography: Roland Price
- Edited by: James C. McKay
- Production company: Tiffany Pictures
- Distributed by: Tiffany Pictures
- Release date: November 16, 1925
- Running time: 8 reels
- Country: United States
- Language: Silent (English intertitles)

Morals for Men is a 1925 American silent drama film directed by Bernard H. Hyman and starring Conway Tearle, Agnes Ayres, and Alyce Mills. It is based upon the novel The Lucky Serum by Gouverneur Morris.

== Plot ==
As described in a review in a film magazine, Joe and Bessie, living in defiance of the moral code, have sunk to the depths. Bessie, believing Joe has taken their meagre savings, leaves him and becomes a manicure, finally marrying a wealthy chap who turns out to be stingy and grouchy. Joe saves Marion, a rich girl, from drowning and eventually makes good as a civil engineer and marries her. Eventually Joe and Bessie meet and Joe, in helping her to keep her secret, incurs Marion's jealousy. Bessie is blackmailed by a former acquaintance and, in desperation, decides to tell everything to her husband, but to aid Joe she accuses Wallace, with whom Marion is preparing to go away. Finally, Joe and Marion are reconciled, but Bessie learns that the world never forgives a woman who sins even when she has reformed, and she decides to end it all.

== Cast ==
- Conway Tearle as Joe Strickland
- Agnes Ayres as Bessie Hayes
- Alyce Mills as Marion Winslow
- Otto Matieson as Frank Bowman
- Robert Ober as Harvey Larkin
- John Miljan as Leonard Wallace
- Mary Beth Milford as Mary
- Eve Southern as Mrs. Strickland
- Marjery O'Neill

== Preservation ==
A complete print of Morals for Men is in the collection of the Library of Congress.

== Bibliography ==
- Robert B. Connelly. The Silents: Silent Feature Films, 1910-36, Volume 40, Issue 2. December Press, 1998.
