= Flora Zabelle Hitchcock =

American actress (1880–1968)

Flora Zabelle
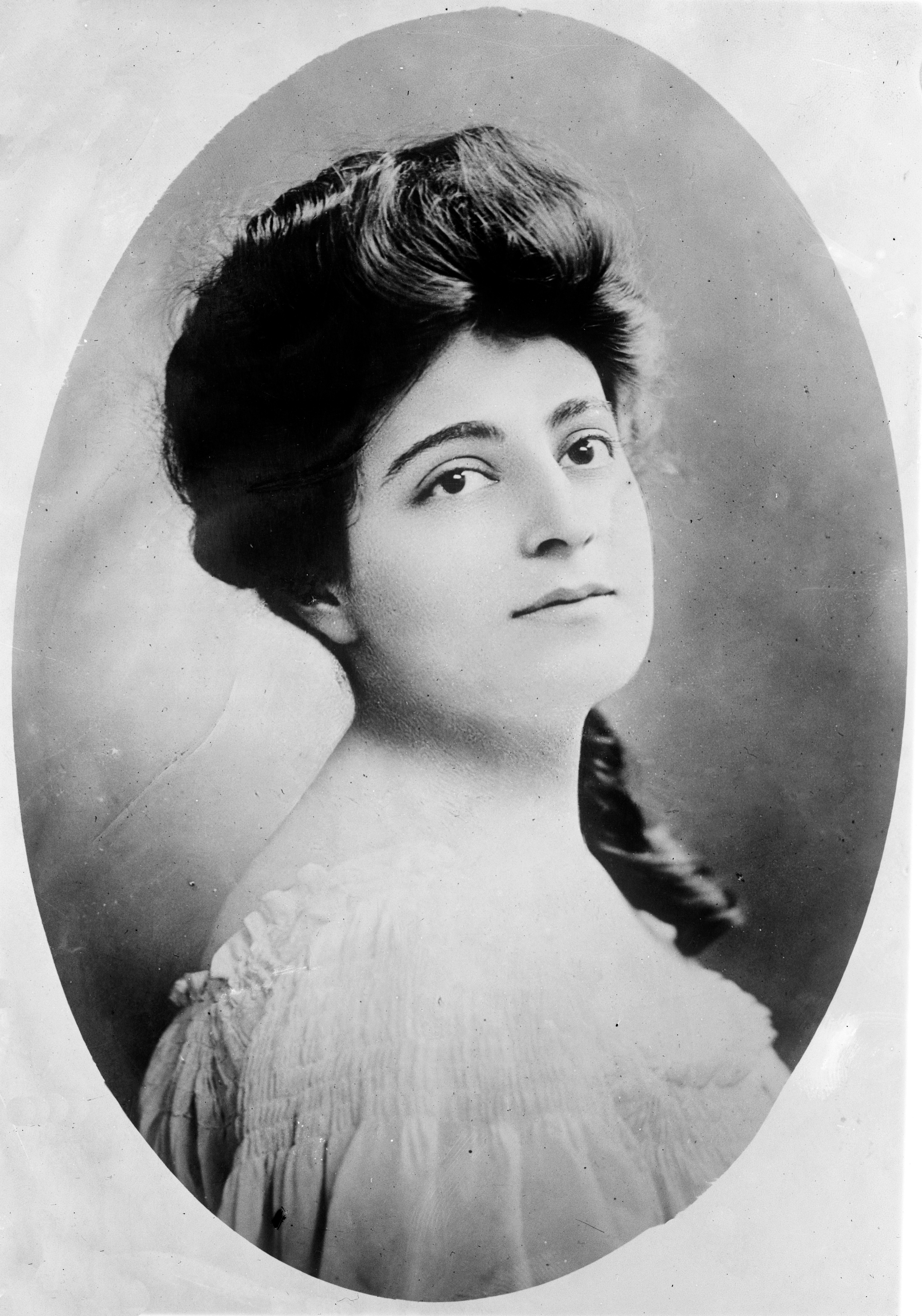
- Born: Zabelle Mangasarian; April 1, 1880; Istanbul, Turkey, Ottoman Empire
- Died: October 7, 1968; New York City, U.S.
- Occupation: Actress
- Spouse(s): Raymond Hitchcock (m. 1905-1929; his death)

Flora Zabelle (born Zabelle Mangasarian, April 1, 1880 – October 7, 1968) was a Broadway actress who appeared in several early silent films.

== Early years ==
Zabelle was born in Constantinople, Ottoman Empire (now Istanbul, Turkey). Of Armenian descent, Flora Zabelle was born in the Ottoman Empire to Dr. M. M. Mangasarian. At the time of the Hamidian massacres, Dr. Mangasarian along with Flora moved to the United States. Her sister, Christine Mangasarian, was also an actress.

== Career ==
In her Broadway debut in 1900, Zabelle portrayed Poppy in San Toy. In 1902, she appeared in the film King Dodo.

In 1920, she retired from the stage. About a decade later, she joined Jacques Bodart, Inc. as a designer and partner. In 1931, she left retirement to portray Mrs. Van Allen in the Broadway play The Man on Stilts.

== Personal life ==
She was married to Raymond Hitchcock from 1905 to his death in 1929. On October 7, 1968, she died in Presbyterian Hospital in New York City.

== Selected filmography ==
- A Village Scandal (1915)
- The Ringtailed Rhinoceros (1915)
- The Red Widow (1916)
- A Perfect 36 (1918)
