= Don't Shoot (film) =

1922 film

- Directed by: Jack Conway
- Written by: George Hively; George Bronson Howard
- Produced by: Carl Laemmle
- Starring: Herbert Rawlinson; Edna Murphy; Harvey Clark
- Cinematography: Virgil Miller
- Production company: Universal Pictures
- Distributed by: Universal Pictures
- Release date: August 21, 1922
- Country: United States
- Languages: Silent; English intertitles

Don't Shoot is a 1922 American silent crime film directed by Jack Conway and starring Herbert Rawlinson, Edna Murphy and Harvey Clark.

== Cast ==
- Herbert Rawlinson as James Harrington Court
- William Dyer as Boss McGinnis
- Harvey Clark as Honest John Lysaght
- Wade Boteler as Buck Lindsay
- Margaret Campbell as Mrs. Van Deek
- Edna Murphy as Velma Gay
- George Fisher as Archie Craig
- Tiny Sandford as Jim
- Duke R. Lee as Pete
- Gerard Alexander as Mrs. Ransom
- Fred Kelsey as Police Officer
- L.J. O'Connor as Larry the Dip

== Bibliography ==
- Langman, Larry. American Film Cycles: The Silent Era. Greenwood Publishing, 1998.
