= His Mystery Girl =

1923 film

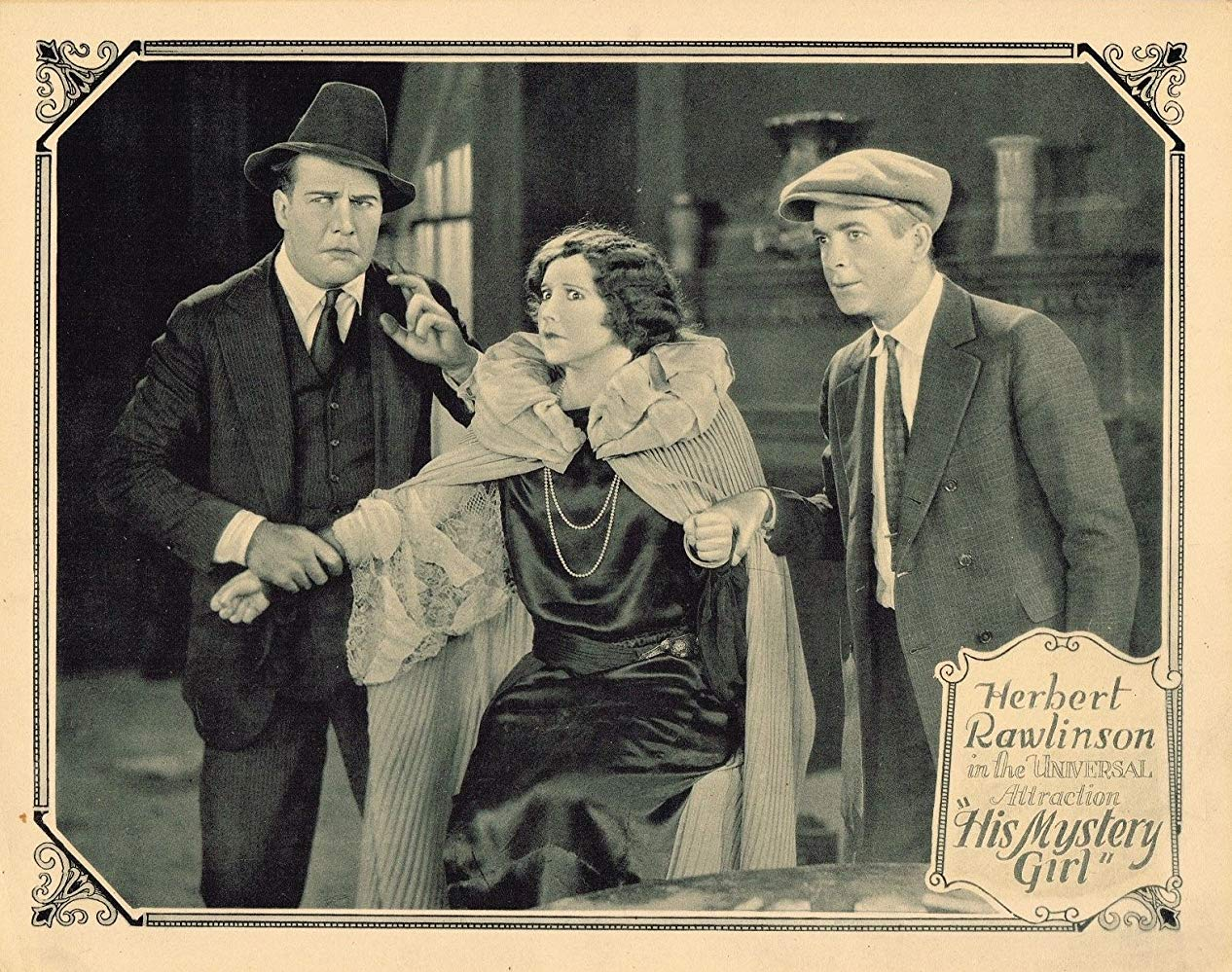
- Lobby card
- Directed by: Robert F. Hill
- Written by: William E. Wing
- Story by: Marion Orth
- Produced by: Carl Laemmle
- Starring: Herbert Rawlinson; Ruth Dwyer; Margaret Campbell
- Cinematography: William Thornley
- Production company: Universal Pictures
- Distributed by: Universal Pictures
- Release date: December 5, 1923
- Running time: 5 reels
- Country: United States
- Language: Silent (English intertitles)

His Mystery Girl is a 1923 American silent comedy film directed by Robert F. Hill and starring Herbert Rawlinson, Ruth Dwyer, and Margaret Campbell.

== Plot ==
As described in a film magazine, the friends of Kerry Reynolds (Rawlinson) think he should be a more human young man and scare him into going to his doctor. The doctor, who is in on the joke, tells him that he is a very sick man. Leaving the doctor's office he sees a beautiful young woman apparently in distress and she wins his heart. Seeing her again at a hotel lobby, he notes that she drops a beaded handbag and takes it home. Seeing her advertisement about her handbag, he meets her and finds that the handbag contains valuable diamonds. Rushing to his apartment to check the bag's contents, he finds that it is gone. Then the woman appears at his door and demands the bag, and she is followed by a man claiming to be her husband. Kerry gets a message that she is a prisoner in a deserted house, and after some adventures he arrives to save her, and gets into a tremendous fight with a band of men who might be her kidnappers. He escapes with her and is chased by policemen on motorcycles. Finally, when he takes her from her home to the Justice of Police where he hopes to marry her, his friends tumble out and tell him that it has been a great practical joke on their part, and that the young woman is a student from a drama they hired to lead him into some adventures, and that the main villain is her brother. At the end there is a reconciliation and Kerry finding love.

== Cast ==
- Herbert Rawlinson as Kerry Reynolds
- Ruth Dwyer as Gloria Bliss
- Margaret Campbell as Laurette Sligsby
- Jere Austin as Benn Bliss
- Ralph McCullough as Dick Reynolds
- William Quinn as The Valet
- Kasha Haroldi (uncredited)

== Preservation ==
A copy of His Mystery Girl is held in the George Eastman Museum Motion Picture Collection.

== Bibliography ==
- Munden, Kenneth White. The American Film Institute Catalog of Motion Pictures Produced in the United States, Part 1. University of California Press, 1997.
