= Legally Dead =

1923 film

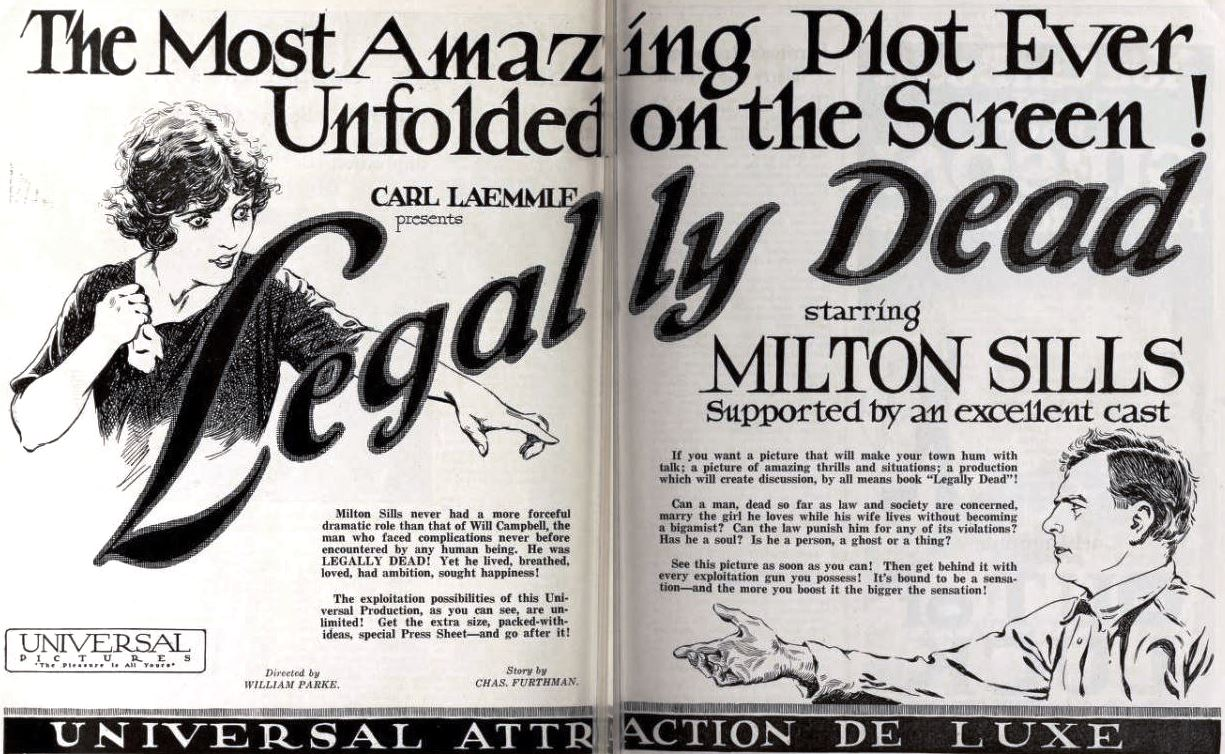
- Advertisement
- Directed by: William Parke
- Screenplay by: Harvey Gates
- Story by: Charles Furthman
- Starring: Milton Sills; Margaret Campbell; Claire Adams; Eddie Sturgis; Faye O'Neill; Charles A. Stevenson
- Cinematography: Richard Fryer
- Production company: Universal Pictures
- Distributed by: Universal Pictures
- Release date: July 30, 1923
- Running time: 60 minutes
- Country: United States
- Language: Silent (English intertitles)

Legally Dead is a 1923 American drama film directed by William Parke and written by Harvey Gates. The film stars Milton Sills, Margaret Campbell, Claire Adams, Eddie Sturgis, Faye O'Neill, and Charles A. Stevenson. The film was released on July 30, 1923, by Universal Pictures.

== Plot ==
A reporter, Will Campbell, gets himself arrested to get material for a story. He later gets a job as a bank teller but is hounded by a detective who knows Campbell is an ex-con. The detective is found murdered and Campbell is sentenced to death for the crime. He is hanged just before he is found innocent but a doctor revives him by giving him a shot of adrenaline.

== Cast ==
- Milton Sills as Will Campbell
- Margaret Campbell as Mrs. Mazie Campbell
- Claire Adams as Minnie O'Reilly
- Eddie Sturgis as Jake Dorr
- Faye O'Neill as Jake's Sweetheart
- Charles A. Stevenson as Malcolm Steel
- Joseph W. Girard as District Attorney
- Albert Prisco as The Anarchist
- Herbert Fortier as The Judge
- Charles Wellesley as The Governor
- Robert Homans as Detective Powell
- Brandon Hurst as Dr. Gelzer

== Preservation ==
With no prints of Legally Dead located in any film archives, it is a lost film.
