= Camille (1936 film) =

1936 film by George Cukor

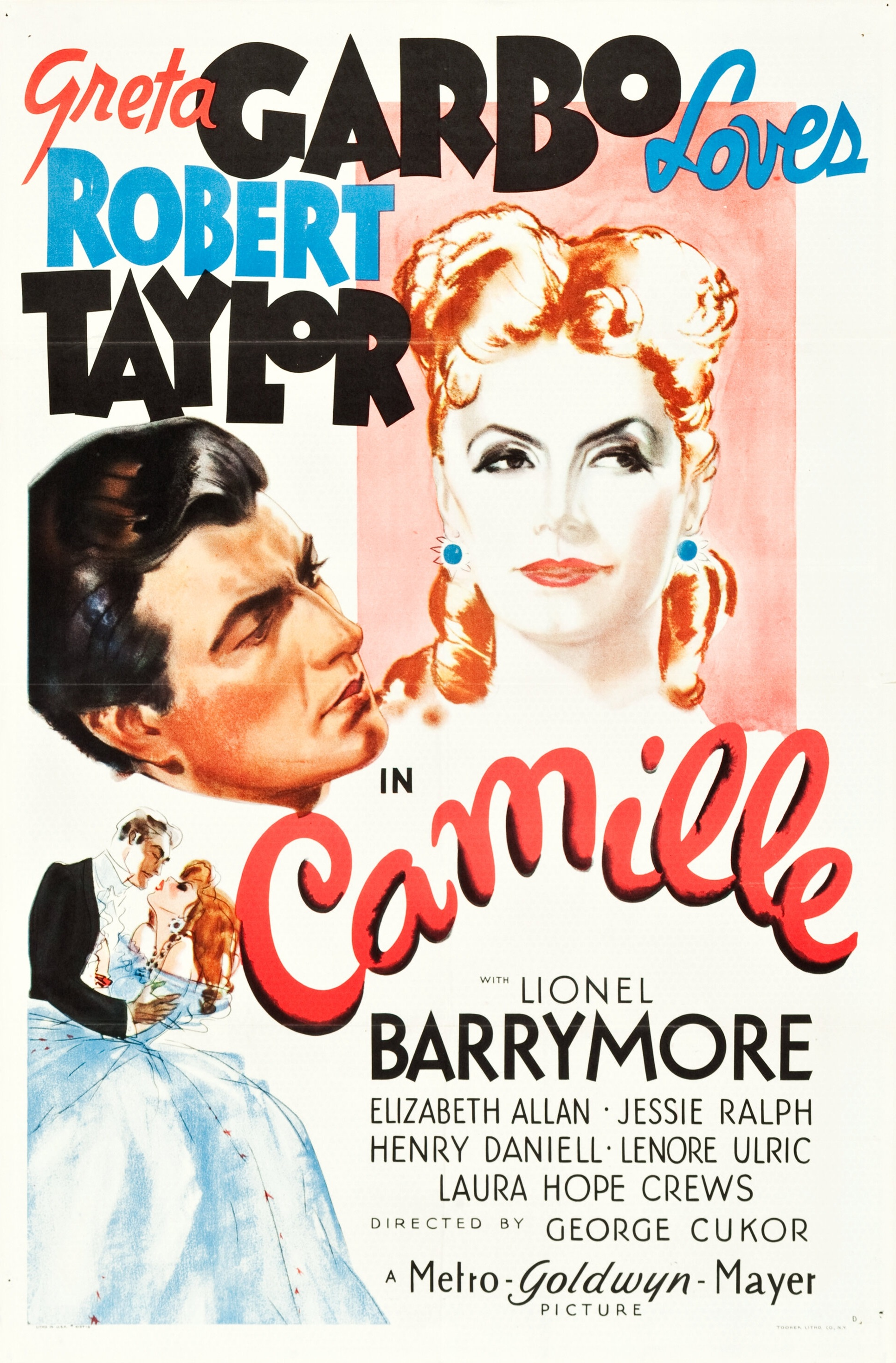
- Theatrical Poster
- Directed by: George Cukor
- Written by: James Hilton; Zoë Akins; Frances Marion
- Based on: La Dame aux Camélias; 1852 novel by Alexandre Dumas, fils
- Produced by: Irving Thalberg; Bernard H. Hyman
- Starring: Greta Garbo; Robert Taylor; Lionel Barrymore
- Cinematography: William H. Daniels; Karl Freund
- Edited by: Margaret Booth
- Music by: Herbert Stothart; Edward Ward
- Production company: Metro-Goldwyn-Mayer
- Distributed by: Loew's Inc.
- Release date: December 12, 1936
- Running time: 109 minutes
- Country: United States
- Language: English
- Budget: $1,486,000
- Box office: $2,842,000

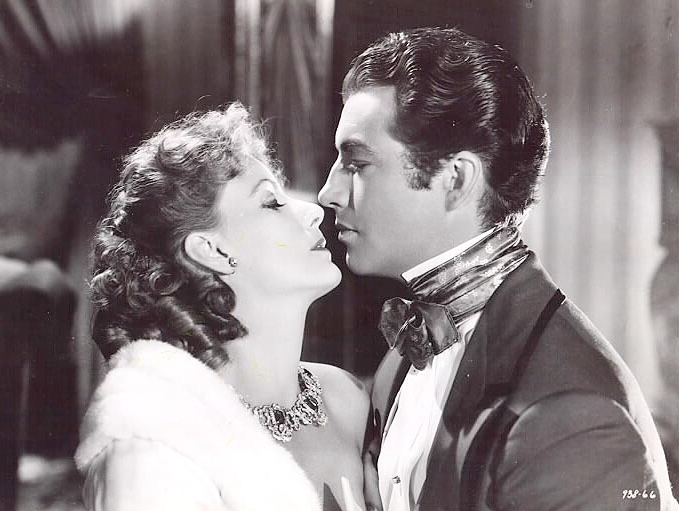
Greta Garbo and Robert Taylor

Camille is a 1936 American romantic tragedy film from Metro-Goldwyn-Mayer directed by George Cukor, and produced by Irving Thalberg and Bernard H. Hyman, from a screenplay by James Hilton, Zoë Akins, and Frances Marion. The picture is based on the 1848 novel and 1852 play La dame aux camélias by Alexandre Dumas, fils. The film stars Greta Garbo, Robert Taylor, Lionel Barrymore, Elizabeth Allan, Jessie Ralph, Henry Daniell, and Laura Hope Crews. It grossed $2,842,000.

Camille was included in Time magazine's "All-Time 100 Movies" in 2005. It was also included at #33 in AFI's 100 Years...100 Passions. Garbo received her third Best Actress nomination for Camille at the 10th Academy Awards in 1938.

== Plot ==
Beautiful Marguerite Gautier is a well-known courtesan, living in the demi-monde of mid-19th century Paris. Marguerite's dressmaker and procuress, Prudence Duvernoy, arranges an assignation at the theatre with a fabulously wealthy prospective patron, the Baron de Varville. Marguerite briefly mistakes Armand Duval, a handsome young man of good family but no great fortune, for the baron. She finds Armand charming, but when the mistake is explained, she accepts the baron without hesitation.

Marguerite spends money carelessly, sometimes out of generosity, as when she bids a fortune on a team of horses in order to give an old coachman employment, but more often because she loves her lavish lifestyle and the late nights of dancing and drinking—and because she knows her days are numbered. She has consumption, which is a death sentence for anyone who lives as she does. She has bouts of severe illness, and during one spell, the only person who comes to see her is Armand, bearing flowers (the baron contriving to be in England). She finds this out after she recovers, and she invites him to her birthday party (the baron having just departed for a long stay in Russia). During the party, Marguerite retreats into the bedroom with a coughing spell, and Armand follows. He professes his love for her, which is something she has never known. She gives him a key and tells him to send everyone home and come back later. While she is waiting for him, the baron returns unexpectedly. She orders Nanine, her maid, to shoot the bolt on the door. The baron, who is clearly suspicious, plays the piano furiously, not quite masking the bell. He asks who might be at the door and, laughing, she says, "The great romance of my life—That might have been."

At Armand's family home in the country, he asks his father for money to travel to prepare for his career in the Foreign Service. He sends Marguerite a scathing letter (he saw the baron's carriage), but when she comes to his rooms, they reconcile immediately. She sees a miniature of his mother and is amazed to learn that his parents have loved each other for 30 years. "You'll never love me 30 years," she says, sadly. "I'll love you all my life," he replies. He wants to take her to the country for the summer to get well. She tells him to forget her, but agrees in the end. However, she owes 40,000 francs. The baron gives her the money as a parting gift, and slaps her in the face when she kisses him in thanks.

Armand takes her to a house in the country, where Marguerite thrives on fresh milk and eggs and country walks and love. A shadow is cast by the discovery that the baron's château is in the neighborhood. Marguerite tells him she has asked Prudence to sell everything, pay everything. Armand asks her to marry him, but she declines.

Armand's father, though he acknowledges Marguerite's love is real, begs her to turn away from his son, knowing her past will ruin his chances. When Armand returns to the house, she is cold and dismissive and tells him the baron is expecting her. He watches her walk over the hill.

Back in Paris, at a gambling club, Armand comes face to face with the baron and Marguerite, who is ill. Armand wins a fortune from the baron at baccarat and begs Marguerite to come with him. She lies and says she loves the baron. Armand wounds the baron in a duel and must leave the country for six months. When he returns, Marguerite's illness has worsened. "Perhaps it's better if I live in your heart, where the world can't see me," she says and then dies in his arms.

== Cast ==
- Greta Garbo as Marguerite Gautier
- Robert Taylor as Armand Duval
- Lionel Barrymore as Monsieur Duval
- Elizabeth Allan as Nichette, the bride
- Jessie Ralph as Nanine, Marguerite's maid
- Henry Daniell as Baron de Varville
- Lenore Ulric as Olympe
- Laura Hope Crews as Prudence Duvernoy
- Rex O'Malley as Gaston
- Mabel Colcord as Madame Barjon (uncredited)
- Mariska Aldrich as friend of Marguerite (uncredited)
- Wilson Benge as attendant (uncredited)

== Production ==
=== Development ===
The play had previously been adaptated for film in 1912, 1915 and 1917, in 1921 with Nazimova and Rudolph Valentino, and in 1926 with Norma Talmadge.

Irving Thalberg assigned Davis Lewis to work on the film as associate producer. According to Lewis, Greta Garbo only agreed to make the movie if MGM would finance Conquest.

Francis Marion wrote the first draft of the script with James Hilton; according to Lewis, Marion had a crush on Hilton and the first draft "was ludicrous—flowery, overblown, and just downright badly conceived and overwritten. It was almost comic opera." The director, George Cukor, suggested Zoe Akins be brought in to work on the script.

According to a news item in Daily Variety, MGM had considered changing the setting of the famous Alexandre Dumas story to modern times. The time period was not changed, but Thalberg wanted the film to have a more contemporary feeling than earlier Camilles. He wanted audiences to forget that they were watching a "costume" picture. He also felt that morality had changed since the earlier Camilles, and the fact that Marguerite was a prostitute was not as shameful anymore; as a result, Garbo's character became more likable than in previous productions. The modernization of the story proved to be successful.

=== Shooting ===
While filming Marguerite's death scene, Robert Taylor brought his phonograph to Garbo's dressing room so that she could play Paul Robeson records to put her in the mood.

In the words of Camille's director George Cukor: "My mother had just died, and I had been there during her last conscious moments. I suppose I had a special awareness. I may have passed something on to Garbo without realizing it." Garbo later praised Cukor's sensitivity: "Cukor gave me direction as to how to hold my hands", said Garbo. "He had seen how, when his mother lay dying, she folded her hands and just fell asleep."

While producing Camille, producer Irving Thalberg died. After filming was ended, and post-production began, Louis B. Mayer assigned Bernard Hyman as the film's new producer. Hyman arranged re-takes, cut some scenes, or edited scenes from the original Thalberg production. It is not exactly known which scenes were edited or cut.

The famous death scene in the film as released is not the original version that was shot. Initially, Camille died on the bed, had more words to say, and folded her hands before she died; this original death scene is lost. Cukor thought the amount of dialogue was unrealistic for a dying character, so Garbo's last scene was rewritten and reshot three times; each successive version had fewer words, until in the final version Camille just slowly slipped away in Armand's arms.

News items in Daily Variety and Hollywood Reporter on July 25, 1936, noted that John Barrymore originally was cast in the role of Baron de Varville, but a bout of pneumonia prevented him from working on the picture. Barrymore's brother Lionel was scheduled to replace John in the role; however, a few days later, it was reported that a change in casting resulted in Lionel Barrymore's assignment to the role of Monsieur Duval, and Henry Daniell's assignment to Baron de Varville. Cinematographer William Daniels mistakenly is listed as a cast member in early Hollywood Reporter production charts. Camille marked the screen debut of actress Joan Leslie, who appeared under her real name, Joan Brodel.

== Reception ==
=== Promotion ===
The "Selling Angles" section in BoxOffice Magazine, Dec. 26, 1936, suggested tips for selling Camille. Theatre managers were advised to make a display of some of the famous Camilles of past decades, including Garbo as the latest to join the list of immortal actresses; have local florists stage a "Camille Show"; find old reviews from metropolitan daily papers' back files and run them in conjunction with reviews of the modern film story; and print throwaways in the style of the old "Gas Light Era" programs. The suggested best "Catchlines" for selling Camille, according to BoxOffice, were:

- "Her love was like a great flame...burning...scorching...withering...and when the flame died, she no longer cared to live."
- "Her destiny was to be loved...but not to love...until she met the man who was to change that destiny."
- "Again...Dumas' classic love tale...with the screen's most dramatic love team – Garbo and Taylor."

=== Premiere ===
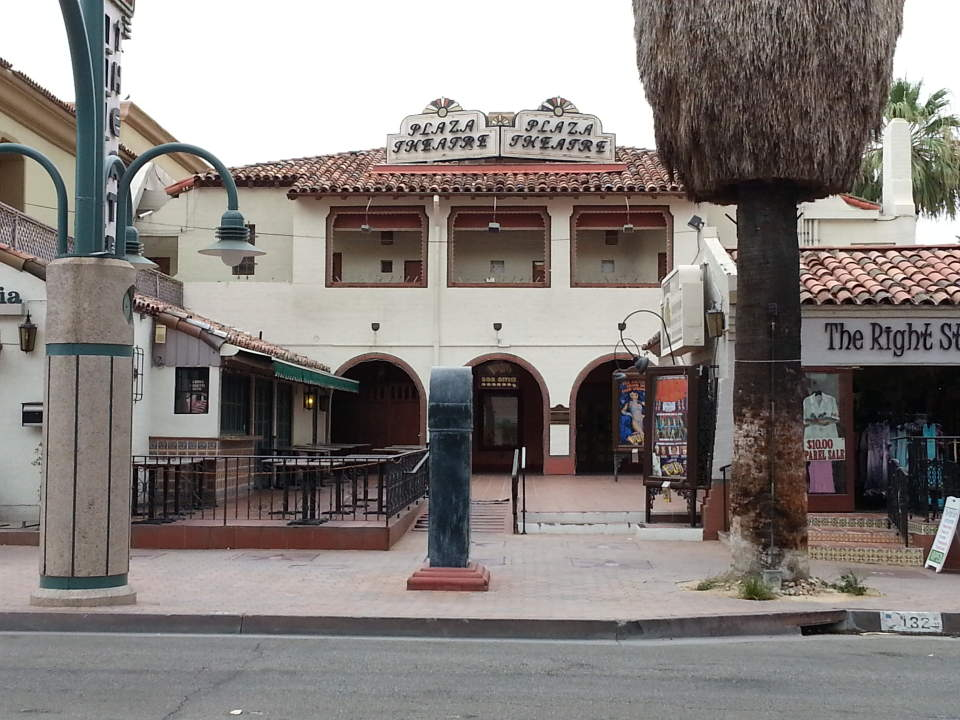
Plaza Theatre in Palm Springs

Camille had its grand world premiere on December 12, 1936, at the new Plaza Theatre in Palm Springs, California. Many celebrities attended the gala which cost $10 per seat. The desert resort of Palm Springs was turned upside down with all the commotion of the film's premiere. Some of the film was buried in stone to commemorate the celebration. Ralph Bellamy, who was a leading civic figure and Racquet Club owner in Palm Springs, was master of ceremonies. Rumors were spread that Greta Garbo was staying at the desert resort and would attend the premiere, but these rumors proved to be unfounded.

At the gala premiere, Camille was given an enthusiastic reception; the critics praised it as the finest performance ever given by Greta Garbo, Robert Taylor, Lionel Barrymore, and Laura Hope Crews, and the best work by director George Cukor. The enthusiasm accorded the picture was seen as a tribute to the genius of the late Irving G. Thalberg, who conceived of, and was responsible for, the production. The 37-year-old Thalberg died just before the film's release.

=== Box office ===
According to MGM records, the film earned $1,154,000 in the U.S. and Canada, and $1,688,000 in other markets, resulting in a profit of $388,000.

=== Critical response ===
Camille has been well received by critics since its release, and the role of Marguerite is generally regarded as Greta Garbo's finest screen performance. Camille is often named as a highlight among 1936 films. Rotten Tomatoes reports 96% approval among 76 critics with the consensus: "Greta Garbo breathes life into this familiar story and reinvigorates audiences with this new version of Camille while writer Zoe Akins and director George Cukor mine the Dumas classic for all its romantic, Paris-set gold."

On watching a scene in the film where Garbo is at a theater, Thalberg said: "George, she's awfully good. I don't think I've ever seen her so good." "But Irving", said Cukor, "she's just sitting in an Opera Box." "She's relaxed", said Thalberg. "She's open. She seems unguarded for once." Garbo's new attitude prompted Thalberg to have the script reworked. "She is a fascinating artist, but she is limited", Thalberg told the new writers. "She must never create situations. She must be thrust into them. The drama comes in how she rides them out."

Robert Taylor was well received for his performance, with the reviewer for Modern Screen noting that he gave "probably his first serious performance for the screen ... his fine performance will come as a surprise to those who heretofore regarded him as nothing more than a Glamor Boy."

== Awards ==
Award	Category	Nominee(s)	Result
10th Academy Awards	Best Actress	Greta Garbo	Nominated
1937 New York Film Critics Circle Awards	Best Actress	Greta Garbo	Won

== See also ==
- Lionel Barrymore filmography

== Notes ==
- Lewis, David (1993). Curtis, James (ed.). The Creative Producer. Metuchen: Scarecrow Press. ISBN 0-8108-2720-4.
