= The Ringtailed Rhinoceros =

1915 film by George Terwilliger

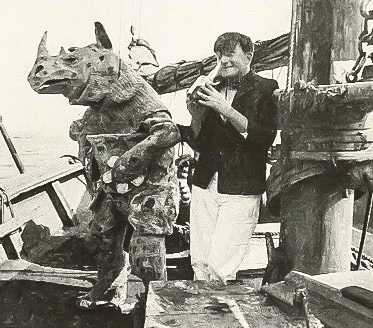
- John Carter-Carter (Raymond Hitchcock) drinking rum aboard the pirate ship
- Directed by: George W. Terwilliger
- Screenplay by: Lawrence S. McCloskey ("scenarist")
- Produced by: Siegmund Lubin
- Starring: Raymond Hitchcock; Flora Zabelle
- Production company: Lubin Manufacturing Company
- Distributed by: V-L-S-E, Incorporated
- Release date: August 16, 1915
- Running time: 4 reels (approximately 50 minutes) (Note: According to How Movies Work by Bruce F. Kawin (Berkeley: University of California Press, 1987), a standard 1000-foot theatrical reel of film in the silent era was projected at a speed of 16 frames per second, considerably slower than the 24 frames in the sound era. A full silent reel therefore had an average running time a bit less than 15 minutes.)
- Country: United States
- Language: Silent (English intertitles)

The Ringtailed Rhinoceros (also cited The Ring-Tailed Rhinoceros) is a lost 1915 American silent comedy-drama film that depicted the ruinous effects of alcohol on a good-natured man and on the lives of the people around him. Like snakes and "pink elephants" that have been used in many societies to symbolize heavy drinking or been associated with the hallucinations of drunkards, the main character in this "'photophantasy'" blamed instead a "Ringtailed Rhinoceros" for his excessive use of wine and liquor. (Note: As documented on Wikipedia's page "Seeing pink elephants", use of that euphemism for excessive drinking can be found in print in the United States by the late 1800s, although the exact origin of the colorful phrase remains undetermined.)

The production's screenplay, written by Lawrence McCloskey, consisted basically of two parts: the first being a depiction of real-life events in an alcoholic's life and the latter part being a presentation of his bizarre dream in which he wandered through a land of strange people and animals to find and kill the evil rhino. Directed by George Terwilliger and starring Raymond Hitchcock and Flora Zabelle, this Lubin production was filmed on location in Long Island, New York and St. Augustine, Florida.

The Library of Congress includes the film among the National Film Preservation Board's list of "7,200 Lost U.S. Silent Feature Films" produced between 1912 and 1929.

== Plot ==
News items about the film in 1914 and reviews in 1915 provide descriptions of its storyline and cast. The plot's main character, John Carter-Carter (Raymond Hitchcock), is portrayed as a pleasant man who drinks alcohol excessively. His frequent drinking often causes him to ignore or forget his day-to-day responsibilities, much to the regret of his fiancée, Marybelle Loring (Flora Zabelle), who pleads with him to stop boozing. When her little brother Billie (Raymond Hackett) asks John why his sister is so sad, the man blames the "Ringtailed Rhinoceros". The boy is confused by that answer, but he vows to kill the beast. Soon, though, the rhino leads John once again to alcohol and this time to the destruction of his wedding plans. Intoxicated, John arrives late to a lawn party where he and Marybelle were to announce their betrothal. The invited guests have departed; Marybelle is humiliated; and her furious parents (Herbert Fortier and Ida Waterman) cancel the engagement.

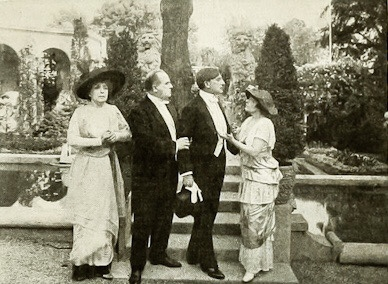
John arrives drunk and late for his engagement party; (actors from left): Ida Waterman, Herbert Fortier, Hitchcock, and Flora Zabelle

John's break-up with Marybelle devastates him. Returning to his rented room, he finds little Billie waiting there, still eager to hunt and kill the rhino. John assures the boy that together they will slay him, so they begin planning how to do it. Before long, Billie falls asleep in a chair, as does John, who begins to dream. In his dream John sees himself as a shabby, destitute wanderer who is captured by pirates and forced to toil aboard their ship. Later, at sea, while John is scrubbing the vessel's deck, the Ringtailed Rhinoceros suddenly appears and leads him to the pirate captain's stock of rum. John gleefully guzzles a bottle, but he is caught by the crew and forced to walk the plank for stealing. Once in the water, John manages after a long swim to reach an island, where he is chased by soldiers who magically materialize. As he flees, John sees an elaborately dressed boy who looks just like Billie. He is the island's prince named "Good Intent". John rushes up to him and begs for protection. The prince agrees and takes the stranger to see his royal family, including his sister, "The Weeping Princess", who bears a striking resemblance to Marybelle.

At the palace John learns the princess is under a magic spell that compels her to cry constantly until the Ringtailed Rhinoceros is destroyed. He promises to kill him, but the king and queen, who are identical in appearance to Marybelle's parents, doubt his pledge. The prince now gives John an eight-legged horse named "Resolution" to help him in his search. Soon John locates the rhino, but instead of battling the beast, he allows the animal to take him to the king's wine cellar. There for several days John enjoys drinking, while reporting to the royal family that he is busy hunting. A "Counsellor Bird" fails to persuade John to resume his mission, so the bird informs the family about the deception. The king orders John beheaded for lying, but the prince intervenes and saves him again.

Armed with an old gun, a blunderbuss, and accompanied by the prince, John sets out with a renewed resolve to kill the rhino. The pair enter the beast's domain, where an array of animals threaten them and then try to lure John to the "River of Drinks". The prince, however, helps him resist the temptations. John now begins shooting at the rhino's allies, which prompts the rhino to take the offensive. He rallies the animals for an attack on the palace, so John and the prince rush back to the royal family to defend them. In the throne room, John sees a bottle of wine and is about to drink it when the rhino bursts into the room and approaches the king, queen, and weeping princess. Nearby, the prince shouts at John to kill the creature. John responds, hurling the bottle at the rhino, striking him on the head and killing him. The princess immediately stops crying and embraces John. As everyone celebrates, John awakes from his "fable-dream". The fantastic adventure has deeply affected him. When he sees Billie and Marybelle again he proclaims that he has at last killed the Ringtailed Rhinoceros and can begin life anew, fully dedicated to being a more responsible, sober man.

== Cast ==
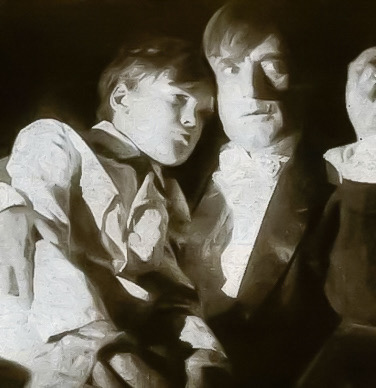
Billie (Raymond Hackett) listens to John (Hitchcock) talk about the dreaded rhino.

- Raymond Hitchcock as John Carter-Carter
- Flora Zabelle as Marybelle Loring / The Weeping Princess
- Raymond Hackett as Billie Loring / Prince Good Intent
- Herbert Fortier as Mr. Loring / the king
- Ida Waterman as Mrs. Loring / the queen
- Arthur Matthews as the secretary
- Earl Metcalfe as the grouch (credited as Edward Metcalfe) (Note: The New York actor Earl Metcalfe is identified under "Brevities Of The Business" in a 1914 issue of Moving Picture Word, as well as in other trade publications, as a member "of the Lubin stock company", who frequently worked for director George Terwilliger. He is, however, sometimes credited as "Edward Metcalfe" in advertisements for The Ringtailed Rhinoceros.)
- William Boyd as the prime minister
- Unidentified performers as the Ringtailed Rhinoceros and other animals

== Production ==
In 1914, the rapidly expanding Lubin Manufacturing Company sought to attract public attention and ticket buyers by convincing stars of vaudeville and the "legitimate" theater, as well as other celebrities, to perform in their first films with Lubin. Two such stage performers contracted by the company in 1914 were the "notorious" actress Evelyn Nesbit Thaw, who made her screen debut in the Lubin production Threads of Destiny, and the comedian Raymond Hitchcock, whose initial foray into films was The Ringtailed Rhinoceros. Widely billed as "'The Funniest Man on the Stage'", Hitchcock had reportedly rejected earlier offers to perform in motion pictures, but the comedian was finally "won over" by Lubin, which created a "unique comedy drama, written especially" for him. The Chicago-based trade journal Motography later referred to Lubin's success in contracting Hitchcock for his first screen appearance "a decided triumph".

=== Scenario ===
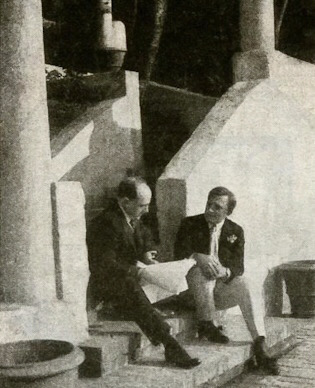
McCloskey (left) reading his scenario to Hitchcock at the comedian's estate, 1914

In the spring of 1914, Lubin staff writer and editor Lawrence McCloskey was assigned by the company to develop a special screenplay for Raymond Hitchcock and to convince him to star in it. McCloskey proceeded and composed a rough draft or '"skeleton'" of The Ringtailed Rhinoceros in just a week. He then personally visited Hitchcock at "Bellemond", the comedian's estate outside New York City, on Long Island. (Note: The name of Hitchcock's estate on Long Island is also cited in some modern sources as "Belle Monde", although in 1914 references to Lubin's use of the summer home as a filming location, the estate's name is consistently given as "Bellemond", which is the spelling used on this page.) There he read the draft to Hitchcock and his wife, actress Flora Zabelle. Both performers agreed that the proposed plot was indeed unique, and they expressed a willingness to consider working in such a production. After incorporating Hitchcock and Zabelle's ideas into his script, McCloskey spent another week polishing and finalizing the scenario. The couple then committed to the project.

=== Filming locations ===
Filming on the production occurred between mid-May and early July 1914. Director Terwilliger used two locations for Lubin's production: Hitchcock's Bellemond estate and St. Augustine, Florida. On Long Island the comedian enlisted his wealthy neighbors to perform in supporting roles and as extras on the project, a casting move that offered both convenience and cost savings to Terwilliger. Writer McCloskey in an interview described the set-up for filming at and around Bellemond:

The exterior scenes of "The Ring-Tailed Rhinoceros" were taken on Long Island, and the gardens of the homes of divers and sundry millionaires were utilized..."Yes, most of the people in the lawn party scenes are real society folk, residents of the 14 K Colony on Long Island. 'Hitchie' and I motored over the Island and we had exclusive locations galore—the residents were willing to do anything for Raymond...."

Additional footage for the production was shot in St. Augustine, Florida, a location often used by Lubin and other studios to film tropical-like, "exotic" scenery. (Note: For further information about St. Augustine's use as a filming location for studios in this period, refer to Wikipedia's page on the 1915 Fox production The Devil's Daughter.) In its July 25, 1914 issue, the trade journal Motography notifies its readers that Terwilliger with a "troupe of Lubin players" had recently returned from St. Augustine and was filming a "'photophantasy'" with Hitchcock and Zabelle.

== Release and promotion ==
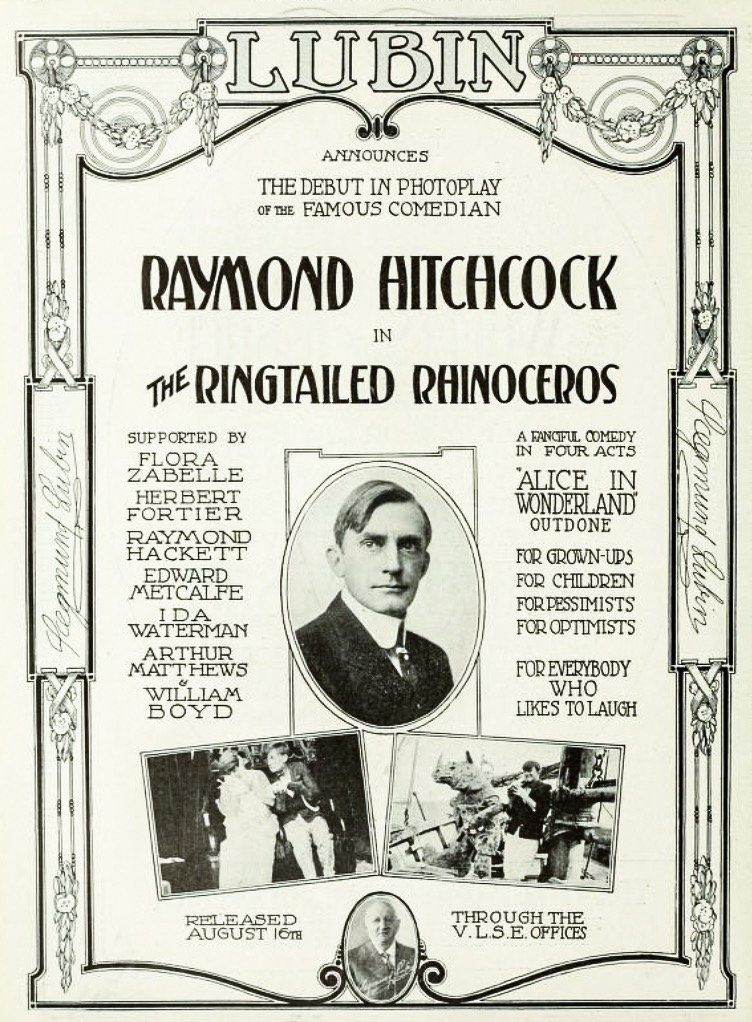
Advertisement in Moving Picture World, August 21, 1915

In August 1914—a full year before the film's release—Lubin was already promoting the completed photoplay in trade publications. That prolonged delay in its release was due to several reasons, one being scheduling adjustments linked to Lubin's new distribution partnership with three other film studios: Vitagraph, Selig, and Essanay. Under the incorporated title "V-L-S-E", the companies by early 1915 were coordinating the marketing and release dates of their films. In addition, Lubin's financial circumstances had been seriously affected by a disastrous fire in June 1914, just as filming of The Ringtailed Rhinoceros was being completed. That blaze destroyed millions of feet of film in the company's main storage vault in Philadelphia. The losses, all of which were uninsured, included extensive collections of original prints, master negatives, stock footage, unused film, and "several features ready for release". Fortunately, footage already shot for Hitchcock's debut film was processed or stored elsewhere, for it escaped destruction at that time.

Four months after the fire, in October 1914, William Henderson, a writer for The Movie Pictorial, predicted the film would be a success and viewed with marked distinction for blending comedy into the serious theme of alcohol abuse:

In this day of slap-stick buffoon[e]ry, a photophantasy such as this is distinctly unique in every way. I predict that this photoplay will create a sensation and blaze a new trail along originality's pathway. Pathos of the kind that brings the smile with the tear, and lively humor, are found at every turn of the story, and the action abounds in delicious little bits impossible to describe in words.

== Reception ==
The film received mixed reactions in August 1915. The Atlanta Constitution judged Hitchcock's first screen appearance to be "one of the most amusing comedies ever seen in motion pictures". "There is none of the slap stick and horse play in 'The Ring-Tailed Rhinoceros'", noted the newspaper, "It is a comedy of mirth-provoking situations." Thomas C. Kennedy, the critic for Motography, focused his compliments on the direction of the film, stating that "Director Terwilliger did not overlook any opportunities in the staging of this thoroughly amusing farce-comedy." However, in his review in the August 28 issue of Motion Picture News, Harvey F. Thew criticizes the pace of the four-reeler, noting that "the story is allowed to drag in many spots". (Note: News reports and Lubin's advertisements for the film in 1914, even through November that year, describe and consistently promote the picture as a five-reel production. At its release in August 1915, it was a four-reeler, which suggests the film was re-edited and cut during the delay between the picture's completion and its initial distribution.) He also expresses a general disappointment with Hitchcock's screen debut, observing that the inability to hear him speak in the medium of film robbed the comedian of his greatest strength on stage. Thew laments, "One cannot help but wish his words were audible—they look as if they might be good."

Even within the film's reviews in 1915, the issues and ongoing public debates regarding the "evils" of alcohol versus individual rights arose. A constitutional amendment to ban the production, transportation, and sale of all alcoholic beverages in the United States would not take effect until 1920, but some reviewers of The Ringtailed Rhinoceros, including Harvey Thew, recognized the film as not only an entertainment diversion but also a cinematic "preachment for prohibition". "The 'preachment'", writes Thew, "is found in an old allegory, in which the ring-tailed rhinoceros is the symbol for the demon of the bottle."

== "Lost" film status ==
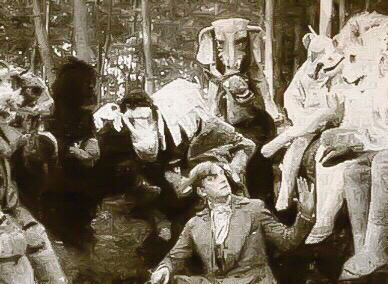
Still of John surrounded by a tiger, gorilla, elephant, lion, and other "wildlife allies" of the rhino

No full or partial reels of this Lubin production are preserved in the UCLA Film Archives, in the collection of moving images at the Museum of Modern Art, the George Eastman Museum, or in European film repositories. The Library of Congress also includes the film among the National Film Preservation Board's list of "7,200 Lost U.S. Silent Feature Films" produced between 1912 and 1929. Stills from the production, in addition to those depicted on this page, do survive as illustrations in 1914 and 1915 publications and provide a visual record of the general content of some scenes in the film.

== Second release, 1916 ==
The financial setback from the 1914 fire created ongoing cash-flow problems for Lubin and continued to disrupt its production and release schedules. In an effort to bring in some quick, much-needed revenue, the company cut the running times of several films already released in 1915 and re-released them as shorts in the spring of 1916. (Note: Additional financial problems arising from the studio's over-expansion and unfavorable court rulings led to the bankruptcy and closure of the Lubin Manufacturing Company by October 1916. Refer to cited work by Eckhardt.) Two of those films were Marie Dressler's comedy Tillie's Tomato Surprise, originally released as a six-reeler in September 1915, and The Ringtailed Rhinoceros. Lubin substantially cut each film's running time to approximately 25 minutes. In mid-April 1916, Motion Picture News published an announcement with the heading "Marie Dressler and Hitchcock Subjects Issued as 2-Reelers". Although no fragments of the abbreviated re-release of The Ringtail Rhinoceros survive, it is likely that John's extended dream sequence, the more visually interesting half of the film, comprised the content of that second run.
