= I Take This Woman (1940 film) =

- Theatrical release poster
- Directed by: W. S. Van Dyke; Frank Borzage (uncredited); Josef von Sternberg (uncredited)
- Screenplay by: James Kevin MacGuinness; Ben Hecht (uncredited)
- Based on: "A New York Cinderella" by Charles MacArthur
- Produced by: Louis B. Mayer (uncredited); Bernard H. Hyman (uncredited); Lawrence Weingarten (uncredited)
- Starring: Spencer Tracy; Hedy Lamarr
- Cinematography: Harold Rosson
- Edited by: George Boemler
- Music by: Artur Guttmann; Bronislau Kaper
- Production company: Metro-Goldwyn-Mayer
- Distributed by: Loew's Inc.
- Release date: February 2, 1940
- Running time: 98 minutes
- Country: United States
- Language: English
- Budget: $1,271,000
- Box office: $1,435,000

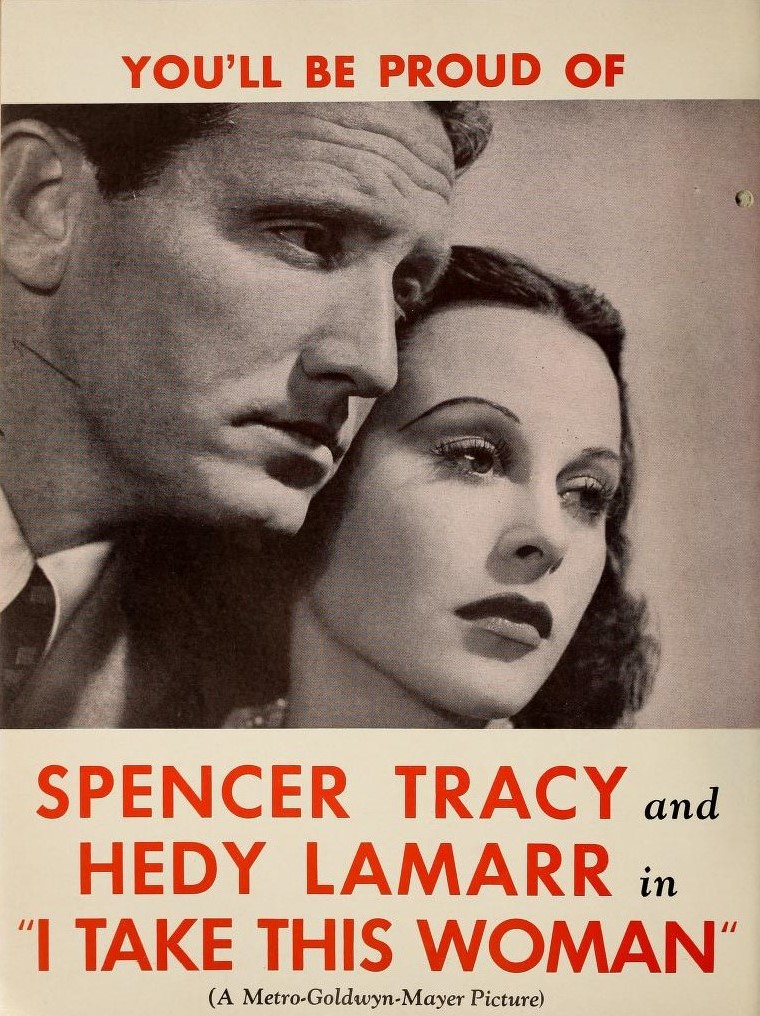
Advertisement in Film Daily, 1940

I Take This Woman is a 1940 American drama film directed by W. S. Van Dyke and starring Spencer Tracy and Hedy Lamarr. Based on the short story "A New York Cinderella" by Charles MacArthur, the film is about a young woman who attempted suicide in reaction to a failed love affair. The doctor who marries her attempts to get her to love him by abandoning his clinic services to the poor to become a physician to the rich so he can pay for her expensive lifestyle.

== Plot ==
On the way to New York in a ship, a famous psychiatrist, Dr. Karl Decker, sees a young girl, Georgi, attempting suicide by jumping from the top because of a failed romance with Phil Mayberry. The doctor rescues her and makes her understand how to live by doing real work.

After reaching New York, she visits the doctor and joins him in his practice at a clinic for the poor. They fall in love and marry. The doctor leaves his clinic and joins a famous hospital so that he can earn more money to support his wife in style. He becomes highly successful, and the owner takes him as a business partner.

Meanwhile, Phil pesters her to renew their love affair, saying that he still loves her. She finally meets with him at his apartment and asks him to stop disturbing her, realizing that she loves Karl instead. Before Georgi and Karl can depart for a belated honeymoon, Karl learns that Georgi and Phil had met in his apartment. Believing that she still loves Phil, Karl breaks off his relationship with Georgi in spite of her protest.

An important call comes from the hospital regarding a suicidal case of a young girl. Karl rushes to the hospital, but the girl dies in spite of his efforts. On the death certificate, he writes "suicide," but the father of the girl opposes him, wanting to avoid any scandal. Karl will not listen to him, and finally decides to quit working for the hospital and travel to China to do research. Before his departure, he visits his old clinic. His former patients are pleased, having heard from Georgi that he was planning to open the clinic again. But he refuses in spite of their disappointment. When some of the children, whose lives he saved, entreat him to reopen the clinic, he relents at last. Georgi asks, "Can I stay too?". Karl happily agrees, and they kiss.

== Cast ==
- Spencer Tracy as Dr. Karl Decker
- Hedy Lamarr as Georgi Gragore Decker
- Verree Teasdale as Madame "Cesca" Marcesca
- Kent Taylor as Phil Mayberry
- Laraine Day as Linda Rodgers
- Mona Barrie as Sandra Mayberry
- Jack Carson as Joe, the man yelling in the subway
- Paul Cavanagh as Bill Rodgers
- Louis Calhern as Dr. Martin Sumner Duveen
- Frances Drake as Lola Estermont
- Marjorie Main as Gertie
- George E. Stone as Sid the Taxi Driver
- Willie Best as Sambo, the Clinic Attendant
- Don Castle as Dr. Ted Fenton
- Dalies Frantz as Joe Barnes
- Reed Hadley as Bob Hampton
- Robert Milasch as Vendor (uncredited)
- Charles Trowbridge as Dr. Morris (uncredited)

== Production notes ==
Production of the film had a long and troubled history, earning it the infamous nickname I Re-Take This Woman. Director Josef von Sternberg began shooting on October 18, 1938, but was fired less than a month later over artistic differences; director Frank Borzage took over shooting on November 7th, and the production was shelved in January 1939. W.S. Van Dyke assumed direction, re-shooting nearly the entire picture, with many different cast members. Further re-takes were done in December, 1939.

== Box office ==
According to MGM records the film earned $907,000 in the US and Canada and $528,000 elsewhere resulting in a loss of $325,000.
