= The Red Widow =

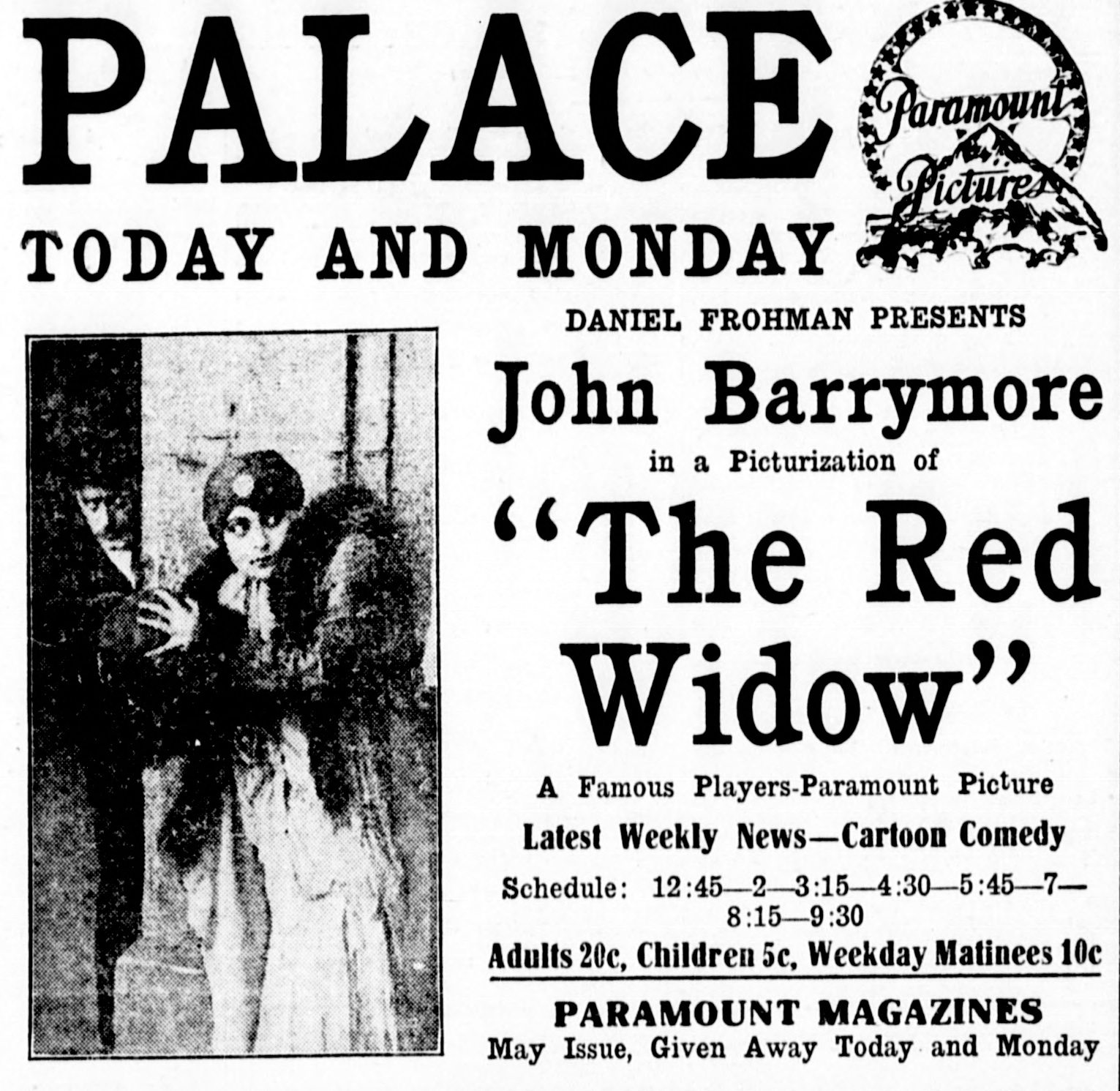
- Newspaper advertisement with image of Barrymore ducking Flora Zabelle who is holding a large bomb
- Directed by: James Durkin
- Written by: Hugh Ford (scenario)
- Based on: The Red Widow by Channing Pollock and Rennold Wolf
- Produced by: Adolph Zukor; Jesse Lasky; Daniel Frohman
- Starring: John Barrymore
- Cinematography: William F. Wagner
- Music by: Charles J. Gebest
- Distributed by: Paramount Pictures
- Release date: April 4, 1916
- Running time: 5 reels
- Country: United States
- Language: Silent

The Red Widow is a lost 1916 American silent romantic comedy film directed by James Durkin, produced by Famous Players–Lasky, and distributed by Paramount Pictures. The film was based on a 1911 Broadway musical play The Red Widow by Channing Pollock and Rennold Wolf and starring comedian Raymond Hitchcock. John Barrymore stars in this film in the Hitchcock part of Cicero Butts. Hitchcock's wife, Flora Zabelle, is the leading lady in this film.

== Cast ==
- John Barrymore as Cicero Hannibal Butts
- Flora Zabelle Hitchcock as Anna Varvara (credited as Flora Zabelle)
- John Hendricks as Baron Strickoutvich
- Eugene Redding as Ivan Scorpioff
- Millard Benson as Basil Romanoff
- George E. Mack as Popova
- Lillian Tucker as Mrs. Butts
- E.L. Fernandez as Captain Roman (credited as Mr. Fernandez)

unbilled

- John Goldsworthy

== Production ==
This particular comedy film was shot twice. The negative for the first version of The Red Widow burned up in a nitrate fire before the distribution prints could be made. This was probably the same Famous Players fire of September 11, 1915, that destroyed the first version of Mary Pickford's Esmeralda (1915). Barrymore and the cast reshot the film for no salary.
