= The Clean Up (1923 film) =

1923 film

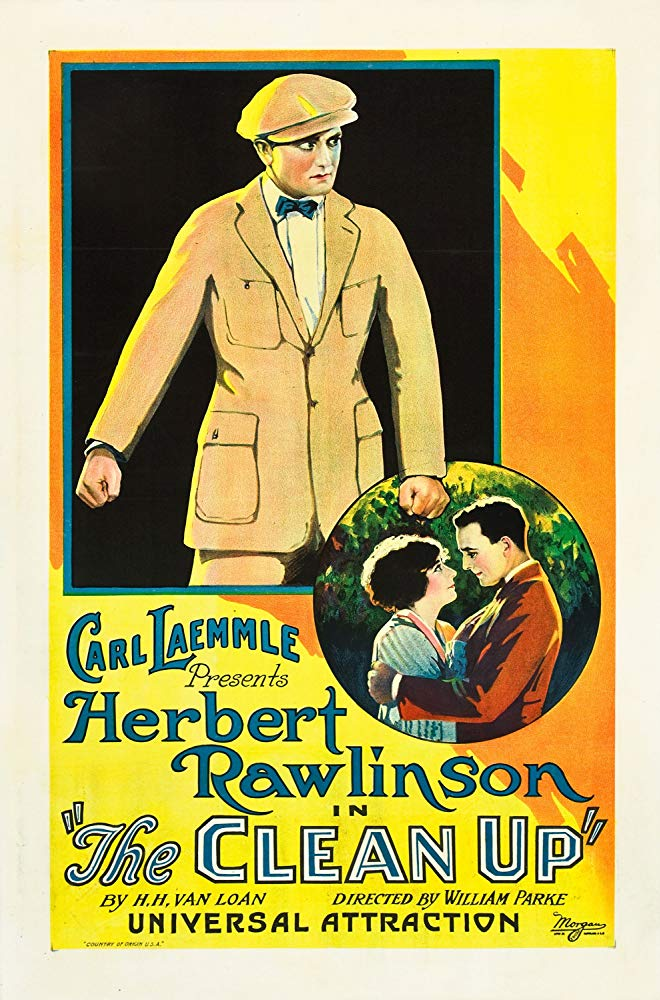
- Film poster
- Directed by: William Parke
- Written by: Harvey Gates; Eugene B. Lewis; Raymond L. Schrock; H.H. Van Loan
- Starring: Herbert Rawlinson; Claire Adams; Claire Anderson
- Cinematography: Richard Fryer
- Production company: Universal Pictures
- Distributed by: Universal Pictures
- Release date: September 24, 1923
- Running time: 50 minutes
- Country: United States
- Language: Silent (English intertitles)

The Clean Up is a 1923 American silent comedy film directed by William Parke and starring Herbert Rawlinson, Claire Adams, and Claire Anderson.

== Plot ==
As described in a film magazine review, spendthrift Montgomery Bixby's grandfather leaves him only a dollar in his will and fifty thousand dollars in cash to each citizen of the little town in which he lived. His sweetheart jilts him, as the whole town goes money mad. Crooks arrive to get in on the "clean-up." Monte decides to save the people in spite of themselves, and he enlists the aid of his grandfather's former secretary. He succeeds and then finds out that the will was only a hoax intended to teach him the value of money, and that a real inheritance is waiting for him.

== Cast ==
- Herbert Rawlinson as Montgomery Bixby
- Claire Adams as Phyllis Andrews
- Claire Anderson as Mary Reynolds
- Herbert Fortier as Robert Reynolds
- Margaret Campbell as Mrs. Reynolds
- Frank Farrington as Amos Finderson

== Bibliography ==
- Munden, Kenneth White. The American Film Institute Catalog of Motion Pictures Produced in the United States, Part 1. University of California Press, 1997.
