= Herbert Rawlinson =

English actor (1885–1953)

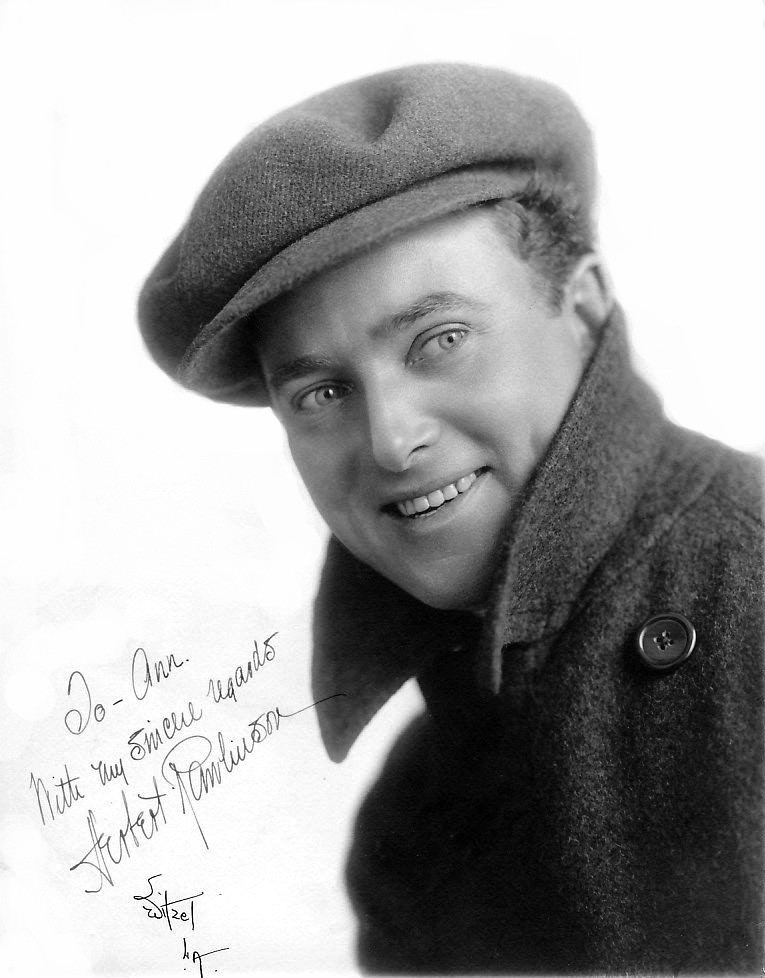
- Rawlinson, c. 1917
- Born: Herbert Banemann Rawlinson; 15 November 1885; New Brighton, Cheshire, England, UK
- Died: 12 July 1953 (aged 67)
- Occupation: Actor
- Years active: 1911–1953
- Spouses: Roberta Arnold (m. 1917–1923) Loraine Abigail Long (m. 1924–1927) Josephine Norman (died 1951)

Herbert Banemann Rawlinson (15 November 1885 – 12 July 1953) was an English-born stage, film, radio, and television actor. A leading man during Hollywood's silent film era, Rawlinson transitioned to character roles after the advent of sound films.

== Early life ==
Rawlinson was born in New Brighton, Cheshire, England, UK on 15 November 1885. He was one of the four sons and three daughters of Robert Theodore Rawlinson and his wife Emily. He sailed to America on the same ship as Charlie Chaplin and established himself as a leading man in the silent movies, before making the transition as a character actor in the "talkies".

== Recognition ==
For his contribution to the motion picture industry, Herbert Rawlinson has a star on the Hollywood Walk of Fame located at 6150 Hollywood Blvd on 8 February 1960.

== Personal life ==
Rawlinson married Roberta Arnold in 1917. They divorced in 1923 in which he had cited desertion. He married Loraine Abigail Long in 1924 and divorced in 1927. He was later married to Josephine Norman until her death on 24 January 1951. He died of lung cancer in 1953, immediately after starring in Ed Wood's 1954 crime drama Jail Bait.

== Main filmography ==
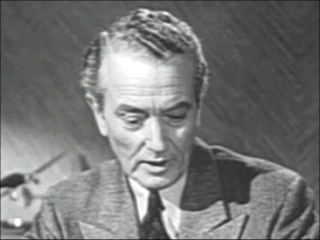
Still of Rawlinson in Lady Gangster (1941)

=== Film ===
Year	Title	Role	Notes	Ref.
1911	The New Superintendent		American short drama film directed by Francis Boggs.	
1912	The Count of Monte Cristo	Caderouse		
1913	The Sea Wolf	Humphrey Van Weyden		
1914	The Spy	Harvey Birch		
1914	Martin Eden	Arthur Morse		
1914	The Opened Shutters	John Dunham		
1914	Damon and Pythias	Pythias		
1914	Called Back	Gilbert Vaughan		
1915	The Black Box	Sanford Quest	American drama film serial directed by Otis Turner.; This serial is considered to be lost.	
1916	Little Eve Edgarton	James Barton		
1916	The Eagle's Wings	Richard Wallace		
1917	The Scarlet Crystal	Vincent Morgan		
1917	Like Wildfire	Tommy Buckman		
1917	Come Through	James Harrington Court, aka 'The Possum'		
1917	Flirting with Death	'Sky High' Billy Wardwell		
1917	The Man Trap	John Mull		
1917	The High Sign	Donald Bruce		
1918	The Flash of Fate	Randolph Shorb		
1918	Brace Up	Henry Court		
1918	Smashing Through	Jack Mason		
1918	Back to the Woods	Jimmy Raymond		
1918	Out of the Night	Bob Storrow		
1918	The Turn of the Wheel	Maxfield Grey	A lost silent film romantic drama directed by Reginald Barker.	
1918	The Mating	Dick Ives		
1918	Kiss or Kill	Henry Warner		
1918	The Floor Below		Rawlinson is credited with appearing in this film by silentera.com, but not by IMDb.	
1919	The Common Cause	Orrin Palmer	A lost American silent film comedy directed and produced by J. Stuart Blackton.; Based on the play, Getting Together, by Ian Hay, J. Hartley Manners and Percival Knight.	
1919	The Carter Case	Craig Kennedy		
1919	Good Gracious, Annabelle	John Rawson	A lost American silent society comedy film directed by George Melford.; Based on the Broadway play, Good Gracious, Annabelle by Clare Kummer.	
1919	A House Divided	Philip Carmichael		
1919	A Dangerous Affair	Terrence Redmond		
1920	The $1,000,000 Reward	Man in suit		
1920	The Poppy Trail			
1920	Passers By	Peter Waverton		
1920	Man and His Woman	Dr. John Worthing		
1921	The Wakefield Case	Wakefield Jr.		
1921	Playthings of Destiny	Geoffrey Arnold		
1921	Charge It	Philip Lawrence		
1921	You Find It Everywhere	Andrew Gibson		
1921	Wealth	Phillip Dominick		
1921	Conflict	Jevons		
1921	The Millionaire	Jack Norman		
1921	Cheated Hearts	Barry Gordon	American drama film directed by Hobart Henley and featuring Boris Karloff.; The film is considered to be lost.	
1922	The Scrapper	Malloy		
1922	Another Man's Shoes	Stuart Granger		
1922	Man Under Cover	Paul Porter	American crime film directed by Tod Browning.	
1922	The Black Bag	Billy Kirkwood		
1922	Don't Shoot	James Harrington Court		
1922	Confidence	Bob Mortimer		
1922	The Black Bag	Stuart Paton		
1922	One Wonderful Night	John D. Curtis	Silent film mystery directed by Stuart Paton.; A copy is held at the Gosfilmofond archive, Moscow.	
1923	The Scarlet Car	Billy Winthrop		
1923	The Prisoner	Philip Quentin	American drama film directed by Jack Conway and featuring Boris Karloff.; The film is considered lost.	
1923	Nobody's Bride	Jimmy Nevins		
1923	Fools and Riches	Jimmy Dorgan		
1923	Mary of the Movies	Himself	Uncredited; Silent semi-autobiographical 1923 comedy directed by John McDermott based on the career of Marion Mack.	
1923	Railroaded	Richard Ragland		
1923	The Victor	Cecil Fitzhugh Waring		
1923	The Clean Up	Montgomery Bixby		
1923	A Million to Burn	Thomas Gwynne		
1923	His Mystery Girl	Kerry Reynolds		
1924	Jack O'Clubs	John Francis Foley		
1924	Stolen Secrets	The Eel, Miles Manning		
1924	The Dancing Cheat	Brwlw Clay		
1924	High Speed	Hi Moreland		
1924	Dark Stairways	Sheldon Polk		
1924	The Tomboy	Aldon Farwell		
1925	The Prairie Wife	Duncan MacKail	American Western film directed by Hugo Ballin.; Based on a story by Arthur Stringer.; The film is considered to be lost.	
1925	My Neighbor's Wife	Allen Allwright		
1925	Every Man's Wife	Mr. Randolph		
1925	The Adventurous Sex	The Sweetheart		
1925	The Man in Blue	Tom Conlin	Silent film drama directed by Edward Laemmle.	
1925	The Flame Fighter	Jack Sparks	Serial	
1925	The Unnamed Woman	Donald Brookes		
1925	The Great Jewel Robbery	Steve Martindale		
1926	The Gilded Butterfly	Courtney Roth		
1926	Her Big Adventure	Ralph Merriwell		
1926	Phantom Police	Jack Wright	Serial	
1926	The Millionaire Policeman	Steven Wallace		
1926	Men of the Night	J. Rupert Dodds		
1926	The Belle of Broadway	Paul Merlin	American silent romantic drama film directed by Harry O. Hoyt.; This film is preserved in the Library of Congress collection.	
1926	Her Sacrifice	James Romaine		
1926	Trooper 77	Steve Manning / Trooper 77	Serial	
1927	Burning Gold	Bob Roberts		
1927	Slipping Wives	Husband	Silent comedy short film directed by Fred Guiol.	Short
1927	The Bugle Call	Capt. Randolph	Drama silent film directed by Edward Sedgwick.; The Lost Film Files database has this film as being lost.	
1927	Hour of Reckoning	Jim Armstrong		
1927	Wages of Conscience	Henry McWade		
1933	The Working Man	Reeves Co. Board Member	Uncredited	
1933	Moonlight and Pretzels	Sport Powell		
1933	Get That Venus	Editor Nash	American comedy film directed by Arthur Varney.	
1934	Enlighten Thy Daughter	Dr. Richard Stevens		
1935	The People's Enemy	Philip Francis Duke Ware		
1935	Convention Girl	Ward Hollister		
1935	Men Without Names	Crawford		
1935	Confidential	J.W. Keaton		
1935	Show Them No Mercy	Kurt Hansen		
1936	Dancing Feet	Oliver Groves		
1936	Follow the Fleet	Mr. Webber - Paradise Ballroom Owner	Uncredited	
1936	Hitch Hike to Heaven	Melville Delaney		
1936	Bullets or Ballots	Mr. Caldwell	Gangster drama film directed by William Keighley featuring Edward G. Robinson, Joan Blondell, & Humphrey Bogart.	
1936	Ticket to Paradise	Fred Townsend	American drama film directed by Aubrey Scotto.	
1936	A Son Comes Home	Bladeu	American drama film directed by E.A. Dupont.	
1936	Hollywood Boulevard	Manager of Grauman's		
1936	Mad Holiday	Captain Bromley		
1936	Robinson Crusoe of Clipper Island	Grant Jackson	A Republic Movie serial directed by Ray Taylor and Mack V. Wright.	
1936	Mysterious Crossing	District Attorney Henry R. Charters		
1937	God's Country and the Woman	Doyle		
1937	Blake of Scotland Yard	Sir James Blake		
1937	Midnight Court	District Attorney Larson	Uncredited	
1937	Nobody's Baby	Radio Audition Executive		
1937	The Go Getter	Lester	Directed by Busby Berkeley.	
1937	Make a Wish	Dr. Stevens		
1937	S.O.S. Coast Guard	Boyle, Coast guard commander	A Republic film serial directed by Alan James and William Witney.	
1937	That Certain Woman	Dr. Hartman		
1937	Back in Circulation	District Attorney Saunders	American film directed by Ray Enright.	
1937	Something to Sing About	Studio Attorney	Uncredited	
1937	Love Is on the Air	Mr. George Copelin		
1937	Over the Goal	Stanley Short		
1937	Every Day's a Holiday	Guest at Party	Uncredited	
1938	The Kid Comes Back	Mr. Redmann		
1938	Hawaii Calls	Mr. Harlow		
1938	Over the Wall	Prosecutor	Uncredited	
1938	Women Are Like That	Avery Flickner		
1938	Marie Antoinette	Goguelot	Uncredited	
1938	Under the Big Top	Herman		
1938	Valley of the Giants	Land Commissioner	Uncredited	
1938	Secrets of an Actress	Mr. Harrison	Romantic drama film directed by William Keighley.	
1938	Hard to Get	Mr. Jones	Uncredited	
1938	Torchy Gets Her Man	Tom Brennan		
1938	Peck's Bad Boy with the Circus	Race Judge	Uncredited	
1938	Orphans of the Street	Adams		
1939	Blackwell's Island	Dave Reynolds	Uncredited	
1939	Secret Service of the Air	Adm. A.C. Schuyler		
1939	You Can't Get Away with Murder	District Attorney	Crime drama directed by Lewis Seiler and starring Humphrey Bogart.	
1939	Sudden Money			
1939	Dark Victory	Dr. Carter	American drama film directed by Edmund Goulding.; The screenplay by Casey Robinson was based on the 1934 play of the same title by George Brewer and Bertram Bloch, starring Tallulah Bankhead.	
1939	Naughty but Nice	Hardwick's Attorney	Uncredited	
1939	Days of Jesse James	Bank Association Official	Uncredited	
1939	Swanee River	Army Officer	Uncredited	
1939	Money to Burn	Dover		
1940	Swiss Family Robinson	Captain		
1940	Five Little Peppers at Home	Mr. Decker		
1940	Framed	Walter Billings		
1940	Free, Blonde and 21	John Crane		
1940	Flash Gordon Conquers the Universe	Dr. Frohmann	Serial, [Chs. 1, 4]	
1940	Cross-Country Romance	Ship's Capt. Brawley	Uncredited	
1940	I Want a Divorce	Len Howard	Uncredited	
1940	King of the Royal Mounted	Ross King	Serial, [chs 1-4]	
1940	Seven Sinners	First Mate		
1941	Flying Wild	Mr. Reynolds		
1941	I Wanted Wings	Mr. Young	Uncredited	
1941	Strange Alibi	King Carney	Uncredited	
1941	The Flame of New Orleans	Party Guest	Uncredited	
1941	Sheriff of Tombstone	Dodge City Marshal	Uncredited	
1941	Adventure in Washington	Senator Jenkins	Uncredited	
1941	Blondie in Society	Mr. Judson, Bank President	Uncredited	
1941	Mystery Ship	Inspector Clark	Uncredited	
1941	Scattergood Meets Broadway	The Governor		
1941	Gentleman from Dixie	Prison Warden		
1941	Bad Man of Deadwood	Judge Gary		
1941	Lydia	Dignitary on Podium	Uncredited	
1941	It Started with Eve	Party Guest	Uncredited	
1941	King of the Texas Rangers	Ranger Colonel Lee Avery	Serial, [Chs. 1,12]	
1941	Arizona Cyclone	George Randolph		
1941	I Killed That Man	Prison Warden		
1941	Riot Squad	Police Chief		
1942	Don Winslow of the Navy	Adm. Warburton	Serial, [Ch. 1]	
1942	Broadway Big Shot	District Attorney		
1942	Stagecoach Buckaroo	Bill Kincaid		
1942	We Were Dancing	Hubert's Friend	Uncredited	
1942	Lady Gangster	D.A. Lewis Sinton		
1942	Tramp, Tramp, Tramp	Ex-Soldier Commander	Uncredited	
1942	Hello, Annapolis	Capt. Dugan		
1942	The Panther's Claw	District Attorney Bill Dougherty		
1942	Perils of the Royal Mounted	Richard Winton	Serial	
1942	I Live on Danger	Chief of Police	Uncredited	
1942	Perils of Nyoka	Maj. Reynolds	Serial, [Ch. 1], Uncredited	
1942	Sons of the Pioneers	Townsman	Uncredited	
1942	Smart Alecks	Captain Bronson		
1942	Just Off Broadway	Court Stenographer	Uncredited	
1942	Foreign Agent	Stevens		
1942	War Dogs	David J. Titus		
1942	Silver Queen	Judge		
1942	Lost Canyon	Tom Clark		
1943	Silent Witness	Benjamin Yeager		
1943	The Crime Smasher	Mr. James J. Blake		
1943	Reveille with Beverly	Announcer	Uncredited	
1943	Two Weeks to Live	J.J. Stark Sr.		
1943	King of the Cowboys	Businessman	Uncredited	
1943	Daredevils of the West	T.M. Sawyer - Banker	Serial, (Ch. 10), Uncredited	
1943	Days of Old Cheyenne	Governor Frank Shelby		
1943	Colt Comrades	Varney		
1943	The Masked Marvel	Mr. Kellering	Serial, Uncredited	
1943	Doughboys in Ireland	Larry Hunt		
1943	Where Are Your Children?	Brooks the Butler		
1943	Old Acquaintance	Red Cross Chairman	Uncredited	
1943	Riders of the Deadline	Ranger Captain Jennings		
1943	The Woman of the Town	Doc Sears		
1944	Marshal of Gunsmoke	Sam Garret		
1944	Nabonga	T.F. Stockwell	A PRC film starring Buster Crabbe and Julie London (in her film debut).; Directed by Sam Newfield.; Retitled Jungle Woman in the British Empire.	
1944	Sailor's Holiday	Director	Uncredited	
1944	Oklahoma Raiders	Colonel Rogers		
1944	Shake Hands with Murder	John Clark	American comedy mystery film directed by Albert Herman.	
1944	Lumberjack	Buck Peters		
1944	Forty Thieves	Buck Peters	American western directed by Lesley Selander.	
1944	Marshal of Reno	Editor John Palmer		
1944	Goin' to Town	Wentworth		
1944	Sheriff of Sundown	Governor Brainerd	American western drama film directed by Lesley Selander.	
1944	Hi, Beautiful	Board Member	Uncredited	
1946	Accomplice	Vincent Springer		
1946	San Quentin	Dr. Stanton	Uncredited; American film directed by Gordon Douglas.	
1947	Honeymoon	American	Uncredited	
1947	Railroaded!	Doctor Attending Cowie	Uncredited	
1948	Silent Conflict	Yardman Pete		
1948	The Argyle Secrets	Dr. Van Selbin	Uncredited	
1948	The Gallant Legion	Major Grant		
1948	The Counterfeiters	Norman Talbot		
1948	Sinister Journey	Marshal Reardon		
1948	Borrowed Trouble	Groves		
1948	Superman	Graham	Serial, [Chs. 3, 9-11, 13-15]	
1948	Strange Gamble	John Murray		
1948	Joan of Arc	Judge Marguerie	Uncredited	
1949	Brimstone	Storekeeper		
1949	Fighting Man of the Plains	Lawyer		
1950	Chain Gang	Senator Harden	Uncredited	
1951	Gene Autry and the Mounties	Inspector Wingate		
1953	The Stranger Wore a Gun	Man on Riverboat Stairs	Uncredited	
1953	The Flaming Urge	Herb	American crime film directed by Harold Ericson.	
1954	Jail Bait	Dr. Boris Gregor	Posthumous release; American film noir crime film directed by Ed Wood.	

=== Television ===
Year	Title	Role	Notes	Ref.
1952	Adventures of Superman	Rozan	1 episode	
1953	The George Burns and Gracie Allen Show	Captain Benson	1 episode	
1953	Mr. and Mrs. North	Hugo Crosset	1 episode	
