= Please Get Married =

1919 silent film

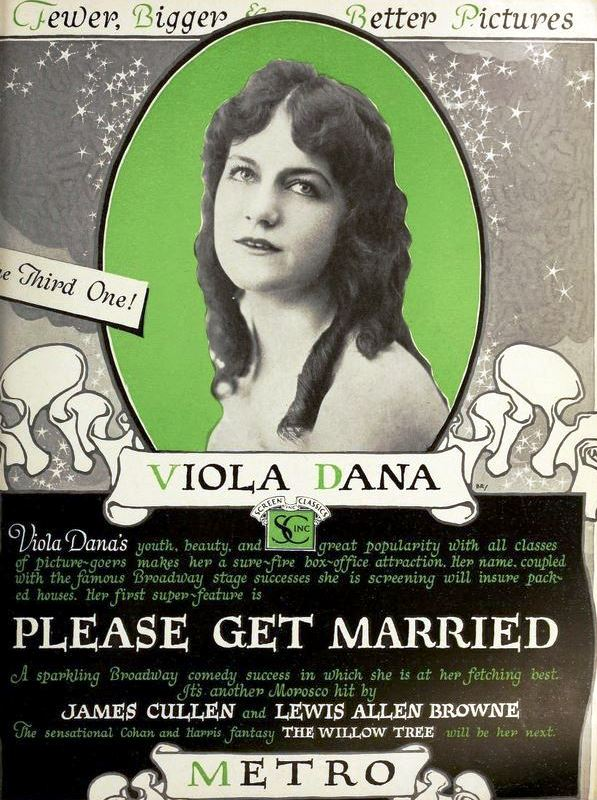
- Directed by: John Ince
- Written by: Finis Fox
- Based on: Please Get Married by Lewis Allen Browne and James F. Cullen
- Produced by: Maxwell Karger
- Starring: Viola Dana; Antrim Short; Margaret Campbell
- Cinematography: John Arnold
- Production company: Screen Classics
- Distributed by: Metro Pictures
- Release date: October 25, 1919
- Running time: 50 minutes
- Country: United States
- Languages: Silent; English intertitles

Please Get Married is a 1919 American silent comedy film directed by John Ince and starring Viola Dana, Antrim Short and Margaret Campbell. It was based on the Broadway play of the same title by Lewis Allen Browne and James F. Cullen.

== Cast ==
- Viola Dana as Muriel Ashley
- Antrim Short as Ferdinand Oliver Walton
- Margaret Campbell as Mrs. John Harper Ashley
- Harry Todd as Mr. John Harper Ashley
- Emmett King as Robert Walton
- Ralph W. Bell as Rev. Barton
- Tom Ricketts as Doctor Jenkins
- Hugh Fay as Soapy Higgins
- Joseph Hazelton as Constable
- W.K. Mesick as Detective
- William F. Moran as Hotel Clerk
- Daisy Jefferson as Hotel Maid
- Thomas Hadley as Bellboy

== Preservation ==
With no holdings located in archives, Please Get Married is considered a lost film.

== Bibliography ==
- Leonhard Gmür. Rex Ingram: Hollywood's Rebel of the Silver Screen. 2013.
- Goble, Alan. The Complete Index to Literary Sources in Film. Walter de Gruyter, 1999.
