= The Black Bag =

1922 film directed by Stuart Paton

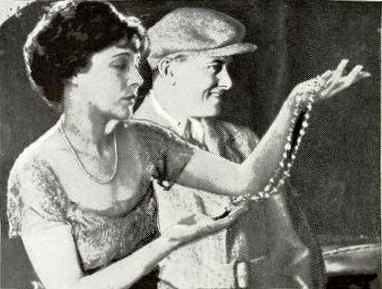
- Still with Virginia Valli and Herbert Rawlinson
- Directed by: Stuart Paton
- Written by: George Hively; Bernard H. Hyman
- Based on: The Black Bag by Louis Joseph Vance
- Produced by: Carl Laemmle
- Starring: Herbert Rawlinson
- Cinematography: Virgil Miller; Irving B. Ruby
- Distributed by: Universal Film Manufacturing Company
- Release date: June 5, 1922
- Running time: 5 reels
- Country: United States
- Language: Silent (English intertitles)

The Black Bag is a lost 1922 American silent mystery film directed by Stuart Paton and starring Herbert Rawlinson. It was produced and distributed by the Universal Film Manufacturing Company.

== Plot ==
As described in a film magazine, wealthy Dorothy Calender withdraws a string of pearls from her uncle's keeping to assist her brother with a debt. A detective is following her about and with the aid of others almost succeeds in getting his hands on the pearls. Billy Kirkwood, who thinks Dorothy is a thief but wants to save her from her folly, secures the pearls from the escaping crooks and restores them to the young woman. Later it develops that the detective is dishonest and the whole gang is locked up, while Dorothy declares her love for the man who saved her property.

== Cast ==
- Herbert Rawlinson as Billy Kirkwood
- Virginia Valli as Dorothy Calender
- Bert Roach as Mulready
- Clara Beyers as Mrs. Hallam
- Charles King as Freddie Hallam
- Herbert Fortier as Samuel Brentwick
- Lew Short as Burgoyne
- John B. O'Brien as Martin
