= Kessinger Publishing =

American publishing house

- Founded: 1988; 38 years ago
- Country of origin: United States
- Headquarters location: Whitefish, Montana
- Official website: kessinger.net

Kessinger Publishing, LLC is an American print-on-demand publishing company located in Whitefish, Montana, that specializes in reproductions of rare, out-of-print books. In 2009, the company produced 190,175 titles and was reported to be the third-largest producer of "non-traditional" books that year, earning recognition from Kelly Gallagher.

The Register reported in 2009 that volume 1 of a book by Lafcadio Hearn was not available for a full preview at Google Books because it was marked as "copyrighted material" and offered for sale by Kessinger Publishing. According to the article, some "scholars were outraged" because the book was previously in the public domain (accused them of copyfraud), and criticized Kessinger Publishing for making the Internet copy of the book "useless to scholars" by forcing them to purchase it.
