= George Downing Clarke =

British-born American film actor (1859–1930)

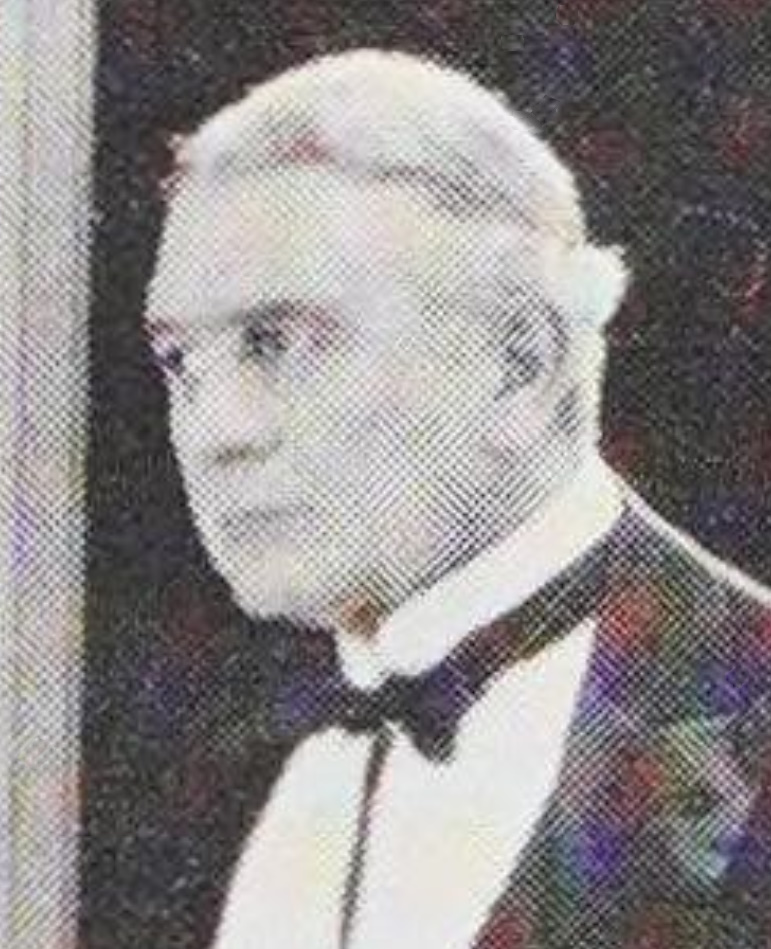
- George Downing Clarke in 1920 (a still from Remodeling Her Husband).
- Born: George Downing Clarke; 1859; Edgbaston, Birmingham, England
- Died: 17 August 1930 (aged 71); New Haven, Connecticut
- Other names: George Clarke, Downing Clarke
- Occupations: Actor (stage and screen), stage manager, theatre manager

George Downing Clarke (1859 – 17 August 1930) was a British-born stage and film actor who emigrated to the United States where he acted in Broadway theatrical productions and later appeared in films in a decade-long career during the silent era.

After success as a theatrical actor in England, Clarke arrived in New York in 1892 where he worked as a stage actor and manager, and later as a theatre manager, most often associated with the theatrical entrepreneurs Charles Frohman and David Belasco. In 1915 he began to act in films, initially in a series of Lubin Manufacturing Company productions. During his screen career from 1915 to 1925 Clarke appeared in more than forty films, working with various production companies. After 1918 his screen roles were credited as 'Downing Clarke'.

== Biography ==
=== Early years ===
George Downing Clarke was born in 1859 at Edgbaston, a suburb of Birmingham in the West Midlands of England, the son of Richard Clarke and Sarah (née Baldwin). He was a descendant of Sir George Downing (hence his middle name).

By 1871 the Clarke family was living at Coleshill in Warwickshire, 11 miles (18 km) east of Birmingham. George was educated at Leamington College, near Warwick. His father died in June 1876 at Castle Bromwich in the West Midlands.

=== An acting career ===
In 1881 Clarke, recorded as a medical student, was living with his older brother William at Kings Norton, a suburb of Birmingham

George Clarke and Kate Tailby were married in December 1882 at Kings Norton.

George Clarke began a career as an actor in the theatre and "quickly attained a position of prominence on the English stage". During an engagement at the Garrick Theatre in London he appeared before Prince Albert Edward and Princess Alexandra.

In 1891 Clarke was lodging with a wine merchant in Bromsgrove Street in Birmingham.

=== New York theatre ===
George and his wife emigrated to the United States in 1892.

Clarke worked as a theatre actor in the United States. His first stage roles in America was with Charles Frohman at the Star Theatre in New York. For a number of years Clarke was employed as Frohman's stage manager.

George and Kate Clarke had a daughter born in 1894, but the couple divorced in 1895. A second daughter was born in 1896.

In September 1899 Clarke was a cast member in Zaza, an English-language adaptation of a French play, produced by Charles Frohman at New York's Garrick Theatre.

Clarke was a cast member of Shakespeare's Romeo and Juliet, a production by Liebler & Co. at the Knickerbocker Theatre on Broadway. The play ran from late May to June 1903. In January 1904 Clarke played a role in The Taming of the Shrew.

In September 1904 Clarke was a cast member in The Music Master at the Belasco Theatre. He played the role of "the seigneur" in the romantic drama The Harvester (an English adaptation of Le Chemineau) which opened at New York's Lyric Theatre on 10 October 1904. The production featured Otis Skinner in the lead role. In December 1904 The Harvester was playing at the Grand Opera House in Chicago.

In New York Clarke lived with his younger brother Franklin at 203 West 100th Street. In May and June 1907 he performed in a production of Uncle Tom's Cabin.^{[A]}

In June 1909 Clarke travelled back to England.

In 1910 Clarke was recorded as working as a theatre manager and living with his brother Franklin in Ward 12 of Manhattan, New York. He was listed as a cast member of the following theatrical productions: The Upstart at Maxine Elliott's Theatre in September 1910, The Thunderbolt at the New Theatre (which opened on 12 November 1910), and Nobody's Daughter at Daly's Theatre in February 1911.^{[B]}

In 1912 Clarke was employed by David Belasco as manager of his theatre on West Forty-fourth Street in New York. He remained with Belasco for two years. In August 1912 Clarke travelled to Los Angeles to supervise "the business interests" of The Drums of Oude vaudeville production at the Orpheum Theatre. In a production at the Belasco Theatre in New York in about 1913, he personally received President Taft after the performance. In August 1914 Harry Walker replaced Clarke as business manager of David Belasco's theatre.

=== Films ===
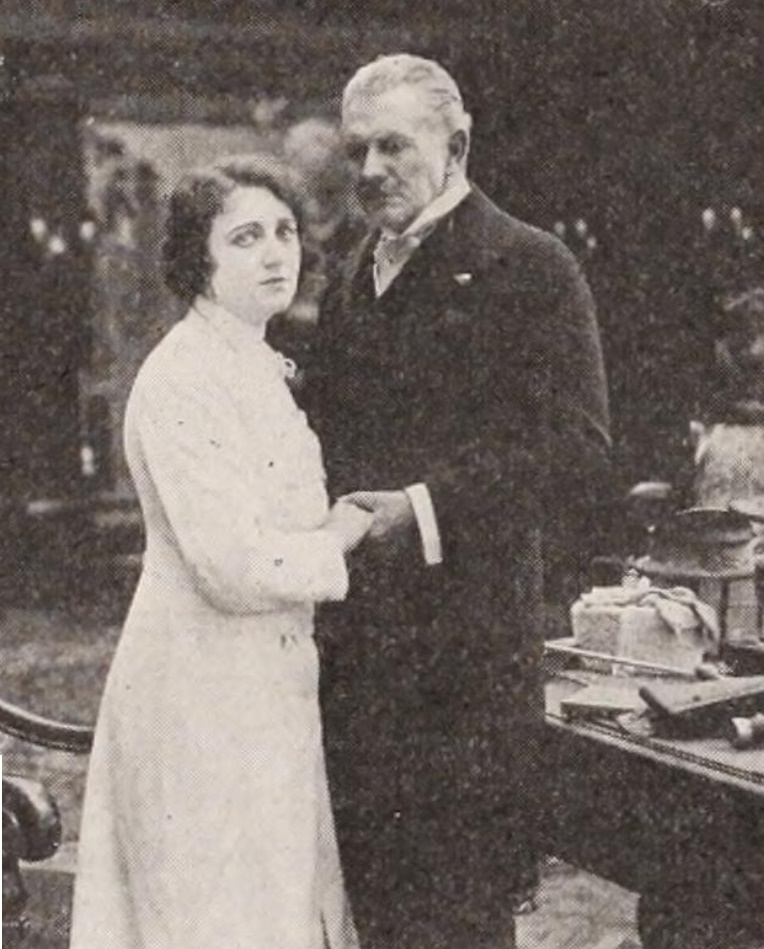
Betty Brice and George Clarke in a still from the 1915 film The Rights of Man.

In 1915 George Clarke became involved in film acting, initially in productions by the Lubin Manufacturing Company. Clarke was aged fifty-five by that stage. Throughout his decade-long career as an actor in silent films he mainly played secondary or utility acting roles, often depicting an elderly character. In the films completed during the period from 1915 to 1918 he was credited as 'George Clarke'. From his first post-war film, released in December 1919, his film roles were credited as 'Downing Clarke'.

In early 1915 Clark was one of the cast members of Road O' Strife, a fifteen-part serial directed by John Ince and produced by the Lubin Manufacturing Company. Clark became a regular performer in films produced by the Philadelphia-based Lubin company. He appeared in about twenty Lubin productions, both multi-reel features and ten short films, released in the period from April 1915 to July 1916.

In 1915 Clarke had a leading role in the Lubin Company's film The Rights of Man, playing 'Prince Sigismund', the father of 'Princess Lorha' (played by Betty Brice). In early 1916 Clarke was in the supporting cast of The Flames of Johannis, a five-reel Lubin production with Nance O'Neil in the dual lead roles.

In 1916 Clarke was living at the St. Paul Hotel in New York. In September 1916 it was reported that he was to work as an actor in films made by William Fox in the United States. During the period from late 1916 to 1925 Clarke worked for a number of different film production companies, including the Fox Film Corporation, Robertson-Cole Pictures Corporation and Paramount Pictures.

By 1920 Clarke was married to Katherine --- (born in Germany), living in Ward 15 of Manhattan, New York.

In 1920 Clarke was cast in the film The Man Who Lost Himself, in which the celebrated English stage actor William Faversham (who like Clarke was working in the United States), played the dual roles of an English nobleman and a penniless American in London. Later that year Clarke played the role of 'Mr. Wakefield' in Remodeling Her Husband, the only film directed by the actress Lillian Gish, with her sister Dorothy Gish in the lead role.

In 1924 Clarke was cast as Lord Chamberlain in D. W. Griffith's historical romantic film America, set during the events of the American Revolutionary War. Later in 1924 he was cast as Lord Chesterfield in the historical romantic drama Monsieur Beaucaire, a major production by Paramount Pictures with Rudolph Valentino in the lead role.

=== Last years ===
George Downing Clark died on 17 August 1930 at New Haven, Connecticut, aged 71.

== Filmography ==
Actor (as George Clarke)

- The Road O' Strife (April 1915), Lubin Manufacturing Company (serial).
- The College Widow (May 1915), Lubin Manufacturing Company.
- An Hour of Freedom (July 1915), Lubin Manufacturing Company (short film).
- The Climbers (August 1915), Lubin Manufacturing Company.
- Under the Fiddler's Elm (August 1915), Lubin Manufacturing Company (short film).
- The Great Ruby (September 1915), Lubin Manufacturing Company.
- Queenie of the Nile (September 1915), Lubin Manufacturing Company (short film).
- When Youth is Ambitious (October 1915), Lubin Manufacturing Company (short film).
- Playing Horse (October 1915), Lubin Manufacturing Company (short film).
- The Rights of Man: A Story of War's Red Blotch (October 1915), Lubin Manufacturing Company.
- A Man's Making (December 1915), Lubin Manufacturing Company.
- Sweeter Than Revenge (December 1915), Lubin Manufacturing Company.
- The Evangelist (January 1916), Lubin Manufacturing Company.
- The Uplift (February 1916), Lubin Manufacturing Company (short film).
- Her Wayward Sister (February 1916), Lubin Manufacturing Company.
- The Flames of Johannis (April 1916), Lubin Manufacturing Company.
- Love and Bullets (April 1916), Lubin Manufacturing Company (short film).
- The Winning Number (May 1916), Lubin Manufacturing Company (short film).
- Two Smiths and a Haff (June 1916), Lubin Manufacturing Company (short film).
- Otto's Vacation (July 1916), Lubin Manufacturing Company (short film).
- Immediate Lee (November 1916), American Film Manufacturing Company.
- The Vixen (December 1916), Fox Film Corporation.
- Twisted Trails (December 1916), Selig Polyscope Company.
- The Tiger Woman (February 1917), Fox Film Corporation.
- Redemption (June 1917), Triumph Films.
- The Silent Master (June 1917), Robert Warwick Film.
- Marriages are Made (October 1918), Fox Film Corporation.

Actor (as Downing Clarke)

- The Capitol (December 1919), Artco Productions Inc.
- Captain Swift (April 1920), Vitagraph Company of America.
- The Wonder Man (May 1920), Robertson-Cole Pictures Corporation.
- The Man Who Lost Himself (May 1920), Faversham Productions.
- Remodeling Her Husband (June 1920), New Art Film Company.
- The Stealers (October 1920), Robertson-Cole Pictures Corporation.
- The Ghost in the Garret (February 1921), New Art Film Company.
- Know Your Men (March 1921), Fox Film Corporation.
- When Knighthood Was in Flower (September 1922), Cosmopolitan Productions.
- The Headless Horseman (November 1922), Sleepy Hollow Corporation.
- America (February 1924), D. W. Griffith Productions.
- Monsieur Beaucaire (August 1924), Paramount Pictures.
- Sandra (September 1924), Associated First National Pictures (uncredited).
- The Fool (November 1925), Fox Film Corporation.

== Notes ==
A.The following role (attributed to George Clarke in the Internet Broadway Database) was performed by an older actor named George Clarke (1840–1906): The Embassy Ball in March and April 1906, playing the role of a senator from Oregon (Clarke's last theatrical role before his death).

B.The following roles (attributed to George Clarke in the Internet Broadway Database) appear to be performed by a younger actor named George Clark: the role of 'Eggleston Witherspoon' (the son of 'Mr. Witherspoon') in The Model (Harris Theatre, during February 1912); the role of 'Sweeney' ("an office boy") in The Co-Respondent (Booth Theatre, during April and May 1916).
