= The City of Purple Dreams =

The City of Purple Dreams may refer to:

- The City of Purple Dreams (1918 film), a silent American film directed by Colin Campbell
- The City of Purple Dreams (1928 film), a silent American film directed by Duke Worne
