= Florence Hackett =

American actress

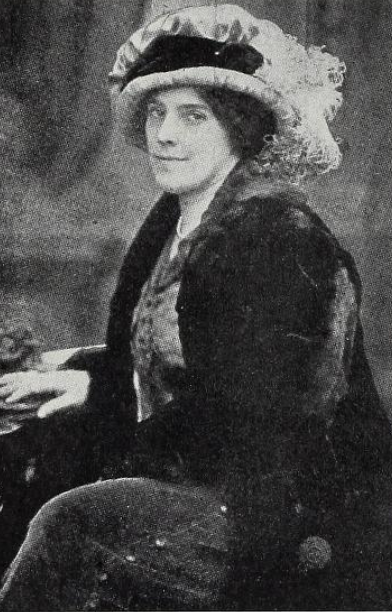
- Florence Hackett, from a 1913 publication
- Born: Florence Hart; January 1882; Buffalo, New York, United States
- Died: August 21, 1954 (aged 72); New York City, New York, United States
- Occupation: Actress
- Years active: 1912–1920
- Spouse(s): Maurice Hackett; Arthur V. Johnson
- Children: Albert Hackett; Raymond Hackett

Florence Hackett (née Hart; January 1882 – August 21, 1954) was an American film actress in the silent era. She was allegedly married to veteran film star Arthur V. Johnson, reputedly D.W. Griffith's favorite actor. Previously she was married to a man named Maurice Hackett and had two sons, Albert Hackett and Raymond Hackett and a daughter, Jeanette Hackett. Hackett was the proverbial stage mother involving her sons first in the theater then in motion pictures. From 1912 she and Johnson played in numerous films together with him directing many of them right up to his 1916 death. They were the type of films classified today as 'shorts', that is they ran one or two reels. Her boys also appeared in some of the films making the work more of a family affair. She made her last known or credited film appearance in 1920.

== Partial filmography ==
- Divided Interests (1911)
- The Physician's Honor (1912)
- The Antique Ring (1912)
- Gingerbread Cupid (1912)
- A Matter of Business (1912)
- The Preacher and the Gossips (1912)
- The Spoiled Child (1912)
- A Child's Devotion (1912)
- When John Brought Home His Wife (1913)
- The Burden Bearer (1913)
- The Pawned Bracelet (1913)
- The Power of the Cross (1913)
- The School Principal (1913)
- The District Attorney's Conscience (1913)
- The Beloved Adventurer (1914) (*serial)
- The Climbers (1915)
- Evidence (1915)
- The Evangelist (1916)
- The Yellow Passport (1916)
