= The Climbers (1927 film) =

1927 film by Paul L. Stein

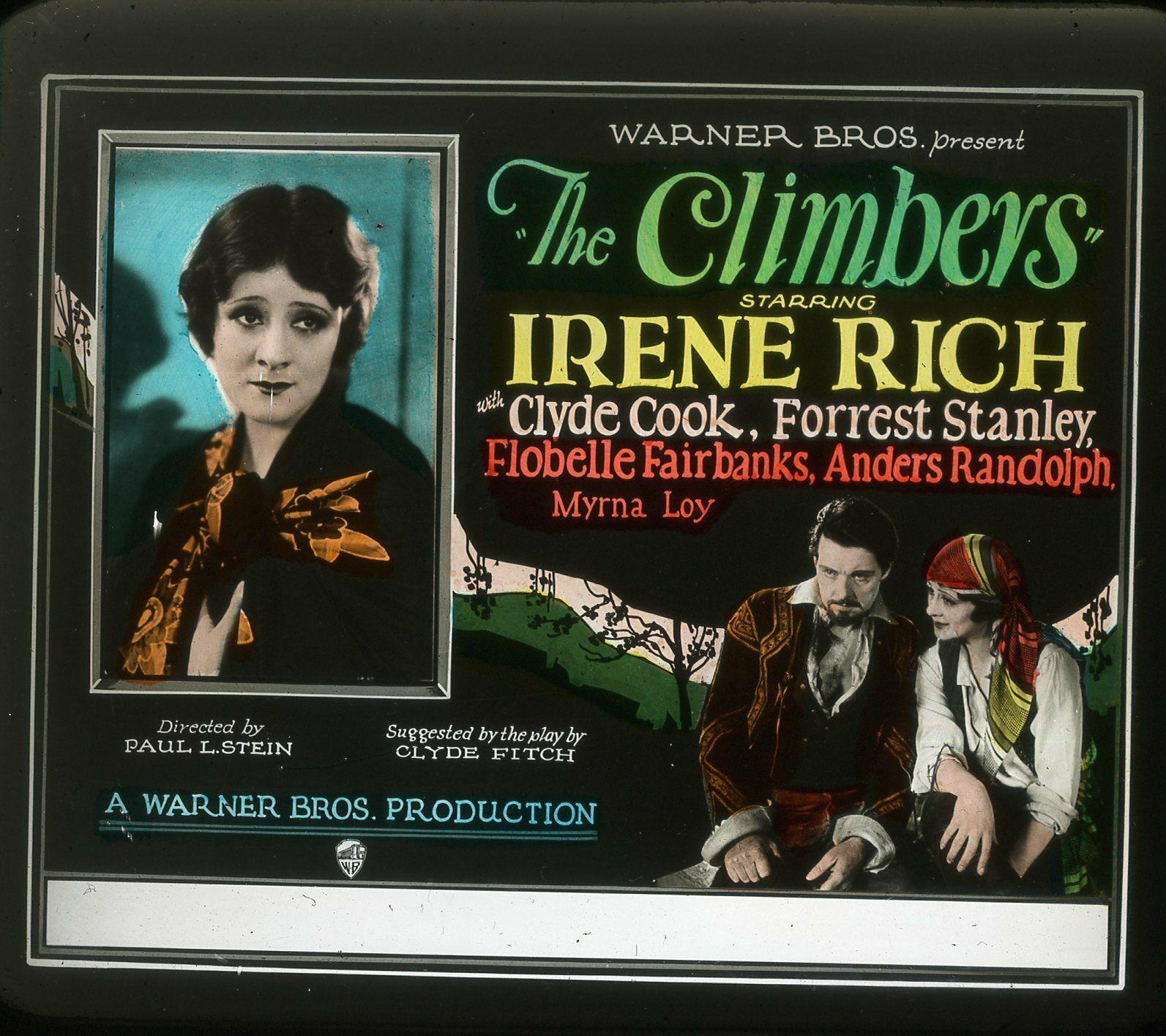
- Directed by: Paul L. Stein
- Written by: Tom Gibson (scenario)
- Based on: The Climbers (1901 play) by Clyde Fitch
- Starring: Irene Rich
- Cinematography: Frank Kesson
- Production company: Warner Bros.
- Distributed by: Warner Bros.
- Release date: May 14, 1927
- Running time: 7 reels; 6,621 ft
- Country: United States
- Language: Silent (English intertitles)

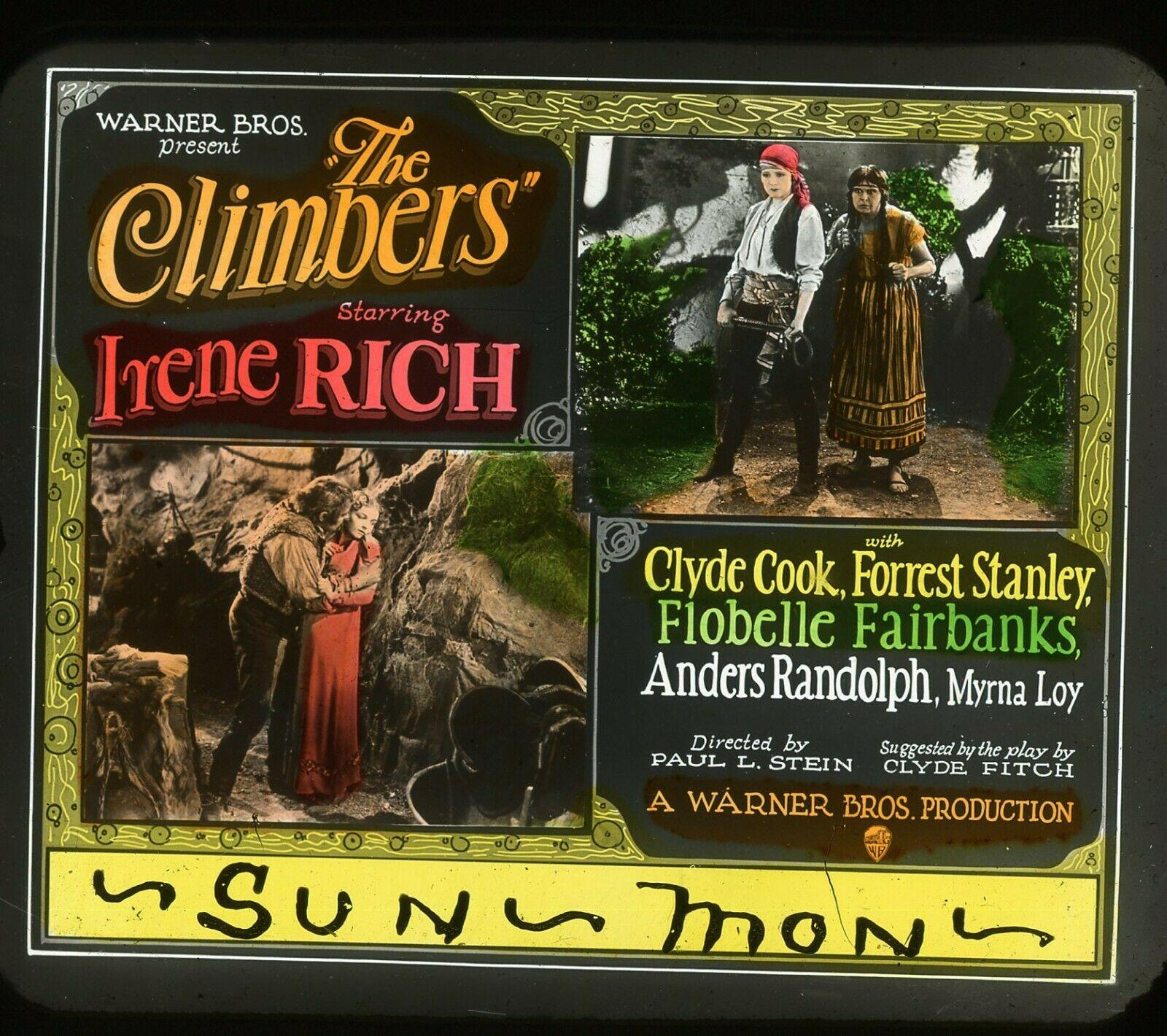
surviving lantern slide with pictorials of this lost film.

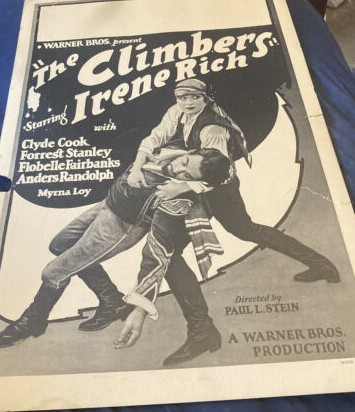
Window card advert

The Climbers is a 1927 silent film produced and distributed by Warner Bros. The film stars Irene Rich and was directed by Paul Stein. It was based on Clyde Fitch's 1901 play of the same name, but bore scant resemblance to it.

Previous versions of Fitch's play had been made, under the same name, in 1915 with Gladys Hanson and also in 1919 with Corinne Griffith.

== Plot ==
The action takes place in Spain and Puerto Rico during the early 19th-century reign of Ferdinand VII. The Duchess of Arrogan is the victim of the machinations of court "climber" Countess Veya. The Countess arranges to hide the king's enemy, Duke Cordova in the Duchess's room where he is discovered resulting in the banishment of both to the colony of Puerto Rico, and the Duchess's estrangement from her powerful husband. In exile the Duchess successfully but cruelly manages her extensive land holdings, nursing bitterness against all men, while Cordova becomes the bandit El Blanco. The two are thrown together and begin an affair. The Duchess's daughter Laska arrives, fleeing an unwelcome marriage to which the death of her father has left her vulnerable. Laska is kidnapped and rescued. The Duchess has a happy resolution, reunited with her daughter and Cordova.

== Cast ==
- Irene Rich as Duchess of Arrogan
- Clyde Cook as Pancho Mendoza
- Forrest Stanley as Duke Cordova
- Florence Fair as Sasha (*also called Flobelle Fairbanks)
- Myrna Loy as Countess Veya
- Anders Randolf as Martinez
- Dot Farley as Juana
- Rosemary Cooper as Queenalso
- Nigel Barrie as Duke of Arrogan
- Joseph Striker as Ensign Carlos
- Hector Sarno as Miguel
- Max Barwyn as King Ferdinand VII
- Martha Franklin as Clotilda

== Preservation ==
The Climbers is currently presumed lost. In February of 2021, the film was cited by the National Film Preservation Board on their Lost U.S. Silent Feature Films list.

== See also ==
- List of early Warner Bros. sound and talking features
