= The Climbers (1919 film) =

1919 film by Tom Terriss

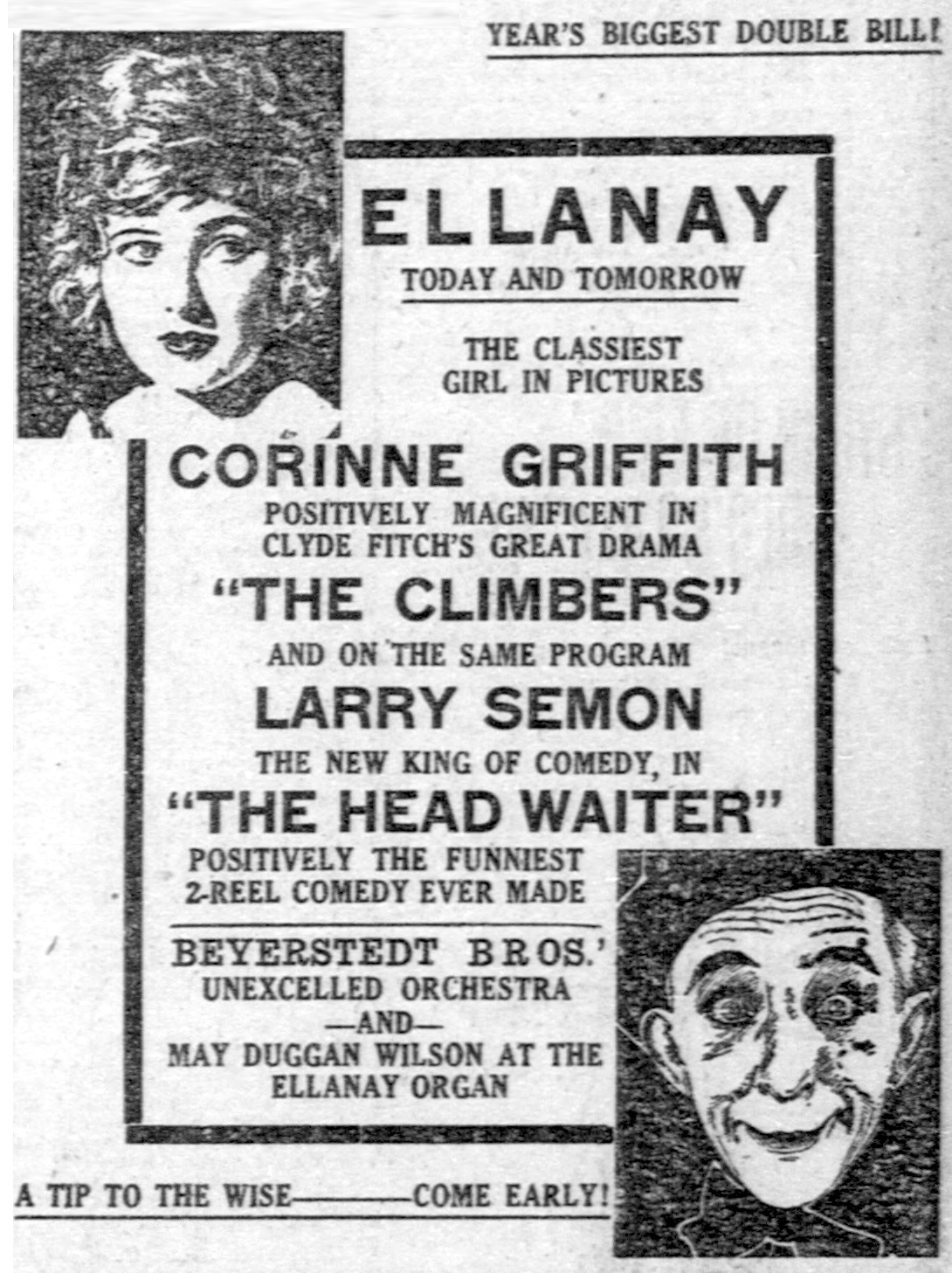
- Contemporary newspaper advertisement with The Climbers as a double feature with The Head Waiter (1919)
- Directed by: Tom Terriss
- Written by: Lucien Hubbard (scenario)
- Based on: The Climbers by Clyde Fitch
- Produced by: Vitagraph Company of America
- Starring: Corinne Griffith
- Cinematography: Tom Malloy
- Edited by: George Randolph Chester
- Distributed by: Vitagraph Company of America
- Release date: November 8, 1919
- Running time: 5 reels; 4,644 feet
- Country: United States
- Language: Silent (English intertitles)

The Climbers is a 1919 American silent comedy-drama film produced and distributed by the Vitagraph Company of America. It is based on Clyde Fitch's 1901 Broadway play. This film was directed by Tom Terriss and stars Corinne Griffith.

A previous version of Fitch's play had been made in 1915 as The Climbers with Gladys Hanson and a later version in 1927 again as The Climbers with Irene Rich.

A print is preserved in the Library of Congress.

== Plot ==
In order to keep his social-climbing wife and daughters in the lifestyle they are accustomed to, wealthy George Hunter makes some large investments in the stock market, but the stocks crash, and he loses a great deal of money. His wealthy aunt offers to bail the family out, but complications ensue.

== Cast ==
- Corinne Griffith as Blanche Sterlin
- Hugh Huntley as Richard Sterling
- Percy Marmont as Ned Warden
- Henry Hallam as George Hunter
- Josephine Whittell as Clara Hunter
- Jane Jennings as Aunt Ruth
- James Spottswood as James Garfield Trotter
- Corinne Barker as Julia Godesby
- Emily Fitzroy as Mrs. Hunter
- Charles Halton as Jordan
- James A. Furey
