= Wickedness Preferred =

1928 film

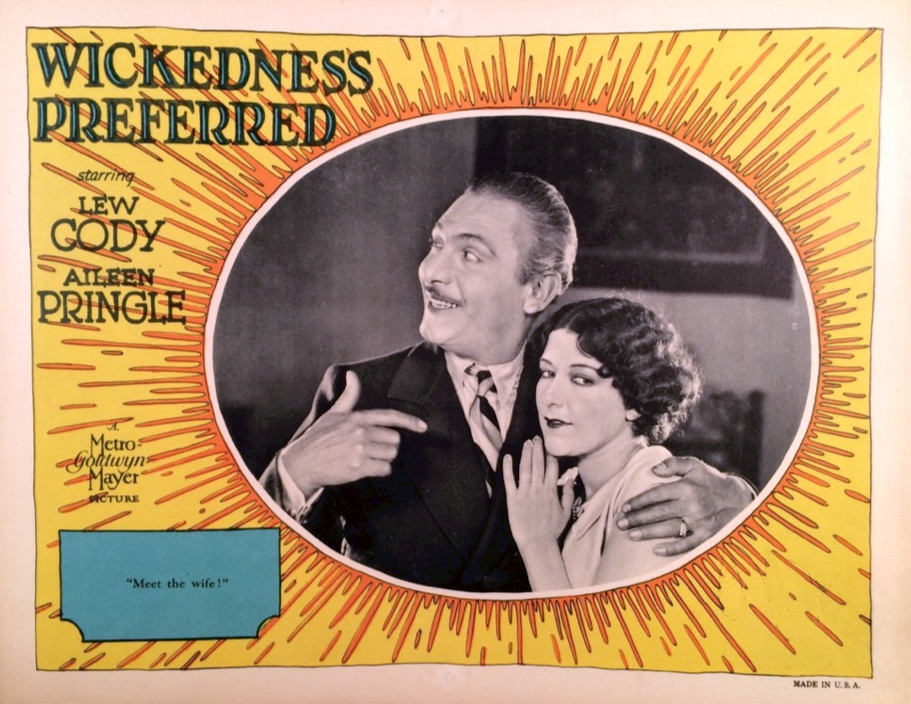
- Lobby card
- Directed by: Hobart Henley
- Screenplay by: Colin Clements; Robert E. Hopkins; Florence Ryerson
- Starring: Lew Cody; Aileen Pringle; Mary McAllister; Bert Roach; George K. Arthur
- Cinematography: Clyde De Vinna
- Edited by: William Hamilton
- Production company: Metro-Goldwyn-Mayer
- Distributed by: Metro-Goldwyn-Mayer
- Release date: January 28, 1928
- Running time: 67 minutes
- Country: United States
- Language: Silent (English intertitles)

Wickedness Preferred is a lost 1928 American silent comedy film, directed by Hobart Henley, and written by Colin Clements, Robert E. Hopkins and Florence Ryerson. The film stars Lew Cody, Aileen Pringle, Mary McAllister, Bert Roach, and George K. Arthur. The film was released on January 28, 1928, by Metro-Goldwyn-Mayer.

== Cast ==
- Lew Cody as Anthony Dare
- Aileen Pringle as Kitty Dare
- Mary McAllister as Babs Burton
- Bert Roach as Homer Burton
- George K. Arthur as Leslie
- Rosebud Binkley (uncredited)
- Julia Griffith as Dowager (uncredited)
