= The Ace of Spades (serial) =

1925 film by Henry MacRae

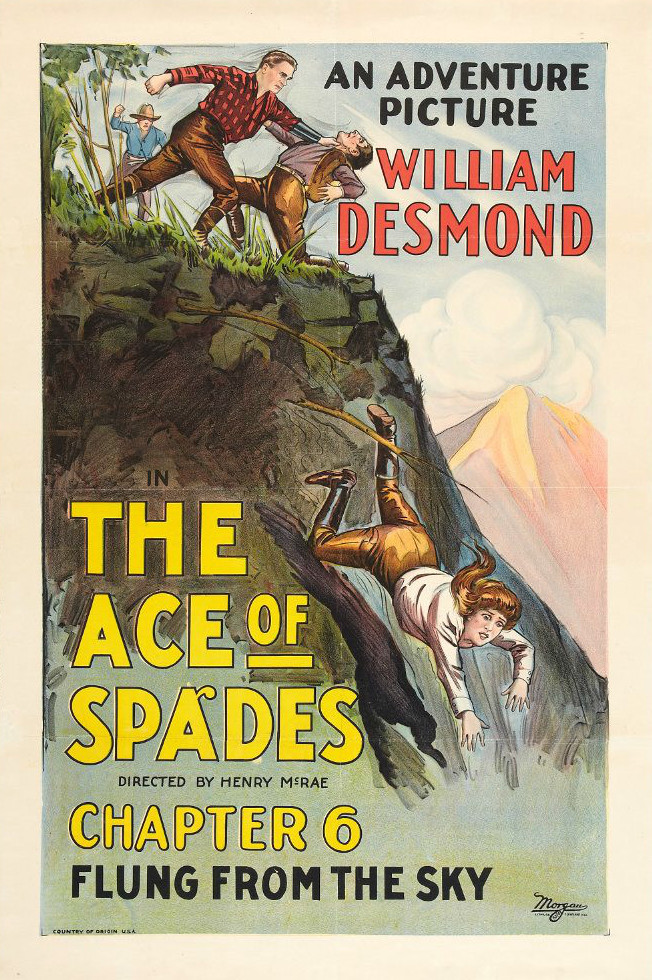
- Poster for Chapter 6
- Directed by: Henry MacRae
- Written by: Isadore Bernstein; William Lord Wright
- Starring: William Desmond; Mary McAllister
- Distributed by: Universal Pictures
- Release date: October 19, 1925
- Running time: 15 episodes
- Country: United States
- Languages: Silent; English intertitles

The Ace of Spades is a 1925 American silent Western film serial directed by Henry MacRae. The serial is considered to be a lost film.

== Cast ==
- William Desmond as Dan Harvey
- Mary McAllister as Olive Heath
- Albert J. Smith as Joe Deneen
- William Steele as Jim Heath (credited as William A. Steele)
- Cathleen Calhoun as Parker Dice Ann
- Jack Pratt as Gideon Trask
- Clark Comstock as Martin Heath (credited as Clarke Comstock)
- Frank Lanning as Francois
- John Herdman as Thomas Jefferson
- William De Vaull as Napoleon Bonaparte (credited as William P. De Vaul)
- John Shanks as Tallyrand
- Aaron Edwards as Lucien Bonaparte
- Bert Sprotte as James Monroe
- Harry Lorraine as Barbe Barbois
- Monte Montague as Henchman

== Chapter titles ==
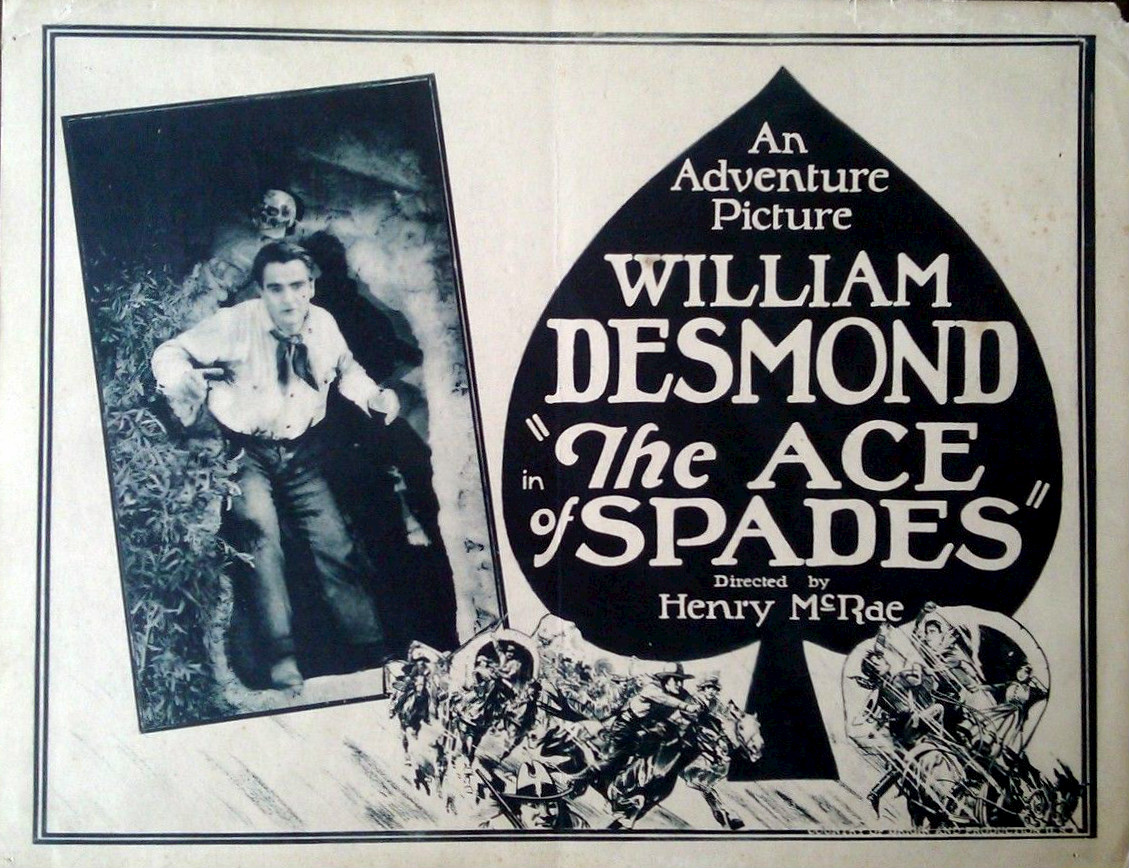
Lobby card

1. The Fatal Card
2. No Greater Love
3. Whirling Waters
4. Fires of Sacrifice
5. Thundering Hoofs
6. Flung from the Sky
7. The Trail of Terror
8. The Lariat of Death
9. Fingers of Fate
10. The Road to Ruin
11. The Chasm of Peril
12. The Avalanche
13. The Fury of Fate
14. The Chasm of Courage
15. A Deal of Destiny

== See also ==
- List of American films of 1925
- List of film serials
- List of film serials by studio
- List of lost films
