= David Torrence (actor) =

Scottish actor (1864–1951)

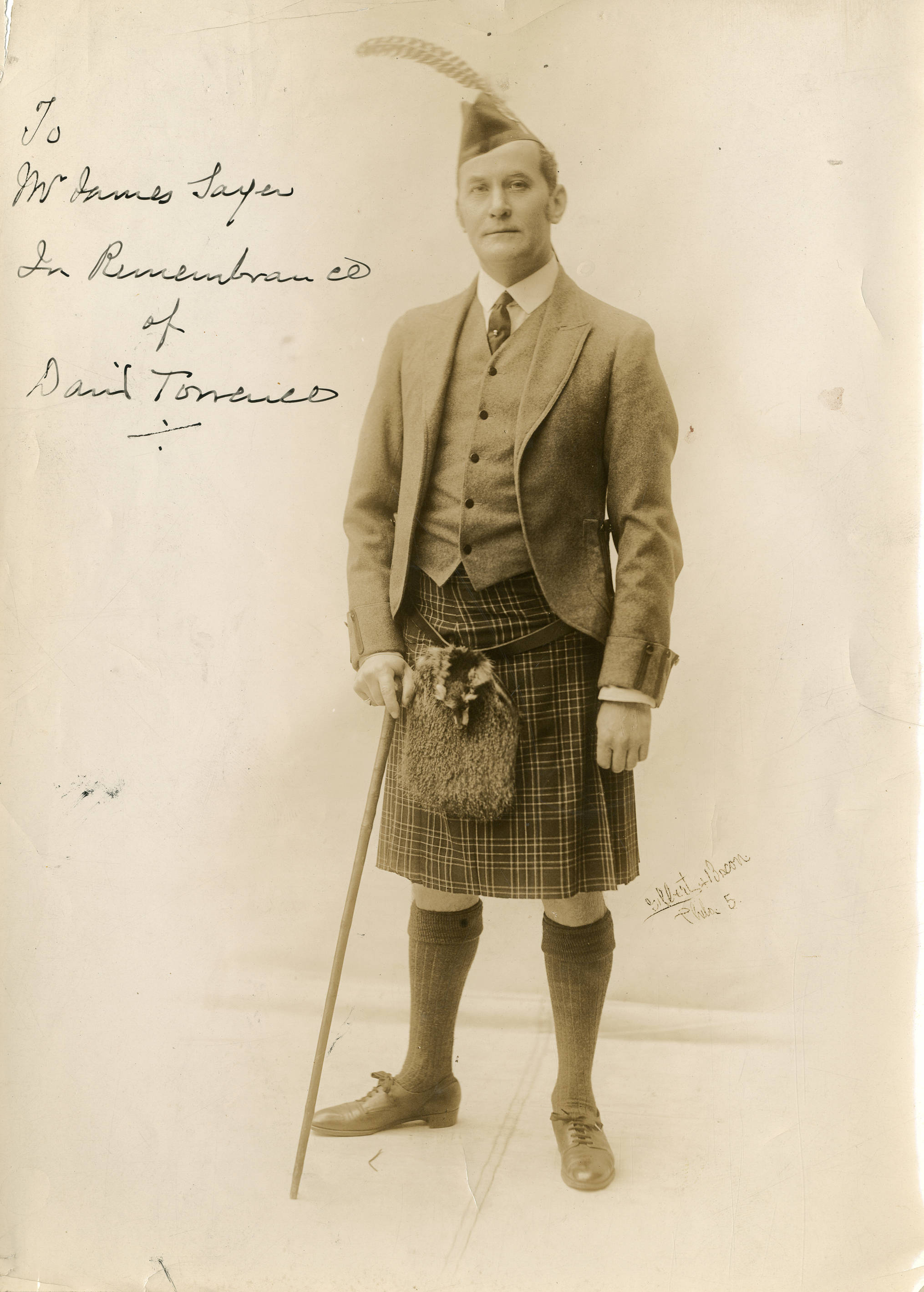
- Torrence in 1912
- Born: David Tayson; 17 January 1864; Edinburgh, Scotland
- Died: 26 December 1951 (aged 87); Los Angeles, California, U.S.
- Burial place: Inglewood Park Cemetery, Inglewood, California, U.S.
- Occupation: Actor
- Years active: 1913–1951
- Relatives: Ernest Torrence (brother)

David Torrence (born David Tayson; 17 January 1864 – 26 December 1951) was a Scottish film actor. He appeared in more than 100 films from 1913 to 1939. He has a star on the Hollywood Walk of Fame. He was the brother of actor Ernest Torrence. He was born in Edinburgh, Scotland and died in Los Angeles.

== Selected filmography ==
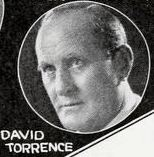
David Torrence from a 1922 ad

- The Prisoner of Zenda (1913) - Michael, Duke of Strelsau
- Tess of the d'Urbervilles (1913) - Alec D'Urberville
- The Inside of the Cup (1921) - Eldon Parr
- Received Payment (1922) - Daniel Milton
- Sherlock Holmes (1922) - Count von Stalburg
- A Virgin's Sacrifice (1922) - David Sherrill
- Tess of the Storm Country (1922) - Elias Graves
- Forsaking All Others (1922) - Mr. Morton
- The Power of a Lie (1922) - John Hammond
- Trimmed in Scarlet (1923) - Charles Knight
- The Abysmal Brute (1923) - Mortimer Sangster
- The Man Next Door (1923) - Colonel Wright
- Railroaded (1923) - Judge Garbin
- The Light That Failed (1923) - Topenhow
- The Drums of Jeopardy (1923) - Cutty
- The Dawn of a Tomorrow (1924) - Sir Oliver Holt
- Which Shall It Be? (1924) - Robert Moore
- Surging Seas (1924) - Lionel Sinclair
- Tiger Love (1924) - Don Miguel Castelar
- The Sawdust Trail (1924) - Jonathan Butts
- Love's Wilderness (1924) - The Governor
- Idle Tongues (1924) - Cyrenus Stone
- He Who Laughs Last (1925) - George K. Taylor
- The Reckless Sex (1925) - Robert Lanning
- Her Husband's Secret (1925) - Ross Brewster
- Fighting the Flames (1925) - Judge Manly
- The Mystic (1925) - James Bradshaw
- What Fools Men (1925) - Williamson
- The Wheel (1925) - Theodore Morton Sr.
- The Tower of Lies (1925) - Eric
- The Other Woman's Story (1925) - Judge
- The Auction Block (1926) - Robert Wharton Sr
- The King of the Turf (1926) - Martyn Selsby
- Oh! What a Nurse! (1926) - Big Tim Harrison
- Sandy (1926) - Angus McNeil
- The Isle of Retribution (1926) - Godfrey Cornet
- Brown of Harvard (1926) - Mr. Brown
- Race Wild (1926)
- The Wolf Hunters (1926) - Le Grange
- Laddie (1926) - Paul Stanton
- The Man in the Shadow (1926) - Robert Rodman
- Forever After (1926) - Mr. Clayton, Jennie's Father
- The Unknown Cavalier (1926) - Peter Gaunt
- The Third Degree (1926) - Howard Jeffries Sr.
- The Midnight Watch (1927) - Chief Callahan
- The Mysterious Rider (1927) - Mark King
- Annie Laurie (1927) - Sir Robert Laurie
- The World at Her Feet (1927) - Client
- Rolled Stockings (1927) - Mr. Treday
- Hazardous Valley (1927)
- On the Stroke of Twelve (1927) - Henry Rutledge
- The Big Noise (1928) - Managing Editor
- The Little Shepherd of Kingdom Come (1928) - General Dean
- Undressed (1928) - Martin Stanley
- The City of Purple Dreams (1928) - Symington Otis
- The Cavalier (1928) - Ramón Torreno
- Silks and Saddles (1929) - Judge Clifford
- Untamed Justice (1929) - George Morrow, Investment Broker
- Strong Boy (1929) - Railroad President
- The Black Watch (1929) - Field Marshal
- Hearts in Exile (1929) - Governor
- Disraeli (1929) - Lord Probert
- City Girl (1930) - Mr. J.L. Tustine
- Raffles (1930) - Inspector McKenzie
- Scotland Yard (1930) - Captain Graves
- River's End (1930) - Inspector McDowell
- The Devil to Pay! (1930) - Mr. Hope
- The Bachelor Father (1931) - Dr. Frank 'Mac' MacDonald
- East Lynne (1931) - Sir Richard Hare
- Five Star Final (1931) - Arthur Weeks (uncredited)
- A Successful Calamity (1932) - Partington
- Smilin' Through (1932) - Gardener (uncredited)
- The Mask of Fu Manchu (1932) - McLeod
- Cavalcade (1933) - Man at Disarmament Conference (uncredited)
- Horse Play (1933) - Uncle Percy
- Voltaire (1933) - Dr. Tronchin
- The Masquerader (1933) - Fraser
- Berkeley Square (1933) - Lord Stanley
- Queen Christina (1933) - Archbishop
- Madame Spy (1934) - Seerfeldt
- Mandalay (1934) - Capt. McAndrews of the Sirohi
- All Men Are Enemies (1934) - Sir Charles Ripton (uncredited)
- Jane Eyre (1934) - Mr. Brocklehurst
- Charlie Chan in London (1934) - Home Secretary
- What Every Woman Knows (1934) - Alick Wylie
- Black Sheep (1935) - Capt. Savage
- Bonnie Scotland (1935) - Mr. Miggs - the Lawyer
- The Dark Angel (1935) - Mr. Shannon (uncredited)
- Harmony Lane (1935) - Mr. Pentland
- Charlie Chan in Shanghai (1935) - Sir Stanley Woodland (uncredited)
- Mutiny on the Bounty (1935) - Lord Hood
- Captain Blood (1935) - Andrew Baynes
- The Country Doctor (1936) - Governor General
- Mary of Scotland (1936) - Lindsay
- Annie Laurie (1936, Short) - Sir Robert Laurie
- Beloved Enemy (1936) - Alroyd
- Lost Horizon (1937) - Prime Minister
- Ebb Tide (1937) - Tapena Tom
- Five of a Kind (1938) - Sir Basil Crawford
- Bulldog Drummond's Bride (1939) - Donald Fenton
- Stanley and Livingstone (1939) - Mr. Cranston
- Rulers of the Sea (1939) - Donald Fenton
