= Senorita (film) =

1927 film directed by Clarence Badger

Señorita
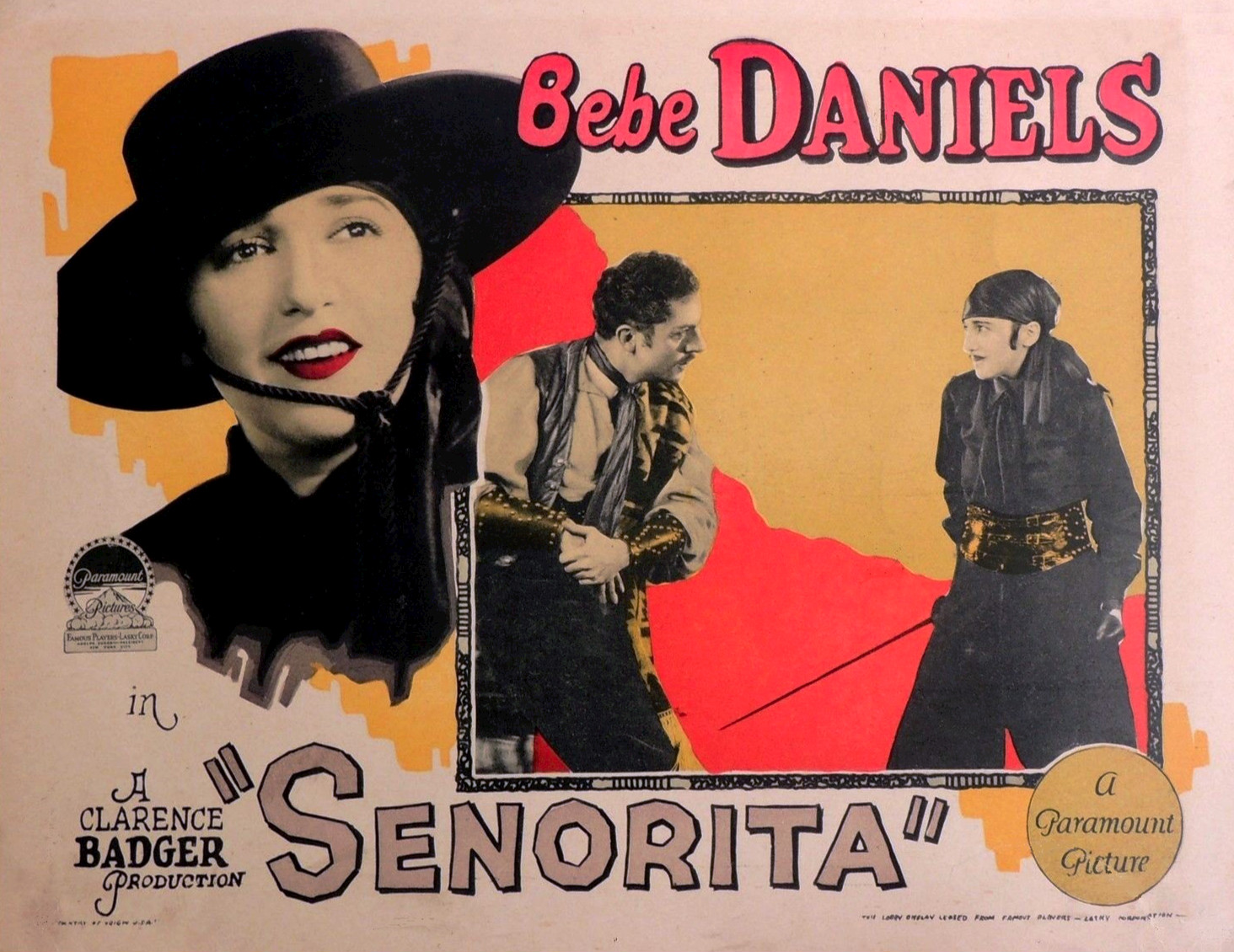
- Lobby card
- Directed by: Clarence Badger
- Written by: Lloyd Corrigan (scenario); Robert Hopkins (intertitles)
- Screenplay by: John McDermott
- Story by: John McDermott
- Produced by: Adolph Zukor; Jesse L. Lasky; B. P. Schulberg (associate producer)
- Starring: Bebe Daniels
- Cinematography: H. Kinley Martin; William Marshall
- Distributed by: Paramount Pictures
- Release date: April 30, 1927
- Running time: 70 minutes
- Country: United States
- Language: Silent (English intertitles)

Señorita is a 1927 American silent action comedy film directed by Clarence Badger and starring Bebe Daniels. A parody of The Mark of Zorro (1920), Bebe Daniels was one of the first actresses to play a female Zorro-like character.

== Cast ==
- Bebe Daniels as Señorita Francesca Hernandez
- James Hall as Roger Oliveros
- William Powell as Ramon or Manuel Oliveros
- Josef Swickard as Don Francisco Hernandez
- Tom Kennedy as Oliveros Gaucho (uncredited)
- Jerry Mandy as Juean, Hernandez Gaucho (uncredited)
- Raoul Paoli as Jose, Hernandez Foreman (uncredited)
- Pedro Regas as Hernandez Gaucho (uncredited)

== Preservation ==
Two prints of the film still exist; one is held in a private collection and another is reportedly in Belgium containing French intertitles.

== See also ==
- Lady Robinhood
- Queen of Swords (TV series)
- The Bandit Queen (film)
- Zorro's Black Whip
