= Evidence (1915 film) =

- Directed by: Edwin August
- Written by: Edwin August (scenario)
- Based on: Evidence by Jean du Rocher MacPherson and L. du Rocher MacPherson
- Produced by: F. Ray Comstock Film Corporation
- Starring: Edwin August; Lillian Tucker; Haidee Wright; Florence Hackett
- Distributed by: World Film Company (William A. Brady)
- Release date: September 20, 1915
- Country: United States
- Language: Silent film (English intertitles)

Evidence is a 1915 silent drama film directed by and starring early film actor Edwin August and released by the World Film Company. It is lost film.

Some or all of the film may have been shot in color as one of the locations was the Kinemacolor Company of America's Studios in Flushing, Queens, New York. The film is based on a Broadway stage play, Evidence, performed in 1914. Actress Haidee Wright reprises her role from the play in this film.

== Cast ==
- Edwin August - Curley Lushington
- Lillian Tucker - Lady Una Wimbourne
- Haidee Wright - Duchess of Gillingham
- Florence Hackett - Mrs. Ebengham
- Richard Temple - Captain Pollock
- Lionel Pape - Bertie Stavely
- Richard Buhler - Lord Cyril Wimbourne
- Maurice Steuart - Abington 'Bing' Wimbourne (*uncredited)
