= The Midnight Watch =

1927 film

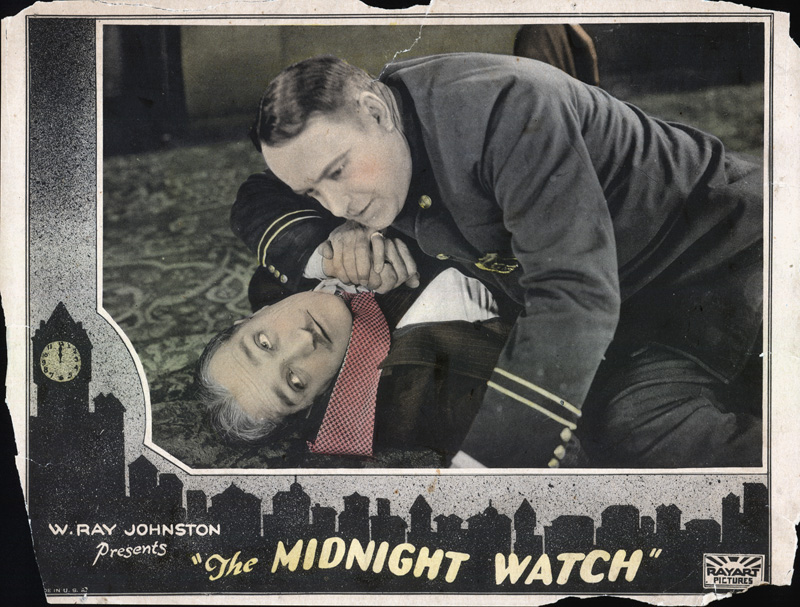
- Directed by: Charles J. Hunt
- Written by: Trem Carr
- Produced by: Trem Carr
- Starring: Roy Stewart; Mary McAllister; David Torrence
- Cinematography: Harold Wenstrom
- Production company: Trem Carr Pictures
- Distributed by: Rayart Pictures
- Release date: February 1927
- Running time: 60 minutes
- Country: United States
- Languages: Silent; English intertitles

The Midnight Watch is a 1927 American silent crime film directed by Charles J. Hunt and starring Roy Stewart, Mary McAllister and David Torrence.

== Cast ==
- Roy Stewart as Bob Breemer
- Mary McAllister as Rose Denton
- David Torrence as Chief Callahan
- Ernest Hilliard
- Marcella Daly

== Bibliography ==
- Ken Wlaschin. Silent Mystery and Detective Movies: A Comprehensive Filmography. McFarland, 2009.
