= The Man in the Shadow =

1926 film

- Directed by: David Hartford
- Written by: Anne Francis; Frances Nordstrom
- Produced by: David Hartford
- Starring: David Torrence; Mary McAllister; Joseph Bennett
- Cinematography: Walter L. Griffin
- Edited by: Walter L. Griffin
- Production company: David Hartford Productions
- Distributed by: American Cinema Association
- Release date: October 15, 1926
- Running time: 60 minutes
- Country: United States
- Languages: Silent; English intertitles

The Man in the Shadow is a 1926 American silent drama film directed by David Hartford and starring David Torrence, Mary McAllister and Joseph Bennett.

== Cast ==
- David Torrence as Robert Rodman
- Mary McAllister as Lucy Rodman
- Arthur Rankin as Bob Rodman
- Joseph Bennett as Dallis Alvoid
- Myrtle Stedman as Mary Alvoid
- John T. Dwyer as Thomas Walsh
- Margaret Fielding as Kate Jackson
- Edward Coxen as Harry Jackson

== Bibliography ==
- Connelly, Robert B. The Silents: Silent Feature Films, 1910-36, Volume 40, Issue 2. December Press, 1998.
- Munden, Kenneth White. The American Film Institute Catalog of Motion Pictures Produced in the United States, Part 1. University of California Press, 1997.
