= Remodeling Her Husband =

1920 film by Lillian Gish

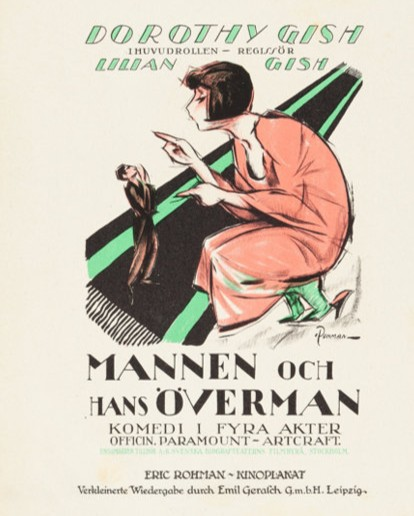
- Swedish theatrical release poster
- Directed by: Lillian Gish
- Written by: Lillian Gish (story and scenario, as Dorothy Elizabeth Carter); Dorothy Parker (intertitles)
- Starring: Dorothy Gish; James Rennie
- Cinematography: George W. Hill
- Production company: Famous Players–Lasky/Artcraft
- Distributed by: Paramount Pictures
- Release date: June 13, 1920 (U.S.)
- Running time: 5 reels (4,844 feet)
- Country: U.S.
- Language: Silent (English intertitles)
- Budget: $50,000
- Box office: over $460,000

Remodeling Her Husband is a 1920 American silent comedy film that marked the only time Lillian Gish directed a film.

D. W. Griffith is stated in some sources as co-director or perhaps had limited input as the production was filmed at his Mamaroneck, New York production facilities. Lillian Gish wrote the story and scenario incognito as Dorothy Elizabeth Carter with Algonquin Round Table writer Dorothy Parker supplying the intertitles. Thus the movie was nearly an all-woman produced movie with the exception of the cameraman.

The film, currently classified as lost, stars Lillian's sister Dorothy Gish and Dorothy's husband at the time James Rennie. George W. Hill, who is the cinematographer, later directed classic films at MGM like Tell It to the Marines (1926) and The Big House (1930).

== Plot ==
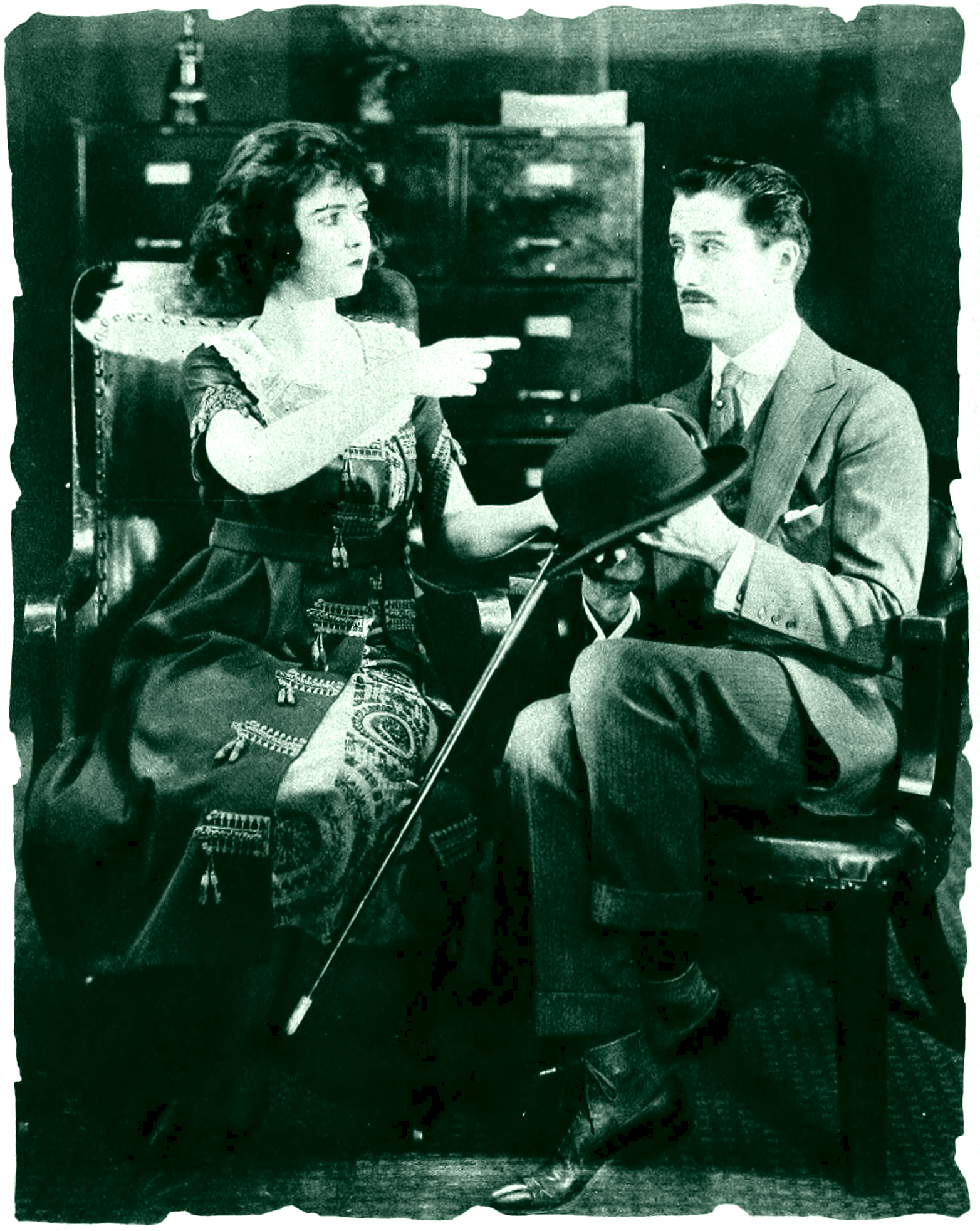
Gish and Rennie in the film

Janie Wakefield marries Jack Valentine, who frequently flirts with other women. Although Jack promises to reform, his attraction to other women continues to cause problems. Early in their marriage, he assists a stylish woman with her suitcase and takes her home. Janie, passing by on a bus, sees the interaction and becomes suspicious. Though Jack manages to explain himself, the incident strains their relationship.

Later, Jack becomes involved with a flirtatious manicurist, further testing Janie's patience. She leaves him and returns to live with her parents, Mrs. Wakefield and Mr. Wakefield, and begins working in her father's office. There, she proves herself capable and begins building a career.

Jack, regretful and still in love with Janie, pleads for forgiveness. She eventually agrees to reconcile but asserts her independence. When Jack tries to reassert control, she firmly has him removed from her office. Threatening suicide in a final act of desperation, Jack finally makes Janie reconsider. She determines to make the relationship work and succeeds in reforming his behavior. Jack becomes a faithful husband, and they reconcile.

== Cast ==
- Dorothy Gish as Janie Wakefield
- James Rennie as Jack Valentine
- Marie Burke as Mrs. Wakefield
- Downing Clarke as Mr. Wakefield
- Frank Kingdon as Mr. Valentine
- Leslie Marsh as flower girl
- Mildred Marsh as bridesmaid
- Barden Daube as flirting woman

== Review ==
Variety published the following review of the film on June 11, 1920 (pp. 33–34):

This feature will be liked by film fans but not particularly because of the story or the picturization of it, but through the exquisite comedy Dorothy Gish offers.

The picture seems to be a real Gish family affair, with Dorothy starring and Lillian directing. Much is made of the latter in a title leader, which sets forth that this day is one where woman is asserting herself in all the arts, and therefore it is time she undertook the direction of pictures.

But Lillian does not qualify as a particularly strong directress in this production. The story may have had something to do with that. It is not a world beater but with the action that Dorothy supplies it gets by with laughs.

James Rennie, who plays opposite the star, is the only member of the supporting cast who seems to have more than a 'bit' to do. The others while acceptable fail to show often enough to get a line on them. It is a picture that is Dorothy Gish, hook, line and sinker, and it would sink if it weren't for her.

== Preservation status ==
Remodeling Her Husband is now considered to be a lost film.

== See also ==
- List of lost films
