= The New Superintendent =

1911 film

- Directed by: Francis Boggs
- Written by: Francis Boggs
- Produced by: William Nicholas Selig
- Starring: Herbert Rawlinson
- Release date: November 16, 1911
- Running time: 10 minutes
- Country: United States
- Language: Silent with English intertitles

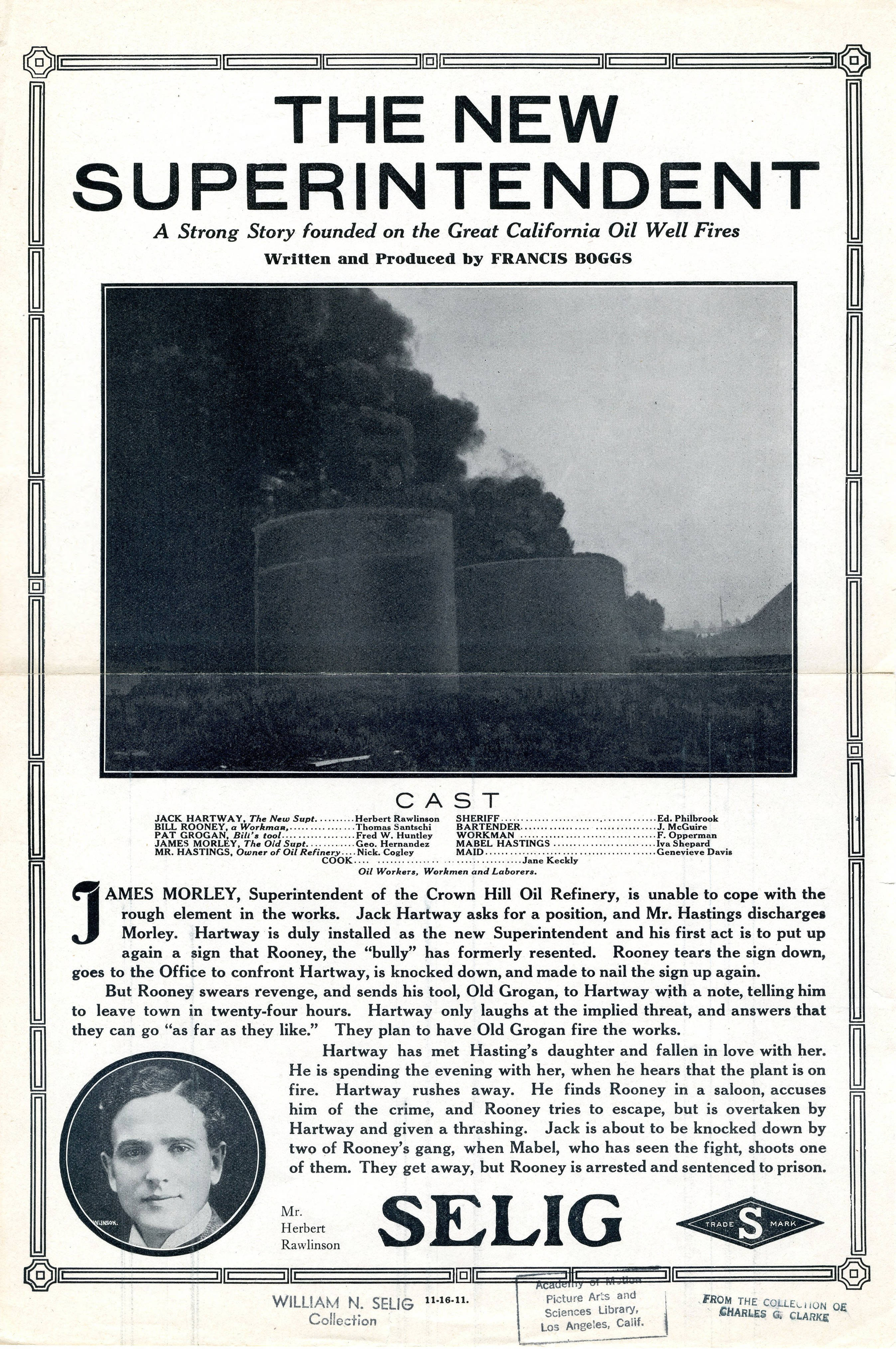
A flyer released to promote the film.

The New Superintendent is a 1911 American short drama film directed by Francis Boggs, featuring Hoot Gibson as an extra.

== Cast ==
- Herbert Rawlinson
- Tom Santschi
- Fred Huntley
- George Hernandez
- Nick Cogley
- Edward H. Philbrook
- Major J.A. McGuire as J. McGuire
- Frank Opperman
- Iva Shepard
- Elaine Davis
- Jane Keckley
- Hoot Gibson as Extra (uncredited)

== See also ==
- Hoot Gibson filmography
