= Robert Hopkins (screenwriter) =

American screenwriter

Robert E. Hopkins
- Born: September 21, 1886; Ottawa, Kansas, U.S.
- Died: December 22, 1966 (aged 80); Hollywood, California, U.S.
- Occupation: Screenwriter
- Years active: 1920s–1930s
- Known for: Academy Award nomination for San Francisco (1936)

Robert E. Hopkins (September 21, 1886 – December 22, 1966) was a screenwriter. He was nominated for the Academy Award for Best Story for the 1936 film San Francisco.

Hopkins was born in Ottawa, Kansas, and died in Hollywood, California, aged 80. According to the book, "The Genius of the System," Hopkins was known for "zingers" and other one liners. Lacking talent in plot construction, he would "literally prowl the lot and supply bits of dialogue as needed. Some writers and producers even penciled 'Hopkins line here' into screenplay drafts, counting on MGM's resident wit for an appropriate ad-lib." He was often uncredited for his work as his work was so incredibly niche and specific only to him. For nearly 2 decades at the MGM studio, he contrived most of the iconic one-liners of their films from the early 1920s and 30s.

== Partial filmography ==
- Old Clothes (1925)
- The Better 'Ole (1926)
- Señorita (1927)
- The Law of the Range (1928)
- Wickedness Preferred (1928)
- The Smart Set (1928)
- Spite Marriage (1929)
- Chasing Rainbows (1930)
- San Francisco (1936)
