= Fire and Steel (film) =

1927 film

- Directed by: Bertram Bracken
- Written by: Barry Barringer
- Produced by: William T. Lackey
- Starring: Jack Perrin; Philo McCullough; Mary McAllister
- Cinematography: Robert E. Cline; Joseph Walker
- Production company: W.T. Lackey Productions
- Distributed by: Ellbee Pictures
- Release date: July 1, 1927
- Country: United States
- Languages: Silent; English intertitles

Fire and Steel is a 1927 American silent action film directed by Bertram Bracken and starring Jack Perrin, Philo McCullough and Mary McAllister.

== Cast ==
- Jack Perrin as Terry O'Farrell
- Philo McCullough as Tom Welbourne
- Mary McAllister as Ann McGreagor
- Burr McIntosh as Sandy McGreagor
- Cissy Fitzgerald as Mary O'Farrell
- Frank Newburg as G.W. Bronson
- Carmencita Johnson as Young Girl

== Bibliography ==
- Munden, Kenneth White. The American Film Institute Catalog of Motion Pictures Produced in the United States, Part 1. University of California Press, 1997.
