= Sadie Goes to Heaven =

1917 silent film

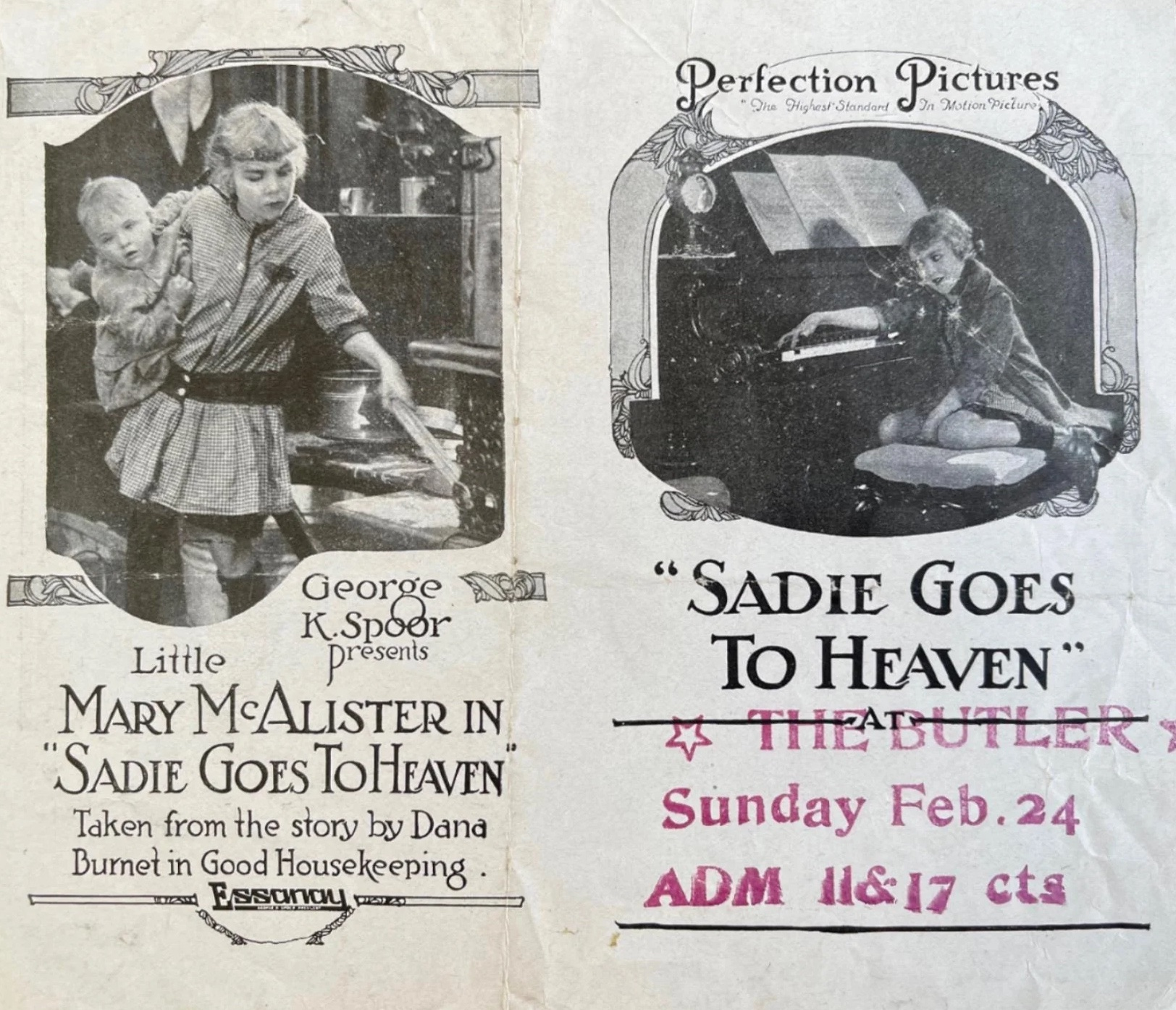
- Pamphlet for film
- Directed by: W.S. Van Dyke
- Written by: Dana Burnet
- Starring: Mary McAllister; Frances Raymond; Rod La Rocque
- Production companies: Perfection Pictures; Essanay Studios
- Distributed by: George Kleine System
- Release date: December 24, 1917
- Running time: 50 minutes
- Country: United States
- Languages: Silent; English intertitles

Sadie Goes to Heaven is a 1917 American silent comedy film directed by W.S. Van Dyke and starring Mary McAllister, Frances Raymond and Rod La Rocque

== Cast ==
- Mary McAllister as Sadie
- Jenny St. George as Sadie's Mother
- Russell McDermott as Orval
- Frances Raymond as Mrs. Welland Riche
- Rod La Rocque as Coal Heaver
- Kathryn Kennedy as Housekeeper
- Robert Bolder as Butler

== Bibliography ==
- Connelly, Robert B. The Silents: Silent Feature Films, 1910-36, Volume 40, Issue 2. December Press, 1998.
