= The Sap (1926 film) =

1926 film by Erle C. Kenton

- Directed by: Erle C. Kenton
- Screenplay by: Edward T. Lowe Jr.
- Story by: Edward T. Lowe Jr. Philip Klein
- Based on: The Sap by William A. Grew
- Starring: Kenneth Harlan; Heinie Conklin; Mary McAllister; David Butler; Eulalie Jensen; John Cossar
- Cinematography: Edwin B. DuPar
- Edited by: Clarence Kolster
- Production company: Warner Bros.
- Distributed by: Warner Bros.
- Release date: March 20, 1926
- Running time: 68 minutes
- Country: United States
- Language: English

The Sap is a 1926 American comedy film directed by Erle C. Kenton and written by Edward T. Lowe Jr. It is based on the 1924 play The Sap by William A. Grew. The film stars Kenneth Harlan, Heinie Conklin, Mary McAllister, David Butler, Eulalie Jensen and John Cossar. The film was released by Warner Bros. on March 20, 1926.

== Plot ==
The titular sap is Barry Weston, a coward who goes off to war unexpectedly fights heroically and is welcomed back to his hometown.

== Cast ==
- Kenneth Harlan as Barry Weston, a coward forced into war who comes home a hero
- Heinie Conklin as Wienie Duke
- Mary McAllister as Janet
- David Butler as Vance
- Eulalie Jensen as Mrs. Weston, Barry's mother
- John Cossar as Janet's Father
