= The Climbers (1915 film) =

1915 film by Barry O'Neil

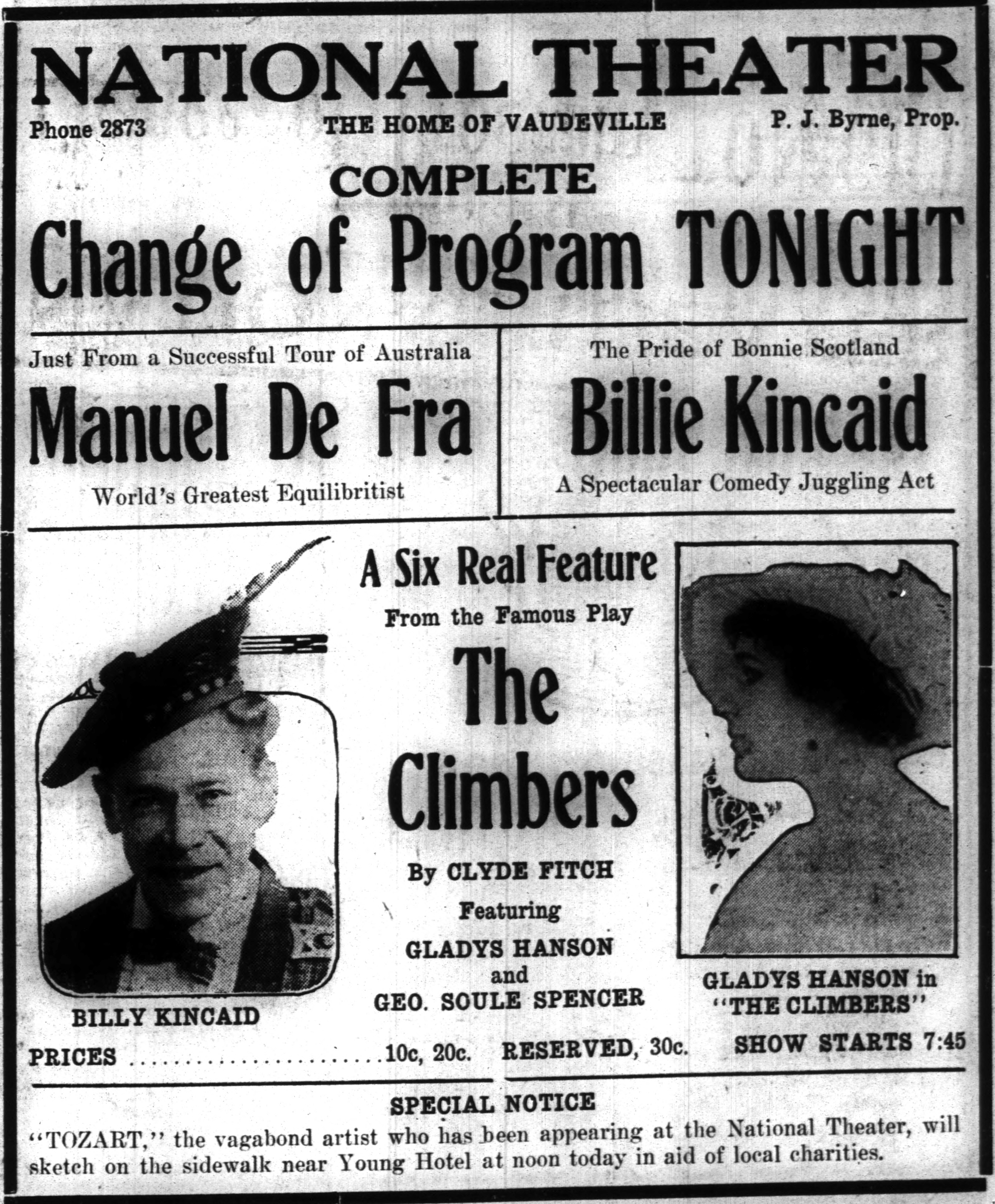
- Contemporary advertisement for the film and an opening juggling act
- Directed by: Barry O'Neil
- Written by: Clay M. Greene (scenario)
- Based on: The Climbers by Clyde Fitch
- Produced by: Sigmund Lubin
- Starring: Gladys Hanson
- Cinematography: Fred Chaston
- Distributed by: V-L-S-E, Incorporated
- Release date: August 2, 1915
- Running time: 5 reels
- Country: USA
- Language: Silent (English intertitles)

The Climbers is a lost 1915 silent film produced by the Lubin Manufacturing Company and starring Gladys Hanson; it is the first filming of Clyde Fitch's 1901 play of the same name. Later versions of Fitch's play were made in 1919 as The Climbers with Corinne Griffith and in 1927 also as The Climbers with Irene Rich.

== Plot ==
In order to keep his social-climbing wife and daughters in the lifestyle they are accustomed to, wealthy George Hunter makes some large investments in the stock market, but the stocks crash and he loses a great deal of money. His wealthy aunt offers to bail the family out, but complications ensue.

== Cast ==
- Gladys Hanson - Blanche Sterling
- Walter Hitchcock - Dick Sterling
- Dorothy DeWolfe - Richard Sterling Jr
- Charles Brandt - John Hunter
- George Soule Spencer - Ned Warden
- Eleanor Barry - Mrs. Hunter
- Ruth Bryan - Clara Hunter
- Frankie Mann - Jessie Hunter
- Edith Ritchie - Ruth Hunter
- Clarence Elmer - Mr. Trotter (*Clarence Jay Elmer)
- John Smiley - Dr. Steinhart
- Peter Lang - Mr. Mason
- Alan Quinn - Mr. Godesby
- Ferdinand Tidmarsh - Mr. Walton
- Walter Law - Mr. Ryder
- Betty Brice as Miss Godesby
- William H. Turner as Head Clerk
- George Clarke as Jordan (the butler)
