= The Sergeant (1910 film) =

1910 film

- Directed by: Francis Boggs
- Written by: Hobart Bosworth
- Produced by: Francis Boggs; William Nicholas Selig
- Starring: Hobart Bosworth; Iva Shepard
- Cinematography: John Dored
- Production company: Selig Polyscope Company
- Release date: September 22, 1910
- Running time: One reel
- Country: United States
- Languages: Silent; English intertitles

The Sergeant is a 1910 American silent Western film directed and produced by Francis Boggs. It was written by and starred Hobart Bosworth. The film was shot on location in what was later to become Yosemite National Park in California.

The Sergeant was part of a group of 75 early American films found in New Zealand in 2010. The film was preserved by the Academy Film Archive in 2012.

== Director ==
Film director Francis Boggs was born on 1 January 1870 in Santa Rosa and died in Los Angeles on 27 October 1911. He was most productive in 1907 and has at least 10 films that are considered world-renowned.

== Cast ==
- Hobart Bosworth as Sergeant Robert Adams
- Iva Shepard as Colonel Westley's Daughter
- Tom Santschi as Soldier
- Frank Clark as Soldier
- Art Acord as Indian Scout
