= Mary McAllister =

American actress

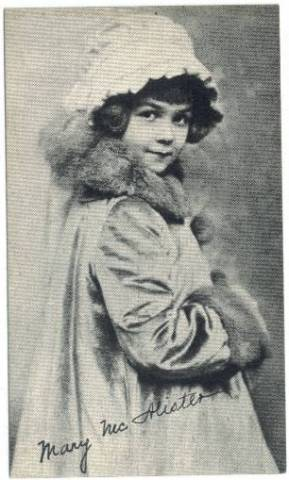
- Born: Mary McAlister; May 27, 1908; Los Angeles, California, U.S.
- Died: May 1, 1991 (aged 82); Del Mar, California, U.S.
- Years active: 1915-1930

Mary McAllister, also known as Little Mary McAllister, (born Mary McAlister; May 27, 1908 – May 1, 1991) was an American silent film actress of Hollywood's early years, and a pioneer of child actors.

== Biography ==
McAllister was born in Los Angeles, California, and started her acting career at the early age of 6, starring opposite Edna Mayo and William Burns in the 1915 film Despair. As a child actor she would star in thirty six films by the time she reached the age of 18. Her best known film during that time would be her lead role in Sadie Goes to Heaven, which also starred Russell McDermott and Jenny St. George, which was St. George's first and only film role. In 1927 she was one of thirteen girls selected as "WAMPAS Baby Stars", alongside Sally Phipps, Martha Sleeper and Frances Lee, among others.

The following year, in 1928, she would star in four films, the last of which would be Loves of an Actress, starring Rudolph Valentino's former lover Pola Negri. In 1929 her career took a downward turn, and she had no roles that year. With the advent of "talking films", her transition was not successful. She had a minor supporting role in the 1930 film On the Level, starring Victor McLaglen, and that same year she had an uncredited role in Madam Satan, which would be her last. After fifteen years in the business as an actress and a total of 43 films to her credit, her career was over at the age of 21. She eventually settled in Del Mar, California, where she was living at the time of her death on May 1, 1991, aged 82.

== Selected filmography ==
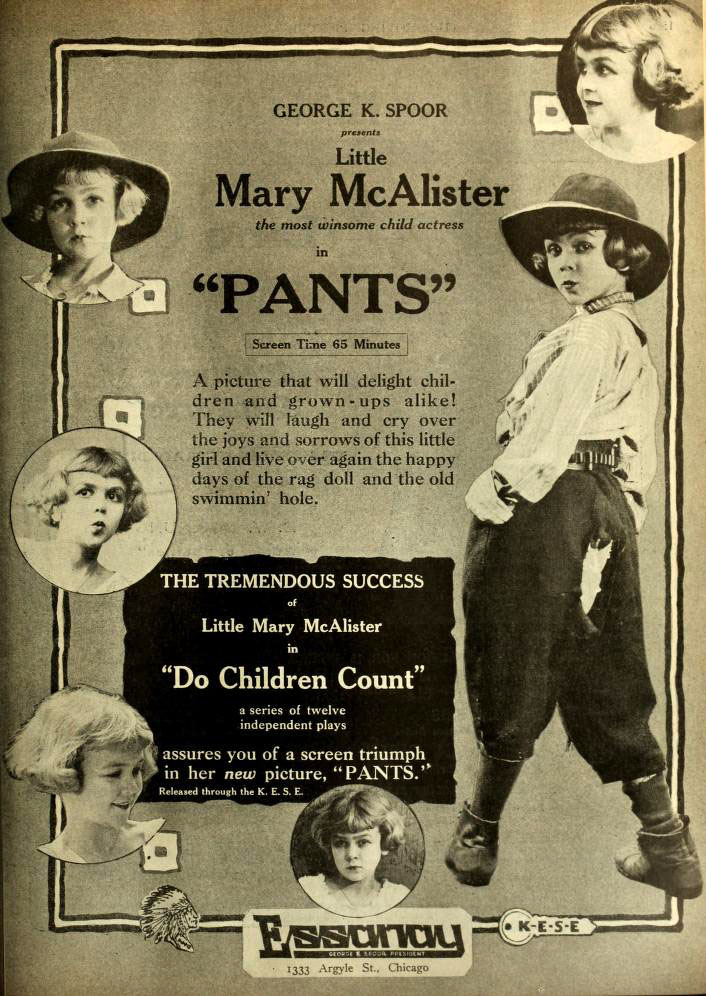
Pants (1917)

- On Trial (1917)
- The Little Missionary (1917)
- Young Mother Hubbard (1917)
- The Kill-Joy (1917)
- Sadie Goes to Heaven (1917)
- Half a Chance (1920)
- Ashes of Vengeance (1923)
- The Measure of a Man (1924)
- A Roaring Adventure (1925)
- The Boomerang (1925)
- The Red Rider (1925)
- Ace of Spades (1925)
- The Sap (1926)
- The Waning Sex (1926)
- One Minute to Play (1926)
- The Man in the Shadow (1926)
- The Midnight Watch (1927)
- Fire and Steel (1927)
- Singed (1927)
- Wickedness Preferred (1928)
- The Devil's Skipper (1928)
- Into No Man's Land (1928)
- Loves of an Actress (1928)
- On the Level (1930)
- Madam Satan (1930)
