= The Stealers =

1920 film by Christy Cabanne

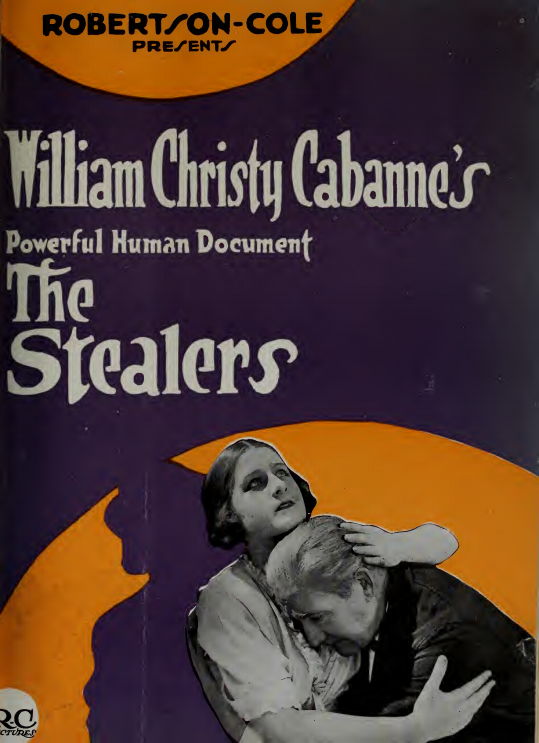
- Advertisement
- Directed by: Christy Cabanne
- Written by: Christy Cabanne
- Cinematography: Georges Benoît
- Production company: Robertson-Cole Pictures Corporation
- Distributed by: Robertson-Cole Pictures Corporation
- Release date: October 3, 1920
- Running time: 7 reels
- Country: United States
- Language: Silent (English intertitles)

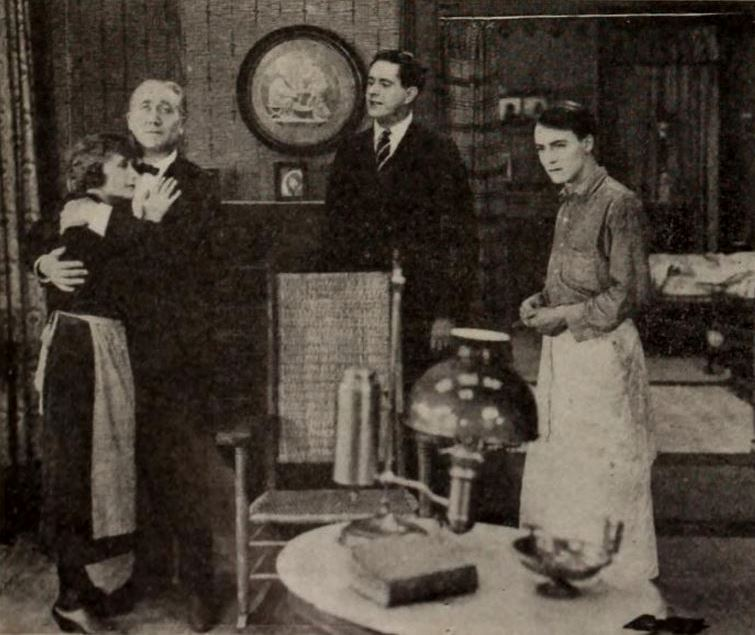
Scene from The Stealers (1920)

The Stealers is a 1920 American silent drama film directed by Christy Cabanne.

== Plot ==
As described in a film magazine, Rev. Robert Martin (Tooker) is an ex-minister who has lost his faith because of his wife's faithlessness, and taken up a life of crime as head of a band of pickpockets masquerading as religious workers who ply their trade in the wake of a traveling carnival company. He tries to keep the true nature of his work secret from his daughter Julie (Shearer), but she learns the truth while traveling with his band for a week. One by one the members of the band are regenerated through a renewal of their faith. Stephen Gregory (Miller), the last of the band to find solace in faith, tries upon a wager to induce his friend Mary Forrest (Dwyer) to leave the man she married while he is under arrest and to go with him.

== Cast ==
- William H. Tooker as Rev. Robert Martin
- Robert Kenyon as Robert Martin (while a young man)
- Myrtle Morse as Mrs. Martin
- Norma Shearer as Julie Martin
- Ruth Dwyer as Mary Forrest
- Eugene Borden as Sam Gregory
- Jack Crosby as Raymond Pritchard
- Matthew Betz as Bert Robinson
- John B. O'Brien as Man of Dawn
- Downing Clarke as Major Wellington
- Walter Miller as Stephen Gregory

== Bibliography ==
- Jack Jacobs and Myron Braum. The Films of Norma Shearer. A. S. Barnes, 1976.
