= A Roaring Adventure =

1925 film

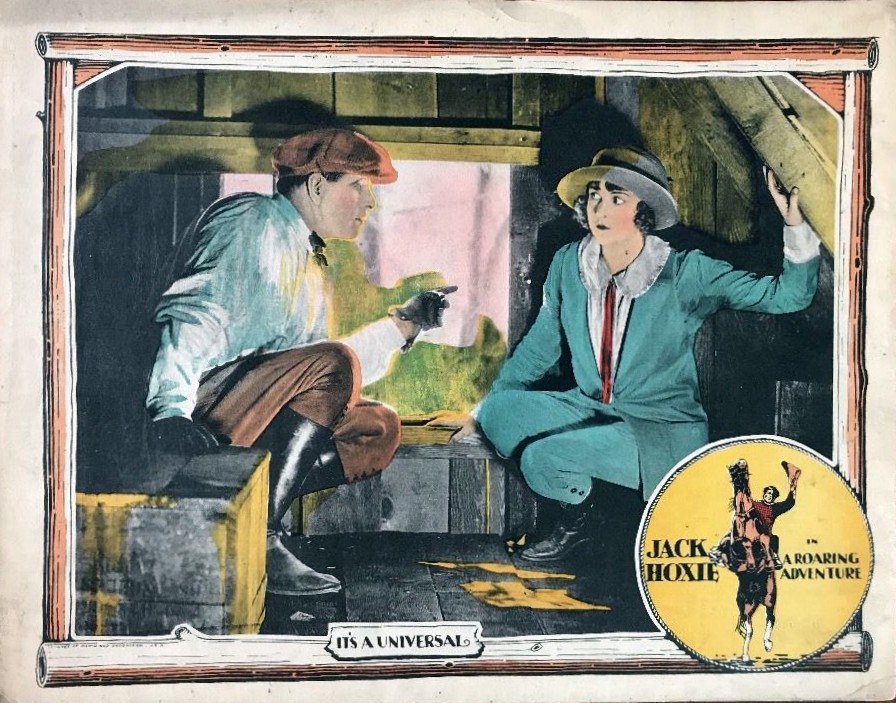
- Lobby card
- Directed by: Clifford Smith
- Written by: Isadore Bernstein; Percy Heath
- Based on: "The Tenderfoot" by Jack Rollens
- Starring: Jack Hoxie; Mary McAllister; Marin Sais
- Cinematography: Harry Neumann
- Production company: Universal Pictures
- Distributed by: Universal Pictures
- Release date: February 8, 1925
- Running time: 50 minutes
- Country: United States
- Languages: Silent; English intertitles

A Roaring Adventure is a 1925 American silent Western film directed by Clifford Smith and starring Jack Hoxie, Mary McAllister and Marin Sais.

== Plot ==
As described in a review in a film magazine, Duffy Burns, easterner since college days, visits his father in the cattle country and learns that rustlers are depleting the stock. He obtains employment on his father's ranch without disclosing his identity, and falls in love with Gloria Carpenter, daughter of one of the thieves. In league with him is Katherine Dodd, a widow he has befriended, and Gloria cannot understand their friendship. Duffy and a sheriff's posse frustrate the thieves attempt to "clean up," Gloria's father reforms, and Duffy wins the affections of the young woman.

== Cast ==
- Jack Hoxie as Duffy Burns
- Mary McAllister as Gloria Carpenter
- Marin Sais as Katherine Dodd
- J. Gordon Russell as Robert Carpenter
- Jack Pratt as Brute Kilroy
- Francis Ford as Colonel Burns / Bennett Hardy
- Margaret Smith as Kitty Dodd (age 5)

== Preservation ==
With no prints of A Roaring Adventure located in any film archives, it is a lost film.

== Bibliography ==
- Munden, Kenneth White. The American Film Institute Catalog of Motion Pictures Produced in the United States, Part 1. University of California Press, 1997.
