= The Rights of Man: A Story of War's Red Blotch =

1915 film directed by Jack Pratt

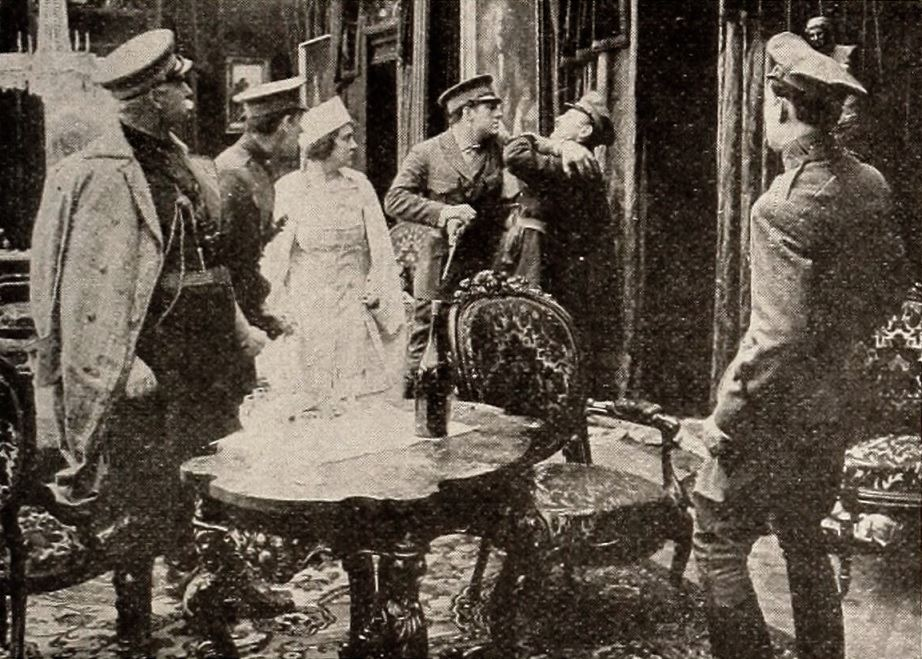
- Directed by: Jack Pratt
- Written by: Louis Reeves Harrison
- Starring: George Clark; Richard Buhler; Rosetta Brice
- Cinematography: Fred Chaston
- Production company: Lubin Manufacturing Company
- Distributed by: V-L-S-E
- Release date: October 25, 1915 (US)
- Running time: Five reels
- Country: United States
- Language: English

The Rights of Man: A Story of War's Red Blotch is a 1915 American silent drama film directed by Jack Pratt, with titles by Louis Reeves Harrison. The film stars George Clark, Richard Buhler, and Rosetta Brice.

== Cast ==
- George Clarke as Prince Sigismund
- Richard Buhler as Dr. Carew
- Rosetta Brice as Princess Lorha
- Francis Joyner as His Royal Highness
- Charles Brandt as General Brun
- Walter Law as American ambassador
- Florence Williams as His wife
- Margaret Moore as Red Cross nurse
- Marie Sterling as Lady of the court
- Clara Lambert as Another lady of the court
- Richard Wangemann as Johann
- Bernard Siegel as Karl
- William Carr as Frederich
- George Bliss as Peasant
