= Jack Pratt =

Canadian actor and screenwriter

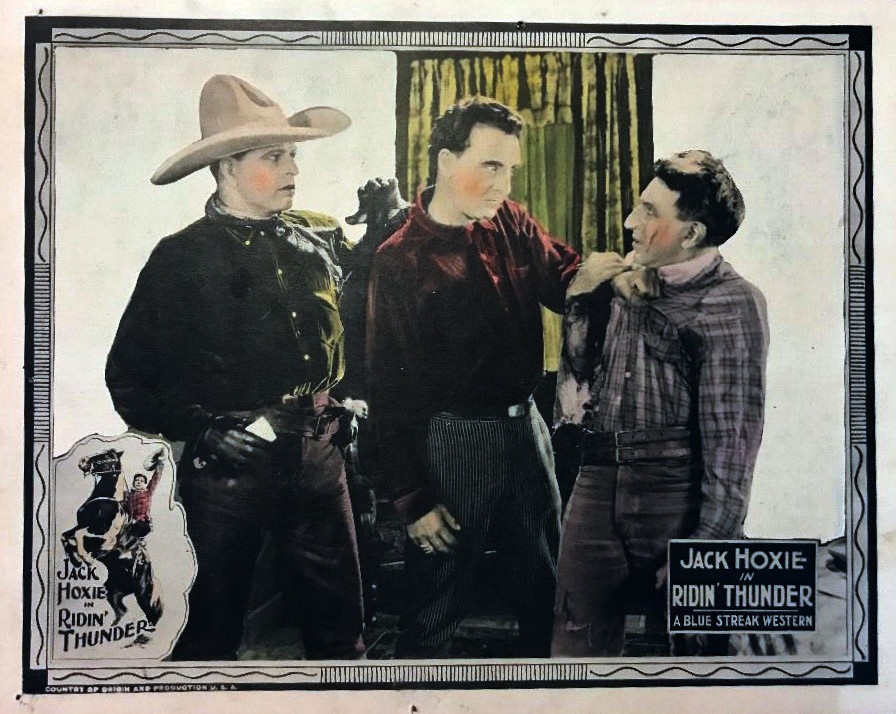
Ridin Thunder lobby card

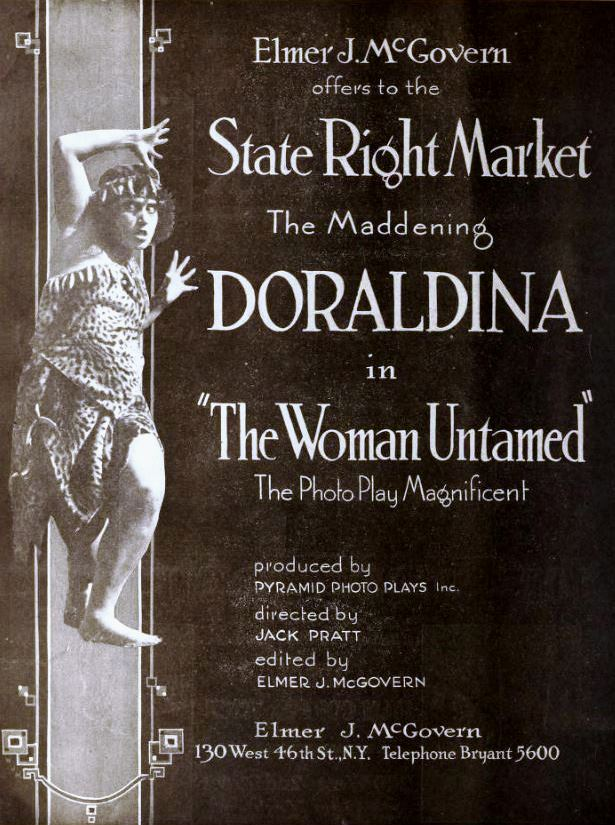
Advertisement for The Woman Untamed

Jack Pratt, born John Harold Pratt, (1878–1938) was a Canadian film director and actor. He directed several films and acted in dozens more. As a director, his work included screen adaptations of novels.

Known as Smiling Jack, he married actress Betty Brice. She starred in the 1916 film Her Bleeding Heart he directed and was also in the film Gods of Fate.

He was hired by Lubin as a director in 1915. He served as President of the Lubin Benefit Association, associated with Lubin Manufacturing Company.

== Filmography ==
=== Director ===
- The Little Pirate (1913)
- Shore Acres (1914)
- The Jungle (1914), one of the directors of an adaptation of Upton Sinclair's 1906 novel
- The Garden of Lies (1915)
- The Rights of Man: a Story of War's Red Blotch (1915)
- The Gods of Fate (1916)
- Her Bleeding Heart (1916)
- The Woman Untamed (1920)
- The Heart of a Woman (1920)
- Roman Candles (1920)

=== Actor ===
- Dan (1914), as Stonewall Jackson
- Ridin Thunder
- Bright Skies
- The Little Wanderer (1920) as Tully
- Hush (1921)
- Back to Yellow Jacket (1922) as William Carson
- The Lone Hand (1922), as Jack Maltrain
- The Western Wallop (1924), as Convict Leader
- The Iron Man (1924), a serial
- A Roaring Adventure (1925) as Brute Kilroy
- The Sign of the Cactus (1925), as Sheriff
- The Wild Horse Stampede (1925), as Henchman
- Ace of Spades (1925)
- Ridin' Thunder (1925)
- The Red Rider (1925)
- The House Without a Key (1926), a serial, as James Egan
- Hawk of the Hills (1927), a serial, as Colonel Jennings
- The Western Whirlwind (1927)
- Rough and Ready (1927) as Parson Smith
- Wild Beauty (1927) as Davis
- Heart Trouble (1928), as Army Captain Bob Reeves
- The Desert Song (1929), as Pasha
- Between Fighting Men (1932), as Sheriff Gorman
