= The Straight Road =

1914 film by Allan Dwan

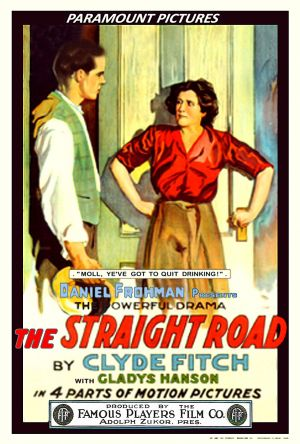
- Theatrical release poster
- Directed by: Allan Dwan
- Screenplay by: Clyde Fitch (play)
- Produced by: Daniel Frohman
- Starring: Gladys Hanson; William Russell; Iva Shepard; Arthur Hoops; Lorraine Huling
- Production company: Famous Players Film Company
- Distributed by: Paramount Pictures
- Release date: November 12, 1914
- Country: United States
- Language: Silent (English intertitles)

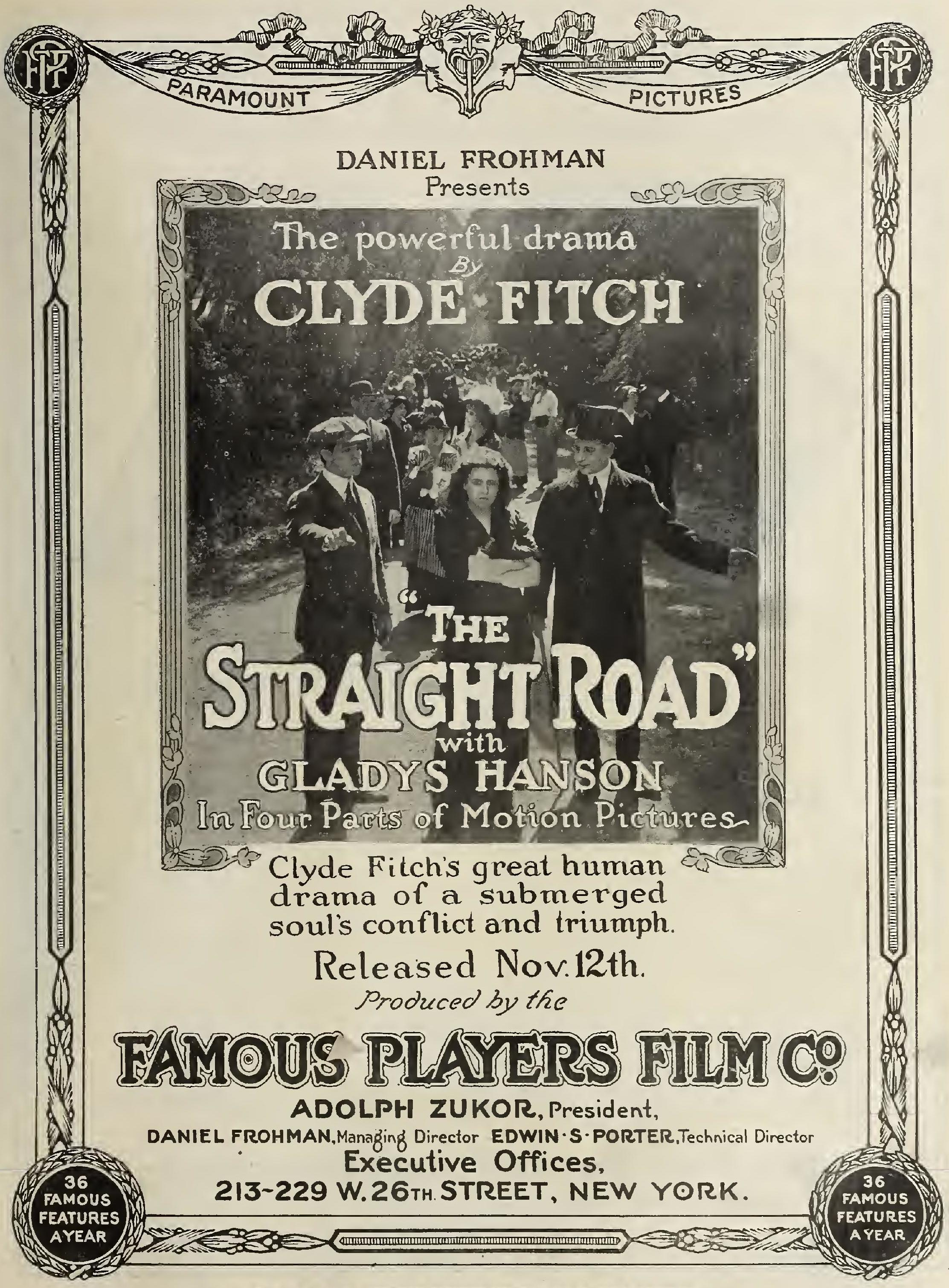
The Straight Road 1914 ad in Motion Picture News

The Straight Road is a 1914 American silent drama film based upon the play by Clyde Fitch, directed by Allan Dwan, and starring Gladys Hanson, William Russell, Iva Shepard, Arthur Hoops and Lorraine Huling. It was released on November 12, 1914, by Paramount Pictures.

== Cast ==
- Gladys Hanson as Mary 'Moll' O'Hara
- William Russell as Bill Hubbell
- Iva Shepard as Lazy Liz
- Arthur Hoops as Douglas Aines
- Lorraine Huling as Ruth Thompson

== Preservation status ==
- The film is preserved in the Library of Congress collection Packard Campus for Audio-Visual Conservation.
