= The Climbers (play) =

1901 play by Clyde Fitch

A program

The Climbers is an American play in four acts by Clyde Fitch. The play premiered on Broadway at the Bijou Theatre on January 21, 1901. It ran for 163 performances, closing on June 1, 1901. Produced by Amelia Bingham, the production was directed by the playwright. It used scenic designs by Ernest Albert and Joseph A. Physioc. The production starred Bingham as Mrs. Sterling, Frank Worthing as Richard Sterling, Harry Wright as Richard Sterling, Jr., Clara Bloodgood as Miss Godesby, George C. Boniface as Dr. Steinart, Madge Carr Cook as Mrs. Hunter, Minnie Dupree as Clara Hunter, Maude Monroe as Jessica Hunter, Robert Edeson as Edward Warden, Ferdinand Gottschalk as Johnny Trotter, Henry Woodruff as Edward Warden, Thomas F. Fallon as Godesby, and John Flood as Frederick Mason.

The play, unlike most of Fitch's works, was not intended for any particular actors. It was a struggle to find someone willing to produce it. However, once a producer was found in Amelia Bingham, she allowed Fitch great creative freedom, which proved a wise decision. Clara Bloodgood's acting was praised in rave reviews on opening, as was that of Frank Worthing. A reporter for the Evening Sun said, "The Climbers is so perfect in all its details that it establishes a new precedent in the matter of stage settings." Ornate furnishings, antique furniture, lit candles, and multicolored three-dimensional trim are just a few aspects of this luxurious set.

The Climbers had its United Kingdom debut on September 5, 1903, at the Comedy Theatre in London's West End. The cast included Sydney Valentine as Richard Sterling, Lottie Venne as Blanche Sterling, Rivers Bertram as Richard Sterling, Jr., H. Reeves-Smith as Edward Warden, Maidie Andrews as Mrs. Hunter, Lily Hanbury as Jessica Hunter, Fannie Ward as Ruth Hunter, J. L. Mackay as Johnny Trotter, G. M. Graham as Dr. Steinart, Howard Sturges as Godesby, and Gertrude Mouillot as Miss Godesby.

The Climbers was revived by Bingham on Broadway at the Princess Theatre in 1904. The play was adapted into a film three times, The Climbers (1915 film), directed by Barry O'Neil; The Climbers (1919 film), directed by Tom Terriss; and The Climbers (1927 film), directed by Paul L. Stein.

The play was parodied in the 1901 Broadway musical The King's Carnival.
