= Iva Shepard =

American actress

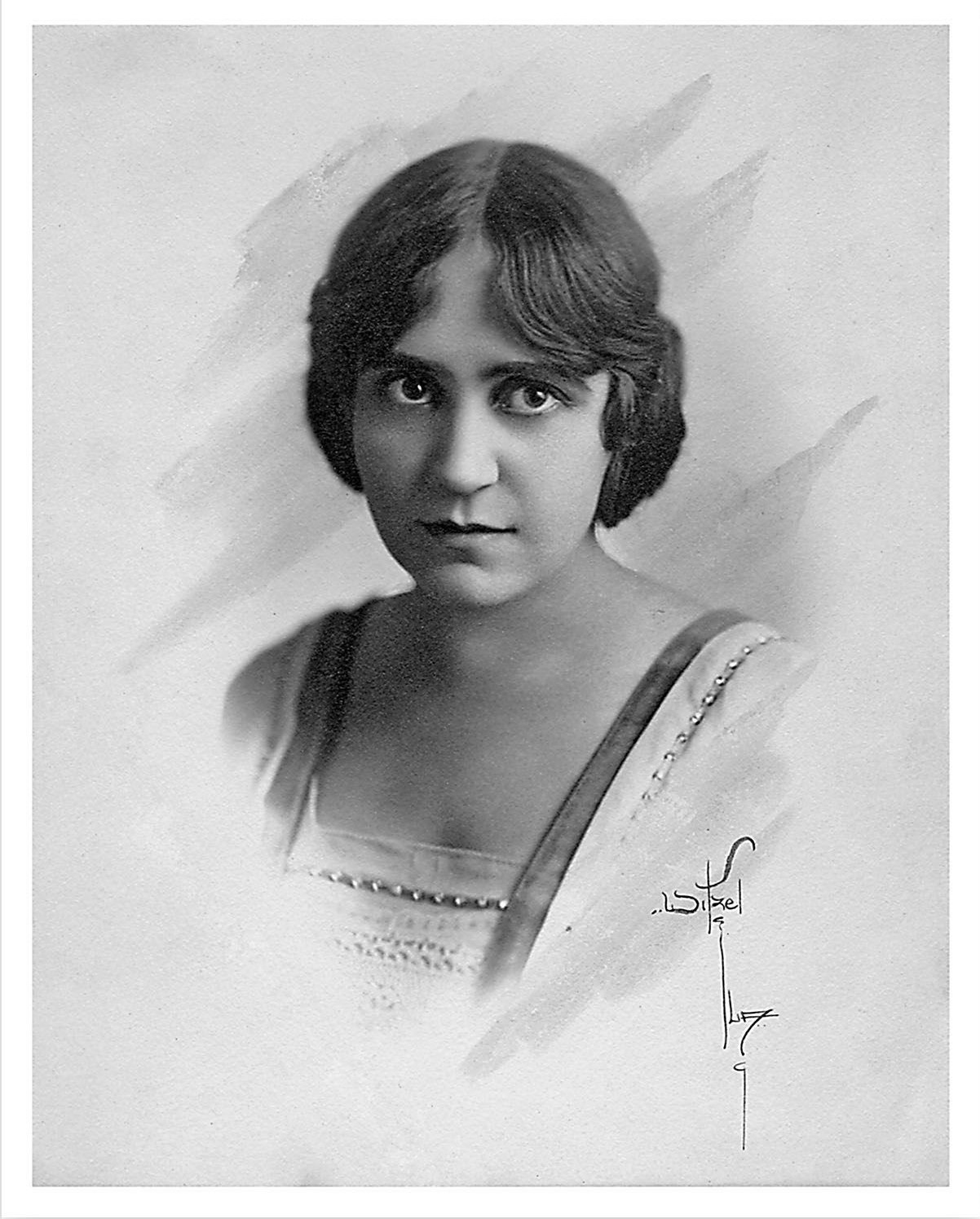
- Born: April 23, 1886; Cincinnati, Ohio
- Died: January 26, 1973 (aged 86); Arcadia, California
- Occupation: Actress
- Years active: 1910–1955

Iva Shepard (April 23, 1886, Cincinnati, Ohio – January 26, 1973, Arcadia, California) was an American silent film actress. Her most notable film roles were in The Romance of an Actor (1914) and as Zoe Trevor in The Haunted Manor (1916) and as Nettie Lea in The Isle of Love (1916).

Late in her career, she made guest appearances in two 1955 episodes of the hit TV show I Love Lucy: "Nursery School" and "Don Juan and the Starlets", as a nurse and maid, respectively. These two roles provided fans who remembered her a chance to hear her voice for what may have been the first time, since she did not appear in films after 1918.

== Partial filmography ==
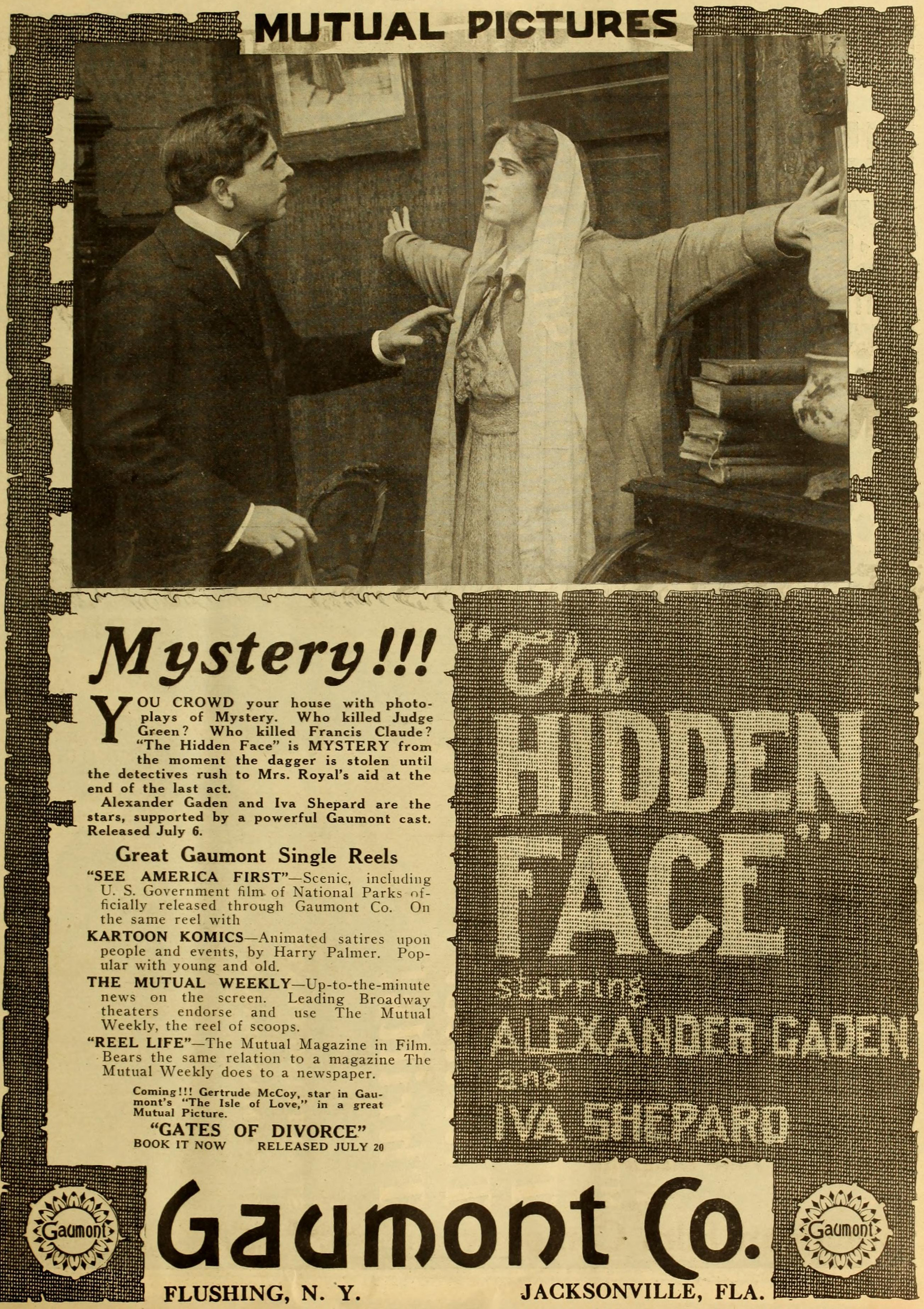
The Hidden Face (1916)

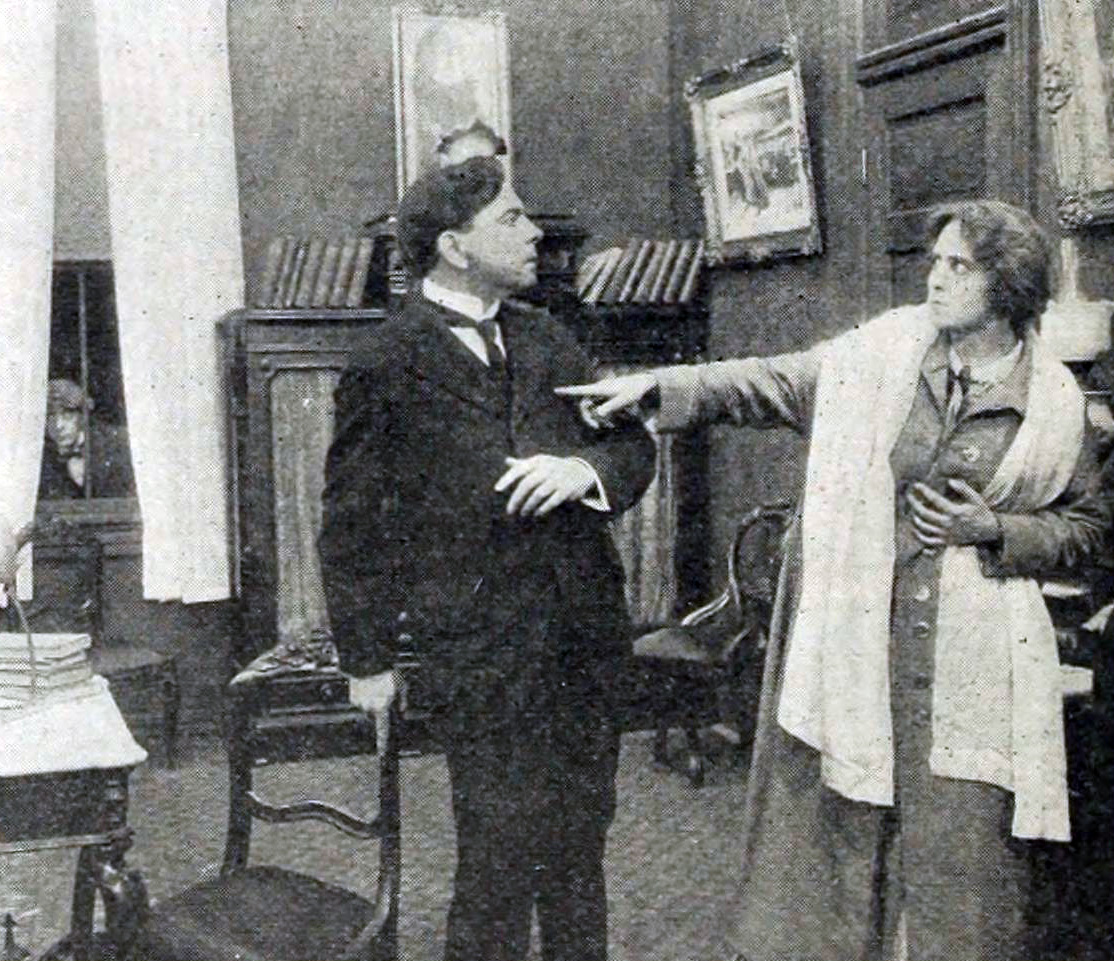
The Hidden Face (1916)

- The Street of Seven Stars (1918) .... Le Grande
- The Isle of Love (1916) .... Nettie Lea
- The Haunted Manor (1916) .... Zoe Trevor
- I Accuse (1916) .... Alice Ward
- The Scarlet Road (1916) .... Mrs. Holbrook
- The Drifter (1916) .... Madge
- The Salamander (1916) .... Beatrice Snyder
- Bondwomen (1915) .... Belle Jordan
- The Suburban (1915) .... Alice Gordon
- His Wife's Past (1915)
- The Conspiracy (1914) (as Iva Shepherd) .... Juanita
- The Thief (1914) (as Ivy Shepherd) .... Mrs. Legardes
- The Straight Road (1914) .... Lazy Liz
- Captain Swift (1914) (as Iva Shepherd) .... Mrs. Seabrook, mother of Swift
- Northern Lights (1914) .... Florence Dunbar
- The Two Gun Man (1914)
- The Romance of an Actor (1914)
- Hand That Rules the World (1914)
- Withered Hands (1914)
- Into the Lion's Pit (1914)
- Coincidental Bridegroom (1914)
- Trust Begets Trust (1914)
- The Imp Abroad (1914)
- The Unhappy Pair (1913)
- His Own Blood (1913) .... Frank's Wife
- A Seaside Samaritan (1913)
- A Stolen Identity (1913)
- The Fight Against Evil (1913)
- Uncle Tom's Cabin (1913/I)
- While the Children Slept (1913) .... Mrs. Reid
- A Woman's Folly (1913) .... Mrs. Saunders, the Hostess
- In Slavery Days (1913)
- A Friend of the Family (1913)
- The Shrinking Rawhide (1912)
- A Broken Spur (1912)
- A Mysterious Gallant (1912)
- The Little Stowaway (1912)
- The Bandit's Mask (1912)
- A Diplomat Interrupted (1912)
- The Other Fellow (1912)
- For His Pal's Sake (1911)
- The Right Name, But the Wrong Man (1911)
- Blackbeard (1911)
- The Convent of San Clemente (1911)
- The New Superintendent (1911)
- The Coquette (1911)
- Little Injin (1911)
- On Separate Paths (1911)
- The Rival Stage Lines (1911)
- A Cup of Cold Water (1911)
- It Happened in the West (1911)
- The Craven Heart (1911)
- The Novice (1911)
- Stability vs. Nobility (1911)
- The Sergeant (1910)
- Hugo the Hunchback (1910)
- The Wife of Marcus (1910)
