= The Red Rider (1925 film) =

1925 film

- Still from the film
- Directed by: Clifford Smith
- Starring: Jack Hoxie; Mary McAllister; Jack Pratt
- Cinematography: Harry Neumann
- Production company: Universal Pictures
- Distributed by: Universal Pictures
- Release date: August 2, 1925
- Running time: 5 reels
- Country: United States
- Languages: Silent; English intertitles

The Red Rider is a 1925 American silent Western film directed by Clifford Smith. It is not known whether the film currently survives.

== Plot ==
Indian chief White Elk prevents Chief Black Panther from looting a train. He is engaged to an Indian princess but falls in love with a white girl. White Elk gets tricked into signing away his tribe's lands, and is also nearly murdered in the process, but he escapes. He is told that he is not Indian, but rather a white person who was adopted by Native Americans. The white girl White Elk is in love with is kidnapped by Indians, and placed into a canoe that is to go over a waterfall. White Elk saves her, and the Indian princess sacrifices herself in the process. White Elk and the white girl then decide to marry.

== Cast ==
- Jack Hoxie as White Elk
- Mary McAllister as Lucy Cavanaugh
- Jack Pratt as Black Panther
- Natalie Warfield as Nautauka
- Marin Sais as Silver Waters
- William McCall as John Cavanaugh
- Francis Ford as Brown Bear
- George Connors as Tom Fleming
- William Welsh as Ben Hanfer
- Clark Comstock as Indian Chief
