= Her Bleeding Heart =

- Directed by: Jack Pratt
- Written by: Daniel Carson Goodman
- Produced by: Siegmund Lubin
- Starring: Betty Brice; Richard Buhler; Crauford Kent
- Distributed by: V-L-S-E
- Release date: February 18, 1916
- Running time: 5 reels
- Country: USA
- Language: Silent..English titles

Her Bleeding Heart is a lost 1916 silent film drama directed by Jack Pratt and produced by the Lubin Manufacturing Company, Philadelphia.

== Cast ==
- Betty Brice - Marion Lane (*as Rosetta Brice)
- Richard Buhler - Dr. George Page
- Crauford Kent - Allen Craven
- Inez Buck - Lucy Mallory
- Karva Poloskova - Sonia Crator
- William H. Turner - Mr. Lane (*as William Turner)
- Mary Carr - Mrs. Lane (*as Mrs. Carr)
