= The Evangelist (1916 film) =

1916 American silent film

- Directed by: Barry O'Neil
- Written by: Clay M. Greene
- Based on: The Evangelist by Henry Arthur Jones
- Produced by: Siegmund Lubin
- Starring: Gladys Hanson; Walter Law
- Production company: Lubin Manufacturing Company
- Distributed by: General Film Company
- Release date: January 17, 1916
- Running time: 6 reels
- Country: United States
- Language: Silent (English intertitles)

The Evangelist is a 1916 American silent drama film directed by Barry O'Neil based on the play by Henry Arthur Jones. It stars Gladys Hanson and Walter Law.

== Cast ==
- Gladys Hanson as Christabel Nuneham
- Walter Law as Sir James Nuneham
- Ferdinand Tidmarsh as Philip Nuneham
- George Soule Spencer as Sylvanus Rebbings
- Jack Standing as Rex Allen
- George Clarke as The Bishop of Trentistown
- Peter Lang as The Rev. Joseph Cushway
- Arthur Matthews as Deacon Shergold
- Bartley McCullum as Ben Possiter
- Richard Wangermann as Hassell (credited as Richard Wangemann)
- Eleanor Dunn as Ione Nuneham
- Betty Brice as Phoebe Ransford (credited as Rosetta Brice)
- Ruth Bryan as Naomi Rebbings
- Frankie Mann
- Florence Hackett
- Charles Brandt
- William H. Turner

== Production ==
The film was produced by the Lubin Manufacturing Company and distributed by the General Film Company in the United States on January 17, 1916.

== Preservation ==
The film is considered a lost film by the National Film Preservation Board (NFPB) as of January 2021.
