= The City of Purple Dreams (1928 film) =

1928 film

- Directed by: Duke Worne
- Written by: Edwin Baird (novel); George W. Pyper
- Produced by: W. Ray Johnston
- Starring: Barbara Bedford; Robert Frazer; David Torrence
- Cinematography: Walter L. Griffin
- Edited by: J.S. Harrington
- Production company: Trem Carr Pictures
- Distributed by: Rayart Pictures
- Release date: September 1, 1928
- Running time: 60 minutes
- Country: United States
- Languages: Silent; English intertitles

The City of Purple Dreams is a 1928 American silent drama film directed by Duke Worne and starring Barbara Bedford, Robert Frazer and David Torrence.

== Cast ==
- Barbara Bedford as Esther Strom
- Robert Frazer as Daniel Randolph
- David Torrence as Symington Otis
- Jacqueline Gadsdon as Kathleen Otis
- Paul Panzer as Slug Nikolay
- Jack Carlyle as Kelly
- Henry Roquemore as Quigg
