= Gladys Hanson =

American actress (1884–1973)

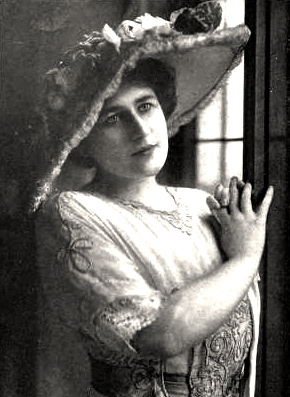
- Featured in The Theatre Magazine, 1912
- Born: Gladys Snook; September 5, 1884; Atlanta, Georgia, U.S.
- Died: February 23, 1973 (aged 88); Atlanta, Georgia, U.S.
- Occupation: Actor
- Years active: 1907–1939
- Spouse: Charles Emerson Cook (m. 1916, divorced)
- Children: 1

Gladys Hanson (born Gladys Hanson Snook; September 5, 1884 – February 23, 1973) was a stage and silent film actress.

== Early years ==
Hanson was born Gladys Hanson Snook, the youngest daughter of Mr. and Mrs. Peyton Harrison Snook.

== Career ==
Hanson began her career on the Broadway stage portraying the Duchess in The Spoiler in 1907 with the Charles Frohman Company. On the stage she played in the theatrical productions Our American Cousin (1908) with Edward Hugh Sothern, The Builder of Bridge (1909) with later film star Eugene O'Brien and The Governor's Lady (1912) with Emma Dunn and future film leading man Milton Sills.

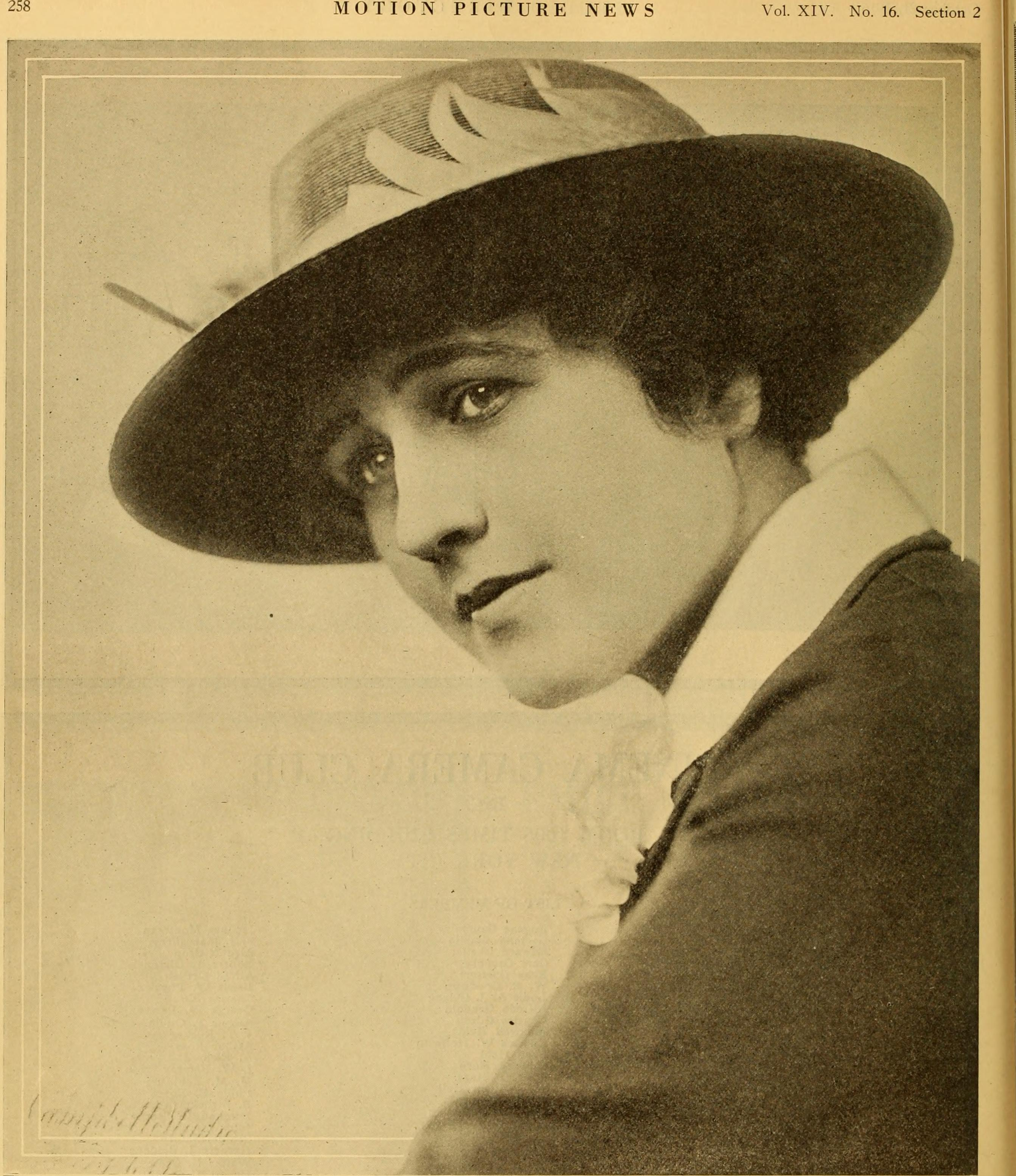
Hanson in 1916

She starred in The Straight Road (Famous Players), The Evangelist and The Climbers (Lubin), The Primrose Path (Universal), and The Havoc (Essanay).

== Personal life and death ==
On April 12, 1916, in Atlanta, Hanson married Charles Emerson Cook who represented her at Charles Emerson Cook Inc., but they later divorced. They had one child, Gladys-Irene Cook.

On February 23, 1973, Hanson died, aged 89.

== Filmography ==
Year	Title	Role	Notes
1914	The Straight Road	Mary 'Moll' O'Hara	
1915	The Climbers	Blanche Sterling	
1915	The Primrose Path		
1916	The Evangelist	Christabel Nuneham	
1916	The Havoc		
1917	National Red Cross Pageant	Liberty	Final episode
1928	Walls Tell Tales		Short

== Bibliography ==
- Raeburn, Eleanor, "Belasco's New Leading Woman", The Theatre Magazine, v.XVI n.140, October, 1912, p. 110.
