= Betty Brice =

American actress

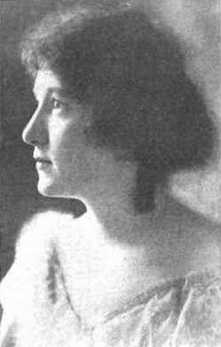
- Brice in a 1915 publication
- Born: Rosetta Dewart Brice; August 4, 1888; Sunbury, Pennsylvania, U.S.
- Died: February 15, 1935 (aged 46); Van Nuys, California, U.S.
- Other names: Rosetta Brice
- Occupation: Actress
- Spouse(s): John Oliver La Gorce (divorced 1913); Jack Pratt
- Children: 1
- Relatives: William Lewis Dewart (grandfather)

Rosetta Dewart Brice (August 4, 1888 – February 15, 1935), known professionally as Betty Brice, was an American actress in many silent films.

== Early life ==
Rosetta Dewart Brice was born in Sunbury, Pennsylvania, the daughter of Edward Lincoln Brice and Bessie S. Dewart Brice. Her maternal grandfather was William Lewis Dewart, a congressman from Pennsylvania. Her grandmother and great-grandmother were both also named "Rosetta". She was raised in Washington, D.C.

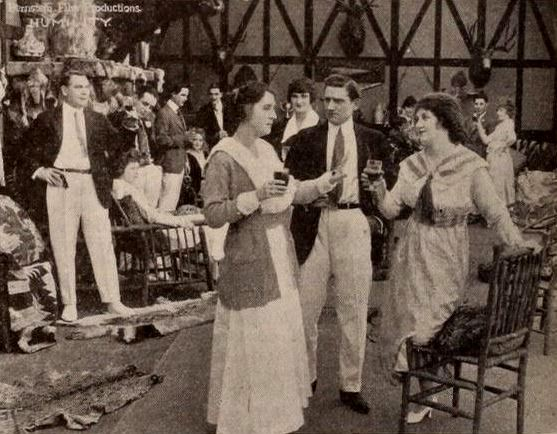
Still from the American film Humility (1918) with Betty Brice, on page 32 of the September 8, 1917 Exhibitors Herald.

== Career ==
After some time on the stage with stock companies, Brice began acting in silent films, under contract to the Lubin studio in Philadelphia. "I daresay I never will fail to feel that little thrill that comes when I see myself on the screen," she told an interviewer in 1915.

Films featuring Brice, many of them short films and serials that highlighted Brice's athleticism in stunts, riding, and swimming scenes, included Michael Strogoff (1914), The Fortune Hunter (1914), The Road o' Strife (1915), The Sporting Duchess (1915), The Phantom Happiness (1915), The Rights of Man: A Story of War's Red Blotch (1915), The Meddlesome Darling (1915), A Man's Making (1915), The Gods of Fate (1916), Her Bleeding Heart (1916), Love's Toll (1916), Loyalty (1917), Humility (1918), and Beau Brummel (1924).

== Personal life ==
Brice was engaged to Horace Carpentier Hurlbutt in 1908, but when he objected to her acting career she broke the engagement. She soon married editor John Oliver La Gorce instead; they had a son, Gilbert Grosvenor La Gorce, before they divorced in 1913. She married director and actor Jack Pratt as her second husband. She died in 1935 at age 46 from heart disease, in Van Nuys, California.

== Filmography ==
- The Price of Victory (1913)
- A Servant of the Rich (1914)
- The House of Fear (1914)
- A Cruel Revenge (1914)
- The Puritan (1914)
- The Mansion of Sobs (1914)
- Officer Jim (1914)
- In the Northland (1914)
- The Greater Treasure (1914)
- The Incompetent (1914)
- The Wolf (1914)
- Michael Strogoff (1914)
- The Fortune Hunter (1914)
- The Erring (1914)
- The Only Way Out (1915)
- The Blessed Miracle (1915)
- The Road o' Strife (1915)
- The College Widow (1915)
- In the Dark (1915)
- The Sporting Duchess (1915)
- Her Answer (1915)
- The District Attorney (1915)
- Whom the Gods Would Destroy (1915)
- The Call of Motherhood (1915)
- The Climbers (1915)
- Polly of the Pots and Pans (1915)
- The Phantom Happiness (1915)
- The Last Rose (1915)
- When Youth is Ambitious (1915)
- The Rights of Man: A Story of War's Red Blotch (1915)
- The Meddlesome Darling (1915)
- A Man's Making (1915)
- Sweeter than Revenge (1915)
- The Evangelist (1916)
- The Gods of Fate (1916)
- Her Bleeding Heart (1916)
- Love's Toll (1916)
- Who Knows? (1917)
- Loyalty (1917)
- Humility (1918)
- The Third Generation (1920)
- The Sagebrusher (1920)
- The Money Changers (1920)
- A Beggar in Purple (1920)
- The Spenders (1921)
- The Green Temptation (1922)
- Heart's Haven (1922)
- Beau Brummel (1924)
