= Gaston Bell =

American actor (1877–1963)

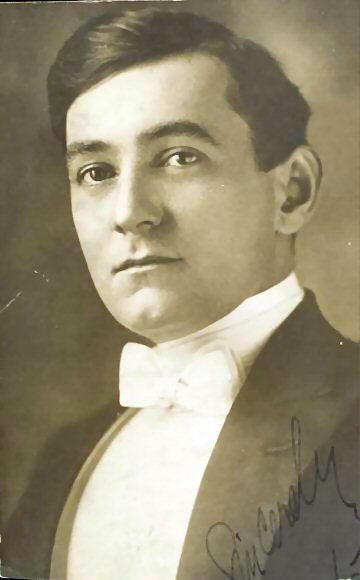
- Bell, 1910s
- Born: George Gaston Bell; September 27, 1877; Boston, Massachusetts, U.S.A.
- Died: December 13, 1963 (aged 86); Woodstock, New York, U.S.A.
- Occupations: Stage and screen actor
- Spouse(s): Adelaide Cronley (divorced c. 1919)

George Gaston Bell (September 27, 1877 – December 13, 1963) was an American stage and film actor active over the early decades of the twentieth century.

== Early life and career ==
Bell was born in 1877 at Boston, Massachusetts to George and Elizabeth Bell. His acting career began in 1902 as a member of Charles Frohman's theatrical organization shortly after his graduation from the American Academy of Dramatic Arts in New York. In 1903 Bell toured in Hall Caine's The Christian as Horatio Drake with a troop headed by Lionel Adams and Bianca West. The following year he supported Harry Beresford in Charles T. Vincent's Our New Man, and in the spring of 1905 he replaced William Courtenay as Little Billee in Trilby at New York's New Amsterdam Theatre. The next season Bell played one of the three suitors in Clara Lipman's Julie Bonbon. and on New Year's Eve, 1906 he began a long run on Broadway and on the road playing Horace Pettingill in Brewster's Millions. In 1910 Bell toured with the Columbia Stock Company performing in such plays as Clyde Fitche's Girls as the misanthrope Frank Loot, and the supporting role Bryce Forrester in Caught in the Rain by William Collier, Sr. and Grant Stewart. Bell's last known Broadway performance was in the comedy Seven Sisters which ran for 32 performances at the Lyceum Theatre in February and March 1911 before embarking on its road tour.

== Film career and later life ==
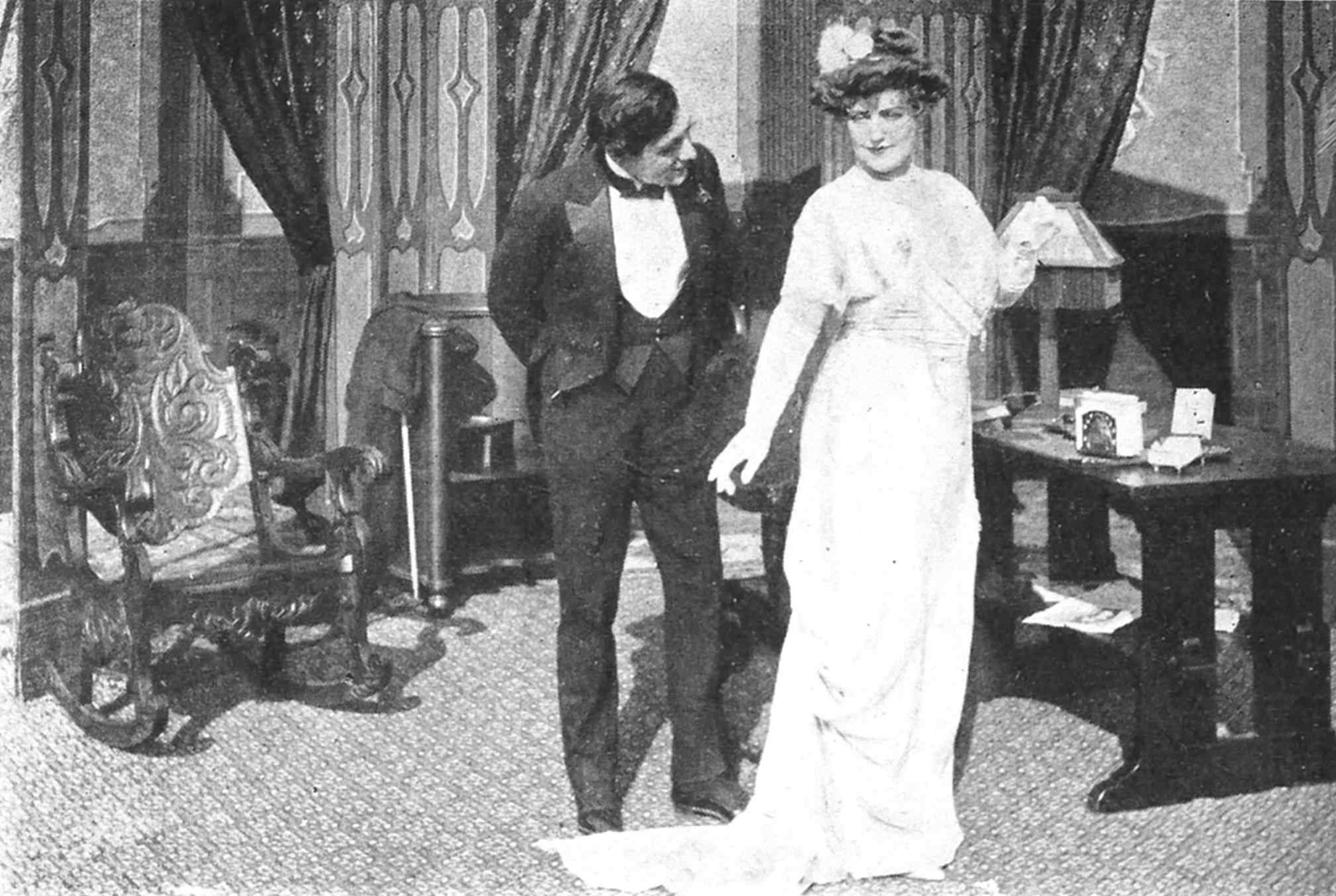
Bell with Lillian Russell at the Hollywood studios of the Kinemacolor Company of America, 1912.

Bell entered film around 1912 with the Majestic Motion Picture Company, appearing that year in at least two short films, Opportunity and A Warrior Bold. The following year Bell worked for the Kinemacolor Company of America before joining the Lubin Manufacturing Company to play in films written by playwright Charles Klein. In 1915 he played John Froment II opposite Theda Bara in the William Fox silent film, Destruction. His last known motion picture was the 1919 film, The Heart of a Gypsy by Charles Miller Productions. By late 1918 Bell was back on the road touring in The Naughty Wife by Fred Jackson and the next year with the Max Marcin comedy, Cheating Cheaters. Around this time his ten-year marriage to Adelaide (née Cronley) Bell ended in a Reno, Nevada courtroom. Bell later retired to Woodstock, New York to manage an inn, write plays and serve as the first director of the Woodstock Community Players. He died there in December 1963, aged 86.

== Selected filmography ==
- The Third Degree (1913)
- The Lion and the Mouse (1914)
- The Fortune Hunter (1914)
- The Daughters of Men (1914)
- The Wolf (1914)
- Destruction (1915)
