= The Wolf (1914 film) =

1914 film directed by Barry O'Neil

- Directed by: Barry O'Neil
- Based on: the play, The Wolf by Eugene Walter
- Starring: Bernard Siegel; Ruth Bryan; George Soule Spencer
- Cinematography: Fred Chaston
- Production company: Lubin Mfg Co.
- Distributed by: General Film Co.
- Release date: August 1914 (US)
- Running time: 5 reels
- Country: United States
- Language: English

The Wolf is a 1914 American silent drama film directed by Barry O'Neil, based on the play of the same name by Eugene Walter. The film stars Bernard Siegel, Ruth Bryan, and George Soule Spencer.

== Cast list ==
- Bernard Siegel as Baptiste Le Grand
- Ruth Bryan as Annette
- George Soule Spencer as Jules Beaubien
- Ferdinand Tidmarsh as McDonald, "the Wolf"
- Gaston Bell as McDonald's assistant
- Joe Kaufman
- Charles Brandt
- Edwin Barbour
- Richard Wangemann
- Mart Heisey
