= The Texas Streak =

1926 film

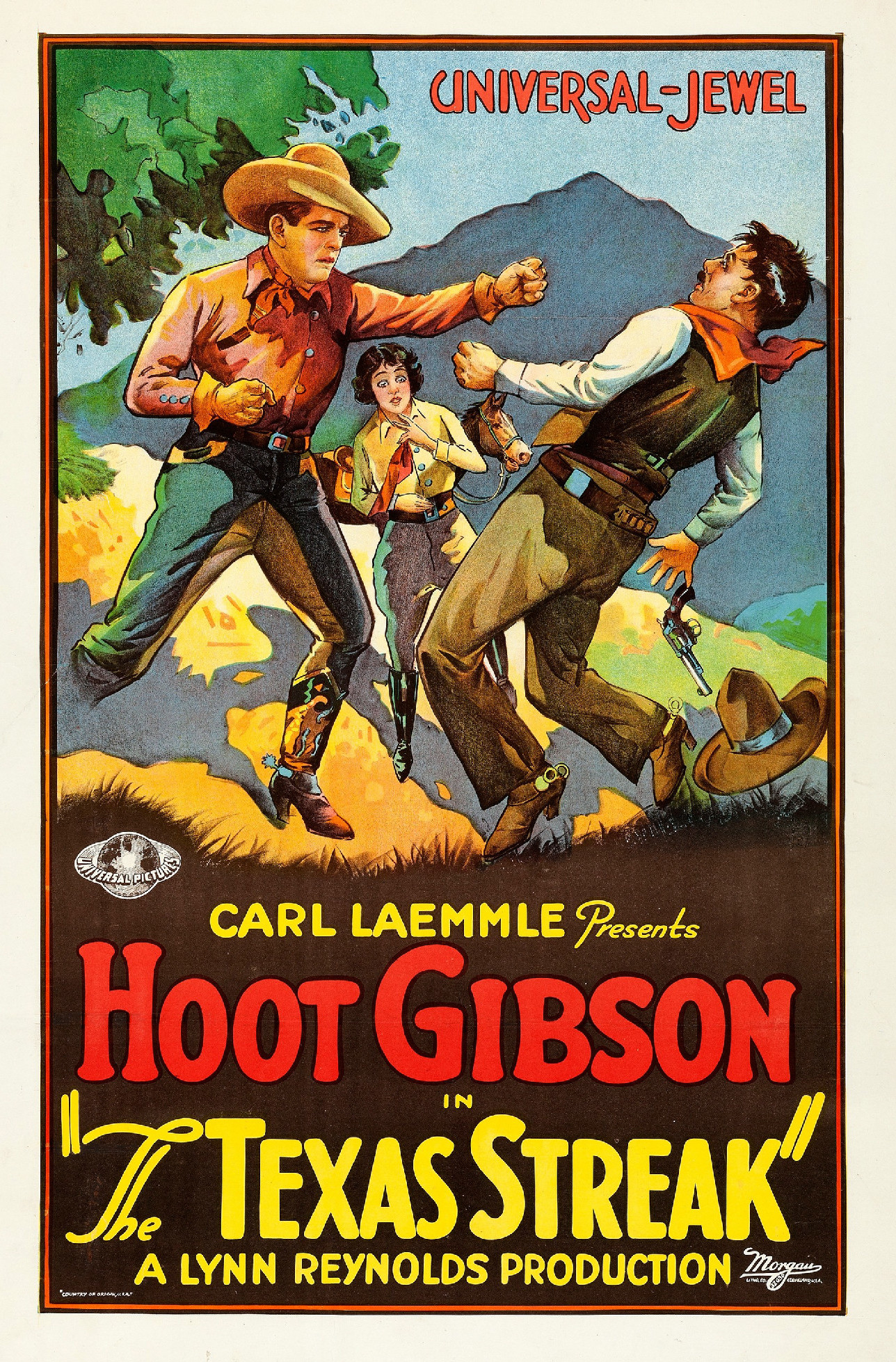
- Film poster
- Directed by: Lynn Reynolds
- Written by: Lynn Reynolds (writer and story)
- Produced by: Carl Laemmle
- Starring: Hoot Gibson
- Cinematography: Edward Newman
- Distributed by: Universal Pictures
- Release date: September 26, 1926
- Running time: 70 minutes
- Country: United States
- Language: Silent (English intertitles)

The Texas Streak is a 1926 American silent Western film directed by Lynn Reynolds and starring Hoot Gibson. It was produced and distributed by Universal Pictures.

== Plot ==
As described in a film magazine, Chad Pennington, a motion picture extra on location with a Hollywood movie company in Arizona, is stranded with his pals Jiggs and Swede when they lose their railroad fares in a game of craps and cannot persuade the hardhearted assistant director to provide transportation. They are painfully broke, but have some costumes, chaps, and guns with them. Chad goes to Bowie, the nearest town, and discovers that the water company is warring with the ranchers, and wants to hire a gun-man to guard its surveyors. Chad qualifies as a dead-shot by using some clever tricks involving the firing of blank cartridges. He wins quite a reputation and gets the job. By a series of clever artifices he forestalls one attack on the surveyors, and furthers his reputation as being a "bad man". He attends a masked country dance, quarrels with Powell, a rancher who is leading the fight, flees from the house, not knowing that his enemy, firing at him, has wounded Jimmy Hollis, young son of another rancher, and brother of Amy Hollis, in whom Chad has become interested. In the flight he is wounded but manages to evade his pursuers and hides in the hills. Amy finds him, and feeds and nurses him back to health. When he recovers he returns to the Hollis ranch, frees his pals, who have been captured by the ranchers, prevents another attack on the surveyors, and finally establishes his innocence in the shooting of Jimmy, who is now recovering. Amy's father is at last convinced that the water company plans to deal fairly with him, and abandons the fight. The hardboiled assistant director hunts up the "bad man" with the astonishing report that the company has decided to star Chad in some western films.

== Cast ==
- Hoot Gibson as Chad Pennington
- Blanche Mehaffey as Amy Hollis
- Alan Roscoe as Jefferson Powell
- James A. Marcus as Colonel Hollis
- Jack Curtis as Jiggs Cassidy
- Slim Summerville as Swede Sonberg
- Les Bates as Pat Casey
- Jack Murphy as Jimmie Hollis
- William H. Turner as Charles Logan, a Surveyor

== Preservation ==
A print of The Texas Streak survives in a private collector's collection.
