= How Rastus Gets His Turkey =

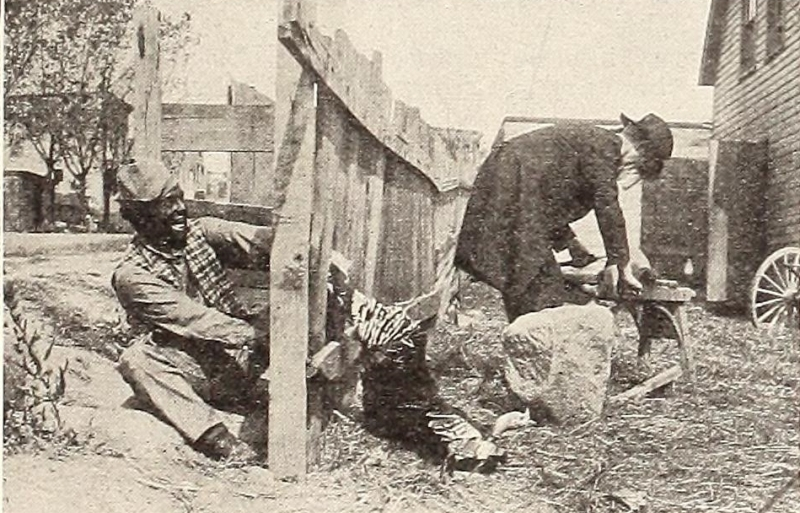
- Scene from film
- Directed by: Theodore Wharton
- Written by: Edward José
- Starring: Billy Quirk; Edward José; Octavia Handworth
- Production company: Pathé Frères
- Distributed by: Pathé Frères
- Release date: November 1910
- Running time: 1 reel
- Country: United States
- Language: Silent

How Rastus Gets His Turkey is a 1910 slapstick comedy silent film directed by Theodore Wharton. The film stars Billy Quirk (in blackface), Edward José and Octavia Handworth. The movie was written by José and produced and released by Pathé Frères. The film was part of a series of comedies that featured the title character named "Rastus".

== Plot ==
It is the day before Thanksgiving, and Rastus who is without a cent to his name, has promised himself that, come what may, his wife Eliza and his daughter shall eat of a plump turkey the following day. Prowling round the local butchers he watches the stock of birds gradually dwindle without having the opportunity to take one unobserved. At last he becomes desperate, and when old George Green purchases the last bird he sees that his only chance is to take it from him by hook or by crook. Arriving home, Green takes the turkey out in the yard to kill it. While he turns away for a few minutes to sharpen his knife, Rastus puts his hand through a hole in the wooden fence and seizes the bird. The hole is not large enough to pull the bird through, but Rastus tries to do so, with the result that he pulls three of the planks of the fence out, and with his hand through these and still holding on to the turkey like grim death, he bolts for home. Green starts in pursuit, but Rastus soon gets away from him, although he has many a laughable difficulty to overcome, for his stony brain could not see that he could take the turkey in the other hand and drop the three boards. When Thanksgiving Day arrives the following morn, Rastus and his family have a great time over the dinner.

The Moving Picture World (1910)

== Cast ==
- Billy Quirk – Rastus
- Edward José – George Green
- Octavia Handworth – Rastus's wife

== See also ==
- List of American films of 1910
- Rastus
