= Laughter in Hell =

1933 film by Edward L. Cahn

- Directed by: Edward L. Cahn
- Written by: Tom Reed
- Based on: Laughter in Hell by Jim Tully
- Produced by: Carl Laemmle, Jr.
- Starring: Pat O'Brien; Gloria Stuart
- Cinematography: John Stumar
- Edited by: Philip Cahn
- Distributed by: Universal Pictures
- Release date: January 12, 1933
- Running time: 70 minutes
- Country: United States

Laughter in Hell is a 1933 American pre-Code drama film directed by Edward L. Cahn and starring Pat O'Brien. The film's title was typical of the sensationalistic titles of many Pre-Code films. Adapted from the 1932 novel of the same name by Jim Tully, the film was inspired in part by I Am a Fugitive from a Chain Gang and was part of a series of films depicting men in chain gangs following the success of that film. O'Brien plays a railroad engineer who kills his wife and her lover in a jealous rage and is sent to prison. The movie received a mixed review in The New York Times upon its release. Although long considered lost, the film was recently preserved and was screened at the American Cinematheque in Hollywood, Los Angeles, in October 2012.

The dead man's brother ends up being the warden of the prison and subjects O'Brien's character to significant abuse. O'Brien and several other characters revolt, killing the warden and escaping from the prison. The film drew controversy for its lynching scene where several black men were hanged. Contrary to reports, only blacks were hanged in this scene, though the actual executions occurred off-camera (we see instead reaction shots of the guards and other prisoners). The New Age (an African American weekly newspaper) film critic praised the scene for being courageous enough to depict the atrocities that were occurring in some southern states.

== Plot ==
O'Brien plays an Irish mine worker, Barney Slaney. Later Barney gets a job as a fireman on the local train for an engineer named Mileaway. He gets married, but finds his wife having an affair with Grover Perkins, a childhood nemesis. Barney loses control and kills them both. He turns himself in and receives a life sentence of hard labor. Barney quickly finds out that the brother of the man he killed, Ed Perkins, will be in charge of his chain gang, and the brother bullies him repeatedly. While the prisoners dig graves, Barney knocks Ed unconscious and drops him into one of the open graves. He then escapes during the ensuing mayhem, in which the warden is killed. He breaks out of the police dragnet, and hides at a farm which recently had a pestilence infection. He meets a woman named Lorraine, and they run away together.

== Cast ==
- Pat O'Brien as Barney Slaney
- Tommy Conlon as Barney as a boy
- Gloria Stuart as Lorraine
- Berton Churchill as Mike Slaney
- Merna Kennedy as MaryBell Evans
- Douglass Dumbrille as Ed Perkins
- Dick Winslow as Ed Perkins as a boy
- Arthur Vinton as Grover Perkins
- Tom Brown as Barton
- Lew Kelly as Mileaway
- Clarence Muse as Abraham Jackson
- Noel Madison as Brownfield
- Tom Ricketts as Judge
- William H. Turner as I.N. Tree

== Production ==
The railroad scenes were filmed on the Sierra Railroad in Tuolumne County, California.

== Pre-Code uncensored scenes ==
A controversial lynching scene where several black men were hanged, gained headlines after the film was released. The Motion Picture Herald expressed concern that the events depicted could be very difficult for some African Americans to watch. Writing in New Age (an African American weekly newspaper) Vere E. Johns praised the producers for depicting the scene and in so doing, publicizing the atrocities that were happening in some southern states. Johns also disagreed with the initial reports in the Herald which stated that only blacks were lynched, Johns stated (erroneously) that both blacks and whites were lynched in the picture.

Although Universal Pictures released Laughter in Hell with the lynching scene intact, like many American films of the time the film was subject to cuts by city and state film censorship boards. Several censorship boards including New York, Ohio, Massachusetts, Pennsylvania, and Chicago removed the lynching scene, allowing only indications that a hanging was about to take place.

== Reception ==
Mordaunt Hall, writing for The New York Times praised the acting, the characterizations, action sequences, and some of the banter, but was not impressed with the storyline.
