= The Lion and the Mouse (1914 film) =

1914 film by Barry O'Neil

- Directed by: Barry O'Neil
- Written by: Charles Klein (scenario)
- Based on: play, The Lion and the Mouse, by Charles Klein
- Starring: Ethel Clayton
- Cinematography: Fred Chaston
- Production company: Lubin Manufacturing Company
- Distributed by: General Film Company
- Release date: January 1914
- Running time: 6 reels
- Country: USA
- Language: Silent...English titles

The Lion and the Mouse is a lost 1914 American silent drama film directed by Barry O'Neil and starring Ethel Clayton. It was produced by the Lubin Manufacturing Company and distributed through the General Film Company. The film was adapted from the 1905 stage production The Lion and the Mouse by English playwright Charles Klein. Unfortunately, the master negative for the screen production was destroyed in the disastrous Lubin vault fire of 1914, along with the bulk of that studio's pre-1914 film collection.

== Plot ==
As described by Motion Picture News:

John Burkett Ryder, a master of finance, has compassed the financial ruin and professional dishonor of Judge Rossmore of the Supreme Court, because of certain adverse decisions he had made against the "Money Trust," which Ryder controls. Shirley Rossmore, the judge's daughter, returning from Europe meets young Jefferson Ryder on shipboard. Neither has any hint of the friction existing between their respective fathers, and the two young people fall in love, although the elder Ryder has other plans for his son.

Arriving in America, Shirley learns of her father's disgrace. Having gained from her lover an intimate knowledge of the character and personality of his father, she determines to write a book exposing the workings of the "Money Trust," hoping through it to vindicate her own father's record. Meanwhile Jefferson Ryder is searching everywhere for her.

Under the nom de plume of Sarah Green, Shirley's book is published and attracts the attention of Ryder. He invites her to his home to write his biography. Then begins the battle between the Lion and the Mouse.

Shirley learns the location of a letter, which, if made public, will clear her father. Jefferson Ryder, who has defied his father's efforts to make him wed another, at last is told by his father that if he will marry Miss Green, who has won the magnate's admiration by her cleverness and fearlessness, and forget Shirley Rossmore, he will forgive him.

Hearing that her father is very ill, Shirley, or Miss Green, as she is known in the Ryder household, determines to steal the precious letter. She is discovered by her lover, who aids her in forcing the drawer of his father's desk. Just as they have obtained the document, Ryder enters. He accuses his son of the theft, but Shirley, unwilling to have him bear the blame, declares her identity and announces the purpose with which she had become a member of the Ryder household.

She denounces Ryder and refuses to have anything to do with his son, because of her objection to his father. After a night of thought Ryder, who cannot but admire the girl's pluck, consents to eat humble pie and promises to go to Washington to set in motion the machinery which will clear Judge Rossmore's name, if Shirley will only marry his son. The picture ends with an effective "fade-out" showing the marriage reception at Judge Rosemore's Washington home.

== Cast ==
- Ethel Clayton – Shirley Rossmore, Sarah Green
- Gaston Bell – Jefferson Ryder
- George Soule Spencer – John Burkett Ryder
- Bartley McCullum – Judge Rossmore
- Robert Dunbar – Trust Lawyer
- Eleanor Barry – Mrs. Rossmore
- Lila Leslie – Mrs. Gordon (*as Lilie Leslie)
- Richard Morris – Ex-Judge Scott
- Carlotta Doti – Mrs. Ryder
- Ruth Bryan – Kate Roberts
- Walter C. Prichard –

== Reception ==
Moving Picture World reviewer Hanford C. Judson gave the film a positive review, stating that "motion picture making as an art most emphatically justifies itself" through the existence of The Lion and the Mouse. Judson also described the film as a "wholesome, human, heart-satisfying picture" and was "made greater than the play."

Merritt Crawford of the Motion Picture News also gave a positive review, saying of the adaptation "In many respects, indeed, the motion picture outrivals the original production, and there will be many who, having seen both, will unhesitatingly give their verdict in favor of the screen portrayal of Klein's masterpiece."

Motography also published a very positive review saying that The Lion and the Mouse "excels the stage version" and heaped praise upon the actors.
