= The Daughters of Men =

1914 film by George W. Terwilliger

- Directed by: George W. Terwilliger
- Written by: Lawrence McCloskey
- Based on: the play, The Daughters of Men by Charles Klein
- Starring: Percy Winter; William H. Turner; Gaston Bell
- Production company: Lubin Manufacturing Company
- Distributed by: General Film Co.
- Release date: April 13, 1914 (US)
- Running time: 5 reels
- Country: United States
- Language: English

The Daughters of Men is a 1914 American silent drama film directed by George W. Terwilliger, from a screenplay by Lawrence McCloskey. The film stars Percy Winter, William H. Turner, and Gaston Bell.

== Cast list ==
- Percy Winter as Daniel Crosby
- William H. Turner as Uncle Milbank
- Gaston Bell as Matthew Crosby
- George Soule Spencer as John Stedman
- Arthur Matthews as James Thedford
- Earl Metcalfe as Jem Burress
- Ethel Clayton as Louise Stolbeck
- Robert Dunba as Louis Stolbeck
- Kempton Greene as Reginald Crosby
- Bernard Siegel as Oscar Lackett
- James Daly as President McCarthy
- Lila Leslie as Lilie LeslieGrace Crosby
- Mabel Greene as Bella

== Production ==
It was revealed in January 1914 that George Terwilleger would be directing the film. It was the first feature film of Terwilliger's career, and at the time, he was thought to be one of the youngest directors in Hollywood.

== Reception ==
Variety gave the film a poor review, feeling the story was "trite" and lacked action. Although they felt the film was well cast, they stated it "is not worth the sitting through".
