= George Soule Spencer =

American actor

- Publicity Photo of George Soule Spencer
- Born: September 25, 1874; Wisconsin, U.S.
- Died: August 7, 1949 (aged 74); Los Angeles, California, U.S.
- Occupation: Actor

George Soule Spencer (1874–1949) was an American actor who appeared on stage and in silent films including in lead roles. He was married to Lillian White Spencer. They wrote The Flower of Chivalry in 1901.

He starred in the film The Evangelist (1916) with Gladys Hanson. He also starred in The College Widow (1915) with Ethel Clayton.

== Partial filmography ==
- The Third Degree (1913) as Richard Brewster
- The Wolf (1914) as Jules Beaubien Ferdinand
- The Daughters of Men (1914) as John Stedman
- The Fortune Hunter (1914) as Harry Kellogg
- The Lion and the Mouse (1914) as John Burkett Ryder
- The Sporting Duchess (1915) as Lord Desborough
- The Climbers (1915) as Ned Warden
- The College Widow (1915) as Billy Bolton
- The Great Ruby (1915)
- The Evangelist (1916)
