= 1914 Lubin vault fire =

Destruction of a film-storage vault

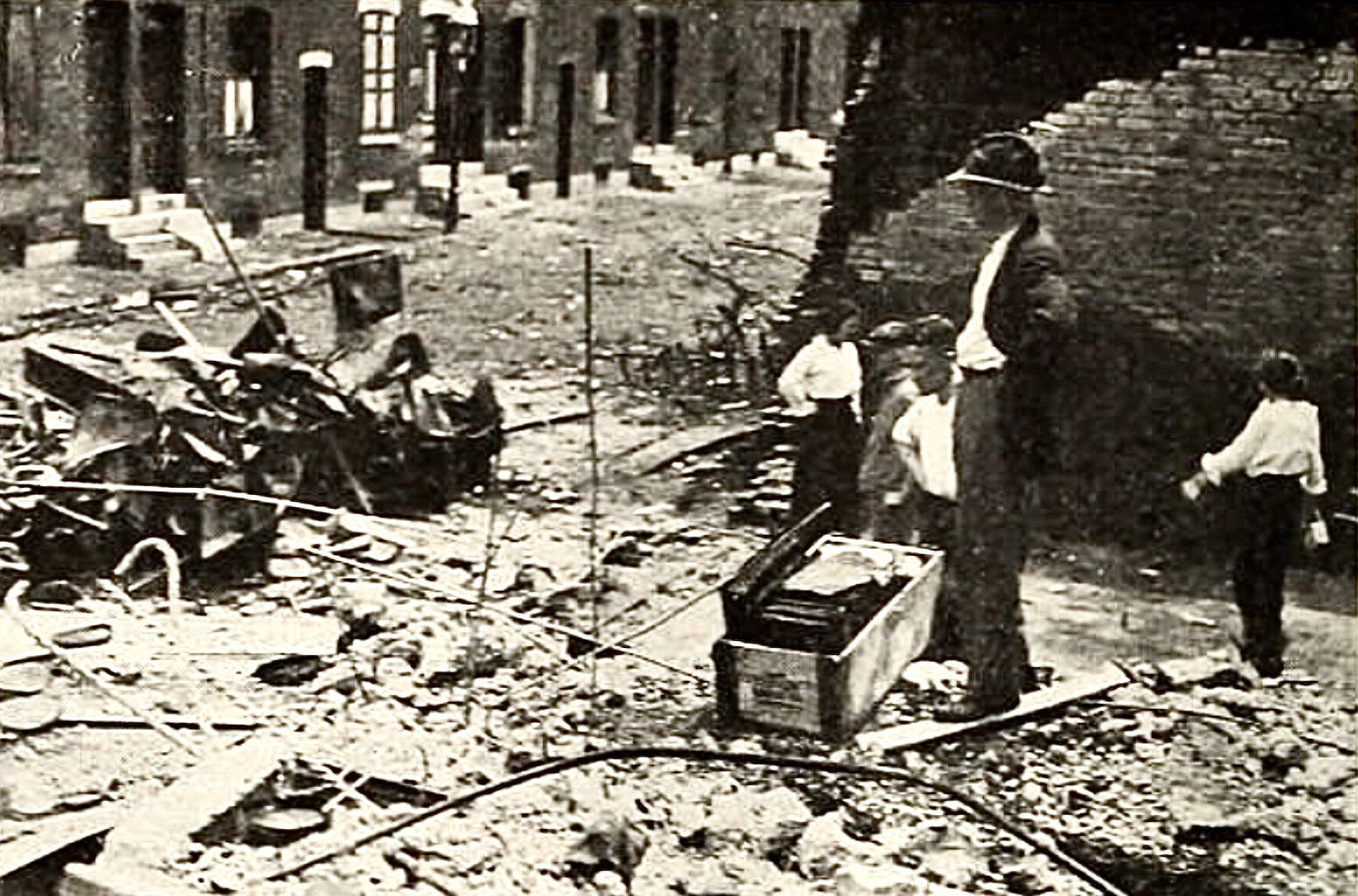
- Lubin vault custodian Stanley Lowry (foreground) surveying the destruction
- Date: June 13, 1914
- Location: Philadelphia, Pennsylvania United States; 39°59′59″N 75°09′44″W
- Cause: Unverified
- Outcome: Destruction of motion picture footage and other properties valued in 1914 between $500,000 and $2,000,000
- Deaths: 1 (unconfirmed)
- Injuries: 20

On the morning of June 13, 1914, a disastrous fire and a series of related explosions occurred in the main film vault of the Lubin Manufacturing Company in Philadelphia, Pennsylvania. Several possible causes for the blaze were cited at the time, one being "spontaneous combustion" of highly flammable nitrate film, which was the motion picture industry's standard medium for cameras throughout the silent era and for the first two decades of "talking pictures". Millions of feet of film were consumed in the flames, including most of the master negatives and initial prints of Lubin's pre-1914 catalog, several of the company's recently completed theatrical prints ready for release and distribution, a considerable number of films produced by other studios, inventories of raw and stock footage, hundreds of reels documenting historic events that occurred between 1897 and early 1914, as well as other films related to notable political and military figures, innovations in medical science, and professional athletic contests from that period. While this fire was not a decisive factor in Lubin's decline and bankruptcy by September 1916, costs associated with the disaster only added to the corporation's mounting debts, which led to the closure or sale of its remaining operations the following year.

== "Lubinville" in Philadelphia ==
In 1902, after five years of filming assorted rudimentary motion pictures, pioneer studio mogul Siegmund Lubin officially formed the Lubin Manufacturing Company in Philadelphia. Several buildings in the city served as the company's early downtown headquarters and production facilities, but the rapid growth of Lubin's business demanded much larger accommodations, so in 1910 he constructed a state-of-the-art studio and film-processing plant in North Philadelphia at the intersection of 20th Street and Indiana Avenue. Dubbed "Lubinville" by the press, the complex of buildings there was at the time among the most elaborate and technically advanced motion picture facilities in the world, with labs capable of processing up to 1,500,000 feet (460,000 m) of film per week.

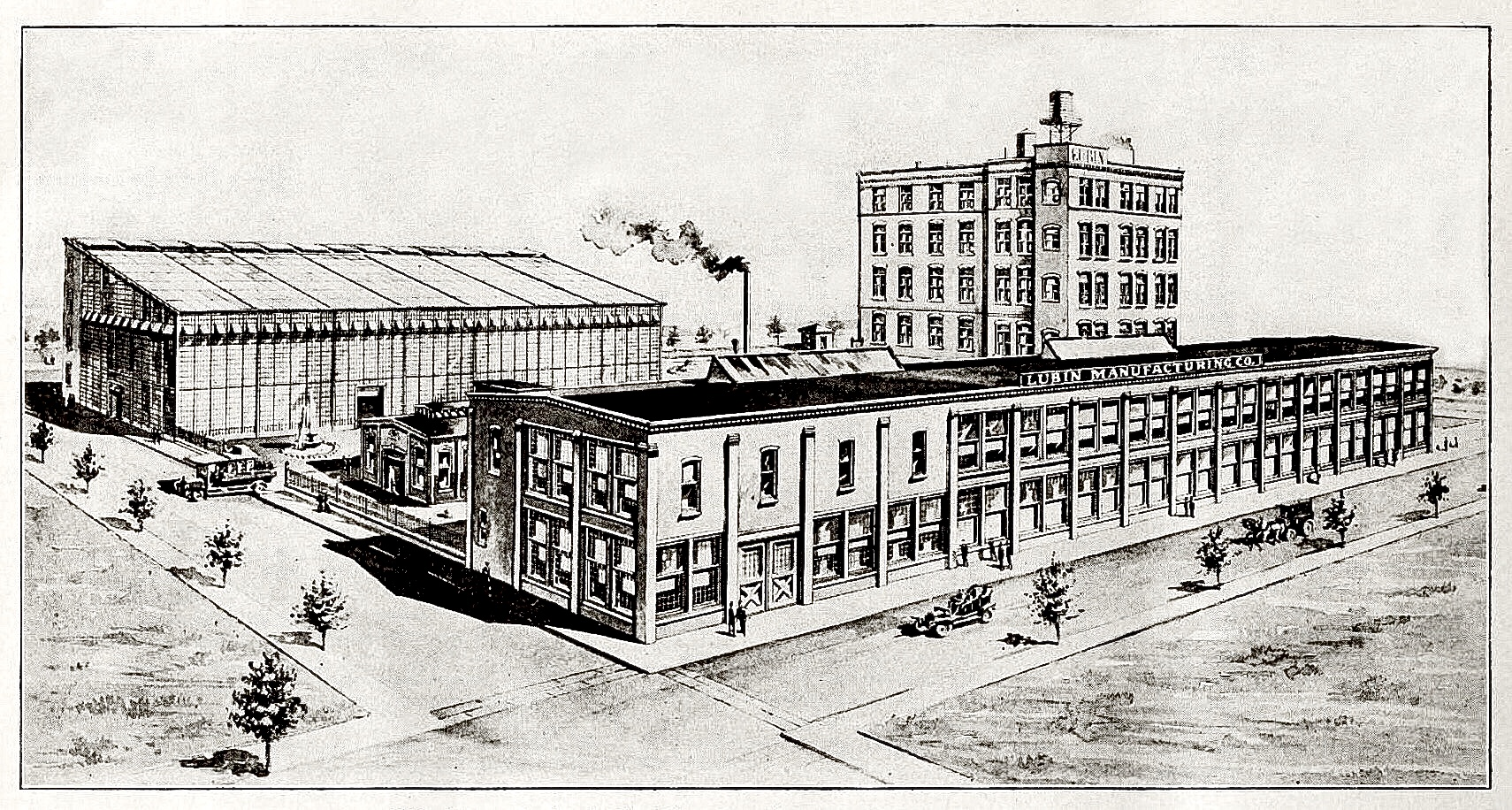
The Lubin plant as it appeared in 1911. Note at upper left the large glass-and-steel structure. This facility's interior, flooded with sunlight during the day, was used to film the company's theatrical releases.

The Lubin "film factory" included a studio with an area of 9,600 square feet (890 m^{2}). The studio had a slanted glass roof and glass walls supported by light steel framing. It also had costume rooms, property rooms, areas for set construction and equipment repair, a cafeteria, spaces for every phase of film processing, a large garage for servicing the plant's fleet of trucks and Lozier touring cars, and a five-story building (Note: In one prominent 1911 article in Motography about Lubinville, the tallest building on the site is described as a "four-story building", but earlier and later references to the structure describe it as a five-story facility, a height that is substantiated in several bird's-eye depictions of the film plant.) that housed administrative offices, shops on its top floor for the manufacture of projectors, and the plant's shipping department in its basement. Also at Lubinville was the most up-to-date vault for storing and organizing the company's growing catalog of master negatives and prints for its theatrical releases, its historical films, and all other footage under its care.

In addition to generating revenue from its own motion pictures, Lubinville earned substantial income by processing and assembling theatrical print copies for other studios, which explains why some master negatives and test prints for productions made by other companies were also stored in Lubinville's film vault. Various studios sent their negatives to Lubin for printing, for the Philadelphia firm was highly regarded in the motion picture industry for the superior clarity of its footage, a reputation represented by the company's logo, the image of the Liberty Bell accompanied by the motto "Clear As A Bell". In one of its 1914 issues, the trade paper Billboard explained how Lubinville received, processed, edited to specifications, and stored films for its studio customers:

Although not generally known, the product of the Reliance and most of the Eastern Mutual companies are sent to this city in its raw state (directly from the cameras) to be developed. After one copy is made by the Lubin factory it is shipped to the company owning negative, and when returned, cut to proper length, with subtitles inserted and all scenes assembled properly, as many positives as ordered are made up here and shipped back to the original producer. This is admittedly the largest and best factory in the East, and most producing companies have their films made, etc., by the Lubin force.

=== The film vault ===
Lubinville's film vault was located at the "extreme southeastern corner of the plant", and for safety reasons it was positioned outside employee work areas and situated on the perimeter of the complex. The vault's lengthy front side, however, did not face empty lots; it faced North Garnet Street, a narrow residential street lined on the other side with two-story brick row houses. Every precaution was taken to minimize the possibility of fire in and around the vault since the dangers of using and storing volatile thermoplastic film stocks were very well known in 1914 and were subjects of ongoing concern in the motion picture industry. The standard film type used by studios at the time was composed of celluloid, which photographic companies manufactured by treating nitrocellulose with camphor as a plasticizer. The combination produced a flexible and effective film strip for cameras, but it was also a highly sensitive material that could be easily ignited and burned intensely. Celluloid film, also referred to as nitrate film owing to its nitrocellulose base, only became more unstable and more hazardous as it aged. Off-gassing and heat were byproducts of the material as it continued to degrade over time, especially in storage conditions with excessive humidity and elevated temperatures. Film cans or reels containing deteriorating nitrate stock had the capability of "autoigniting" or spontaneously combusting. Once burning, the film was extremely difficult to extinguish since celluloid contains sufficient oxygen within its molecular structure to continue burning even when fully immersed in water.

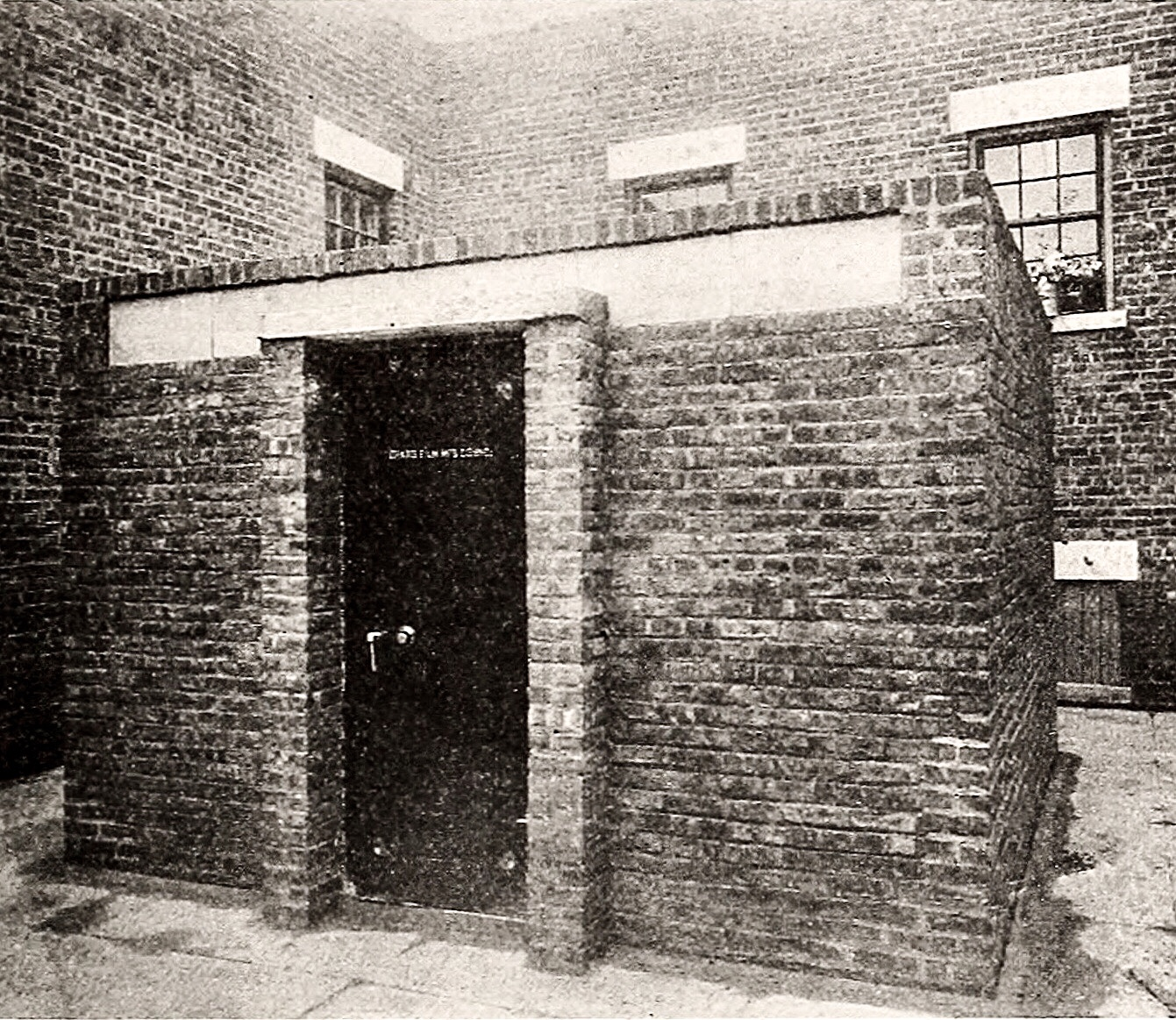
Lubinville's vault consisted of five adjoining units, each similar to but larger than this vault at the Evans Film Company in New York, 1914.

With concerns regarding the instability of nitrate film and the inherent dangers of storing it, many safety features were incorporated into the design and construction of Lubinville's one-story "fireproof" vault, which according to news accounts occupied a total area of 2,000 square feet (190 m^{2}) with perimeter walls of red brick 13 inches (33 cm) thick. The whole vault, running 100 feet (30 m) in length, was divided into five adjoining but "entirely separate" compartments or units, each measuring 400 square feet (37 m^{2}) and separated from one another by interior walls, also brick, 9 inches (23 cm) thick. This chambered configuration was intended to minimize losses and contain a blaze if one unit ever caught fire, reducing the likelihood of its migration to the other four. All of the units shared a reinforced concrete roof and concrete flooring that were 8 inches (20 cm) thick, with access to each unit through individual sealed "bank-like" doors outfitted with burglar-proof locks. No lighting fixtures or devices with electrical "wiring of any sort" were installed inside the units. Daytime illumination of each interior relied solely on a pair of narrow "deadlights" or sealed skylights positioned on the structure's roof and fitted with glass 1 inch (2.5 cm) thick. In late afternoons or on overcast days when more light was needed, assigned "runners" or any other Lubin employee who entered the vault to retrieve, return, or to organize films, that person was required to use only a special battery-powered "hand flashlight". Air exchange inside each unit relied on a passive ventilation system consisting of four "grated windows near the roof" and two vents at the base of the unit's back wall on the factory side of the vault. To prevent the spread of fires and to protect further both the vault and employee work spaces inside the plant, a "heavy double fireproof wall" of brick and reinforced concrete was incorporated into the factory's perimeter wall that was set back from the vault and ran the entire length of the five units.

=== Fire-safety standards at the plant ===
Unlike New York City's infamous 1911 Triangle Shirtwaist Factory fire, when 146 employees died in a cluttered working environment with poor safety standards, Lubinville's facilities in uptown Philadelphia were for their time models of fire prevention, evacuation procedures, and fire-suppression capability. Lubin, like other motion picture studios and film-processing plants in that period, stored large quantities of exposed and raw nitrate stock, a material that seemed "determined to destroy itself", very often in flames by its "own volition". Reels and cans containing nitrate footage therefore posed a constant fire threat, with blazes at storage sites regularly reported in newspapers and trade publications in which film stock was blamed either as the cause or as a powerful accelerant in spreading any flame.

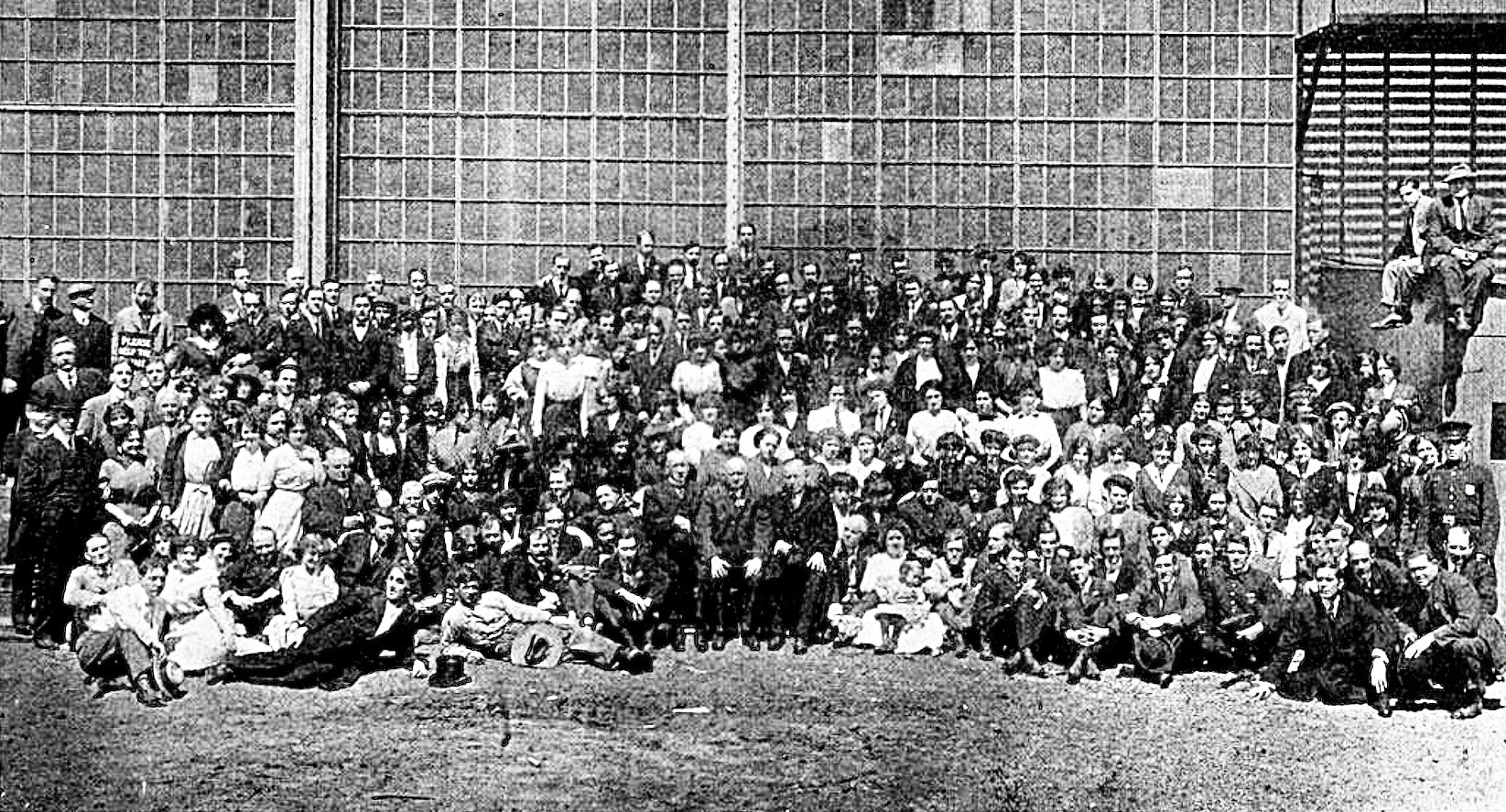
Siegmund Lubin (seated center) posing with his employees at Lubinville two years before the fire

Prior to the fire at Lubinville, employees there were described as working "secure in the knowledge that there was no place in the plant where a fire extinguisher or fire hose was not plainly visible and functional". All exits throughout the complex were marked and kept unobstructed in accordance with not only Philadelphia fire regulations but also at the insistence of Siegmund Lubin himself. Fire drills were regularly held, and work areas were "maintained in a scrupulous state of Teutonic tidiness". Fire-safety rules were also rigorously followed and were described by employees to be "as strict as those of a battleship".

Despite Lubin's attention to safety procedures, fire remained an ongoing concern at the plant and throughout the film industry in the summer of 1914, a concern heightened by three very destructive fires that occurred at other companies earlier in the year. On March 19, flames swept through the plant of the Eclair Moving Picture Company in Fort Lee, New Jersey, causing $750,000 in damages ($24,110,000 today). Several buildings there and films in that studio's "fireproof" vault burned. News reports stated that the facility was "adequately equipped with hose lines", but employees were unable to battle the fire because there was no water pressure. Just nine days later, Edison's studio in New York City, in the Bronx, was very heavily damaged by fire. Then, on May 13, 1914, exactly a month before the Lubinville disaster, yet another fire destroyed a large collection of films at Universal Pictures and "gutted" much of that company's six-story Colonial Hall facility at 102 West 101st Street in Manhattan. However, none of those earlier 1914 events was traced directly to spontaneous combustion or to some other film-related cause. At Eclair the fire originated near a production being staged inside the studio; at Edison a short circuit inside a lighting switchboard was blamed; and "defective insulation" was cited as the source of Universal's costly accident. Still, when the fires reached and ignited large quantities of film stored at all three locations, the blazes immediately intensified and spread rapidly, adding greatly to the firefighters' tasks of extinguishing the flames and increasing substantially the damage and repair costs at the sites. Unfortunately for Edison, the company suffered a much worse fire at its headquarters in West Orange, New Jersey, later in 1914, on December 9. The origin of that catastrophic $7,000,000 loss for Edison ($225,000,000 today) was attributed to "an exploding film" inside a building where nitrate footage was stored and inspected. That structure and several other larger buildings were completely destroyed, as were "all the Edison photoplays" kept at that site, along with "cameras and m. p. [motion picture] apparatus of immense value".

== June 13 fire and explosions ==
On Saturday morning, June 13, 1914, during an extended summer heat wave in Philadelphia, "several hundred" employees were working at Lubinville. (Note: The trade journal The Moving Picture World reported two weeks after the fire, "About 500 people, including a number of actors and actresses, were at work in adjoining Lubin buildings at the time of the explosion." See "Big Fire at Lubin Plant", The Moving Picture World, June 27, 1914, p. 1803.) Suddenly, "shortly after" 10 a.m., they heard and felt a "terrific" explosion on the far east side of the complex. An undetected fire burning in one of the film vault's five units ignited celluloid gases that had built up inside the brick-and-concrete container. The resulting explosion had "ripped out the street side" of the structure and "shattered its roof", spreading the fire to other units, quickly setting alight millions of feet of highly flammable film stock and detonating three more violent explosions. "Flames shooting into the air over a hundred feet" and columns of thick dark smoke dominated the northern skyline of the city as the blasts hurled hundreds of metal film reels and cans with "blazing celluloid" in all directions, many high above the plant. Seconds later, the "flying" reels, can lids, and fragments of footage began raining down, setting off more fires both on and off the Lubin property as the odors of sulfur dioxide and other toxic gases from the burning film filled the area.

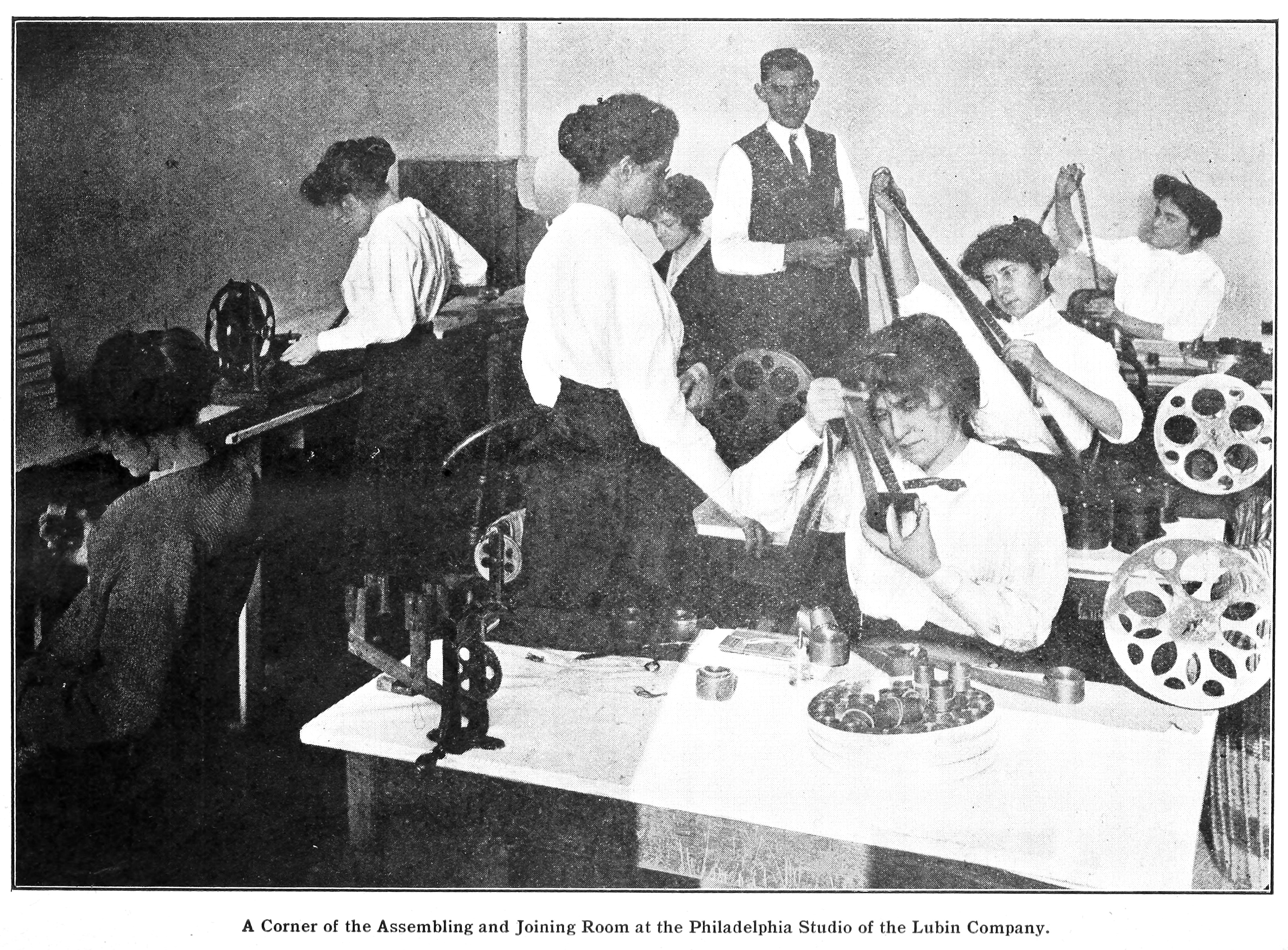
Employees in the plant's "Assembling and Joining Room", an area protected from the vault's explosions by a thick firewall

With the collapse of the vault's walls from the explosions, fire spread to the plant's printing rooms and shops, and then to part of the site's highest structure, its five-story main building. Burning debris continued to fall from the sky, igniting additional small fires throughout the central compound. Several row houses on the other side of North Garnet Street were roasted by the fiery blasts, as were cars parked along the narrow street. Then other houses began to smolder and ignite. Gathering at safe distances around the film factory, groups of stunned neighbors watched the inferno. Soon they were joined by Lubin set technicians, carpenters, film developers and assembly workers, mechanics, administrative staff, and actors, all of whom, after years of fire-drill training, had quickly evacuated their respective work areas. Some employees dared to remain behind in several plant locations in attempts to save "costly gowns and dresses of actresses"; grab drafts of "scenarios", completed scripts, and other important paperwork; and to carry out manageable pieces of expensive film-processing and production equipment.

The center of destruction, the vault area, lay largely in heaps of charred rubble littered with twisted rebar, mangled covers and bases of film cans, and melted projection reels. The brick walls and contents of four of the vault's units were entirely destroyed; the fifth unit, though severely damaged, was left standing. That structure survived total destruction because it served as future storage space for Lubin's growing catalog of negatives and prints. The unit was therefore filled largely with empty reels and empty film cans. If any supplies of unexposed or "raw" film stock were also kept in that space, the amounts were not in sufficient quantities to create enough explosive power to blow out the unit's heavy security door and demolish all of its walls.

=== Actors who provided assistance ===
Lubin employees, given the scope of the disaster, were thankful that favorable winds that day allowed the Philadelphia Fire Department to bring the widespread flames under control in less than an hour. City firefighters were also aided by plant personnel who were already using the site's own emergency water hoses and its ample supply of extinguishers when the municipal fire crews arrived. The New York Times in its coverage of the fiery explosions specifically recognized some of Lubin's actors and a visitor to the studio for their heroic efforts in assisting injured evacuees, saving lives, and battling the flames. "Among the moving picture actors who quickly acted heroes in real life", reported The Times, "were Charles S. Schultz, Frank Daniels, Joseph Boyle, Frank Haesler, Harry Myers, and Thomas Walsh." "Some of them", added the newspaper, "got a ladder and, climbing to the roof of the building, fought the fire with good effect."

The visitor to the plant who was credited with saving Lubin employees from serious injury or possible death was a local professional boxer, Willie Houck. (Note: The New York Times in its next-day coverage of the Lubin fire misspells Willie Houck's surname, identifying him as "Willie Hock". See "One Dying, 20 Hurt, in Fire: $1,500,000 Worth of Picture Films Burned in Lubin Plant", The New York Times, June 14, 1914, p. 7.) The featherweight title contender lived close to Lubinville, in the neighborhood of Mt. Airy in Northwest Philadelphia. Referred to as a "pugilist" and "lately a movie actor" in news coverage of the fire, Houck was reported to be "posing" in the studio for cameras when he heard the first explosion. Both The New York Times and the Chicago-based trade journal Motography described how the young boxer then "saved several girls who were in a panic at a window and about to jump."

== Suspected causes ==
While the origin of the fire remained questionable and was never officially verified in subsequent investigations, some authorities and reports in trade publications in 1914 immediately attributed it to spontaneous combustion. One other theory that gained greater traction in the days and weeks after the disaster blamed Philadelphia's prolonged heat wave and the intense summer sun. Although not issued as the definitive and official cause for the disaster, it was the personal opinion of Ira M. Lowry, who was Lubinville's general manager and the son-in-law of Siegmund Lubin, that concentrated sunlight started the fire. His comments circulated to various news outlets soon after the fire. The popular trade paper Variety quotes him in its June 19 article "Lubin's Big Blaze":

Some of the films which were destroyed had never been released. Others cannot be reproduced or duplicated. Our loss on films will be at least $500,000 and on the vault about $5,000. The only explanation I can give for the explosion and fire is that the sun coming through a window [skylight] so heated one of the tin cylinders holding a film that it exploded, setting the others off.

Three weeks later in a separate interview with reporter W. Stephen Bush, which was published in the July 11 issue of The Moving Picture World, Siegmund Lubin reiterates Ira Lowry's comments about the fire's origins, although his statement, like his son-in-law's, is not delivered with any certainty or conviction. "The fire", Lubin states, "will be a lesson and we will know where to store negatives the next time." With regard to the fire, he adds, "I don't believe that the fire started by itself" [spontaneous combustion]; "Some rays, may be, got through a prism and started the film burning."

Several industry news sources picked up on Lowry's and Siegmund Lubin's comments and cited them jointly in articles as the most plausible explanation for the fire, if not the "official" reason for the tragic loss of so much material. In doing so, the publications advanced the "roof window" or "prism" theory that sunlight streaming through the thick glass of one of the vault unit's skylights had focused a beam on a film can or open reel in storage. Julian M. Soloman of Motion Picture News describes the theory in more detail in his article in the trade journal's June 27, 1914 issue:

The newspapers all reported the cause as spontaneous combustion, but the theory of the writer, who has installed many thousands of square feet of vaultlights similar to those used in the roof to admit daylight, is that the sun, streaming through one of the prisms of glass, produced the same effect as if a reading lens be held in the sun and the beam of light, being concentrated, set fire to some of the film.

The result was a quick fire which communicated itself to other film in close proximity. All of the prints and negatives were stored in airtight cans and as celluloid is highly explosive when confined, an explosion resulted which spread the fire and wrecked the vault.

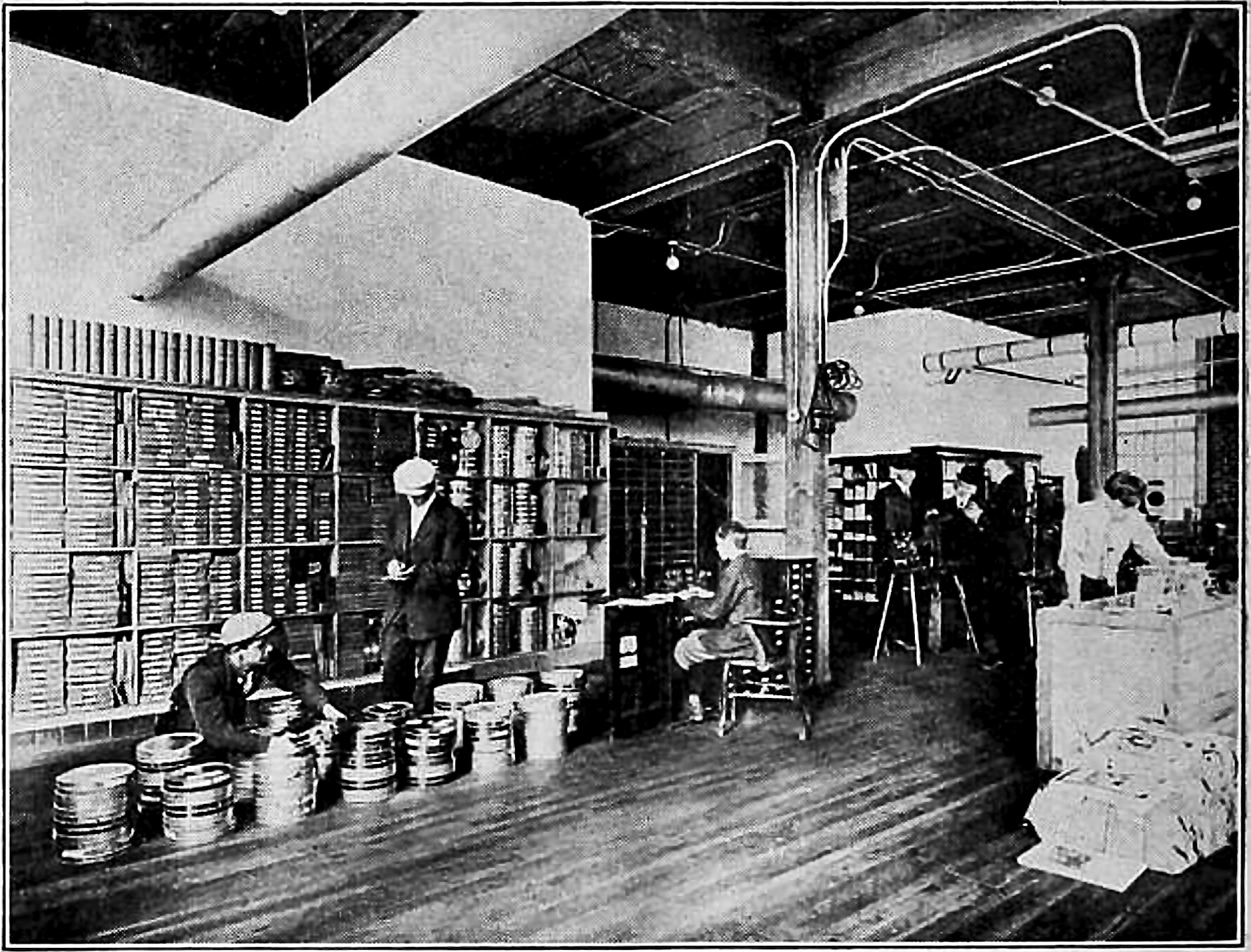
Lubinville's shipping department where a "runner" routinely transported film cans back and forth to the plant's vault

Yet, many of Lubinville's lower-level plant employees never accepted the spontaneous-combustion explanation or the "beam of light" theory since the skylights in the vault were fitted with frosted glass, which would have made the focusing of a beam and the magnification of its heat very unlikely. Instead, as recorded in Joseph P. Eckhardt's 1997 biographical work The King of the Movies: Film Pioneer Siegmund Lubin, employees held to another belief about the cause of the fire, an opinion based on their experience of daily plant operations and their personal knowledge about fellow workers at Lubinville. Eckhardt, as a follow-up, also provides in his book some insight as to why that belief was not officially pursued:

"We just couldn't believe that the heat or the rays of the sun that could only come through this frosted glass...could come through and hit the film and ignite it," recalled Ida Hanneman Breuninger, a Lubin employee for eight years. "We always thought the runner who brought the film from the vaults laid a cigarette down—he was quite a smoker—and there was film around." This possibility was never investigated perhaps because the custodian of the vault was Stanley Lowry, the brother of Ira Lowry. (Note: Ira M. Lowry in 1914 was not only Lubinville's general manager, he was Siegmund Lubin's son-in-law, having married the company founder's daughter Emily in 1908. See Joseph P. Eckhardt's biography The King of the Movies: Film Pioneer Siegmund Lubin, p. 49. ISBN 0-8386-3728-0.) Ironically, the City Fire Inspectors had only the day before examined the vaults and pronounced them safe and sound.

== Losses ==
Whatever the cause of the fire, it inflicted a staggering loss to Siegmund Lubin personally. The motion picture mogul tried to remain publicly the "stoical business man" when discussing the destruction of so many films, but the psychological impact of such a calamity was immediately apparent to insiders in the rapidly expanding film industry, including to reporters for leading trade publications. Motography, in a news article titled "Lubin Mourns Lost Negatives" and published four weeks after the event, challenged its readers to consider that impact. "Imagine, then, if you can", posed the journal, "what must be the loss to [Siegmund Lubin] who is forced to realize that every one of his historic negatives and the first prints of his first pictures are destroyed." Thankfully for his company, at least a portion of recently processed prints survived, having been transferred from Lubinville to labs at the company's Betzwood plant 20 miles (32 km) northwest of Philadelphia. Still, with the exceptions of that transfer, the existence of some Lubin prints that remained in circulation in domestic and foreign theaters, and to smaller numbers of wayward prints and stock footage stored at Lubin facilities outside of Pennsylvania, the flames of June 13 wiped out within a few minutes after the initial explosion the bulk of the company's entire cinematic history up to that day. Lost were small and large reels and film cans containing master negatives and prints for several thousand individual titles. (Note: While no full accounting of the titles incinerated in the 1914 fire was published, the total loss covered 17 years of film production by Siegmund Lubin, who between just 1897 and 1906 created a large catalog of both experimental footage and very short nickelodeon releases. By 1910, his company was producing up to five longer films each week, a pace that on average exceeded 250 theatrical films per year. Adding to that number of annual releases are the many historical and medical films shot by Lubin up to mid-1914. By the time of the company's bankruptcy in September 1916, the studio had produced "nearly five thousand films". Today less than 200 of Lubin's films are known to survive. See Linda Kowall-Woal's biography "Siegmund Lubin: The Forgotten Filmmaker" in Pennsylvania Heritage, Winter 1986. Harrisburg: Pennsylvania Historical & Museum Commission.) Film types ranged from Siegmund Lubin's early and very brief experimental films to longer documentary footage on an array of subjects, along with pristine copies of the company's regular theatrical releases and of pictures produced by some other studios.

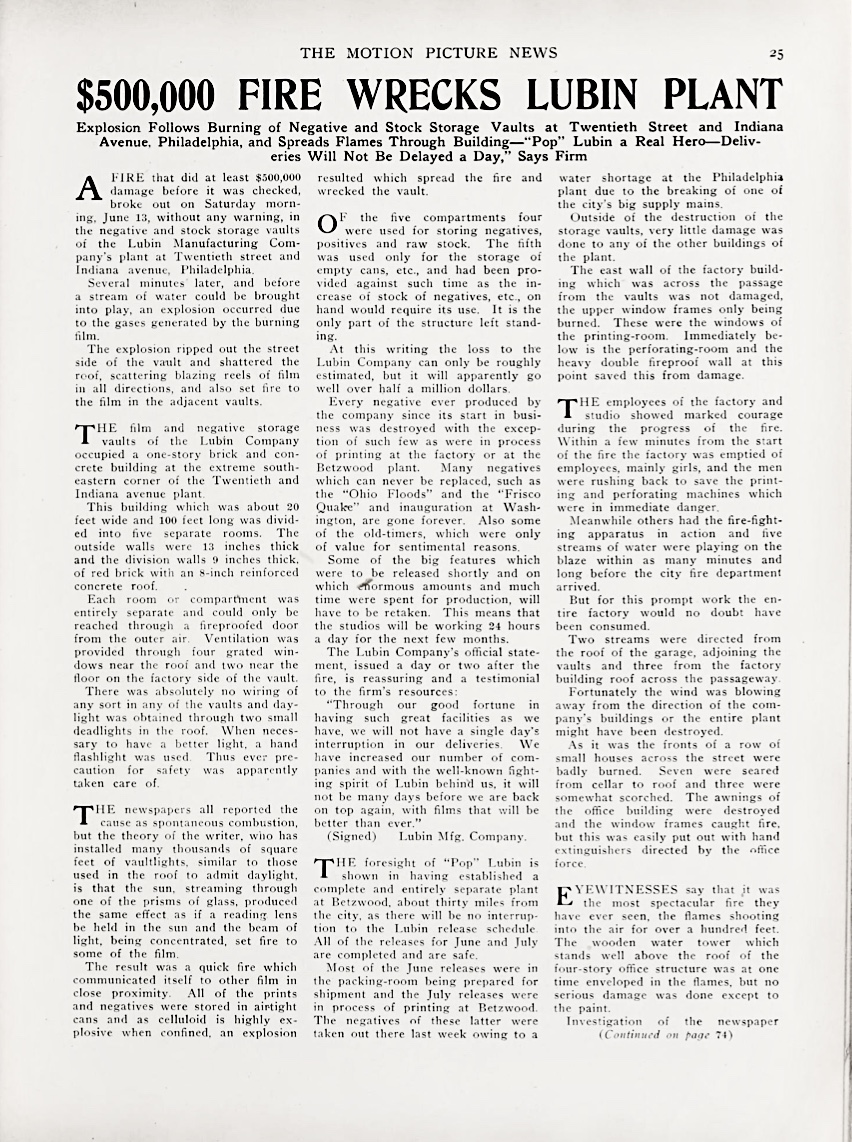
One of many articles about the disaster in 1914 trade publications

Monetary recoveries for the motion pictures lost by Lubin were not possible in 1914, as fire insurance coverage was not generally available for "the dangerous and unpredictable nitrate film stock". The estimated commercial value of the destroyed uninsured films was reported in news sources to be between $500,000–1,500,000 (equivalent to $16,070,000–48,210,000 today). Additional costs for repairs to other areas of the plant were estimated to range between $10,000 ($320,000 today) and $50,000 ($1,610,000). All of those unexpected costs and other related expenses proved to be an "unbearable financial disaster" at that time for the Lubin Company, which was borrowing substantial amounts of money to finance its plans to produce longer, more elaborate films and to complete construction projects already under way at Betzwood and at the company's other properties. Borrowed sums were also needed to cover the financial drain caused by ongoing court battles on copyright and patent lawsuits filed against Lubin by Thomas A. Edison, Inc.

Estimated total material costs and other financial losses from fire, smoke, and water damage continued to climb in the aftermath of the disaster. The New York Times reported that overall losses could eventually be as high as $2,000,000 ($64,290,000 today), an amount that few motion picture studios in 1914 could absorb without considerable hardship. In addition to the vault units' destruction and the total loss of their contents, there were varying degrees of damage across the Lubin property as well as liability expenses for collateral damage to neighboring properties. Private vehicles on the street had been destroyed, and, according to Motion Picture News, the fronts of 10 two-story private row houses across from the vaults burned, seven of them being "seared from cellar to roof" and three others being "somewhat scorched". The Moving Picture World, however, documented even greater damage to nearby residential properties, reporting that 16 houses "were almost wholly destroyed and a score of others were damaged."

=== Injuries and deaths ===
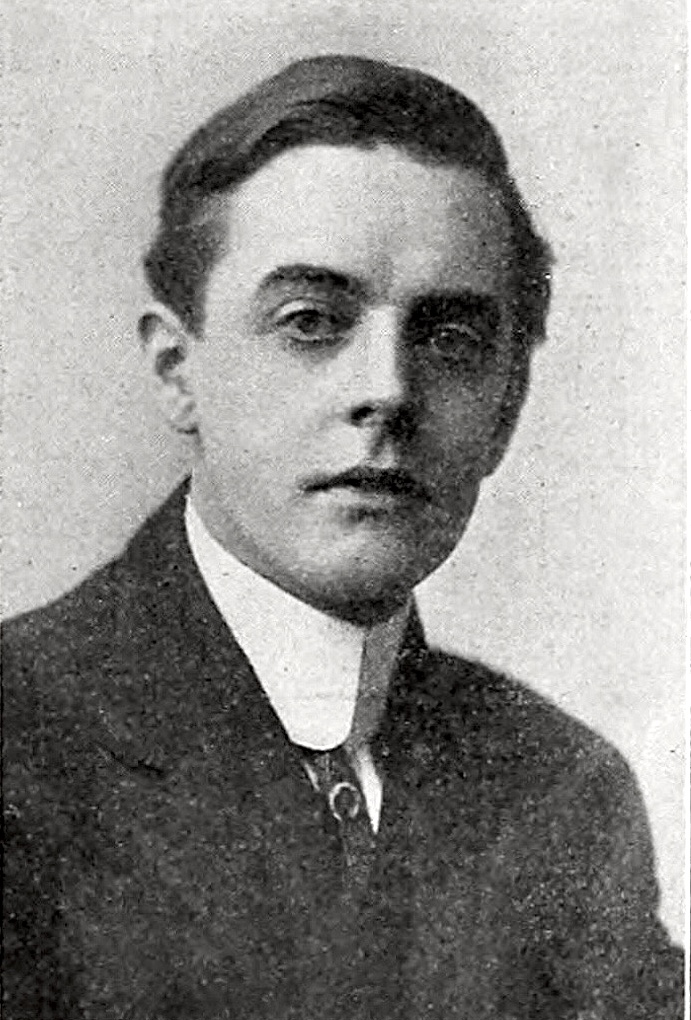
Actor Harry Myers was widely praised for his "heroism" during the fire.

Miraculously, given that the powerful explosions and intense fire occurred mid-morning on a Saturday, with several hundred people working at Lubinville and numerous residents living close to the plant, casualties were overall very light. Only 20 employees suffered physical injuries, largely minor ones. Safety procedures and the substantial firewall between working areas inside the plant and the destroyed vault units outside were credited with saving many lives. However, one person near the Lubin property, a 10-year-old "Italian boy" named Ray Eidio, was hospitalized after being severely burned. A reel of flaming film hurled by the blast toward a nearby row house had struck the child. Lubin actor Harry Myers, already credited in the press for fighting fires on the plant's rooftops, was further praised for aiding the boy at the scene. Variety reported that once Myers saw the child on fire, the actor ran to him, smothered the flames with his own coat, and carried the youngster "through one of the blazing houses" to safety at a nearby drug store, "where an ambulance was summoned." Myers in that action suffered burns to his hands and arms. News updates did not confirm whether young Didero died, but The New York Times and other papers repeatedly referred to him as "dying" and "not expected to recover".

=== Losses from Lubin's pre-1914 catalog and films from other studios ===
Beyond the human toll of injuries and one probable fatality, the fire wiped out a huge collection of films that was described even in contemporary trade publications as "priceless". Those losses included nearly all of Lubin's pre-1914 catalog, approximately 100 newsreels that were ready for release, along with the master negatives and test prints for the Hobart Bosworth Productions Company, the Jesse L. Lasky Feature Play Company, and for D. W. Griffith, a director of major film projects for Mutual Film and Reliance-Majestic Studios in California. (Note: When Lubinville processed theatrical prints for other smaller studios, the master negatives for those productions were also stored in the plant's vault. See "Devastating Fire at Lubin Plant", The Billboard (Cincinnati, Ohio), June 20, 1914, p. 78.) Another loss was the master negative and original archived print for the comedy short Outwitting Dad, Oliver Hardy's first credited screen performance. (Note: Although Outwitting Dad is classified today as lost, copies of Lubin's 1914 short The Servant Girl's Legacy featuring Oliver Hardy exist. That 10-minute comedy, released five months after the fire, is the earliest surviving screen performance by the legendary comedian. See Simon Louvish's Stan and Ollie: The Roots of Comedy: The Double Life of Laurel and Hardy. London: Faber & Faber, 2002, pp. 94–95. ISBN 0-571-21590-4.) That Lubin production had been initially distributed on April 21, 1914, less than two months before the disaster, and over seven years before Hardy first appeared with Stan Laurel in the 1921 release The Lucky Dog.

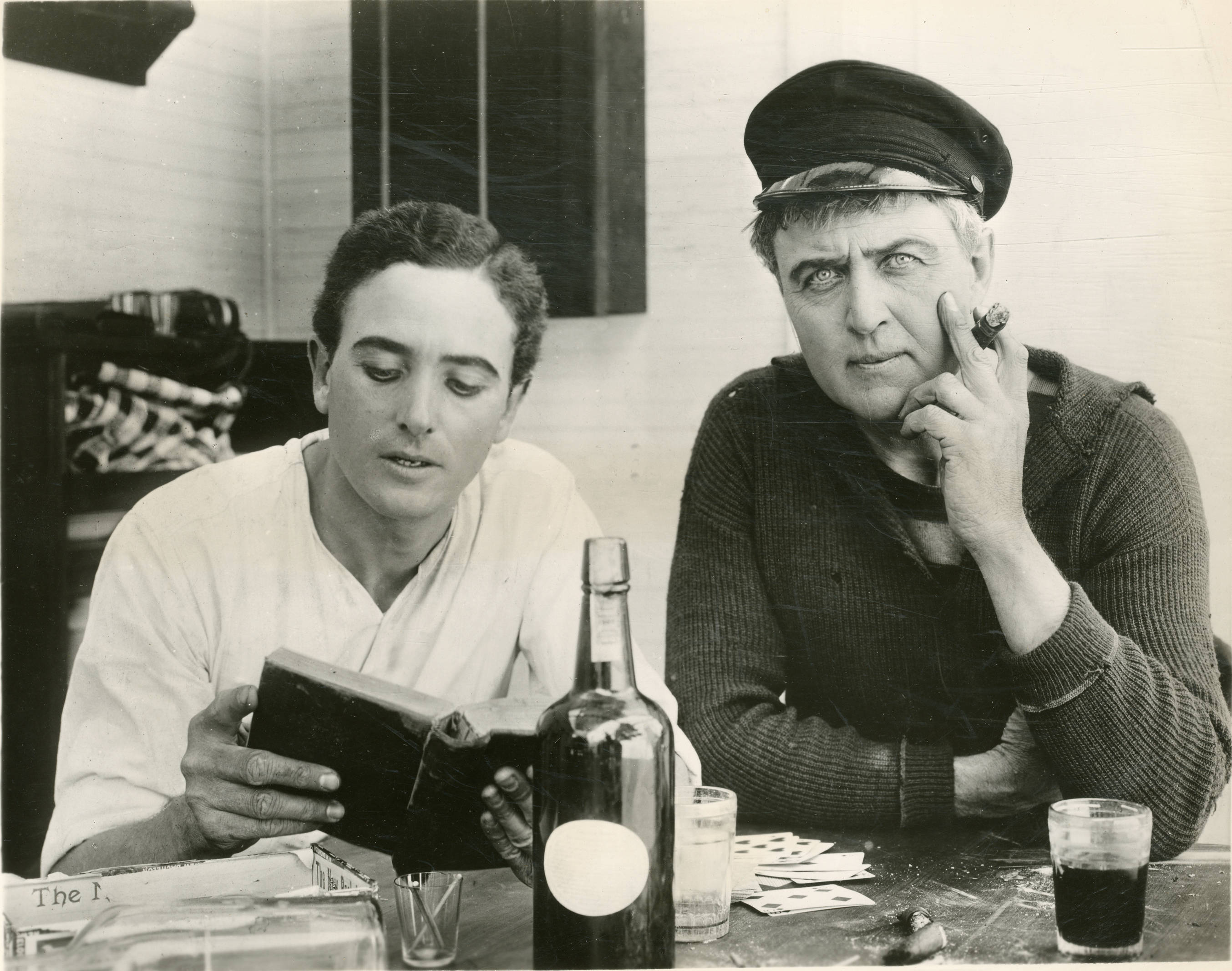
Films stored for other studios burned too, including Bosworth's seven-reel The Sea Wolf (1913), preserved now only in a few stills.

The master negatives for two of Griffith's major 1914 dramas were also consumed in the fire: the "six-reeler" Home, Sweet Home, which premiered in Los Angeles on May 17, 1914, and Griffith's seven-reel adaptation of Paul Armstrong's play The Escape, already in limited released less than two weeks before the fire. Griffith had sent the negatives of both films to Lubinville so the Philadelphia company could process higher-quality prints of them for the director and for wider theatrical distribution. (Note: As a trained ophthalmologist and expert on lenses, Siegmund Lubin was highly respected in the film industry for the clarity and overall quality of the print copies his company produced.) Prints of Home, Sweet Home survive from other sources, but The Escape is classified today as lost. Neither a full or partial print nor even a fragment of footage is known to exist from that film, which actress Lillian Gish, a costar in The Escape, characterized it as a "daring topic" about the horrors of syphilis, a photoplay that Gish said Griffith handled with "power and taste". In June 1914, Billboard, a Cincinnati-based publication that covered the music and film industries, confirmed the destruction of the Griffith negatives and some of the other important films that were reduced to ashes in Lubinville's disaster:

While no definite statement would be issued from the [Lubin] offices, it is known that D. W. Griffiths [sic] had the negatives of his two biggest features, The Escape and Home, Sweet Home, in the vaults which were destroyed today, as well as several others which have not as of yet been announced for release. Michael Strogoff, with Jacob Adler in the lead, which has been extensively advertised by the Popular Plays and Players, Inc., as a big feature film, was destroyed in its negative form, but some prints had already been made and delivered, so the loss is not as serious as that to other producers like Griffiths [sic]. (Note: See "Screen Adaptions" at the cited internal link for "Michael Strogoff".)

=== Examples of other Lubin releases destroyed ===
Lost Lubin titles include hundreds of Siegmund Lubin's early kinetoscopic and nickelodeon releases produced during "the pioneer period of the motion picture industry". Many of those are documented in Howard Lamarr Walls' 1953 reference Motion Pictures, 1894–1912, Identified from the Records of the United States Copyright Office. Among the lists of standard drama and comedy shorts recorded in that reference are screen adaptations of many classics from literature such as Rip Van Winkle (1903), Beauty and the Beast (1903), Gulliver's Travels (1903), Swiss Family Robinson (1903), Snow White (1903), and Julius Caesar (1908). Other lost films include a variety of productions with intriguing, rather strange and unexpected titles from the very early silent era, some that indicate productions with science-fiction, fantasy, educational, and human-interest themes: Trip to the Moon (1899), Sapho (1900), (Note: Lubin's film Sapho [sic] was federally copyrighted on March 8, 1900, five years before Biograph's production A Modern Sappho. See pp. 39, 53 of Motion Pictures, 1894–1912.) Ostrich Farm (1901), Lubin's Animated Drop-Curtain Announcing Slides (1901), A Trip to Mars (1903) (Note: Siegmund Lubin, like many studio owners in the early silent era, often "borrowed" story ideas, blatantly copying motion pictures already released by other filmmakers. Lubin's "A Trip to Mars" was one such film. Although the interplanetary destination was changed in its title, "A Trip to Mars" was a direct copy of Georges Méliès 1902 classic A Trip to the Moon. See Steve Siegel's "Before Hollywood, there was Betzwood", e-newspaper, The Morning Call (Allentown, Pennsylvania), May 11, 2012. Tribune Publishing Company, Chicago, Illinois.) Evolution of the Japanese with the added film description "from a curio-box to a world power in 50 years" (1905), A Dog Lost. Strayed or Stolen. $25 Reward. Apply to Mrs. Brown, 711 Park Ave. (1905), The Life of an Oyster (1907), Miraculous Eggs (1907), The Making of a Modern Newspaper (1907), The Evolution of Man—An Educated Chimpanzee (1908), Baxter's Brain Storm (1907), Acrobatic Pills (1908), Ten Minutes with Shakespeare (1908), A Female Fire Department (1908), The Hebrew Fugitive (1908), A, B, C's of the U.S.A. (1909), Brain-Serum (1909), The Fighting Cigar (1909), and In the Land of Upside Down (1909).

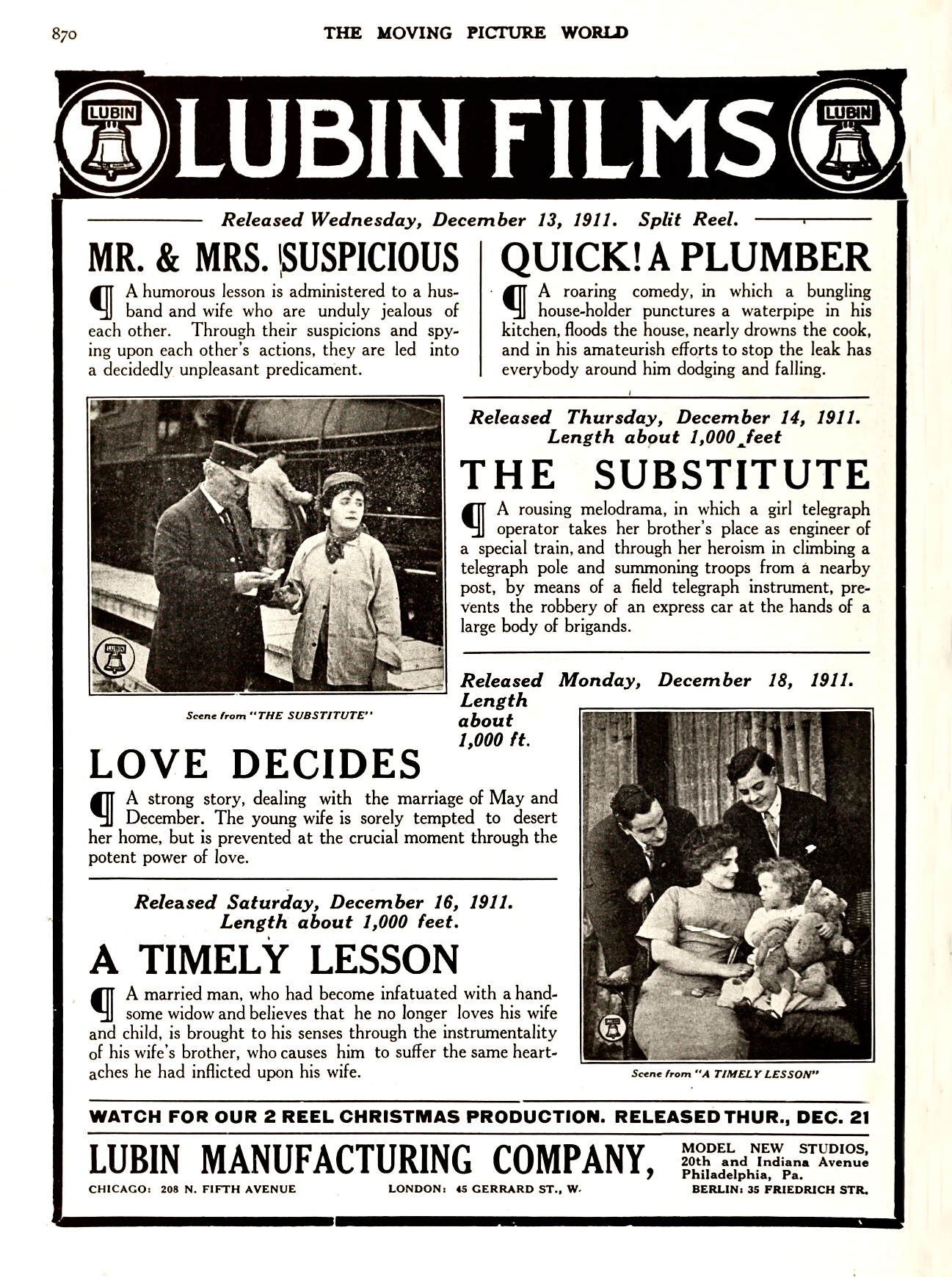
By 1910, Lubin was regularly releasing five or more films a week. The 1911 releases promoted here were also destroyed.

Hundreds of cans of master negatives and reels of initial prints for later Lubin theatrical films—those released between 1910 and the spring of 1914—burned as well. A few examples of those lost dramas and comedies are The Tatooed Arm (1910), A Child of the Sea (1910) filmed in Florida, The Nearsighted Chaperone (1911), The Substitute (1911), The Devine Solution (1912), The Last Rose of Summer (1912), the "powerful and picturesque Indian romance" Back to Primitive (1913), the three-reel drama The Parasite (1913), and a six-reel adaptation of Charles Klein's The Lion and the Mouse released in March 1914. Regrettably, too, the master negatives for cartoonist Vincent Whitman's animated 1914 productions A Trip to the Moon and A Dream of the Circus were among the casualties. Those two lost films, each released as one part of a two-film "split reel" in March and April respectively before the fire, were the first installments in a series of animated shorts that Whitman produced for the Philadelphia studio prior to end of 1915. Although Lubin's A Trip to the Moon carried the same title as Georges Méliès' 1902 groundbreaking sci-fi French classic, the nine-minute 1914 animated comedy portrayed an entirely different story in which the protagonists reach the Moon by "aeroplane" instead of by a shell-shaped capsule propelled by a huge cannon.

=== Documentary films lost ===
Over nearly two decades, Siegmund Lubin had accumulated, either out of personal interest or for their commercial entertainment value, many hundreds of documentary films relating to historical events and notable personalities, from his first 1897 film of a horse eating hay to early 1914. Lubin during that period routinely dispatched roving camera crews "to capture on slide and motion picture film" assorted natural and man-made disasters and footage of prominent individuals and major political, military, and social events. Soon after the fire, Mr. Lubin was generally reluctant to discuss the magnitude of the films destroyed, but he did express regret about the destruction of some particular footage in one interview:

You know I am sorry for the loss of some of our historic records. We had pictures of [President] Cleveland and of McKinley and of ex-Vice-President Stevenson, who has just died. We had pictures, too, of Schley and Dewey. I happened to be in Buffalo at the time when McKinley was shot and I myself took some interesting scenes.

More important documentary footage lost in 1914 was Lubin's recordings of the 50th anniversary of the Battle of Gettysburg, the American Civil War's pivotal clash between Confederate and Union forces that occurred in 1863 only 125 miles (201 km) west of Philadelphia. Lubin's camera crews traveled to the Gettysburg battlefield in 1913 and over the first three days of July filmed "'the greatest of all reunions'". The footage they shot, all of which would burn less than a year later, was used to produce a final one-reel, 15-minute release. That final cut included both grand ceremonies and personal moments: the arrival at Gettysburg of 55,000 war veterans, sweeping views of the attendees' huge encampment, parades of former high-ranging officers and enlisted troops, meetings of old field nurses, and scenes of various "Yankees and Rebels shaking hands".

With regard to other lost documentary films, the following list provides a sampling of losses and the range of their content: (Note: The given list of destroyed documentary films is a selection drawn from the already-noted references The History of Motion Pictures, 1894—1912 and The King of the Movies: Film Pioneer Siegmund Lubin, along with a compilation of losses cited in various 1914 news reports.)

- Dedication of the George Washington Monument in Philadelphia's Fairmount Park, attended by President William McKinley (1897)
- President McKinley at Camp Alger with his cabinet (1898)
- United States General Nelson A. Miles with his staff and "several Naval Commanders of the Spanish-American War" (1898)
- The Windsor Hotel Fire in New York City (1899)
- The Transvaal War (Second Boer War, 1899–1902) in South Africa
- The Hoboken Docks Fire that killed 326 people (1900)
- The "killer hurricane" of Galveston, Texas (1900)
- The Paris Exposition (1900)
- The Republican National Convention in Philadelphia (1900)
- The Pan-American Exposition in Buffalo, New York, where President McKinley was assassinated (1901)
- Footage of President McKinley being taken to an ambulance after being shot by Leon Czolgosz (1901)
- The Funeral of President McKinley (1901)
- A Panorama of a Philippine Village (1901)
- Footage of the bombardment of Port Arthur during the Russo-Japanese War (1904–1905)
- Fire in New York's Bowery (1905)
- The San Francisco Earthquake (1906) (Note: A few minutes of Lubin's extensive footage documenting the aftermath of the 1906 San Francisco earthquake survive, including panoramic footage taken by the studio's cinematographer Jack Frawley. That partial copy, which was produced from the master negatives later destroyed in the fire, is preserved in the Library of Congress under the title "The San Francisco disaster".)
- Military Parade, Founders Week Celebration in Philadelphia (1908)
- Pagliacci, film of Ruggero Leoncavallo, Italian composer and librettist (1909)
- The Cotton Industry of the South (1909)
- The Carnival of Venice (1909)
- Yellowstone Park (1909) (Note: A portion of this Yellowstone film—a 79-foot rolled paper print submitted by Lubin in 1909 to the United States government for copyright registration—also survives in the Library of Congress, along with paper rolls of 18 other pre-1912 Lubin titles copied before the destruction of their master negatives in the 1914 fire. Search "Glimpses of Yellowstone Park" and "Lubin" for other films listed in Kemp R. Niver's extensive reference Early Motion Pictures: The Paper Print Collection in the Library of Congress. Washington, D.C.: Motion Picture, Broadcasting, and Recorded Sound Division, Library of Congress, 1985, p. 121. ISBN 0-8444-0463-2.)
- The Great Ohio Flood (1913)
- Funerals of various "foreign monarchs" (1902–1913), films that reportedly "had a large commercial interest abroad"

=== Unique athletic and medical science films ===
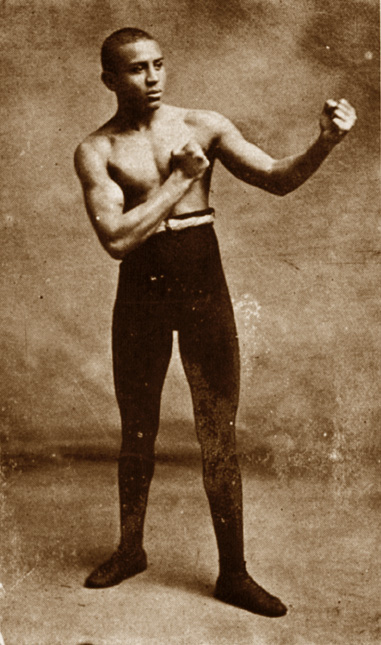
Among the losses of historic films was footage of many of the period's top professional athletes, including Joe Gans, the first African-American World Boxing Champion of the 20th century.

More historical footage lost in the fire is listed in the previously cited reference Motion Pictures, 1894–1912 by Howard Lamarr Walls and in the July 11, 1914 issue of Motography, which describes a wide range of Lubin films that documented medical innovations, scientific discoveries, and professional athletic competitions that were incinerated in the disaster. Lubin possessed genuine footage as well as staged reproductions of famous turn-of-the-century title and non-title bouts involving fighters such as George Dixon, Joe Gans, Terry McGovern, Young Corbett II, and other boxing champions. Also destroyed were films of early baseball games, one of many being "the crucial game of the baseball season of 1902, when Rube Waddell pitched the Philadelphia Athletics to their first American League championship".

Siegmund Lubin held lifelong interests in medicine and the natural sciences, interests instilled in him as a young man during his university studies in Germany, at Heidelberg, where he earned a degree in ophthalmology before emigrating to the United States in 1876 and finally settling in Philadelphia seven years later. His training in the anatomy of the human eye and his practical experience in manufacturing optical lenses led to Lubin's fascination with cameras and a growing expertise in the technology of still photography and then, by the late 1890s, in the new medium of moving pictures. By the time he formally established the Lubin Manufacturing Company in 1902, Lubin was already experimenting with filming through different lenses and capturing moving images through microscopes and early x-ray cameras and later, in cooperation with Philadelphia's medical community, documenting surgeries, blood transfusions, and assorted ailments and debilitating disorders of many patients at local hospitals and in mental health facilities. Publicly, he was increasingly credited for personally expending "a great deal of money and much of his spare time" promoting the use of moving pictures for scientific purposes and, more specifically, in using films as a teaching tool for surgical training.

All of Lubin's medical films shot prior to the fire were destroyed. While there is no full accounting of those motion pictures or of other science-related footage stored in the demolished vault units, the titles and general descriptions of their content can be found in several published references. For instance, in the April 15, 1911 issue of The Moving Picture World, in a news feature titled "Pictures in Aid of Medical Science", the journal highlights how a few of Lubin's now-lost medical films were used:

The latest assistance given by the Lubin Manufacturing Company to the medical fraternity was in the illustration of a lecture by the widely known nerve specialist, Prof. Theodore H. Weisenburg, on "The Gait, Station, Tremors and Other Symptoms of Various Forms of Nervous Diseases," delivered to the Alumni Association of the Department of Medicine of the Medico-Chirurgical College in the Clinical Amphitheatre, Eighteenth and Race Streets, Philadelphia, Penna., on March 21. The Lubin Company furnished for this occasion a twelve-hundred-foot reel depicting some extraordinary views of a number of patients who had been carefully selected by Prof. Weisenburg...cases of locomotor ataxia, paralysis of one side of the body resulting from a hemorrhage in the brain, different forms of spinal cord disease, hysteria and different tremors and involuntary movements of the body...At the finish of the lecture there ensued a scene of the wildest enthusiasm....

Lubin worked extensively with Dr. Weisenburg, who today is recognized internationally as a pioneer in the use of "moving pictures" for comparative neurological studies and classroom instruction. Along with all the other losses in the fire, the destruction of so many innovative medical films was not only another blow to Siegmund Lubin personally but a true misfortune regarding the visual documentation of early 20th-century medicine and surgical practices in the United States.

== Recovery and new fire regulations ==
To reassure the company's domestic and foreign distributors and for the benefit his employees' morale, Siegmund "Pop" Lubin acted immediately to repair facilities at his plant. The prompt action was also intended to demonstrate to the wider film community and to the general public that the studio would recover quickly and that the fire would not significantly disrupt the studio's existing production and release schedules. Only two weeks after the fire, in its June 27, 1914 issue, Motography reports assertions from Lubin's upper management that the company would rapidly resume normal operations:

Little time was lost after the fire in arranging to repair and rebuild the parts of the factory which were ruined. Departmental managers estimated that it would take only a few days to effect temporary renewal of facilities for turning out photo-plays and a few weeks at most to completely re-establish the factory.

Motography also reports in the cited issue that while Siegmund Lubin himself professed that there would be no "hiatus" in the studio's releases, he did admit that "it may not be possible to replace immediately some of the [recently completed] films that burned." Actions at Lubinville to rebuild the demolished film vault in short order further underscored the company's commitment to a rapid recovery. On Monday, June 15, just two days after the fire, Lubin awarded a contract for a new structure. Clean-up and preliminary design work on the new vault commenced the following day.

Despite Siegmund Lubin's efforts to minimize publicly the damaging effects of the fire and the disaster's effects on him personally, the event detrimentally affected his company's budget and income. Repair and reconstruction costs further depleted Lubin's financial reserves that were already becoming stretched by the company's widespread operations and services, including the ongoing expansion of its new, costly "Betzwood" production plant outside of Philadelphia. The noted loss of master negatives and of some theatrical prints ready for release during the remaining weeks of the summer in 1914 also disrupted and reduced to varying degree Lubin's box-office revenue.

=== Revised film-storage guidelines ===
Siegmund Lubin's acceptance of the skylight theory instead of spontaneous combustion or any employee carelessness as the most likely cause of the disaster factored into his company's reconstruction plans for a new vault. A new interior lighting system was a priority in the replacement's design, a system of illumination that Lubin said would "not give rise to any such condition that caused the recent fire." Those design plans were several months ahead of revised safety regulations or "consensus codes" recommended to studios in November 1914 by the National Fire Protection Association (NFPA). Founded in New York City in 1896, the trade association focused considerable attention in its new guidelines on "The Storage of Nitro-Cellulose Motion Picture Films". The widespread coverage in trade publications of the highly destructive fires at Eclair, Edison, Universal, and at Lubinville in 1914 likely underscored to the film industry that additional safety regulations were needed for handing, transporting, and storing film collections.

New safety guidelines announced in the fall of 1914 by the NFPA were to be officially adopted by the organization in January 1915, and they included general specifications for film containers, storage cabinets, and for ventilation and lighting systems in vault construction. Perhaps in response to the Lubin disaster and its cited cause, the guidelines addressed specifically the issue of skylights. While the proposed guidelines did not recommend banning them altogether, they did strongly discourage any further use of them in vaults, stating "To prevent abnormal temperature within the vault, glass windows and skylights should be avoided".

== Lubin's bankruptcy and closure ==
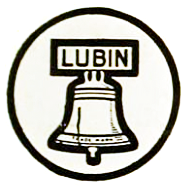
The Liberty Bell logo

By mid-August 1916, slightly over two years after the vault fire, Lubin's mounting debts and dwindling financial reserves prompted creditors to move in and seize control of the company and to begin restructuring and systematically selling off its assets. The fire was certainly not the decisive factor in the studio's takeover and subsequent closure, but it was one contributing factor in a series of problems that confronted the Lubin Company between 1912 and 1916 and hastened its decline. Unlike some of Lubin's main competitors in that period, the company did not adjust as quickly to the changing tastes and expectations of theater audiences, who wanted longer, more elaborately staged films. That lagging response resulted in a decline in box-office revenue, a reduction made worse by political and military events in Europe, where World War I began only two weeks after the vault fire. As that conflict escalated, Lubin and other American filmmakers had to contend with many disruptions in their most lucrative overseas market.

The next year, in 1915, in an effort to improve substantially his company's theatrical releases, Siegmund Lubin more than doubled the production budgets for future screen projects, a move that required more loans and shutting down some operations outside of Pennsylvania to save money. Further exacerbating the studio's rising monetary pressures were the continuing legal expenses needed to defend itself in copyright and patent lawsuits filed by Edison, along with costs associated with countering federal anti-trust prosecutions. (Note: Siegmund Lubin from the beginning of his film-production career gained a reputation in the film community for frequently "pirating" other studios' releases, including those of Thomas Edison, who also repeatedly sued Lubin for illegally producing or refitting his cameras, projectors, and other equipment with patented Edison components. See Eckhardt, pp. 44, 47.) Additional loans and attempts to restructure the business failed. As a result, Siegmund Lubin effectively retired from the film industry in the final months of 1916, and news items the following year began referring to his business as the "old" and the "late Lubin Company". That year both Lubinville and Betzwood, which had continued to operate under receivership, were also sold. Unfortunately for the early cinematic history of the United States, less than 200 of the "nearly" 5,000 films produced by Lubin between 1897 and 1916 are known to survive. The rest are forever lost, falling victim to either dismissive neglect, excessive screenings and mishandling as individual prints moved between theaters, to improper storage, age and nitrate decomposition, or, most notably, to the devastating vault fire of 1914.

== See also ==
- 1937 Fox vault fire
- 1965 MGM vault fire
- 2008 Universal Studios fire
- List of lost films
- Nitrate film
