= White Thunder (film) =

1925 film

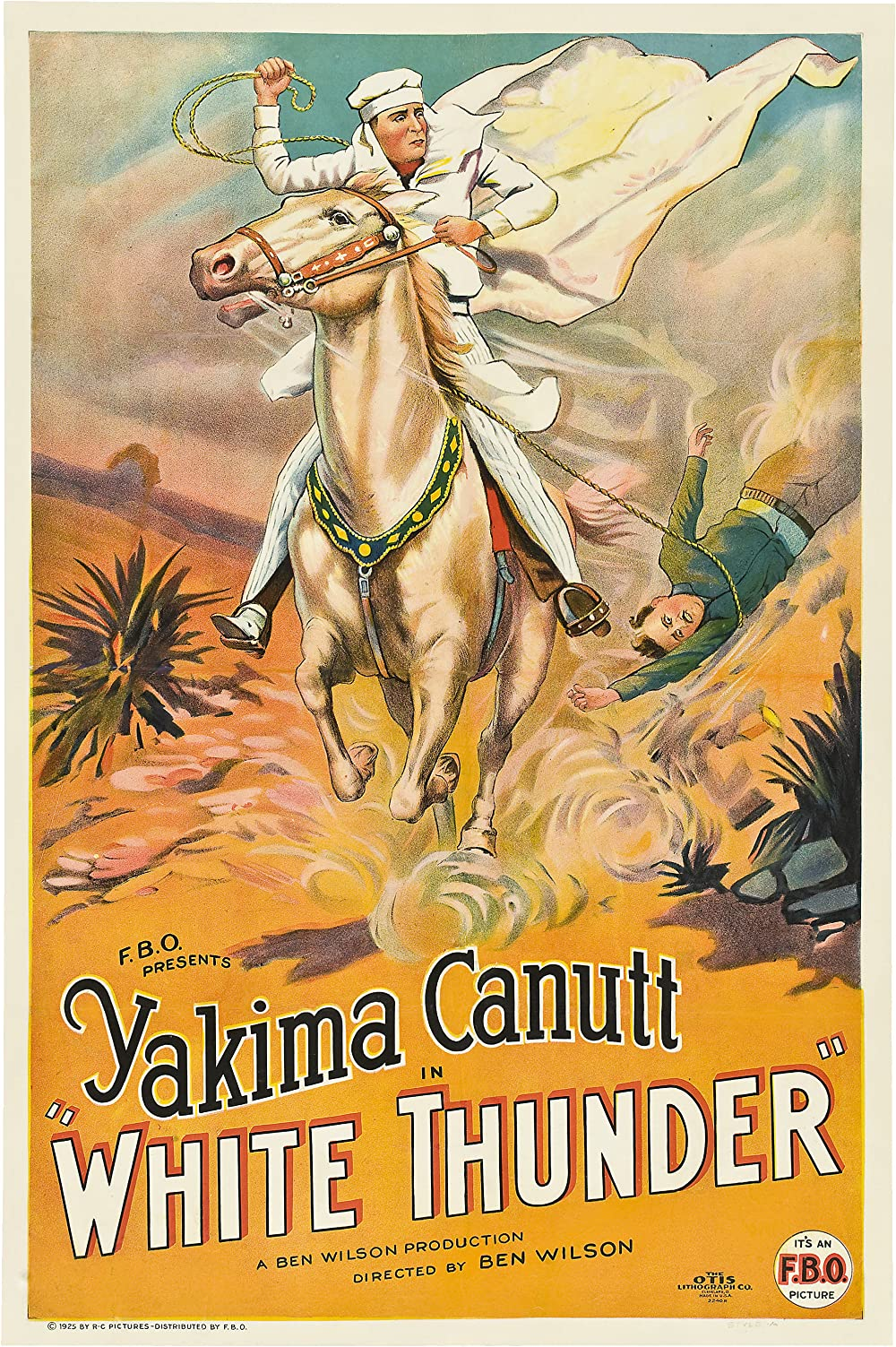
- Film poster
- Directed by: Ben F. Wilson
- Written by: Kingsley Benedict
- Produced by: Ben F. Wilson
- Starring: Yakima Canutt; William H. Turner; Lew Meehan
- Cinematography: Allen G. Siegler
- Production company: Ben Wilson Productions
- Distributed by: Film Booking Offices of America; Ideal Films (UK)
- Release date: May 24, 1925
- Running time: 50 minutes
- Country: United States
- Language: Silent (English intertitles)

White Thunder is a 1925 American silent Western film directed by Ben F. Wilson and starring Yakima Canutt, William H. Turner, and Lew Meehan.

== Plot ==
As described in a film magazine review, shortly after Chick Richards' father, who is the local sheriff, is killed, the youth enters an Eastern college. An ace of spades was on the arm of the murderer of his father. A feud breaks out between cattle ranchers and sheep farmers. A card of the ace of spades is found as a warning to one of the men. Black Morgan's gang is repulsed when the other cowboys are championed by a masked rider clothed in white. Chick returns from college, dressed in white flannels and wearing a cane. His sweetheart Alice and others become disgusted with Chick, because he appears to have no interest in solving the mystery of his father's death. Alice is then attacked by Black Morgan. The rider in white appears, throws off his outer robe to fight Morgan, and everyone sees that it is Chick. Morgan is whipped and he and his gang are put in jail. Chick becomes sheriff and later marries Alice.

== Cast ==
- Yakima Canutt as Chick Richards
- William H. Turner as Charles Evans
- Lew Meehan as Black Morgan
- George Lessey as Sheriff Richards
- Nell Brantley as Alice Norris
- Kingsley Benedict as Rev. Norris

== Bibliography ==
- Connelly, Robert B. The Silents: Silent Feature Films, 1910-36, Volume 40, Issue 2. December Press, 1998.
- Munden, Kenneth White. The American Film Institute Catalog of Motion Pictures Produced in the United States, Part 1. University of California Press, 1997.
