= Destruction (film) =

1915 film

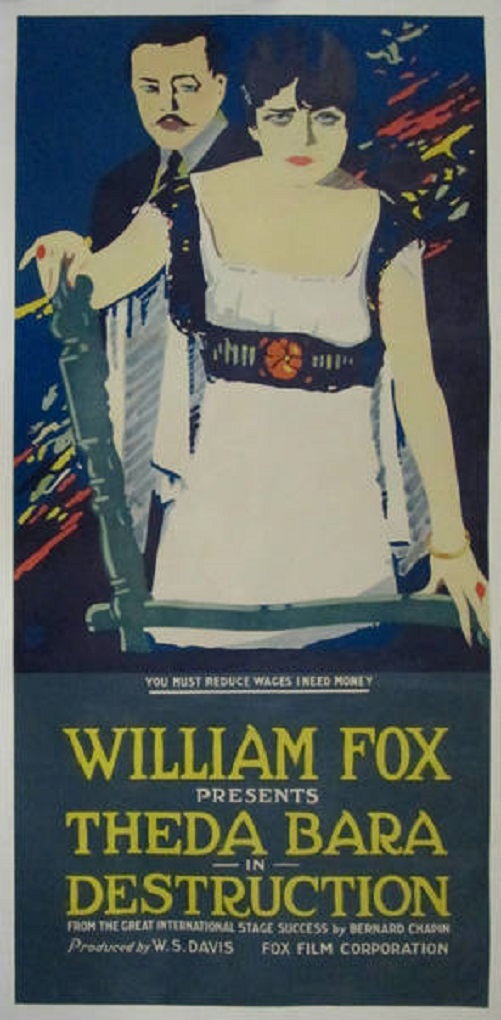
- Poster
- Directed by: Will S. Davis
- Written by: Will S. Davis; Émile Zola (novel)
- Produced by: William Fox
- Starring: Theda Bara; J. Herbert Frank
- Distributed by: Fox Film Corporation
- Release date: December 26, 1915
- Running time: 50 minutes
- Country: United States
- Language: Silent with English intertitles

Destruction is a 1915 American silent drama film directed by Will S. Davis and starring Theda Bara. The film is now considered to be lost. Destruction was probably based on the 1901 Émile Zola novel Travail ("Labor").

== Plot ==
Fernande, a greedy woman, marries a rich old man who is expected to die soon, in order to inherit his money. The husband discovers her intentions but dies suddenly before he is able to change his will. Now a widow, Fernande's next plan is to kill the wealthy's man son who also inherits.

== Filming details ==
Per a period newspaper: "During the making of the riot scenes in "Destruction," a labor drama, two cameramen's assistants and a score of actors and bystanders were injured when three companies of state militia and a troop of cavalry charged the crowds. As a result, when the representatives of law and order charged into the foreground, instead of swinging by the battalion of cameras they swept straight into them. Those most seriously injured were "Banty" R. Tuttle, an actor, and J. Lud Houston and Feeley P. Royce, cameramen's assistants. Bunnum A. Morse, a spectator, sustained a broken collarbone."

== Cast ==
- Theda Bara as Fernande
- J. Herbert Frank as Dave Walker
- James A. Furey as John Froment
- Gaston Bell as John Froment II
- Warner Oland as Mr. Deleveau
- Esther Hoier as Josine Walker
- James Sheridan as Josine's Brother (credited as Master Tansey)
- Arthur Morrison as Lang
- Frank Evans as Mill Foreman
- Carleton Macy as Charles Froment
- Johnnie Walker (credited as J. Walker)

== See also ==
- List of lost films
- 1937 Fox vault fire
