= Octavia Handworth =

American actress

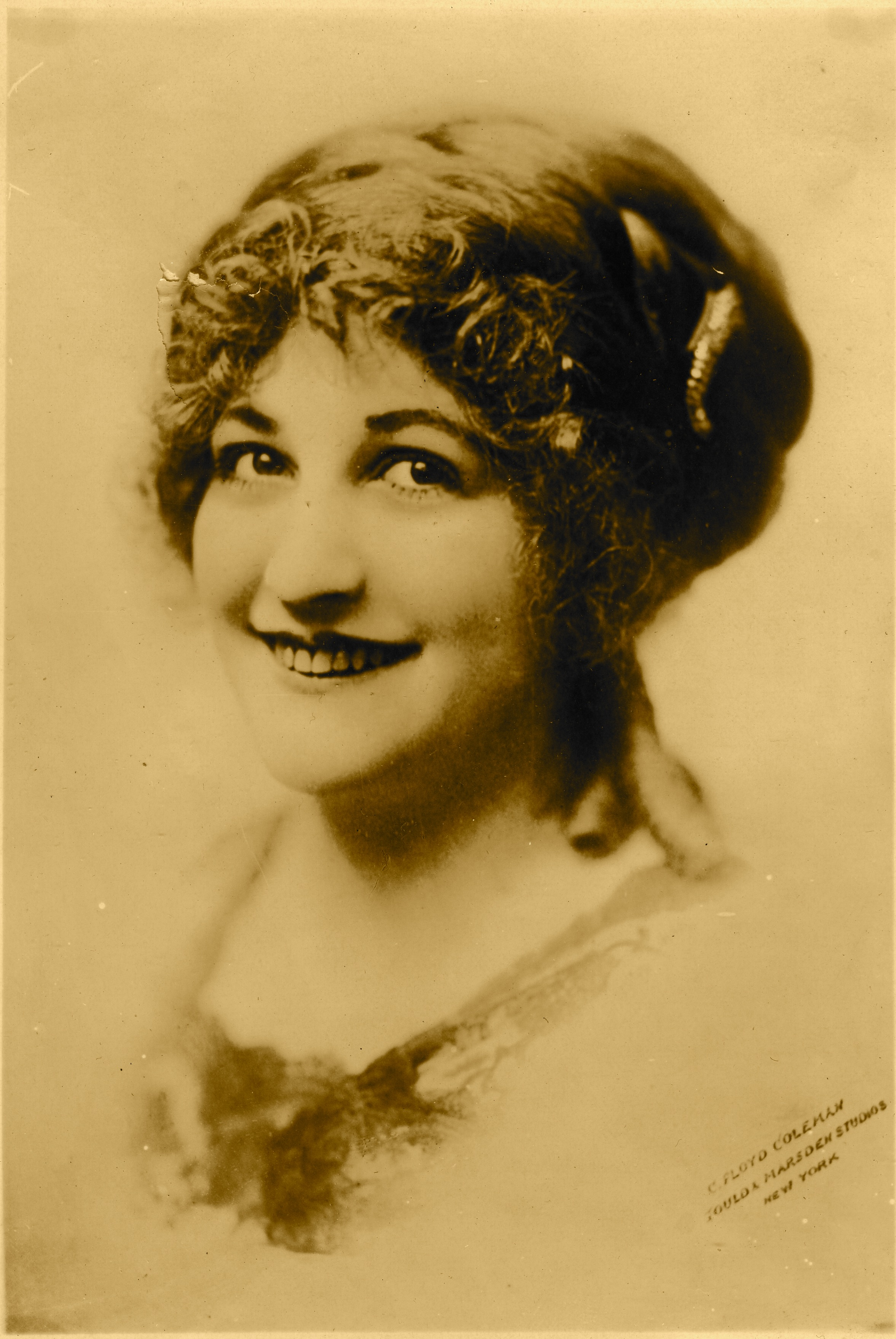
- Born: Octavia Boas; December 24, 1887; New York City, U.S.
- Died: October 3, 1978 (aged 90); Hemet, California, U.S.
- Resting place: Forest Lawn Memorial Park (Glendale)
- Occupation: Actress
- Years active: 1910–1921
- Spouse(s): Harry Handworth (m. 1905 – March 22, 1916; his death); Gordon De Main
- Children: 1, Elsie Handworth (b. 1907, d. 1994)

Octavia Handworth (1887–1978) was an American actress of Danish heritage during the silent film era. She was born Octavia Boas and was married to Harry Handworth (1878–1916), an actor, producer and film director who headed Excelsior Feature Film Co., and Gordon De Main (1886–1954), an actor. Most of her career was appearing in short films, i.e., for Pathe, then Lubin; however, she made half a dozen feature films.

== Selected filmography ==
- How Rastus Gets His Turkey (1910)
- The Girl from Arizona (1910) *short
- The Cowboy's Sweetheart and the Bandit (1910) *short; unconfirmed
- The Motor Fiend (1910) *short
- The Gambler's End (1910) *short
- The Path Forbidden (1914)
- When Fate Leads Trump (1914)
- In the Shadow (1915)
- Too Much Bull (1915) *short
- The Darkness Before Dawn (1915) *short
- The Beast (1915) *short
- The Great Ruby (1915)
- The Son (1915) *short
- The Inevitable Penalty (1915) *short
- Sweeter Than Revenge (1915) *short
- The City of Failing Light (1916)
- The Greater Wrong (1916) *short
- Puppets of Fate (1916) *short
- Sowing the Wind (1916) *short
- Persistency (1916) *short
- The Weaker Strain (1916) *short
- Trials of Souls (1916) *short
- Expiation (1916) *short
- The Lost Paradise (1916) *short
- Race Suicide (1916)
- Footlights (1921)
- Love's Redemption (1921) – final film; not the Norma Talmadge film of like name
