= The Sea Wolf (1913 film) =

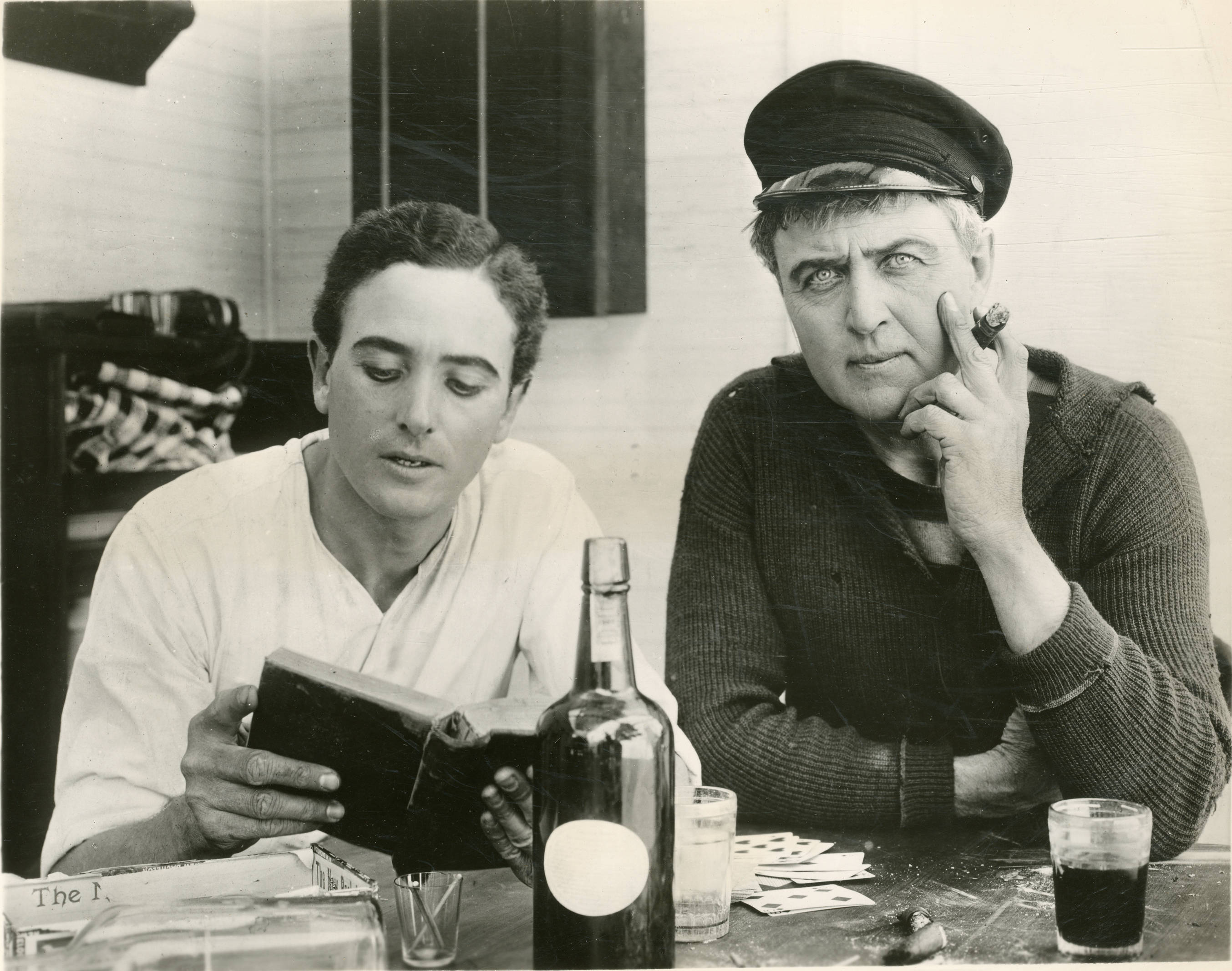
- Still with Herbert Rawlinson and Hobart Bosworth
- Directed by: Hobart Bosworth
- Screenplay by: Hobart Bosworth
- Based on: The Sea-Wolf; 1904 novel by Jack London
- Produced by: Hobart Bosworth
- Starring: Hobart Bosworth; Viola Barry; Herbert Rawlinson
- Cinematography: George W. Hill
- Distributed by: State Rights and later W. W. Hodkinson
- Release date: December 7, 1913
- Running time: 7 reels
- Country: United States
- Language: Silent (English intertitles)

The Sea Wolf is a lost 1913 American silent adventure film directed by and starring Hobart Bosworth and co-starring Herbert Rawlinson. Based on the 1904 Jack London novel The Sea-Wolf, the production's master negatives were destroyed in the disastrous 1914 vault fire at the Lubin Manufacturing Company, the Philadelphia-based film company that Bosworth contracted to produce theatrical prints of his screen adaptation.

== Production history ==
Bosworth previously made a one reel version of the story at Selig directed by Sidney Ayres. It was never released officially. The Balboa company also made a competing version and was sued by author Jack London who had it removed from theatres. Bosworth formed his own company, hired Jack London himself as a cast member, and made this 7 reel version. It was not released until London's legal dispute with the Balboa company was over. In February 1914 W.W. Hodkinson released the film commercially.

== Cast ==
- Hobart Bosworth as Wolf Larsen
- Herbert Rawlinson as Humphrey Van Weyden
- Viola Barry as Maude Brewster
- J. Charles Haydon as Mugridge
- Jack London as A Sailor
- Gordon Sackville as Johnson
- Joe Ray

== See also ==
- List of Paramount Pictures films
