= Stephen Steps Out =

1923 film by Joseph Henabery

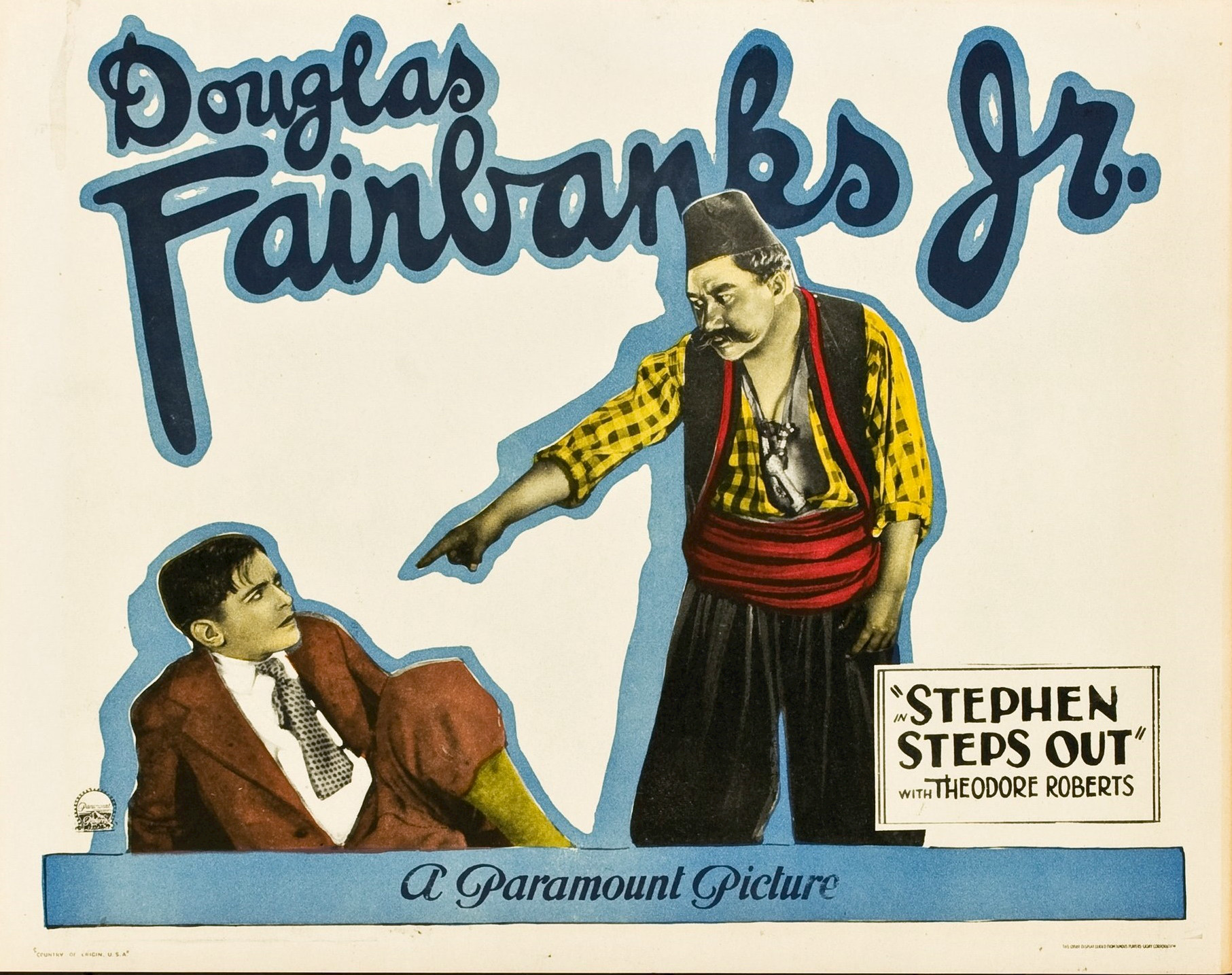
- Lobby card
- Directed by: Joseph Henabery
- Written by: Edfrid Bingham (scenario)
- Based on: "The Grand Cross of the Desert" by Richard Harding Davis
- Produced by: Jesse Lasky; William Elliott
- Starring: Douglas Fairbanks Jr. Harry Myers
- Cinematography: Faxon M. Dean
- Distributed by: Paramount Pictures
- Release date: November 18, 1923
- Running time: 6 reels; (5,652 feet)
- Country: United States
- Language: Silent (English intertitles)

Stephen Steps Out is a 1923 American silent comedy film that is notable as being the first starring role for the still teenaged Douglas Fairbanks Jr. Directed by Joseph Henabery, it was based on a short story by Richard Harding Davis, "The Grand Cross of the Desert."

With this film the young Fairbanks Jr. opted for a screen career despite opposition from his famous actor father, Douglas Fairbanks.

"I was terribly chubby," recalled Fairbanks Jr. "Did it for the money. When my parents separated, it was hardly amicable and mother and I needed to eat. Movie companies were willing to exploit my famous name. I didn't really understand that at the time."

== Plot ==
As described in a film magazine review, the young son of a wealthy American fails his class in history at school, so he is sent to Turkey to learn the subject firsthand on the premises. Upon learning that the instructor who failed him on an examination is facing dismissal as a result, he intervenes to persuade the school board to retain the teacher, having first secured a decoration for him from the Sultan.

== Cast ==
- Douglas Fairbanks Jr. as Stephen Harlow Jr.
- Theodore Roberts as Stephen Harlow Sr.
- Noah Beery Sr. as Muley Pasha
- Harry Myers as Harry Stetson
- Frank Currier as Doctor Lyman Black
- James O. Barrows as Professor Gilman
- Fanny Midgley as Mrs. Gilman (credited as Fannie Midgley)
- Bertram Johns as Virgil Smythe
- George Field as Osman
- Maurice Freeman as Rustem
- Fred Warren as the Sultan
- Pat Moore as the Sultan's Son
- Jack Herbert as Secretary
- Frank Nelson as Hotel Proprietor

== Preservation ==
With no prints of Stephen Steps Out located in any film archives, it is a lost film.
