= William H. Turner (actor) =

Irish actor

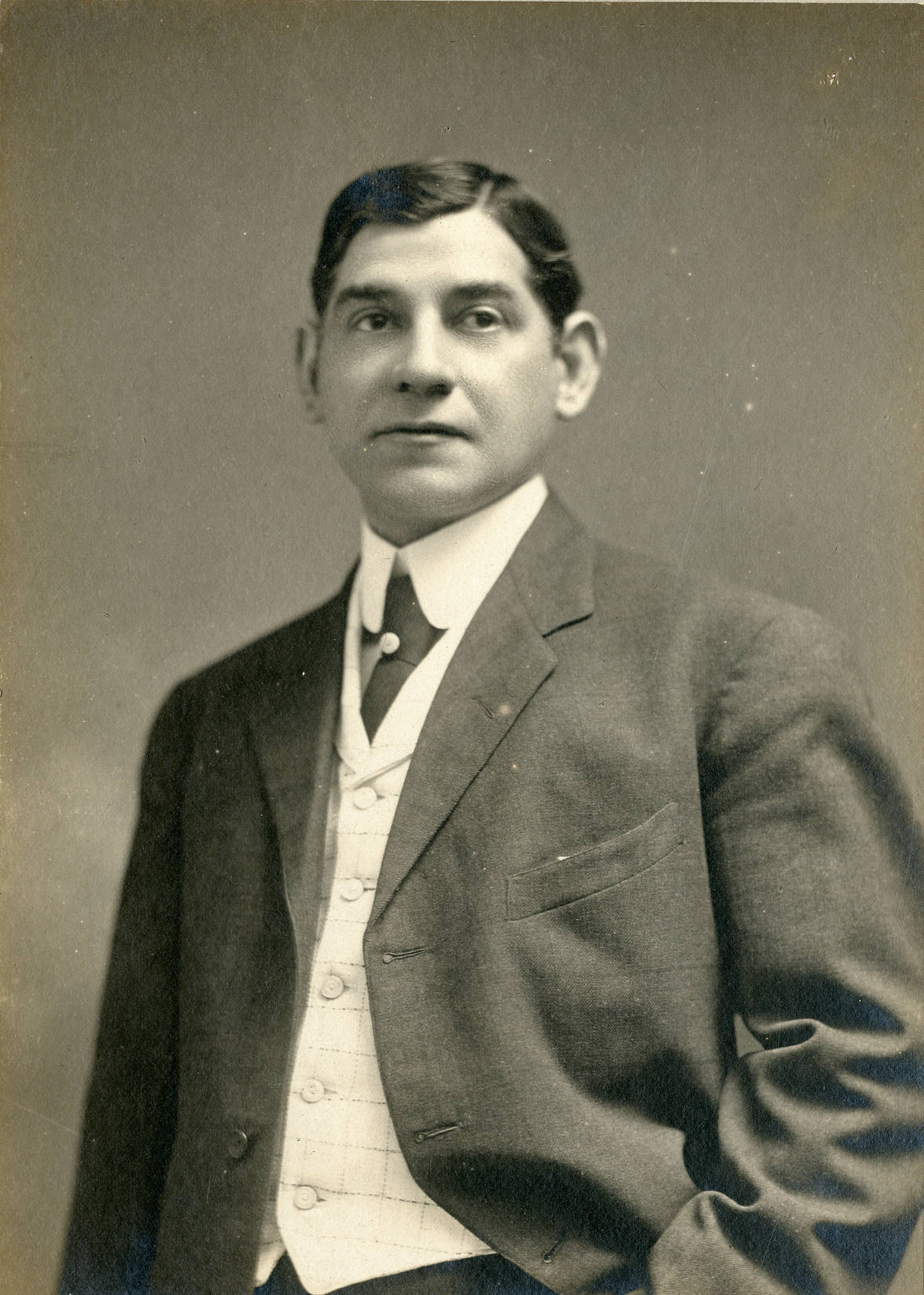
- Turner in 1911
- Born: 21 October 1861; Cork, Ireland
- Died: 27 September 1942 (aged 80); Philadelphia, Pennsylvania, United States
- Occupation: Actor
- Years active: 1913–1936 (film)

William H. Turner (1861–1942) was an Irish stage and film actor who appeared in a number American films during the silent era as a character actor. Born in Cork he was educated at a seminary in Liverpool.

== Partial filmography ==
- Traffic in Souls (1913)
- The Daughters of Men (1914)
- The Great Ruby (1915)
- The Nation's Peril (1915)
- A Man's Making (1915)
- The Gamblers (1915)
- The City of Failing Light (1916)
- The Evangelist (1916)
- The Gods of Fate (1916)
- Her Bleeding Heart (1916)
- Love's Toll (1916)
- Her Good Name (1917)
- The Sporting Duchess (1920)
- The Prey (1920)
- Blow Your Own Horn (1923)
- The Darling of New York (1923)
- The Satin Girl (1923)
- Other Men's Daughters (1923)
- The Measure of a Man (1924)
- Why Get Married? (1924)
- American Manners (1924)
- Fast and Fearless (1924)
- The Garden of Weeds (1924)
- The Gaiety Girl (1924)
- The Enemy Sex (1924)
- Heir-Loons (1925)
- A Woman's Faith (1925)
- Where Was I? (1925)
- The Monster (1925)
- Gold and Grit (1925)
- The Pony Express (1925)
- White Thunder (1925)
- The Warning Signal (1926)
- Red Hot Leather (1926)
- The Texas Streak (1926)
- Her Big Adventure (1926)
- Three Pals (1926)
- The Phantom Bullet (1926)
- Broadway After Midnight (1927)
- Driftin' Sands (1928)
- The Last Performance (1929)
- Love Me Tonight (1932)
- Laughter in Hell (1933)
- Advice to the Forlorn (1933)
- Black Fury (1935)
- Dimples (1936)

== Bibliography ==
- Katchmer, George A. A Biographical Dictionary of Silent Film Western Actors and Actresses. McFarland, 2015.
