= The Great Ruby =

1915 film directed by Barry O'Neil

- Directed by: Barry O'Neil
- Written by: Clay M. Greene
- Based on: the play, The Great Ruby by Cecil Raleigh; Henry Hamilton
- Starring: Beatrice Morgan; Octavia Handworth; Eleanor Barry
- Cinematography: Fred Chaston
- Production company: Lubin Mfg Co.
- Distributed by: V-L-S-E, Inc.
- Release date: September 10, 1915 (US)
- Running time: 5 reels
- Country: United States
- Language: English

The Great Ruby is a 1915 American silent drama film directed by Barry O'Neil, based on the play of the same name by Cecil Raleigh and Henry Hamilton. The film stars Beatrice Morgan, Octavia Handworth, and Eleanor Barry.

== Cast list ==
- Beatrice Morgan as Lady Garnett
- Octavia Handworth as Countess Mirtza Charkoff
- Eleanor Barry as Mrs. Elsmere
- Frankie Mann as Brenda Elsmere
- Jeanette Hackett as Louise Jupp
- Miss Nordine as Lady Garnett's maid
- George Soule Spencer as Prince Kassim
- Peter Lang as Sir John Garnett
- Chauncey Keim as Captain Dalrymple
- Walter Hitchcock as Lord George Hartopp
- Ferdinand Tidmarsh as James Brett
- Howard Mitchell as Longman - The Diamond Gang
- Charles Brandt as Andrews - The Diamond Gang
- James Farrell as Trent - The Diamond Gang
- Douglas Sibole as Duval - The Diamond Gang
- Richard Wangemann as Bentley, Sir John's manager
- William H. Turner as Gooch, Sir John's clerk
- George S. Trimble as Cornish, proprietor of hotel
- Bernard Siegel as Hans, a porter
- Alan Quinn as Landlord of inn
- Clarence Jay Elmer as Jack Chandler, a tout
- James Cassady as Connor, Dalrymple's man
- Walter Law as Duke of St. Edmunds
- Ruth Bryan as Moya
- George Clark as Montyghall
- Edith Ritchie as Princess Wadin
- George Clarke as Montyghall
