= The City of Failing Light =

1916 film

- Directed by: George Terwilliger
- Written by: Anthony Paul Kelly
- Produced by: Siegmund Lubin
- Starring: Herbert Fortier; Octavia Handworth
- Production company: Lubin Manufacturing Company
- Distributed by: General Film Company
- Release date: January 10, 1916
- Running time: 4 reels
- Country: USA
- Language: Silent...English intertitles

The City of Failing Light is a lost 1916 silent film drama directed by George Terwilliger. It was produced by the Lubin Manufacturing Company.

== Cast ==
- Herbert Fortier - John Gray/David Gray
- Octavia Handworth - John's wife
- William H. Turner - Packard
- Leslie Austin - Gray's Secretary (*as Leslie Austen)
- Mary Carr - Mrs. Packard (*as Mrs. William Carr)
- Dorothy DeWolff - Packard's baby
