= William Elliott (actor, born 1879) =

American actor (1879–1932)

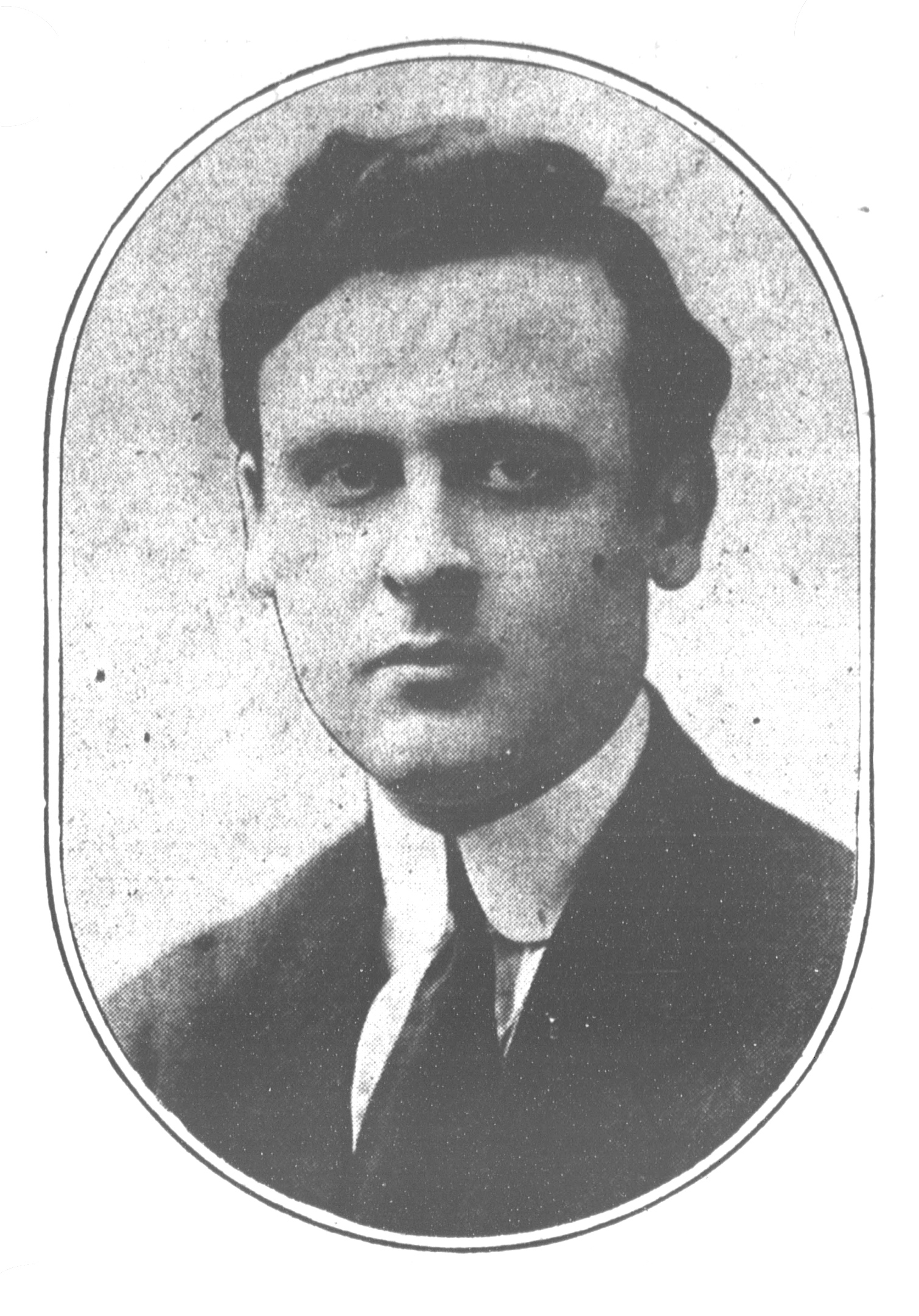
- Born: December 4, 1879; Boston, Massachusetts
- Died: February 5, 1932 (aged 52); New York City, New York
- Occupation: actor
- Spouse(s): Augusta Belasco; Louise Lagrange

William Elliott (December 4, 1879 - February 5, 1932) was an American stage and screen actor.

== Biography ==
The year of Elliott's birth is sometimes credited as 1885. As a child he played violin with the Weems Juvenile Concert Party. He toured in the stage companies of Herbert Kelcey and Effie Shannon, Mary Shaw, and Richard Mansfield. He was one of the most popular leading men in the first two decades of the twentieth century.

He was the son-in-law of David Belasco through his first wife Augusta Belasco. He then was married to Louise Lagrange who previously was wed to French-born director Maurice Tourneur.

Elliot was born in Boston and died at New York City.

== Filmography ==
- The Lightning Conductor (1914) (as actor and producer)
- Face Value (1914) (short)
- The Fortune Hunter (1914)
- The Tip-Off (1915) (short)
- When We Were Twenty-One (1915)
- The Model (1915
- Comrade John (1915)
- Stephen Steps Out (1923) (producer)
