= The Fortune Hunter (1914 film) =

1914 film

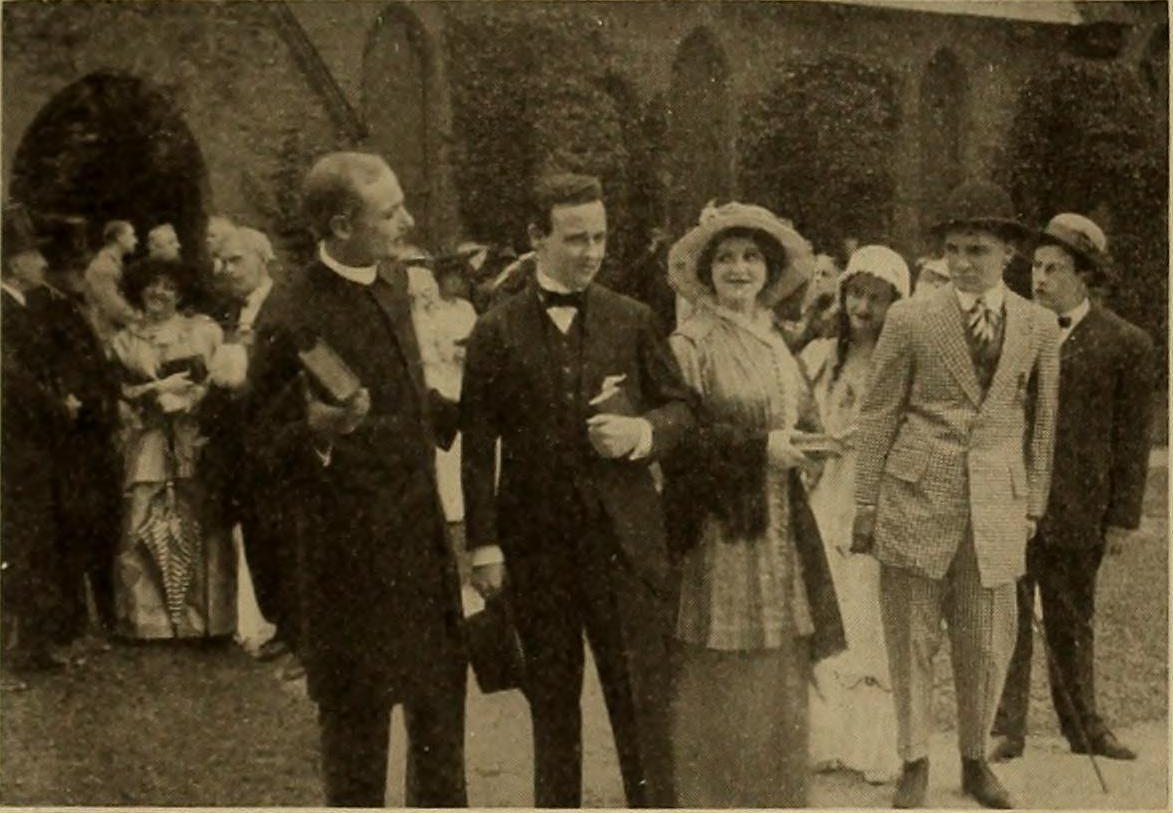
- William Elliott and Betty Brice in a publicity still
- Directed by: Barry O'Neil
- Written by: Clay M. Greene
- Based on: play The Fortune Hunter by Winchell Smith c.1909
- Produced by: Siegmund Lubin
- Starring: William Elliott
- Cinematography: Fred Chaston
- Production company: Lubin Manufacturing Company
- Distributed by: General Film Company
- Release date: October 1914
- Running time: 6 reels
- Country: USA
- Language: Silent..English titles

The Fortune Hunter is a lost 1914 American silent comedy drama film directed by Barry O'Neil. It stars William Elliott and Ethel Clayton, and was produced by Lubin Manufacturing Company and distributed by General Film Company.

This play was an early stage success for Jack Barrymore in 1909.

== Cast ==
- William Elliott - Nat Duncan
- George Soule Spencer - Harry Kellogg
- Charles Brandt - Sam Graham
- Ethel Clayton - Betty Graham
- Betty Brice - Josie Lockwood (*as Rosetta Brice)
- Joseph Kaufman - Roland Barrett
- Florence Williams - Mrs. Lockwood
- James Daly - Blinky Lockwood
- Gaston Bell - Willie Bartlett
- Ruth Bryan - Angie Smith
- Frank Backus - Pete Willing
- Clara Lambert - Mrs. Willing
- Alan Quinn - Tracy Tenner
- Ferdinand Tidmarsh - George Burnham
- Edwin Barbour - Old Hi
