= King-Bee Films =

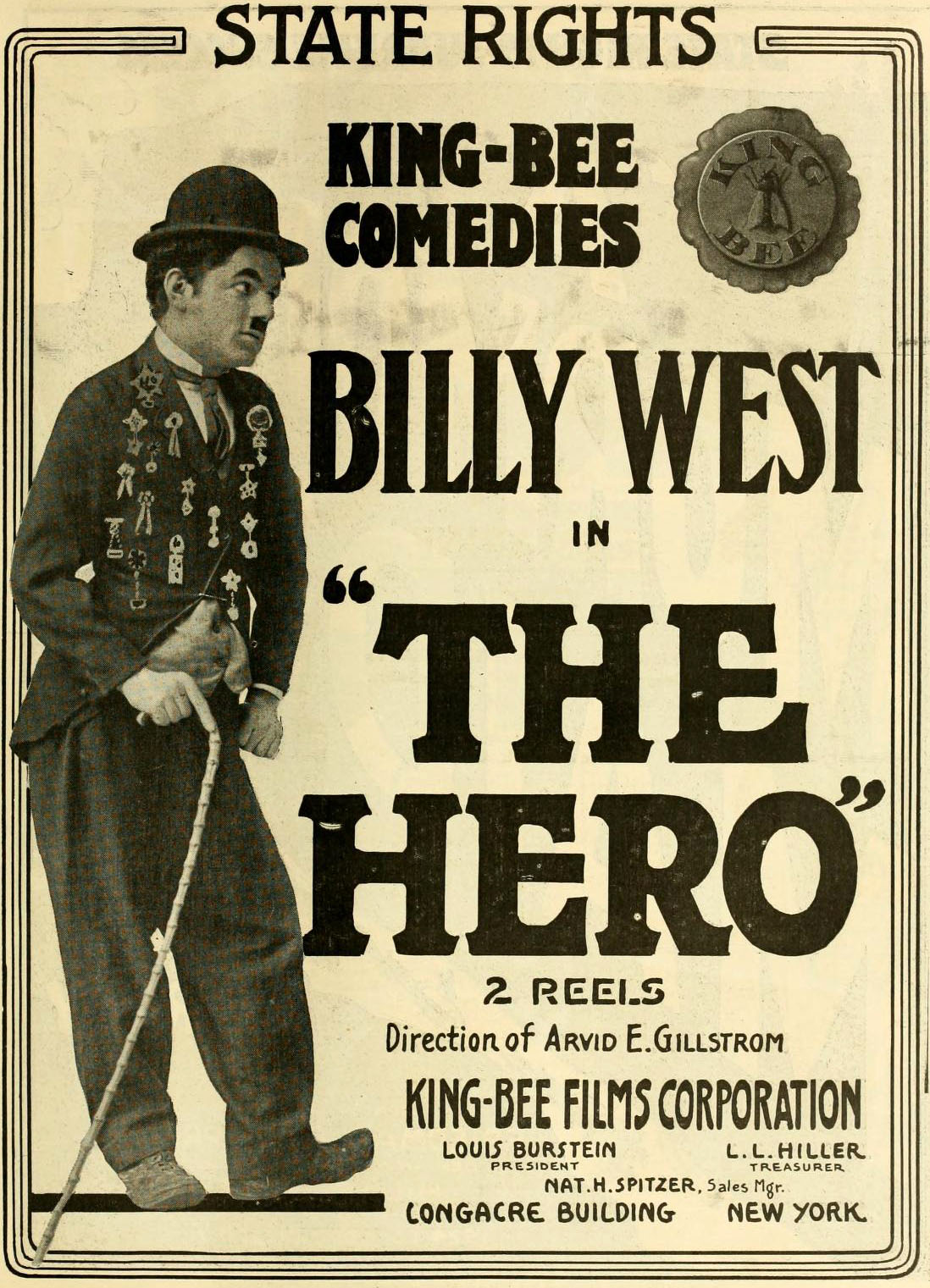
"The Hero" (1917) advertisement

King-Bee Films Corporation was a film production company in the U.S. that released two-reel short film comedies during the silent film era. The company's stars included Billy West, a Charlie Chaplin imitator. Louis Burstein was the company's president and general manager. He established it in 1917 after the breakup of Vim Comedy Company to produce comedies starring West. Oliver Hardy and Ethelyn Gibson also acted for the company. It operated a studio in Jacksonville, Florida, then Bayonne, New Jersey and finally at 1329 Gordon Street in Hollywood, California. Its offices were in New York.

== History ==
King-Bee had offices in New York and Hollywood, California. The company's production sites included Jacksonville, Florida. Arvid E. Gillstrom directed for King-Bee. Members of the company on their way to Hollywood were entertained in Chicago by members of the Standard Films Corporation.

King Bee's Billy West comedies were in such demand it wanted him to work on two at a time.

== Filmography ==
- The Hero 1917 a Billy West comedies film
- The Villain 1917 a Billy West comedies film
- The Slave 1917 a Billy West comedies film
- The Pest 1917 a Billy West comedies film
- The Millionaire 1917 a Billy West comedies film
- Dough Nuts 1917 a Billy West comedies film
- The Candy Kid 1917 a Billy West comedies film
- Back Stage a Billy West comedies film
- The Pest (1917), extant
- The Orderly 1918 a Billy West comedies film
- The Stranger 1918 a Billy West comedies film
- The Messenger 1918 a Billy West comedies film
- His Day Out (1918), extant
King-Bee Films advertisements

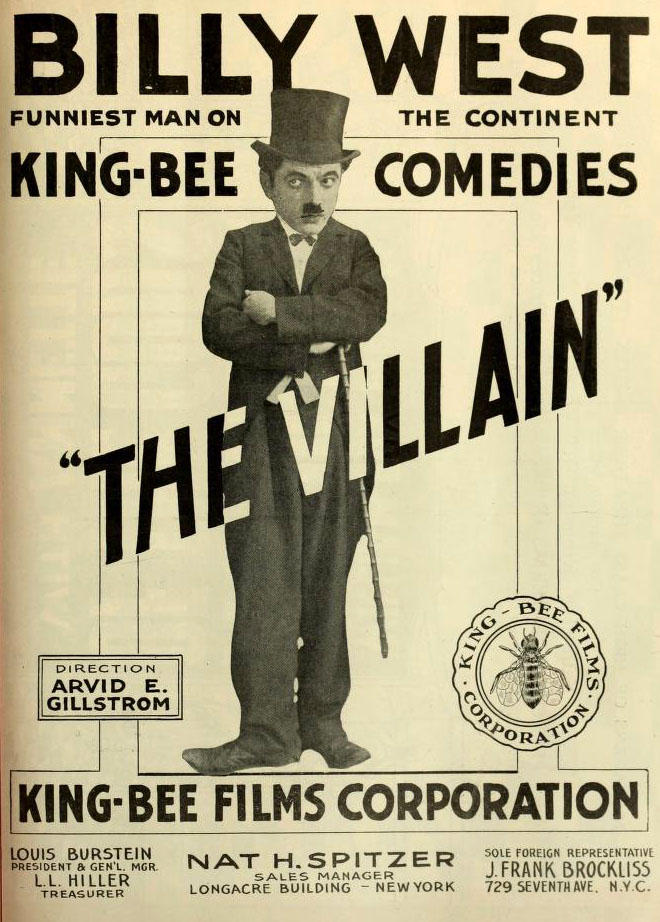

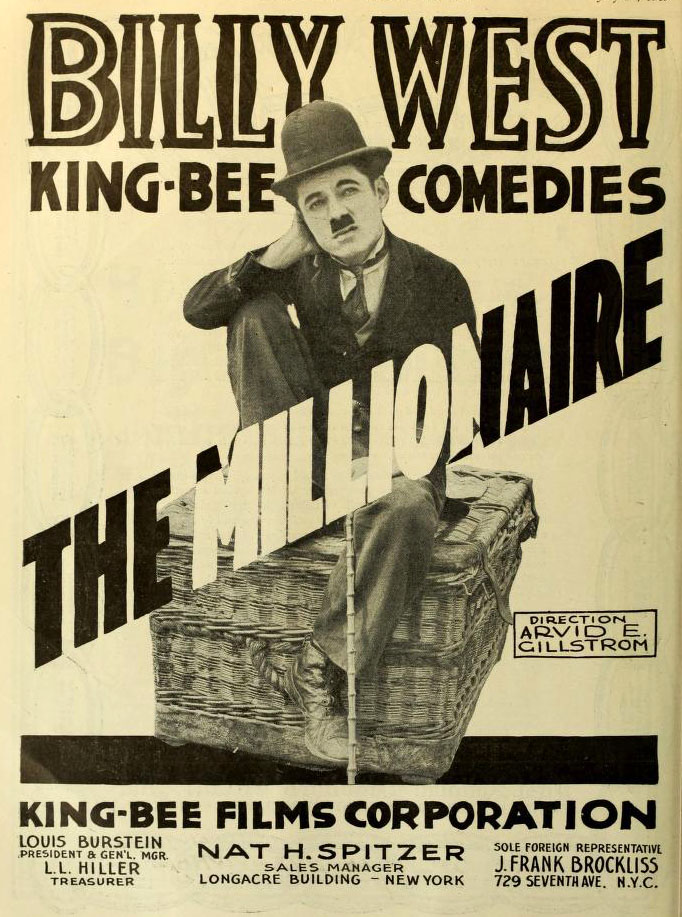

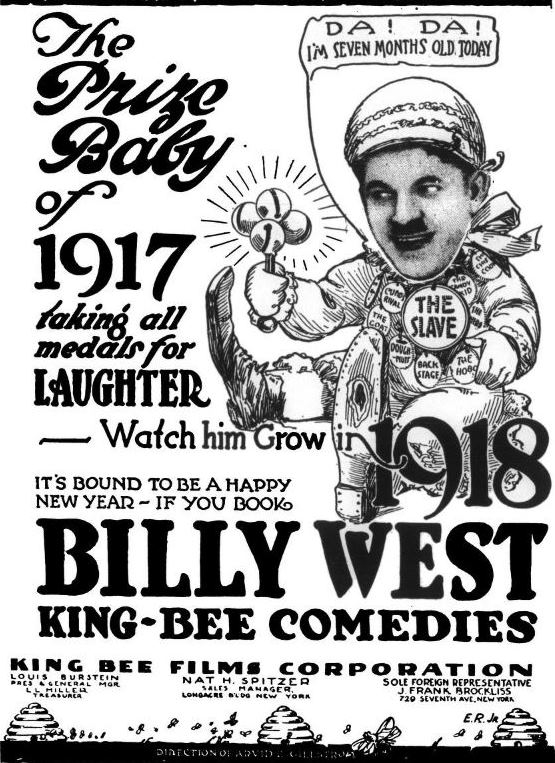
