= Ethelyn Gibson =

American actress

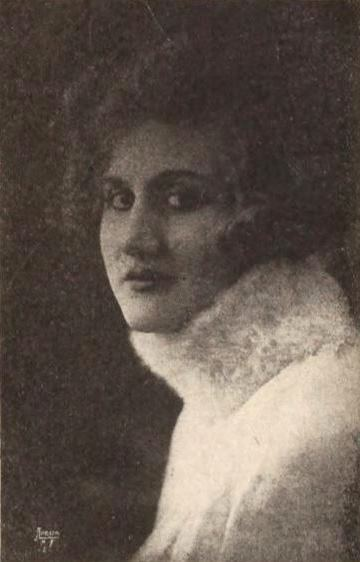
- Photograph of Ethelyn Gibson (1919)
- Born: May 8, 1897; Akron, Ohio, U.S.
- Died: October 18, 1972 (aged 75); Barnesville, Ohio, U.S.
- Other name: Ethlyn Gibson
- Occupation: Actress
- Years active: 1911–1928
- Notable work: Winnie Winkle film series

Ethelyn Gibson (May 8, 1897– October 18, 1972), sometimes credited as Ethlyn Gibson, was an American stage and screen actress who featured in films and productions in the 1910s and 1920s. First joining the theatre through becoming a member of The Charlie Chaplin Revue in 1911, she then became involved in other revue productions as a member of the Ziegfeld Follies. She joined the silent-film industry beginning in 1917, appearing with Oliver Hardy before acting as a leading lady in multiple Billy West films. Later, she also appeared in works with Charley Chase. One of her most famous roles was acting as the title character in the Winnie Winkle series of films from 1926 to 1928.

== Life and career ==
Gibson was born in Akron, Ohio, in 1897. At the age of 14 while living with her parents in Los Angeles in 1911, Gibson had a chance encounter with a Charlie Chaplin film production set in her local park, where she was convinced to take part as an extra. Her successful acting convinced the director to make her a full member of The Charlie Chaplin Revue company and show. She continued in this position up through 1916.

Gibson had her first official stage production outside of revues in 1914 after being recruited by the Ziegfeld Follies and in vaudeville productions until she became involved in the film industry. As a film actress, she worked for the motion picture studio Vitagraph for two years. In 1920, she was signed to be a co-star with West for Equity Pictures and was contracted to make 12 two-reel comedy films. A committee of top American artists rated Gibson in 1923 the "World's Most Beautiful Blonde".

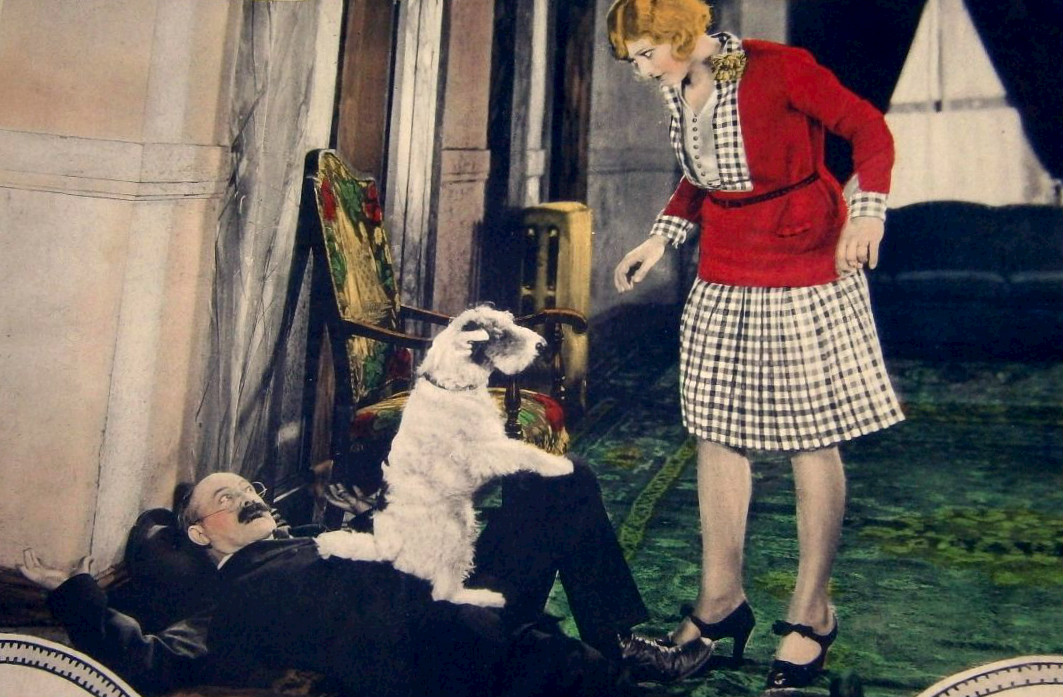
Lobby card for Weary Winnie from the Winnie Winkle Weary film series

Gibson starred as the title character in the Winnie Winkle comedy film series first produced in 1926. The initial run of the films was so successful that Gibson was signed for a further series of shorts. She also concurrently conducted appearance tours in all of the principal cities where she was shooting Winnie Winkle. After completing her run of the film series, Gibson moved on to independent films, setting up the studio Gibson Productions in 1928 with herself as the star of its films, and producing the first serial film with sound called Five Cards.

== Personal life ==
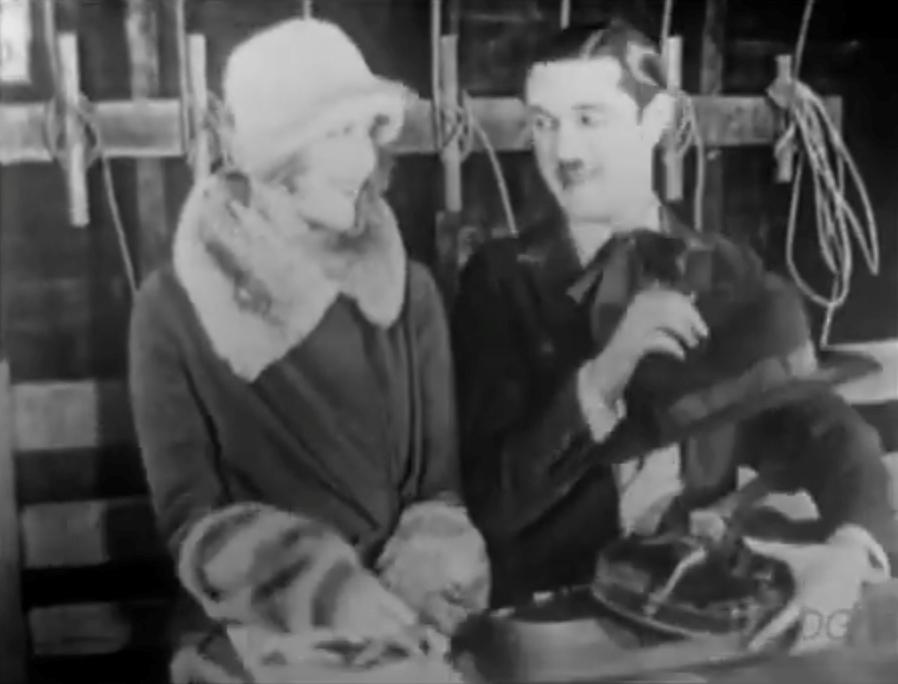
Gibson with West in Fiddlin' Around (1925).

Gibson married Billy West (Roy B. Weisberg), a comic Charlie Chaplin–style actor. She later signed a marriage contract with Michael Glaser, a broker, on November 5, 1926. Two years later, Billy West and Gibson divorced. West alleged that Gibson had left him five years prior and stated that Michael Glaser was the reason for their separation. In 1930, Gibson sued Glaser for breach of promise of their marriage contract. The subsequent case was settled by Gibson for an unknown payment amount from Glaser on May 6, 1930.

She established an organization in May 1930 called "The Divorcee Club" that quickly gained several hundred members. The club advocated for divorced women to have equal rights to married women and to push for proper alimony payments from ex-husbands.

== Filmography ==
- The Candy Kid (1917)
- The Villain (1917 film)
- The Pest (1917 film)
- The Fly Cop (1917) as A Chicken (credited as Ethlyn Gibson)
- The Millionaire (1917 film)
- Back Stage (1917 film)
- Cupid's Rival as A Model (as Ethlyn Gibson)
- Bright and Early
- The Slave (1917 comedy film)
- The Goat (1917 film)
- Playmates (1918 film)
- He's in Again (1918)
- Italian Love (1920)
- Hands Up (1920)
- Cleaning Up (1920)
- Brass Buttons (1920)
- Watch Out! (1924)
- Rivals (1925 film) as Ethlyn
- The Joke's on You (film) (1925) as Wifey (as Ethlyn Gibson)
- "Winnie Winkle" comedy films as title character (1926–1928)
1. Working Winnie (1926)
2. Happy Days (1926)
3. Winnie's Birthday (1926)
4. Oh! Winnie Behave (1926)
5. Winnie's Vacation (1927), extant
6. Winnie Wakes Up (1927)
7. Winnie Steps Out (1927)
8. Winnie Be Good (1927)
9. Winning Winnie (1927)
10. Winnie's Winning Ways (1928)
- The Daily Dozen
- Ladies Must Live (1927)
- Webs of Fate (1927)
- Danger - Divorce Ahead (1927)
- Broken Bonds (1928)
