= The Rogue =

1918 film

- Directed by: Arvid E. Gillstrom
- Written by: Grace Gershon
- Produced by: Louis Burstein
- Starring: Billy West; Oliver Hardy
- Release date: January 15, 1918
- Running time: 26 minutes (2 reels)
- Country: United States
- Language: Silent with English intertitles

The Rogue is a 1918 American short silent comedy film lasting 26 minutes, featuring Billy West and Oliver Hardy produced by King Bee Comedies.

The main character is a carbon copy of Charlie Chaplin's Tramp down even to the details of the bent shoes, thin cane and matching hat. Moreover, the cafe owner played by Hardy is clearly modelled on Eric Campbell.

== Plot ==
A tramp figure dries dishes in a kitchen wearing a woman's apron. He drops a plate and it smashes. He makes more noise trying to brush up his mess. The mistress of the house and her maid hear the commotion and go to investigate. The lady gets a faceful of dust when she opens the door. He takes off his apron and goes to the lounge to help himself to her tea as he is hungry. She catches him and sends him back to the kitchen.

He leaves and goes to a cafe where the manager (Hardy) is trying to balance the till. A customer close to the till goes to the washroom. The tramp takes advantage and starts to eat his meaT. The nan returns and is affronted. He calls the manager over and the manager takes the tramp by the neck and shakes him. The tramp pushes a cake in the manager's face and leaves. The manager uses the table cloth to wipe his face.

The tramp goes to a park and sits on a bench under a willow tree next to a pond. A couple sit next to him. He helps himself to their bag of snacks. The man, a bit of a toff, gets angry. A policeman arrives and the tramp pushes him into the pond. The couple get in a rowing boat. The toff bends over to untie the boat from its mooring. It is too tempting for the tramp and he kicks the toff's backside, launching him into the pond. Each time he resurfaces the tramp pushes him under. The tramp waddles off and the girl helps the toff get out.

The girl leaves the toff and gets in the back of a chauffeur driven car. They drive over the tramp and she gets out to see if he is okay. The tramp feigns to be worse than he is and is put in the back of the car. He gets taken to a large mansion where the chauffeur carries him into the lounge and puts him in an armchair. The girl's father, the count enters, and props up the tramp with cushions. He pours him a large brandy which the girl holds to his lips. He slides off the chair as he drinks. The girl offers him a cigarette from a large silver casket and the count puts more cushions behind him.

The cafe manager goes to the mansion during his lunch break. He recognises the tramp and starts shaking him by the neck again then throws him out of a window. A policeman comes by and the tramp runs off. The girl wonders where the tramp has gone. When she explains to the manager he thinks they might be sued and he runs after the tramp to call him back, meeting the toff outside. The two pursue the tramp, getting faster and faster until all three are running at full speed. The policeman joins the chase but the tramp manages to dodge each grab.

A second policeman is trying to call from a police call box as he holds onto two thieves. They run off towards the tramp. The policeman fires his pistol and hits the tramp in the backside while the tramp holds a sign: "All Goods Delivered in the Rear". The tram hides in a barrel. The thieves run to the mansion and enter the window which the tramp was thrown out of with the tramp following soon after and two police soon after that. A lot of running from room to room ensues, and a lot of kicking. The manager and toff reappear and the tramp hits each on the head with a vase... they stagger out and get hit on the head by the police in turn. The police draw their pistols and the tramp and thieves put their hands up to surrender. The police thank the tramp and hand-cuff the thieves.

The thieves are taken off and everyone remaining shakes hands. The tramp is invited to stay for tea. The tramp talks to the toff while the manager explains to the girl the earlier events. Their sister comes downstairs and joins them in the hall. Other female guests arrive. The tramp likes the sister and flirts with her. The other guests follow the toff. More female guests arrive and are greeted by the manager.

The count brings in a case containing a violin and gives it to the toff who says it is worth up to $20,000. He starts to play. The tramp sits to the side with the sister and mocks his playing. He wears a lampshade like a hula skirt and holds the violin like a ukulele. The violin starts to get tugged around by the tramp and the toff and gets smashed on the toff's head.

The count comes in with a tea trolley and serves the tramp and the sister, then the other guests. A mouse comes through a hole and goes to the tramp's feet then climbs into his waistcoat. He shakes his leg and it comes out the bottom of his trousers. The sister is shocked. He catches it under his hat and shows it to the guests.

== Cast ==
- Billy West as Billy
- Oliver Hardy as Cafe Owner (as Babe Hardy)
- Ethel Marie Burton as The Girl
- Leo White as The Count
- Rosemary Theby as The Sister
- Joe Bordeaux as the Toff
- Bud Ross as the Chauffeur
- Don Likes as the cafe customer

== Home video ==
The film was released on DVD in 2016 as part of the "Early Silent Classics of Stan Laurel and Oliver Hardy, Volume 5".

== See also ==
- List of American films of 1918
- Oliver Hardy filmography; the film is not to be confused with The Rogue Song, a 1930 film with Laurel and Hardy
