= The Chief Cook =

1917 film

- The film
- Directed by: Arvid E. Gillstrom
- Written by: Rex Taylor
- Produced by: Louis Burstein
- Starring: Billy West; Oliver Hardy
- Cinematography: Photographed by: Herman Obrock
- Release date: October 1, 1917
- Country: United States
- Languages: Silent film English intertitles

The Chief Cook is a 1917 American two-reel silent comedy film from the King-Bee Films featuring Oliver Hardy. The film was shot in Bayonne, New Jersey, where King-Bee was then located. Chaplin biographer Uno Asplund analyzes it as a "vaguely Chaplin" film that was sometimes even advertised with an image of Chaplin (see movie advertisement). It was on a double bill with The Fly Cop.

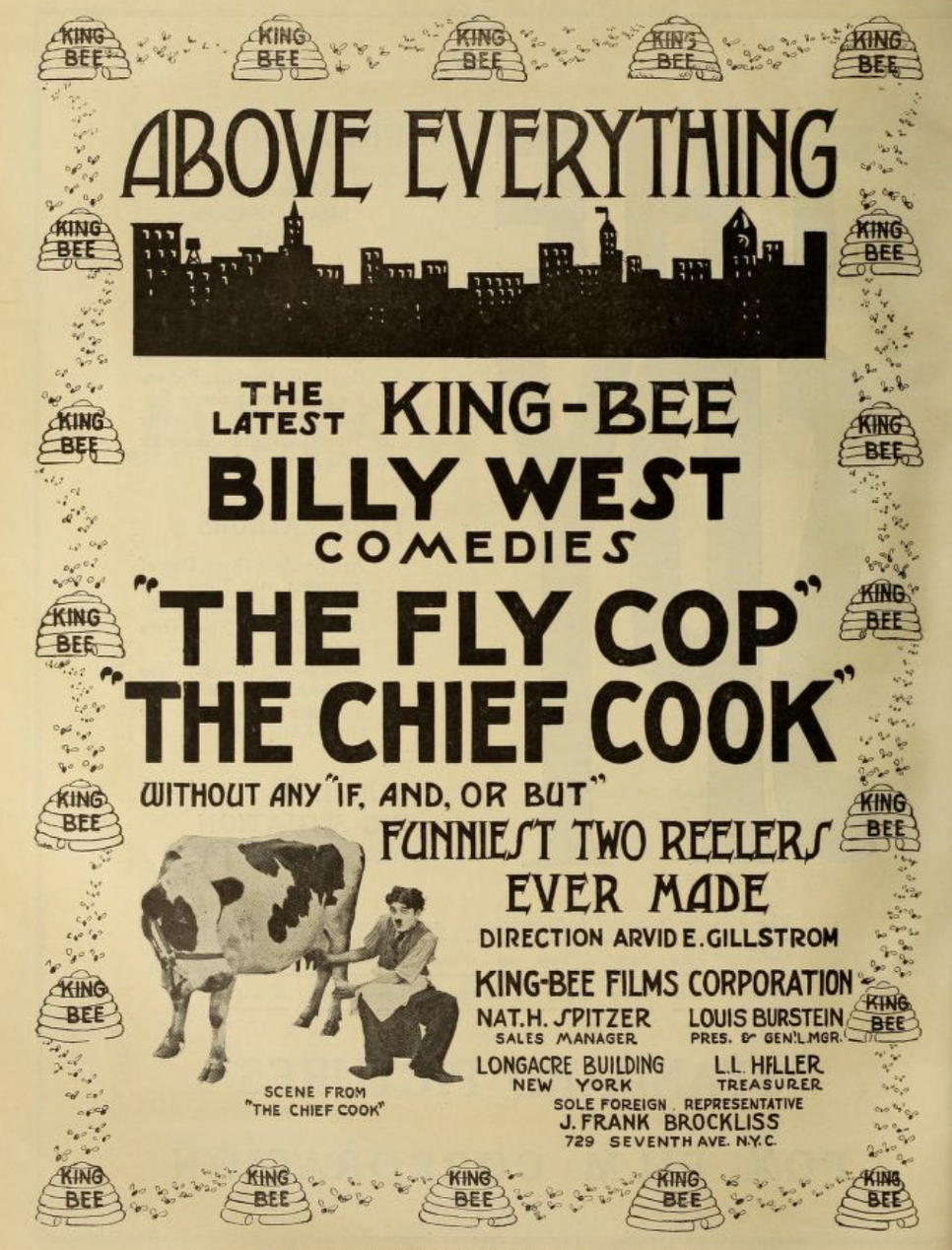

== Plot ==
This synopsis was published in Motion Picture News:

"The Chief Cook," released Oct. 1, tells the story of the visit of a traveling theatrical company to a country hotel where the help have just struck. The star and only boarder, West, who is caught in his efforts to flee the hotel, is pressed into service as porter, bellboy, waiter and finally as cook. His love affairs with the leading woman of the company (Ellen Burford) and his pursuit by her husband (Babe Hardy) brought a bunch of laughs from the reviewers — something that is very rare. Blanche White as the slavey revealed herself as a comedienne who will bear watching as a future star. Her interpretations are strongly remindful of the work of Polly Moran.

— Rex Taylor

== Cast ==
- Billy West as The Star Boarder
- Bud Ross as Boggs (as Budd Ross)
- Oliver Hardy as Babe (as Babe Hardy)
- Ellen Burford as Dolly
- Joe Cohen
- Leo White as Ham

== See also ==
- List of American films of 1917
- Oliver Hardy filmography
