= The Hobo =

1917 film

- Full movie
- Directed by: Arvid E. Gillstrom
- Produced by: Louis Burstein
- Starring: Billy West; Oliver Hardy
- Release date: November 1, 1917
- Running time: 15 minutes
- Country: United States
- Languages: Silent film English intertitles

The Hobo is a 1917 American 2-reel silent comedy film featuring Billy West and Oliver Hardy.

== Plot ==
Harold sits in a diner eating a huge stack of pancakes.

Outside a hobo hides on a platform under a railway freight car. He sits by the track and has a picnic as an astonished brakeman looks on.

The hobo spies some pies and vaults a fence. A dog chases him and he bumps into Dolly. She drops her handkerchief and he follows her to the ticket office of the station to return it. She goes into the office and surprises her father.

The hobo knocks on the hatch and the girl appears. He hooks her neck with his walking stick and pulls her head through the hole.

Back in the diner Harold has finished the pancakes and starts work on eating a whole sponge cake. He spots the hobo trying to kiss Dolly, who is his girlfriend. He throws the cake but misses the hobo. It goes through the hatch and hits Mr Fox in the face. Everyone ends up fighting in the office.

Mr Fox leaves with his daughter and leaves the hobo in charge. Harold sticks his head through the hatch and the hobo closes it, trapping his head. He then starts to paint his face.

Harold returns to the diner and starts fighting with the cook. The cook goes to the hatch. The cook takes over in the ticket office and the hobo puts on an apron and goes to the diner. A train comes in and a dozen men and women arrive together each looking to eat quickly. The hobo starts making pancakes. He accidentally puts hot pepper on the pancakes, but gives them to Harold who swallows them in one bite before his throat starts to burn. A food fight begins but the train whistle goes and all except Harold and the hobo leave.

The hobo goes back to the ticket office. A black-face couple arrive: a small man (Bud Ross) and his huge wife. The wife takes three negro children out of a "handle with care" trunk. More and more children then appear, ten in all. Finally a huge black-face boy comes out. The smaller children dance in a circle around the mother and big boy.

The hobo tries to work out the price of the tickets. He gives the mother a watermelon and the family sit outside and eat it.

we jump to the police headquarters where a car has been reported stolen with a $50 reward. A well-dressed man goes into the station with his wife and offers the hobo his auto in exchange for two train tickets. He gives them a string of tickets and they go to the waiting area. But he misses the last train.

Meanwhile Harold has a new roadster. The hobo goes to inspect his own new car but thinks it is the roadster and gets in. He picks up Dolly. Harold reports his car stolen. The hobo returns to the ticket office where the well dressed man is trying to get into the safe. The man hides. The hobo gets into the safe and takes out fuel for the stove, then shuts the safe and leaves. He drives off with Dolly.

At police HQ we are told that the first stolen car belonged to the police chief. He flags down a charabanc and they pick up Harold and give chase.

The hobo and Dolly go to a restaurant. The police spot the stolen roadster outside the restaurant and go in. The well-dressed man spots the roadster and tries to steal it. Everyone comes out of the restaurant and he is arrested. The police chief gives the hobo a large pile of money (even though it is Harold's car retrieved). Harold has to drive Dolly and the hobo home. Dolly apologizes to Harold. The hobo puts all the new-found cash in her hand. He leaves them and gets on the train to his next destination.

== Cast ==
- Billy West as The Hobo
- Oliver Hardy as Harold (as Babe Hardy)
- Leo White as Mr. Fox
- Bud Ross as himself
- Virginia Clark as Dolly Fox
- Harry Naughton as the brakeman
- Tom Wood as the black-face wife

== Reception ==
Like many American films of the time, The Hobo was subject to cuts by city and state film censorship boards. The Chicago Board of Censors required a cut where the man blew his nose in a cuspidor.

== See also ==
- List of American films of 1917
- Oliver Hardy filmography
