= He's in Again =

1918 film

- The film
- Directed by: Charles Parrott
- Written by: Vincent Bryan
- Produced by: Milton Cohen
- Starring: Billy West
- Release date: December 15, 1918
- Running time: 24 minutes (2 reels)
- Country: United States
- Languages: Silent film English intertitles

He's in Again is a 1918 American 2-reel silent comedy film starring Billy West and featuring Oliver Hardy (as Babe Hardy). It is one of the many films where West imitates Charlie Chaplin. The director was Charles Parrott, later known as Charley Chase.

== Plot ==
A restaurant is offering a special floor show: "Girls Direct from Paris (Texas)" and a boxing exhibition. A Chaplinesque tramp (Billy West) tries to crash the door, and eventually gets past the bouncer.

The waiter (Oliver Hardy) gives Billy a seat at a small table and offers him the menu. Billy rips up the menu and asks for a large beer. The waiter brings it but wants his five cents. The penniless Billy keeps trying to sneak a sip of beer while the waiter is distracted, but the waiter always catches on and ejects Billy.

Back inside, the boss tells the waiter to bring the tramp back in to work off the five cents. Billy goes to work at the bar, where a patron tries to con him out of a drink. Vera Jello (Blanche Payson), a floor-show dancer with active muscles, unwittingly mixes a milk shake for the new bartender.

When the dancer refuses to go on, the manager orders Billy to take her place. In costume and veil he masquerades as Beda Thara (a play on silent-screen vamp Theda Bara), dancing with a fake snake. The drunk asks the manager to invite "her" to his table. Billy doesn't want any part of it, but the manager insists.

Next Billy waits on a young couple. The fresh guy (Leo White) is trying to get the woman (Ethelyn Gibson) to drink strong spirits. Billy interferes by switching her drink to root beer, pleasing the woman but enraging the fresh guy.

The next attraction in the floor show is a boxing match, but prizefighter Kid Bogan hasn't shown up. The manager offers Billy $5 to fight in his place, under the name Battling Gink. His opponent is none other than Leo, the fresh guy. Billy fumbles in the ring but manages to knock out Leo.

Billy wins the prize money. Leo tries to force his attentions on the woman, but Billy grabs him and knocks him out again. Billy quietly suggests that the woman should leave the club, and she meekly departs.

== Cast ==
- Billy West as a Customer
- Babe Hardy as the Head Waiter
- Leo White as the Fresh Guy
- Ethelyn Gibson as the Girl
- Blanche Payson as Vera Jello, the Dancer
- Charles Parrott as Syncopated Sam Snuffer, the Piano Player
- Budd Ross as a Drunk
- Stanton Heck

== Production ==
He's in Again was produced by Louis Burstein's King Bee company, and was one of a series of popular Billy West comedies. By late 1918 King Bee was in financial trouble and was bought out by Milton Cohen's Bulls Eye [sic] company. Cohen acquired He's in Again from King Bee and made it Bulls Eye's first Billy West release.

== See also ==
- List of American films of 1918
- Oliver Hardy filmography
