= Wanted – A Bad Man =

1917 film

Wanted - A Bad Man
- Directed by: Oliver Hardy
- Produced by: Louis Burstein
- Starring: Oliver Hardy
- Release date: March 24, 1917
- Running time: 11 minutes
- Country: United States
- Languages: Silent film English intertitles

Wanted – A Bad Man is a 1917 American comedy film featuring Oliver Hardy. The film was produced by the Vim Comedy Company.

== Cast ==
- Ethel Marie Burton (as Ethel Burton)
- Oliver Hardy (as Babe Hardy)
- Bud Ross (as Budd Ross)

== See also ==
- List of American films of 1917
