= Beauties in Distress =

1918 film

- Directed by: Charley Chase
- Written by: Billy West
- Produced by: Louis Burstein
- Starring: Billy West; Oliver Hardy
- Release date: July 15, 1918
- Country: United States
- Languages: Silent film English intertitles

Beauties in Distress, often listed as Beauty in Distress, is a 1918 American comedy film featuring Oliver Hardy.

== Plot ==
Although the film was announced inThe Moving Picture World for a July, 1918 release, no synopsis has yet been located in the magazine, which generally published all of them.

== Cast ==
- Billy West
- Oliver Hardy (as Babe Hardy)

== See also ==
- List of American films of 1918
- Oliver Hardy filmography
