= Just an Echo =

- Directed by: Arvid E. Gillstrom
- Produced by: Arvid E. Gillstrom
- Starring: Bing Crosby; Vernon Dent; Mary Kornman
- Distributed by: Paramount Pictures
- Release date: January 19, 1934
- Running time: 22 minutes
- Country: United States
- Language: English

Just an Echo is a 1934 Paramount short starring Bing Crosby and directed by Arvid E. Gillstrom. This was the second of two short films Crosby made for Paramount in May / June 1933, the other being Please.

== Background ==
Crosby had been working in radio from January to March 1933 in New York where he was using the song “Just an Echo in the Valley” as the closing theme for his show. He returned to Hollywood in April 1933, to film College Humor. After completing that assignment, he commenced filming two short films for Paramount on May 24, 1933 with exteriors being done at Yosemite National Park. Both of the songs he featured in Just an Echo had been sizeable hits for him in 1933 with “Just an Echo in the Valley” reaching the No. 2 position in the charts of the day.

== Cast ==
- Bing Crosby
- Mary Kornman
- Vernon Dent
- Carl Harbaugh
- Alyce Ardell

== Plot ==
Crosby is cast as a ranger in Yosemite Valley. When he sees a girl, played by Mary Kornman, smoking in her car in a forbidden area he takes the cigarette from her. However when she starts the car suddenly, it scares his horse which gallops off without its rider.

Arriving at camp dusty and weary after a long walk, he again finds the girl smoking and angrily takes the cigarette away from her. His Captain arrives to see the cigarette in Crosby's hand and admonishes him and Crosby takes the blame. The girl has him assigned to do things for her, such as unpacking her baggage, shining her boots, etc., while Vernon Dent is attracted to her girlfriend.

Mary Kornman's character proves to be the Captain's niece and though Crosby falls for her, he does not show his feelings. In order to get his attention, the girl jumps into the lake and Crosby duly rescues her. There is a happy ending with the two of them on horseback, and Crosby reprising ‘Just an Echo.’

== Reception ==
Variety commented: “In between the light romantic plot developments, Crosby croons a couple of numbers, with ‘Just an Echo’ the tune featured. Lacks the punch of a trip hammer but agreeable shorts diversion for all.”

== Soundtrack ==
- "Just an Echo in the Valley” (Harry M. Woods / Jimmy Campbell and Reg Connelly)
- "You’re Beautiful Tonight, My Dear” (Carmen Lombardo / Joe Young)
