= Don't Be Foolish =

1922 film by Billy West

Don't Be Foolish is a silent two-reel comedy film directed by and starring Billy West. West was long established as the premier Charlie Chaplin impersonator, but he abandoned the Chaplin act in 1920 in favor of a slick, straw-hatted, man-about-town character.

Almost all of the surviving Billy West comedies are his Chaplin burlesques, so film collectors were surprised when Blackhawk Films reprinted home-movie versions of Don't Be Foolish in the 1970s, revealing West as an entirely new personality.

== Plot ==
"Twas Springtime, and the trees were full of sap." Enter Billy, the local dandy. "And the sap was full of bananas." Billy has a sackful of bananas. Three policemen are on duty in the park. Billy throws his banana peel on the ground. and the senior officer glares at him. Billy keeps throwing banana peels, resulting in a chase through the park.

Meanwhile, a pretty girl is feeding the ducks from a bench. A matron, Lydia Pinkham, has "a face that will never see a magazine cover." She sits on the other end of the bench to read a magazine. They chat and it is made clear that they live in the same apartment building.

Billy tries to duck the police, but ends up in custody. The cop calls for the paddy wagon on a street phone, but Billy stops at the Sip and Bite Café. The cop won't let Billy go in, in case he tries to escape -- so the cop goes in himself to get Billy a sandwich. Billy then uses the phone to cancel the paddy wagon. Another policeman saw him using the police phone. Billy walks away briskly, with the new policeman matching his stride. The tempo increases until they are running. Billy escapes and uses a phone to call Miss Lydia, whom he thinks is the younger girl from the park. He arranges to drop in on the lady, and showers her with endearments -- until he sees her face. He asks her to play hide and seek and blindfolds her. Then he climbs into the dumb waiter and it descends to the apartment of the girl he thought he was visiting.

Billy spots a policeman's cap in the girl's apartment and decides to leave - just as the policeman returns. Another chase begins, and Billy disguises in a painter's white overalls. He hides in a blanket striped with black paint, which transforms his overalls into a typical prison uniform. He runs into a tall gate and closes it, only to find himself at the penitentiary.

== Cast ==
- Billy West as the dandy
- Tom Murray as Policeman
- Frank Hayes as Lydia Pinkham

== Production ==
Billy West signed with up-and-coming producer Harry Cohn of C. B. C. Film Exchange -- later Columbia Pictures -- for a series of "Sunbeam Comedies" (later "Sunrise Comedies"). Don't Be Foolish was the first one produced. Cohn had announced 26 West comedies, but only four were completed before financial problems forced Cohn to discontinue the series.
