= The Orderly =

1918 film

- Directed by: Arvid E. Gillstrom
- Produced by: Louis Burstein
- Starring: Billy West; Oliver Hardy
- Release date: March 1, 1918
- Country: United States
- Languages: Silent film English intertitles

The Orderly is a 1918 American silent comedy film featuring Oliver Hardy.

== Cast ==
- Billy West as Sanitarium orderly
- Oliver Hardy (as Babe Hardy)
- Leatrice Joy
- Ethel Marie Burton
- Leo White
- Joe Bordeaux
- Bud Ross

== See also ==
- Oliver Hardy filmography
