= Winnie Winkle =

American newspaper comic strip

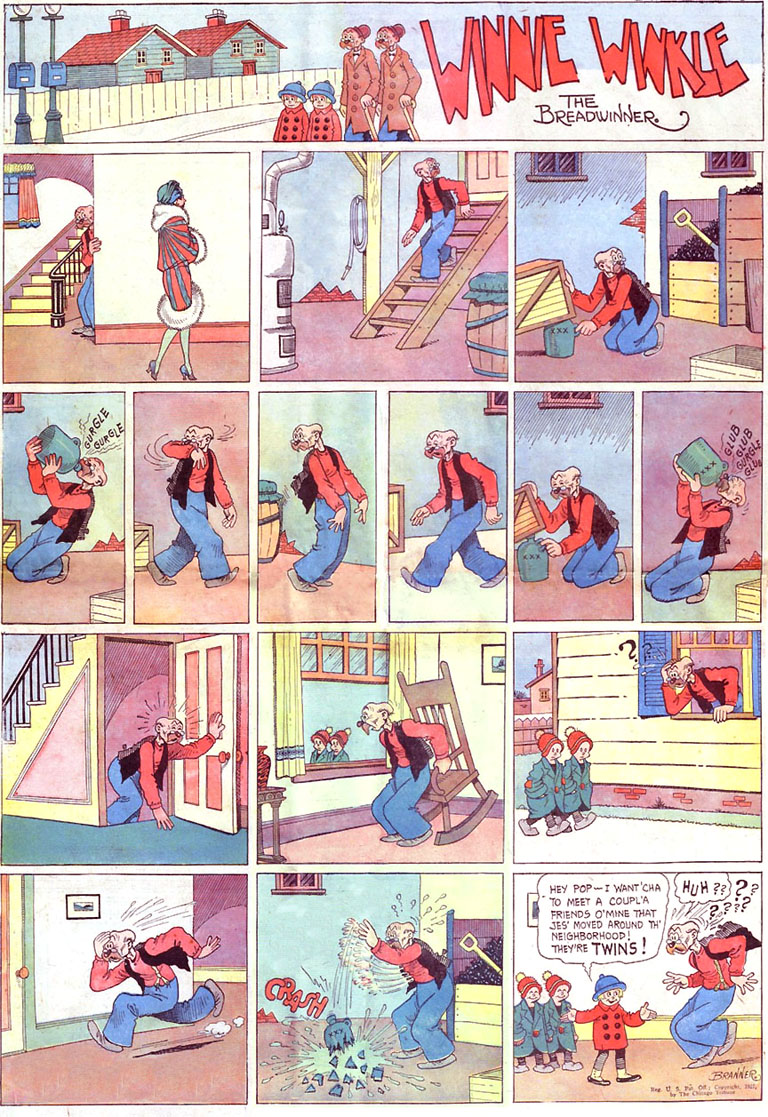
- Winnie Winkle Sunday page of March 6, 1927
- Author(s): Martin Branner (1920–1962); Max Van Bibber (1962–1980); Frank Bolle (1980–1996)
- Current status/schedule: Concluded
- Launch date: September 20, 1920
- End date: July 28, 1996
- Syndicate: Chicago Tribune Syndicate
- Genre: humor

Winnie Winkle is an American comic strip published during a 76-year span (1920–1996). Ten film adaptations were also made. Its premise was conceived by Joseph Medill Patterson, but the stories and artwork were by Martin Branner, who wrote the strip for over 40 years. It was one of the first comic strips about working women. The main character was a young woman who had to support her parents and adopted brother, serving as a reflection of the changing role of women in society. It ran in more than 100 newspapers and translations of the strip's Sunday pages were made available in Europe, focusing on her little brother Perry Winkle and his gang.

Due to its originality and longevity, Winnie Winkle became a household name and inspired Roy Lichtenstein. It was reprinted in Dell Comics, and some see it as heralding a more independent role for American women after World War I.

== Publication history ==
The Chicago Tribune Syndicate launched the comic strip on September 20, 1920. By 1939, Winnie Winkle was running in more than 140 newspapers. It was titled Winnie Winkle the Breadwinner until 1943. By 1970, Winnie Winkle still ran in more than 150 newspapers.

Winnie Winkle had a topper strip on the Sunday page, originally called Looie Blooie when it debuted on January 11, 1931, and shortened to Looie on May 6, 1934. This was based on Branner's short-lived 1919 daily strip, Looie the Lawyer. As a topper, Looie ran for three decades, until 1962. From 1935 to 1936, there was also a paper-doll panel in the topper with several different titles: Winnie Winkle Fashion Cut-Outs, Winnie Winkle Style Story and Winnie Winkle Fashion Film Cut-Out.

Winnie Winkle ended July 28, 1996, after 76 years, one of the longest runs in American comic strip history. Tribune Media Services, the syndicate that distributed the comic strip, "felt that the Winnie Winkle character was not recognized as a contemporary role model for the '90s." At the time, the strip was carried by only a handful of newspapers.

== Characters and story ==
The eponymous character Winnie Winkle was a young, unmarried woman who had to support her parents, making it the second popular comic strip about working women (after Somebody's Stenog, which debuted in 1918). It was a reflection of the new role of women in society, as could also be seen in comics such as Tillie the Toiler from 1921. Writing for the Associated Press in 1993, Hugh A. Mulligan noted, "After women got the vote and joined the work force, family-centered comics were joined by working-girl strips like Winnie Winkle, Tillie the Toiler, Dixie Dugan, Somebody's Stenog and Brenda Starr, which was drawn by a woman, Dale Messick. Almost from the beginning, politics and a social conscience hovered over the drawing board."

During its first years, the daily Winnie Winkle evolved from simple gags to more complex humorous situations. A new character was introduced in the form of Perry, a little boy from the backstreets, whom the Winkles adopted in 1922. The focus of the Sunday pages then shifted to the adventures of Perry at home, school and on the streets. Although compelled to wear a duffle coat and fancy clothes, he continued to frequent his old neighborhood. The local gang, the Rinkydinks, in contrast, still wore torn and patchy clothing, and were regarded by Winnie as "loafers." One member of the Rinkydinks was the dunce Denny Dimwit, who popularized the catch phrase "Youse is a good boy, Denny."

Winnie Winkle's Denny Dimwit has not been forgotten. In recent years, the character has been referenced several times in Bill Griffith's Zippy the Pinhead comic strip.

Other major plot elements were the 1937 marriage of Winnie to engineer Will Wright and the disappearance of Will during World War II, leaving a pregnant Winnie behind. This realistic and unfortunate situation was too risqué for some newspapers: The Baltimore Sun dropped the strip early in 1941 because of the pregnancy of Winnie. The comic strip changed significantly over the years; with Winnie working in the fashion industry after the war, seemingly as a widow until her husband returned after a few decades. She took on various other jobs and endeavors over the years, including a stint in the Peace Corps.

== Artists ==
Branner employed a number of assistants, including Royal King Cole (during the 1930s), Rolf Ahlson, Mike Peppe, and Max Van Bibber (1938–1962). Another assistant was the young French author Robert Velter, who on his return to Europe created the famous series Spirou et Fantasio.

From 1941 until 1958, Branner's assistant was John A. Berrill, who later created Gil Thorp. After Branner suffered a stroke in 1962, Van Bibber continued the series until 1980, later followed by students from the Joe Kubert School of Cartoon and Graphic Art and finally by veteran artist Frank Bolle. Bolle (who enlisted Leonard Starr to write the strip in 1985) recalled:

I did Winnie Winkle for 20 years, and when they told me, "You have 90 days to wrap it up," because they were discontinuing it, I felt terrible, but after I finished it, I didn't even miss it. I was depressed because I lost a good job, but I just didn't miss it. Maybe it was the routine of it every week I didn't miss, but I have a lot of good memories of doing that strip.

== International spin-offs and translations ==
In 1923, Winnie's adopted younger brother Perry Winkle and his friends the Rinkydinks became the focus of the Sunday pages. In Europe, only the Sunday pages were translated. In The Netherlands and France, local artists made new comics about Perry when the number of weekly pages by Branner was no longer sufficient.

- The Dutch translated the strip as Sjors van de Rebellenclub which became very popular in the Netherlands, where it was the predecessor of the long-running series Sjors en Sjimmie by Frans Piët.
- In France, it was known as Bicot and published by Hachette in 14 albums between 1926 and 1939.
- In Flanders, Belgium the series De Vrolijke Bengels by Willy Vandersteen and De Lustige Kapoentjes by Marc Sleen were directly inspired by this strip.
- The Sunday page of Winnie Winkle was the first American comic published in a Yugoslavian daily newspaper, Jutarnji list from Zagreb. It first appeared on August 5, 1923, and lasted until April 1941, the beginning of World War II in that country. Perry, the hero, was renamed "Ivica" (Johnny), and Winnie "Suzana". The Rinkydinks were rechristened "Rantanplanci", allegedly after a group of kids from a contemporary Hollywood film series. The title was Pustolovni Ivica ("Adventurous Johnny"). A single Christmas episode taking place in Zagreb was published, the work of unknown local authors. Three albums collected the stories published in the newspaper.

== Films ==
From 1926 to 1928, eleven Winnie Winkle, the Breadwinner, and the Rinky Dinks movies were produced by Weiss Brothers Artclass Pictures, written by Branner and starring Ethelyn Gibson as Winnie, with Billy West as director.

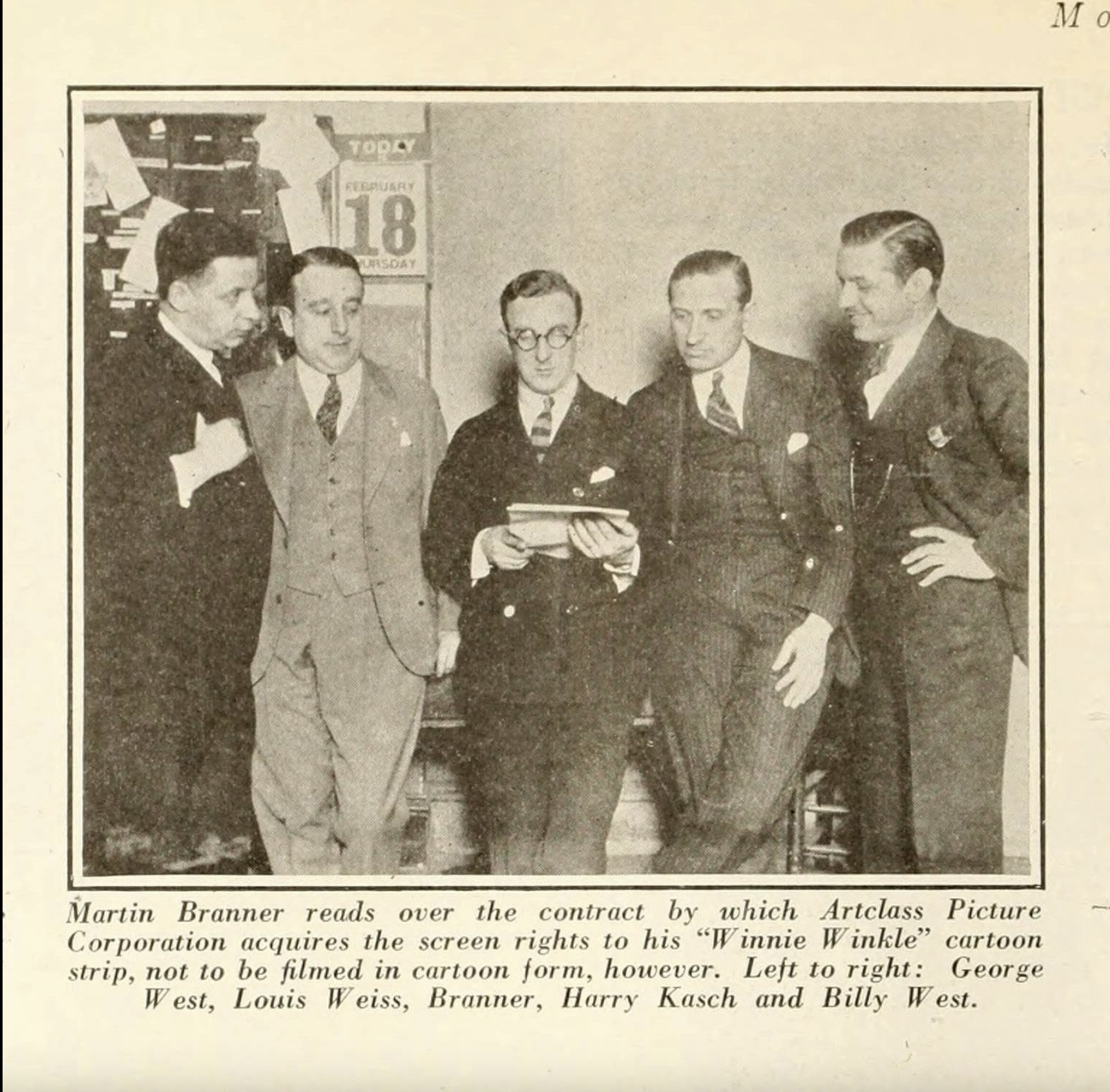

1. Happy Days (1926)
2. Working Winnie (1926)
3. Winnie's Birthday (1926)
4. Oh! Winnie Behave (1926)
5. Winnie's Vacation (1927)
6. Winnie Wakes Up (1927)
7. Winnie Steps Out (1927)
8. Winnie Be Good (1927)
9. Winning Winnie (1927)
10. Winnie's Winning Ways (1928)
11. Weary Winnie (1928) (Ethelyn, as Winnie, doesn't appear in this one, Bobby Nelson plays her brother Perry Winkle. The West Brothers produced this one for Weiss Brothers Artclass Pictures)

== Awards ==
In 1958, Branner received the National Cartoonists Society's Humor Comic Strip Division Award for Winnie Winkle.

== Archives ==
Martin Branner's Winnie Winkle (April 25, 1943)

Syracuse University houses the Martin Branner Cartoons collection of 300 original daily cartoons from Winnie Winkle (1920–1957). There is a complete week from each year represented, with additional random cartoons from each year. (There are no holdings for 1946–47.) The daily cartoons display traces of graphite, blue pencil, Zip-A-Tone, brush, pen and ink on illustration board measuring approximately 7 ¼ × 22 ½ inches. The Smithsonian's National Museum of American History has 28 volumes of Branner's proofs for the strip.
