= The Handy Man (1918 film) =

1918 film

- Directed by: Charley Chase
- Produced by: Louis Burstein
- Starring: Billy West; Oliver Hardy
- Distributed by: King Bee Studios
- Release date: May 1, 1918
- Country: United States
- Language: Silent (English intertitles)

The Handy Man is a 1918 American 2-reel silent comedy film featuring Oliver Hardy.

== Cast ==
- Billy West
- Leatrice Joy
- Oliver Hardy (credited as Babe Hardy)
- Ethel Marie Burton
- Leo White
- Joe Bordeaux

== Reception ==
Like many American films of the time, The Handy Man was subject to restrictions and cuts by city and state film censorship boards. For example, the Chicago Board of Censors cut, in Reel 2, girl in swing embracing man with legs, girl on man's back and subsequent scene showing wet floor, and woman coming out of roof dishabille.

== See also ==
- List of American films of 1918
