= Bright and Early =

1918 film

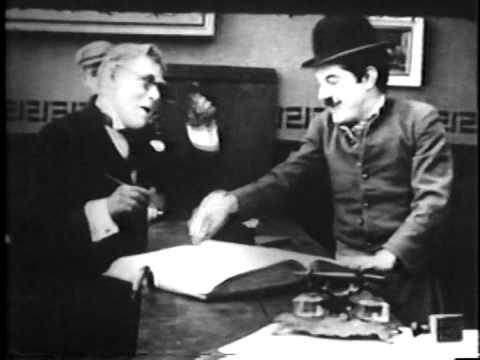
- Film scene
- Directed by: Charley Chase
- Produced by: Louis Burstein
- Starring: Billy West; Oliver Hardy
- Cinematography: Herman Obrock Jr.
- Production company: King Bee Studios
- Release date: May 15, 1918
- Country: United States
- Language: Silent (English intertitles)

Bright and Early is a 1918 American 2-reel short comedy film featuring Oliver Hardy. This short is preserved in the Library of Congress's collection.

== Cast ==
- Billy West as A Bellboy
- Oliver Hardy as The Boss (credited as Babe Hardy)
- Rosemary Theby as His daughter
- Leo White as An honest crook
- Bud Ross as Old man
- Fay Holderness as A Maid
- Ethelyn Gibson (credited as Ethlyn Gibson)

== Reception ==
Like many American films of the time, Bright and Early was subject to restrictions and cuts by city and state film censorship boards. For example, the Chicago Board of Censors cut, in Reel 1, the entire scene of man taking small boy to bathroom and the child's actions outside the room, Reel 2, scene of man in women's underwear where man is peeking through keyhole, man and woman on floor where woman throws her legs up, and the woman on floor showing underwear dropping from her shoulders. Some of these scenes were also removed by the Kansas Board of Review, including a scene of Billy West rubbing a woman's foot.

== See also ==
- List of American films of 1918
- Oliver Hardy filmography
