= The Scholar (film) =

1918 film

- Directed by: Arvid E. Gillstrom
- Produced by: Louis Burstein
- Starring: Billy West; Oliver Hardy
- Cinematography: Herman Obrock Jr.
- Distributed by: King Bee Studios
- Release date: March 15, 1918
- Running time: 20 minutes
- Country: United States
- Languages: Silent film English intertitles

The Scholar is a 1918 American 2-reel silent comedy film featuring Oliver Hardy.

== Plot ==
When a beautiful new schoolteacher arrives in town, two rivals view for her attention: Oliver "Babe" Hardy and the little tramp in the form of a Charlie Chaplin impersonator.

== Cast ==
- Billy West as A Student
- Oliver Hardy (credited as Babe Hardy)
- Ethel Marie Burton as The Teacher (credited as Ethel Burton)
- Leatrice Joy
- Leo White
- Joe Bordeaux

== Reception ==
Like many American films of the time, The Scholar was subject to cuts by city and state film censorship boards. For example, the Chicago Board of Censors required cuts, in Reel 1, of the man pulling pincushion from his posterior, silhouette of girl undressing, Reel 2, schoolroom scene were boy kicks girl, man pulling tack from posterior, West striking boy with slingshot in posterior as he bends over, the intertitle "Teacher, can I go out?" and West's vulgar actions of smelling after the intertitle "Teacher, please let him out", school superintendent thumbing nose, scene of man's underwear showing through his torn trousers, two scenes of jabbing man with pin cushion to include West pulling man's coat apart exposing trousers, fat man pointing after child speaks to him, and fat man falling exposing underwear.

== See also ==
- List of American films of 1918
