= His Day Out =

1918 film

- Directed by: Arvid E. Gillstrom
- Written by: Bud Ross; Billy West
- Produced by: Louis Burstein
- Starring: Billy West; Oliver Hardy
- Release date: January 15, 1918
- Running time: 20 minutes
- Country: United States
- Languages: Silent film English intertitles

His Day Out is a surviving 1918 American silent comedy short film featuring Oliver Hardy.

== Cast ==
- Billy West as Billy
- Leatrice Joy as Joy
- Oliver Hardy as Oliver
- Leo White
- Joe Bordeaux
- Ethel Marie Burton
- Bud Ross as The Father (as Budd Ross)
- Slim Cole
- Don Likes as A Customer
- Billy Quirk

== Release ==
His Day Out was released on January 15, 1918, in the United States.

== See also ==
- List of American films of 1918
- Oliver Hardy filmography
