= Double Trouble (1941 film) =

1941 film

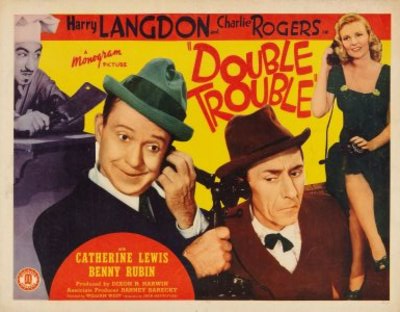
- Poster for the film
- Directed by: Billy West (as William West)
- Written by: Jack Natteford
- Produced by: Dixon R. Harwin
- Starring: Harry Langdon; Charles Rogers; Catherine Lewis
- Cinematography: Arthur Martinelli
- Edited by: Carl Pierson
- Music by: Ross DiMaggio
- Production company: Monogram Pictures
- Distributed by: Monogram Pictures
- Release date: November 21, 1941 (US)
- Running time: 63 minutes
- Country: United States
- Language: English

Double Trouble is a 1941 American comedy film directed by the former Chaplin impersonator Billy West under the pseudonym "William West". The film stars Harry Langdon, Charles Rogers, and Catherine Lewis. It was released on November 21, 1941. During production the working title of the film was Here We Go Again.

== Plot ==
The owner of a baked-beans cannery receives word that two young refugees are being sent from war-torn England to live with his family "for the duration." The "youngsters" turn out to be Bert and Alf, two dimwitted adults. The company's advertising manager, Sparky, rents a $100,000 diamond bracelet as a promotional gimmick, but competitor Kimble makes off with the bracelet and ditches it. Bert and Alf, now working at the cannery, find the bracelet and promptly misplace it. The bracelet becomes sealed in a can of baked beans on the production line. Sparky writes up the story for publicity value, and the company is immediately deluged with orders. Customers scramble to find the lucky can containing the jewelry, and Bert and Alf are charged with finding the missing bracelet. They trace it to a restaurant, and disguise as waitresses to reclaim the prize.

== Cast ==
- Harry Langdon as Bert Prattle
- Charles Rogers as Alf Prattle
- Catherine Lewis as Peggy Whitmore
- Louise Currie as Miss Mink
- Dave O'Brien as Sparky Marshall
- Frank Jaquet as John Whitmore
- Mira McKinney as Mrs. Whitmore
- Wheeler Oakman as Kimble, competitor
- Benny Rubin as Pete
- Eddie Kane as Carney
- Richard Cramer as Detective Hogan (as Dick Cramer)
- Ruth Hiatt as Production-line Worker

== Production ==
Silent-screen comedian Billy West had joined the Monogram staff in 1940 as an occasional director. The studio reminded movie columnists of West's credentials: "William West, director of Monogram's The Last Alarm, is a former screen comedian, having appeared in more than 200 comedies." West was then working full-time at Columbia Pictures, where he and his wife operated the Columbia Grill, a quick-service restaurant. He accepted three assignments from Monogram, each filmed within two weeks' time, and Monogram's fast shooting schedules did not seriously interfere with West's full-time job at Columbia.

Both Harry Langdon and Charley Rogers had been gag writers for Laurel and Hardy. Rogers remembered the team's film Our Relations (1936), where the "Stan and Ollie" characters had twin brothers named "Alf and Bert". Rogers reused these character names for his new partnership with Langdon.

== Reception ==
Reviews were very good, hailing the film as a lightweight but solid comedy. Showmen's Trade Review reported, "The return of Harry Langdon to the screen is itself news, but the fact that he appears in an entertaining comedy makes it that much more interesting. Old-timers who remember Langdon are in for a treat. A piece of swell casting is Charles Rogers as Langdon's sidekick. Between them they romp through their assignments in a manner that will amuse any type of audience." Vance King of Motion Picture Herald added, "The film drew a number of laughs at its preview, held on a Friday night at a neighborhood house before an audience of young and old. William West directed the film, which is heavy on the slapstick."
