= The Hero (1917 film) =

1917 film

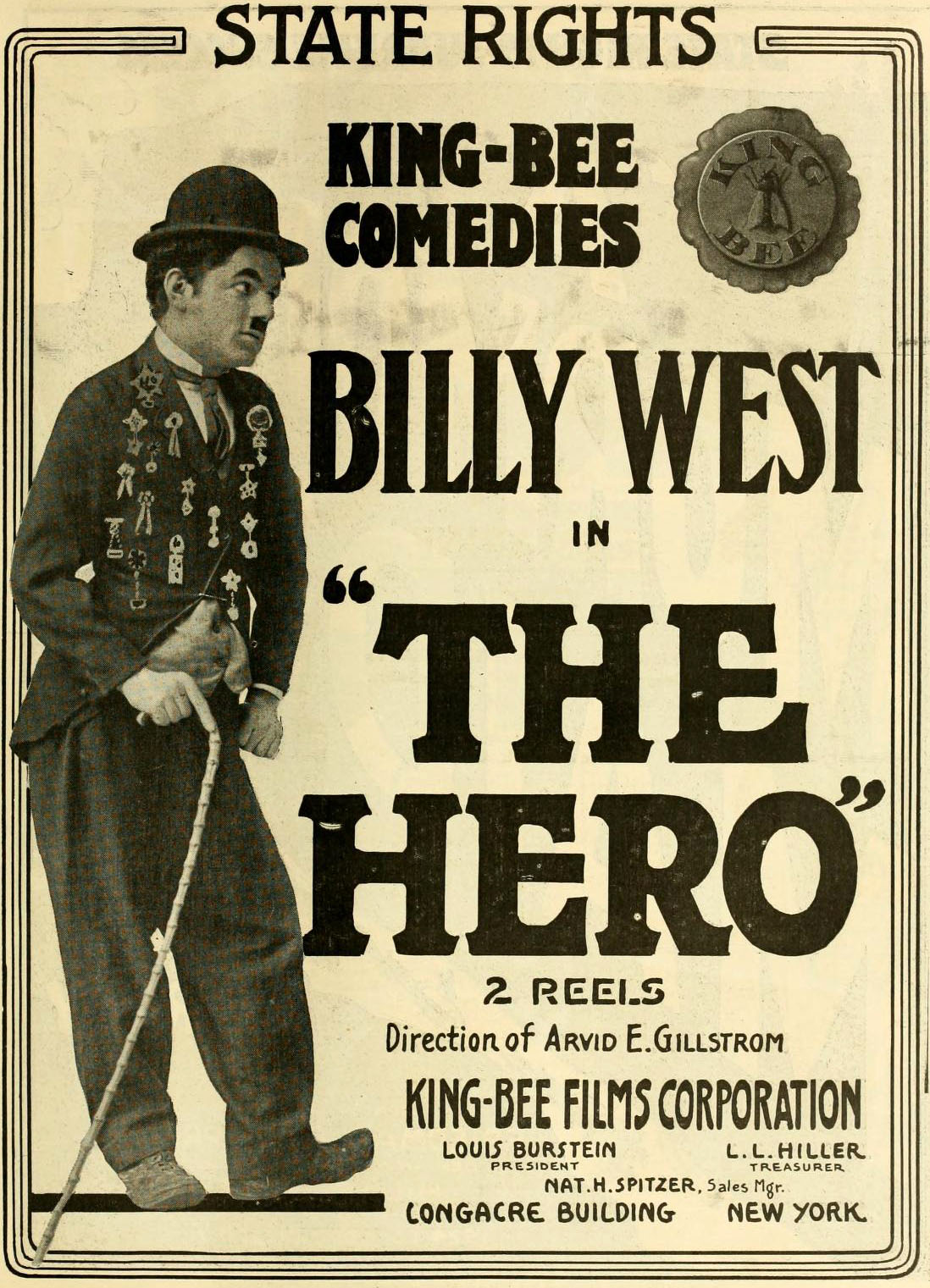
- Advertisement for the film
- Directed by: Arvid E. Gillstrom
- Produced by: Louis Burstein
- Starring: Billy West; Oliver Hardy
- Cinematography: Herman Obrock Jr.
- Edited by: Ben H. Cohen
- Distributed by: King Bee Studios
- Release date: June 1, 1917
- Running time: 2 reels
- Country: United States
- Language: Silent (English intertitles)

The Hero is a 1917 American silent two-reel comedy film starring Billy West and featuring Oliver Hardy (as Babe Hardy). The film is viewable free of charge on YouTube.

== Plot ==
A Chaplinesque figure opens a safe and takes out tramp clothes, hat and cane.

The tramp stands at a reception desk and steals the free snacks before going into the adjacent dance hall, which is crowded with dancers. He goes outside and a girl laughs at his appearance.

Meanwhile in a rich suburb, a fat man (Hardy) meets a girl who is happy to see him. He goes to sit with her mother on the porch but misses the swinging seat. The mother lets him take her daughter out.

In a park the tramp approaches a man (Count Bon Ami) pestering a girl sitting on a bench. He mocks the man. They have a duel using canes instead of swords. The man gives him his card but the tramp only gives a playing card in exchange.

In another part of the park a young man sits on a bench kissing his girlfriend. Two thugs spot them and pull a pistol. The Count tries to fight them but they grab the girl. The Count hides in the bushes. The tramp hears the commotion and runs up and fights the thugs and wins. The girl pretends to have fainted and when the tramp sits down she puts her head on his shoulder and he looks knowingly to camera. The young man reappears but the girl leaves arm in arm with the tramp. She takes him to her mother's house and tells mother of the fight. He gives her the calling card reading "Count Bon Ami".

The young man watches and follows the tramp to the dance hall where he works as a waiter. He takes a seat and tries to stay hidden.

A large brutish man takes a seat. The manager gets the hero to serve him and he brings him a spittoon and a cigar then steps back. He then brings a dusty bottle and pours him a large drink. He knocks him out with the bottle and drinks the drink himself. He goes back to the safe and puts on the tramp outfit again. He goes to a swanky party at the girl's mother's house. The young man is also a guest at the party.

After a female dancer performs, the tramp shows his own awkward but humorous dancing skills. He takes the girl and they stand by the punch bowl and drink. They go to the garden and he starts thinking of eggs. Baby chickens start dropping out of his trouser leg. He drinks more and more punch. They go back to the party and he starts falling over a lot then decides to leave and go back to his place of work, where a girl is singing a sad song.

However, the party goers have decided to relocate and they arrive at his dance hall where he is waiting on tables. His deception is uncovered.

== Cast ==
- Billy West as The Hero
- Oliver Hardy as Count Bon Ami - The Hero's Rival (credited as Babe Hardy)
- Ethel Marie Burton as A Society Girl (credited as Ethel Burton)
- Leo White as The Count
- Bud Ross as The Butler (credited as Budd Ross)
- Polly Bailey as The Mother (credited as Polly Van)
- Florence McLaughlin as A Shy Maiden (credited as Florence McLoughlin)
- Frank Lansler as A Thug
- Ben Ross as Proprietor
- Joe Cohen as The Dude
- Frank Bates as Bartender

== Reception ==
Like many American films of the time, The Hero was subject to cuts by city and state film censorship boards. The Chicago Board of Censors cut scenes of West fingering his nose at a bartender and of a man placing his legs on a girl's lap.

== See also ==
- List of American films of 1917
