= The Straight and Narrow =

1918 film

- Directed by: Charley Chase
- Produced by: Louis Burstein
- Starring: Billy West; Oliver Hardy
- Release date: June 1, 1918
- Country: United States
- Languages: Silent film English intertitles

The Straight and Narrow is a 1918 American silent comedy film featuring Oliver Hardy.

== Cast ==
- Billy West - Ex-convict
- Oliver Hardy - His former cellmate (as Babe Hardy)
- Leo White - Safecracker
- Ethel Marie Burton
- Rosemary Theby
- Myrtle Lind

== See also ==
- List of American films of 1918
- Oliver Hardy filmography
