= The Joke's on You (film) =

1925 film

- Directed by: Ralph Ceder
- Written by: Ralph Ceder
- Produced by: Billy West
- Starring: Oliver Hardy
- Distributed by: Cumberland Productions
- Release date: July 15, 1925
- Running time: 25 minutes
- Country: United States
- Languages: Silent film English intertitles

The Joke's on You, alternate title A Day's Vacation, is a 1925 American comedy film featuring Oliver Hardy.

== Plot ==
Although this film is listed in some books, and is on IMDB as "A Day's Vacation" (previously titled "The Joke's on You," neither title shows up in the usual film magazines of the era. A copy of the film online shows the title card as "A Day's Vacation," although it is posted as "The Joke's on You."

== Cast ==
- Billy West as Hubby
- Oliver Hardy as Wilbert Perkins (as Babe Hardy)
- Ethelyn Gibson as Wifey (as Ethlyn Gibson)

== See also ==
- List of American films of 1925
