= Playmates (1918 film) =

1918 film

- Directed by: Charley Chase
- Written by: Grace Gershon
- Produced by: Louis Burstein
- Starring: Billy West; Oliver Hardy
- Release date: July 1, 1918
- Running time: 14 minutes
- Country: United States
- Language: Silent (English intertitles)

Playmates is a 1918 American silent comedy film featuring Oliver Hardy.

== Plot summary ==
It is a silent comedy inspired by Charles Chaplin's film Easy Street (1917).

== Cast ==
- Billy West as Kid
- Oliver Hardy as Kid (as Babe Hardy)
- Bud Ross
- Fay Holderness
- Ethelyn Gibson
- Ethel Marie Burton
- Myrtle Lind
- Charley Chase as Dope fiend (as Charles Parrott)
