= Rivals (1925 American film) =

1925 film

- Directed by: Ward Hayes
- Produced by: Billy West
- Starring: Oliver Hardy
- Release date: May 15, 1925
- Running time: 18 minutes
- Country: United States
- Languages: Silent film English intertitles

Rivals is a 1925 American silent comedy film featuring Oliver Hardy.

== Cast ==
- Billy West as Billy
- Oliver Hardy as The Rival
- Ethelyn Gibson as Ethlyn (as Ethlyn Gibson)
- Ernie Young as Henry, the butler

== See also ==
- List of American films of 1925
