= The Band Master (1917 film) =

1917 film

- Directed by: Arvid E. Gillstrom
- Produced by: Louis Burstein
- Starring: Billy West; Oliver Hardy
- Distributed by: King Bee Studios
- Release date: December 1, 1917
- Country: United States
- Language: Silent (English intertitles)

The Band Master is a 1917 American silent comedy film featuring Oliver Hardy.

== Cast ==
- Billy West as Billy, bandleader
- Oliver Hardy (credited as Babe Hardy)

== Reception ==
Like many American films of the time, The Band Master was subject to cuts by city and state film censorship boards. For example, the Chicago Board of Censors cut, in Reel 1, scene of dough dropping from West after he sits in the pan, Reel 2, two scenes of West kicking woman, two scenes of West dropping trousers, two scenes of West bumping woman, and West expectorating into telephone receptical (with figure of woman).

== See also ==
- List of American films of 1917
