= The Last Alarm (1940 film) =

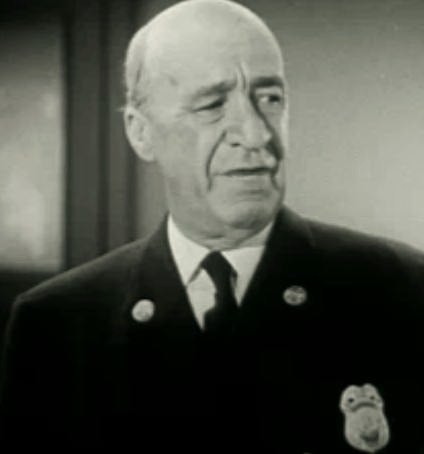
- J. Farrell MacDonald in the film
- Directed by: Billy West (as William West)
- Written by: Al Martin
- Produced by: Ted Richmond (associate producer); T.R. Williams (producer)
- Cinematography: Harry Neumann
- Edited by: Russell F. Schoengarth
- Music by: Lee Zahler
- Distributed by: Monogram Pictures
- Release date: June 25, 1940
- Running time: 61 minutes 54 minutes (Ontario, Canada)
- Country: United States
- Language: English

The Last Alarm is a 1940 American crime film directed by former Chaplin imitator Billy West, under the pseudonym "William West". Featured were veteran character actor J. Farrell MacDonald and juvenile leads Warren Hull and Polly Ann Young.

== Plot ==
Captain Jim Hadley, fire chief, has his retirement dinner after 40 years in the service. The next day, time hangs very heavy on his hands so that he even chats to a brush salesman (who has a perfect Elmer Fudd voice). Bored, he later visits his old fire station, Fire Company No.7, and talks to the men there, who are called out on a fire.

The Great Eastern Insurance Company is where Frank Rogers (who is interested in Hadley's daughter Joan) works. There have been a number of fires lately and arson is suspected. This thought is echoed at the Arson Bureau where Lieutenant King, chased up by the mayor, tells Henderson and Roberts he wants results. They know it is an arsonist who uses time bombs and gasoline. The arsonist turns out to be the keeper of an antiques shop, which Joan visits.

Jim is making plans for the future with Burt Stafford, who is due to retire soon. Burt is called out on a fire with the others and is very badly injured there. He dies in the hospital, with Jim standing beside him. The antiques man has called at the Hadley home to bring a salt and pepper set he had to do minor work on, which Joan had bought. She sees the gleam in his eyes when she lights a match.

Jim joins the arson investigation at the bureau, having had some experience when he was in the fire brigade. Spectroscopic analysis of wood found at the scene of the last big fire reveals that part of the burnt time bomb box Jim found was maple wood, so he, Henderson and Roberts scour the city for the maker of the boxes and who they sold them to.

At another big fire, Jim comes across a statue of Vulcan (the Roman god of fire) which the arsonist dropped, it being his inspiration. The arsonist gets it from Jim's unlocked car where he put it. Mention of this statue later—and the fact that Frank and Joan saw it in the antique shop window—provide a strong lead so they get a search warrant. They do not find any bomb-making equipment, but Jim finds wood shavings which later analysis reveals to be the same wood as that used for the time bomb box.

Jim and Frank go after the arsonist, who has lost his bureau tail. The arsonist goes to the basement of the Hadley house where he plants a time bomb. He goes upstairs and confronts Mrs. Hadley and Joan, and as Jim and Frank realize he may be back at their house—having been seen in the vicinity—the bomb goes off and the basement catches fire. The arsonist tells the women Jim should not have interfered in his work. The men bust in the door and while Frank escorts the women outside, Jim goes after the arsonist, who now babbling about being the god of fire. The arsonist falls down the basement steps into the burning basement and dies. Some time later there is another dinner in honor of Jim, who has got a new job—honorary fire chief of the city.

== Production ==
The Last Alarm marked a professional comeback for silent-screen comedian Billy West, once the premier Charlie Chaplin impersonator but idle since 1935. West signed with Monogram Pictures as a director in 1940, and a studio press release reminded movie columnists of West's screen credentials: "William West, director of Monogram's The Last Alarm, is a former screen comedian, having appeared in more than 200 comedies."

The Last Alarm contains actual footage of authentic fires, a fire station, and firemen rushing to the scene and fighting the flames. No acknowledgment was given to the fire service. The unnamed city was Los Angeles, with location footage filmed at Fire Station 27 in Hollywood.

== Cast ==
- J. Farrell MacDonald as Jim Hadley
- Polly Ann Young as Joan Hadley
- Warren Hull as Frank Rogers
- George Pembroke as Wendell
- Mary Gordon as Mrs. Hadley
- Joel Friedkin as Burt Stafford
- Bruce MacFarlane as Jack Henderson
- Eddie Hart as Dick Roberts
- Willard Hall as Briggs
- Charles Anthony Hughes Lieutenant King
- Charles R. Phipps as Stevens
- Eddie Kane as Fire Chief
- James Coughlin as Cummings
- Mike Mazurki as an onlooker (uncredited)
