= In and Out (1914 film) =

1914 film

- Starring: Wallace Beery; Leo White
- Production company: Essanay Studios
- Distributed by: General Film Company
- Release date: August 3, 1914
- Country: United States
- Language: Silent (English intertitles)

In and Out is a 1914 silent comedy film short featuring Wallace Beery and Leo White. The short was produced by the Essanay Film Manufacturing Company and distributed by the General Film Company.

== Plot ==
Hans and Fritz are two street musicians, who play the flute and bass, respectively. They struggle to get along with their fellow boarders, which causes them to be kicked from boarding house to boarding house. They finally find a house that will take them, where they are assailed by rodents and insects, with Fritz being carried away by an enormous bed-bug. Hans shoots the bed-bug to release Fritz, and they are chased from the boarding house. Escaping towards the lake, the mob forces them into the water, where Fritz uses his bass as a flotation device in the stormy waters, until it is safe for them to come ashore.
