= Flying Wild =

1941 film

- Film poster
- Directed by: Billy West (as William West)
- Written by: Al Martin
- Produced by: Sam Katzman
- Starring: Leo Gorcey; David Gorcey; Bobby Jordan; 'Sunshine Sammy' Morrison; Donald Haines
- Cinematography: Fred Jacklman, Jr.
- Edited by: Robert Golden
- Music by: Johnny Lange; Lew Porter
- Production company: Banner Pictures
- Distributed by: Monogram Pictures
- Release date: March 10, 1941
- Running time: 64 minutes
- Language: English

Flying Wild (aka The East Side Kids in Flying Wild and Air Devils) is a 1941 American comedy thriller film directed by the former Chaplin impersonator Billy West, under the pseudonym "William West". It was the fifth of 22 features in the East Side Kids series. The film is the team's first one in the spy film genre. The supporting cast includes Joan Barclay, Dave O'Brien and Herbert Rawlinson. It was distributed by Monogram Pictures.

== Plot ==
Pals Skinny, Danny Graham, Peewee, Algy Reynolds, and Scruno all work at the Reynolds Aviation Company, which is run by Algy's father. Muggs, however, is the only one of the kids who refuses to work, although he drives the gang to work in his jalopy. Once at the aviation company, he spends his time flirting with a flight nurse named Helen Munson who is in love with her test pilot boyfriend, Tom Lawson .

One day, when Tom's aircraft crashes at the plant airstrip, Reynolds suspects that the crash may have been the work of saboteurs. Later, at the airfield, Muggs jokingly appoints himself as the new operator of the flying ambulance owned by Dr. Richard Nagel and gives his pals a tour of the aircraft. Their playful games are soon brought to a halt by Nagel, the secret leader of a spy ring, who angrily orders the group off his aircraft.

Mr. Reynolds, certain that spies are working at the plant, asks Danny to act as a decoy so that the spies can be identified, and has him deliver to a downtown office a fake set of plans for a new bombsight. As Reynolds predicted, Nagel's men ambush Danny on his way to the office, but the plan goes awry when the detectives sent to trail Danny lose him. Danny eventually turns up unharmed some time later. When Muggs reports to Reynolds his suspicions that Nagel is behind the espionage ring, Reynolds dismisses the accusation as a product of the boy's imagination.

Not convinced by Reynolds that Nagel is innocent, Muggs and Danny begin their own investigation into Nagel, starting with a visit to the doctor on the pretext of a fake ailment. The visit turns up nothing, however, and when Danny and Muggs return to the hangar, a suspicious "accident" that was apparently meant to harm them leaves Peewee injured. While Peewee recovers at the hospital, Tom nearly loses his life when he is unable to make contact with the control tower for a landing. The controller is later found bound and gagged in the tower, prompting the kids to resume their investigation in earnest.

Helen provides the gang with further clues when she confirms that the ambulance plane was being flown on many unusual trips to Mexico, supposedly to deliver patients. When Helen tells the East Side Kids that a man named Forbes is the next "patient" to be transported, they rush to his house, where they find secret plans hidden in his head bandage. Disguising Danny as the transportee, the kids send Danny and Muggs on the flight to learn who is behind the espionage ring. Danny and Muggs soon find themselves in trouble, however, when Nagel, having found Forbes locked in his closet, tries to warn the pilot of the boys' ruse.

Meanwhile, Tom learns of the dangerous mission and goes after the flying ambulance in his own aircraft. Tom arrives in Mexico in time to save Danny and Muggs, and all the spies are arrested. Back at the plant, Reynolds rewards Muggs for his heroism by giving him a job as his driver, but his stint there is short-lived as he is soon distracted by a pretty woman and crashes the car with Reynolds in it.

== Cast ==
=== The East Side Kids ===
- Leo Gorcey as Muggs McGinnis
- Bobby Jordan as Danny Graham
- Sunshine Sammy Morrison as Scruno
- David Gorcey as Peewee
- Donald Haines as Skinny
- Eugene Francis as Algy Reynolds
- Bobby Stone as Louie

=== Additional Cast ===
- Joan Barclay as Helen Munson
- Dave O'Brien as Tom Lawson
- George Pembroke as Dr. Richard Nagel III
- Herbert Rawlinson as Mr. Reynolds
- Dennis Moore as George
- Forrest Taylor as Forbes
- Robert F. Hill as Woodward
- Mary Bovard as Maisie (uncredited)
- George Eldredge as Man (Note: Although listed in the credits, George Eldredge may not have appeared in the film.)
- Alden "Stephen" Chase as Jack, Henchman (uncredited)
- Al Ferguson as Henchman
- Jack Kenny as Henchman
- Carey Loftin as Henchman
- Bud Osborne as Henchman
- Eddie Parker as Henchman
- Dick Scott as Henchman

== Production ==
Robert F. Hill who plays the role of Woodward, was director of the first East Side Kids film. The working title of the film was Air Devils. Production was slated from mid-January to February, 1941.

A hair-raising stunt not scripted: Leo Gorcey was driving an open car into a scene, with the other kids piled behind him. Gorcey made the turn too fast and the moving car tipped over on its side. The terrified expressions on the gang's faces were one hundred percent real.

Flying Wild was last East Side Kids film for Eugene Francis. He was drafted for World War II service shortly after completing this film.

=== Aircraft used ===
Principal photography took place at the Alhambra, California airport. Aircraft in Flying Wild prominently featured a Ford 4-AT-35 Trimotoras a "Flying Ambulance". Other aircraft that are used included a Lockheed Vega 5C, Lockheed Model 12 Electra Junior Bellanca Cruisair, Travel Air 6000 and Harlow PJC-4 (in background).

== Production ==
The film's director was silent-screen comedian Billy West, using the pseudonym "William West". West had joined the Monogram staff in 1940, and the studio reminded movie columnists of West's credentials: "William West, director of Monogram's The Last Alarm, is a former screen comedian, having appeared in more than 200 comedies."

== Reception ==
Film critic Theodore Strauss in his review of Flying Wild, wrote in The New York Times, "The cycle of the Dead End Kids is slowing down. In fact, with 'Flying Wild', now at the Rialto, it has completely stalled. This time the talkative young toughs are out sleuthing for saboteurs in an airplane plant. Though the original group has been revised somewhat, they are still dropping the same hard-boiled gags with the same corner-of-the-mouth delivery and the plot harks back to some of the naïvetés of the nickelodeon era. 'Flying Wild' is downright tedious."

== Re-release ==
Flying Wild was re-released twice, once in 1949 by Favorite Films and again in 1952 by Savoy Films Corporation.

=== Home media ===
Since Flying Wild is in the public domain, there have been several releases from various companies.

== Notes ==
=== Bibliography ===
- Pendo, Stephen. Aviation in the Cinema. Lanham, Maryland: Scarecrow Press, 1985. ISBN 0-8-1081-746-2.
