= The Pest (1917 film) =

1917 film

- Directed by: Arvid E. Gillstrom
- Produced by: Louis Burstein
- Starring: Billy West; Oliver Hardy
- Release date: November 15, 1917
- Running time: 2 reels
- Country: United States
- Languages: Silent; English intertitles

The Pest (a.k.a. The Freeloader) is a 1917 American 2-reel silent comedy film featuring Oliver Hardy.

Plot: Charlie Chaplin impersonator Billy West annoys hotel guests, naively ending up in a compromising situation with a pajama-clad bride while her jealous husband, Babe Hardy, searches for her.

== Cast ==
- Billy West as The Pest
- Oliver Hardy (as Babe Hardy)
- Ethelyn Gibson
- Bud Ross as The Bellboy (as Budd Ross)
- Leo White as The Count

== See also ==
- List of American films of 1917
