= Billy West (silent film actor) =

American actor (1892–1975)

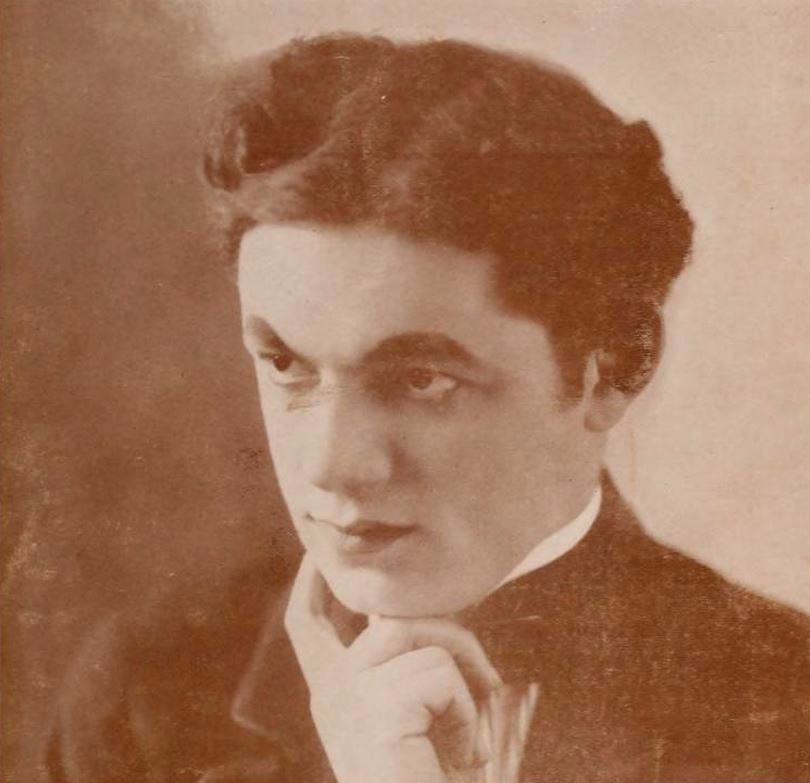
- West in 1917
- Born: Roy Benjamin Weisberg (or Weissberg); September 22, 1892; Russia
- Died: July 21, 1975 (aged 82); Hollywood, California, U.S.

Billy West (September 22, 1892 – July 21, 1975) was a silent film actor, producer, and director. Active during the silent film era, he is best known as the premier Charlie Chaplin impersonator. He was a star in his own right, appearing in more than 100 films for nine different companies. Beyond acting, he also directed short comedies in the 1910s and '20s, and produced films. West retired as an actor in 1935, when he was working in small roles for Columbia Pictures. In 1940 he resumed his career as a director, making three features for Monogram Pictures. He remained in Columbia's employ, behind the scenes, into the 1950s.

== Early career ==
The Candy Kid

Born Roy Benjamin Weisberg or Roy Benjamin Weissberg in the Russian Empire to a Jewish family, West emigrated to Chicago at the age of two with his family in 1894. He entered vaudeville as "William B. West" in 1909 and played in theaters across America until 1916.

He appeared in many short films, first in Apartment No. 13 in 1912. In 1916 film distributor Ike Schlank's Unicorn Film Company signed him for two-reel comedies, to be supported by a movie newcomer, Ethelyn Gibson. Unicorn failed after three films, and West began working for Unicorn's successor, the Belmont Film Company. Belmont managed a single two-reeler before it also collapsed.

== Chaplin impersonation ==
Film sales executive Nat H. Spitzer, representing the new King Bee studio (the "Bee" being the last initial of studio president Louis Burstein), signed Billy West to a five-year contract at the rate of $750 weekly ($19,833 in 2024). In 1917 movie theaters could not get enough Charlie Chaplin comedies -- Chaplin himself releasing new films too slowly to meet the demand. West appeared in imitation-Chaplin subjects at the remarkable rate of two per month. This steady exposure established West as a comedy star. West, wearing the identical "tramp" costume and makeup, copied Chaplin's movements and gestures so accurately that he is often mistaken for the genuine performer. Some West comedies were later re-released on the home-movie market as "Charlie Chaplin" pictures. Most of the West comedies of 1917–18 resemble the Chaplin comedies of 1916–17, with Oliver Hardy approximating the villainy of Eric Campbell and Chaplin's own character player Leo White playing similar roles for West. The King Bee shorts constitute most of the Billy West material available today; four of them were revived in 1961 for the Comedy Capers TV series showcasing silent comedies: The Pest, The Villain, The Band Master, and The Chief Cook.

Production began in Jacksonville, Florida, with Ethelyn Gibson, Oliver Hardy, and Leo White. Five films were produced before the unit moved to New York and then to the Bayonne, New Jersey studio formerly occupied by the Vim comedy company. Actresses Leatrice Joy and Ellen Burford joined the company in October 1917; West married Burford within the year. Louis Burstein moved the unit to Los Angeles, where he took over an older studio building from Al Christie.

King Bee was in a state of confusion, with executive turmoil, contradictory policies, and financial pressures. Louis Burstein was determined to showcase West in a five-reel feature: "The King Bee Film Corporation announces that it is considering the production of a five-reel comedy with Billy West as the star in a modern version of Shakespeare's Romeo and Juliet, with Billy West playing the great lover." Burstein soon abandoned the plan without giving a reason, while King Bee executives Arthur Werner and Charles Abrams broke away from the company to make their own comedies with vaudevillian Ray Hughes. Their Higrade Film Enterprises company also used Billy West in three shorts during this period of indecision. King Bee was finally absorbed by Bulls Eye [sic] Film Corporation under Milton L. Cohen. Despite the backstage troubles, the Billy West shorts remained popular with audiences and exhibitors; one Brooklyn theater showed Billy West comedies for 84 consecutive days, changing the bill once a week.

== New employer and legal dispute ==
West signed a new two-year contract with Bulls Eye in November 1918. He was now working with director Charles Parrott, later to become famous as Charley Chase. It was during this period that Charlie Chaplin himself saw the Billy West company filming on a Hollywood street and told West, "You're a damned good imitator."

West stayed with Bulls Eye for three months, completing four comedies before leaving the company on February 16, 1919 for Frederick J. Ireland's Emerald Motion Picture Company of Chicago, Illinois, to make a series of two-reel comedies. This signing was bitterly contested by West's former employers, Milton Cohen and Bulls Eye, which claimed to own not only the Billy West comedies but the comedian's stage name as well. Bulls Eye's injunction was denied by district court judge Samuel Alschuler.

Bulls Eye made more "Billy West Comedies" without West -- an uncredited Chaplin imitator imitating another Chaplin imitator -- prompting West to place full-page ads in trade papers announcing the duplicity, and insisting that he had left Bulls Eye's employ the previous February. Bulls Eye claimed that "Billy West" was a fictional character (even though the comedian had used the West stage name himself in vaudeville). Bulls Eye even admitted to the ruse in public: "[Roy B. Weisberg] wanted to supervise the making of our pictures, and because we would not allow him to run our business, he deliberately broke his contract and walked out of the studio. We have engaged an artist who will hereafter portray the character of Billy West." The identity of the new "Billy West" was finally divulged in July 1919: Harry Mann (1893-1965), like West a Russian-born comedian; Mann had been with Universal Pictures for six years. Former Chaplin colleague Mack Swain was hired to support Mann.

== Developments behind the scenes ==
Billy's brother, George West, was now working as general sales manager of West's own comedies.

Ellen Burford (1890-1960) worked in the Billy West comedies through the end of 1917, and then advanced to dramatic roles in feature films. She adopted a new screen name, Ellen Cassity (later Ellen Cassidy). When Billy West signed with Emerald and prepared to move to Chicago, Mrs. West evidently didn't want to relocate and disrupt her promising Hollywood career. West was bound to honor his contract, and the couple soon divorced.

West's original leading lady Ethelyn Gibson had replaced Burford in the King Bee shorts, and had stayed with him since. West married her. Former Chaplin assistant Chuck Reisner wrote and directed the Emerald shorts, and local boxer and wrestler Marty Cutler was hired as a comic foil. Interestingly, the two legal combatants in the Billy West lawsuit, Bulls Eye and Emerald, canceled each other out when both were absorbed by a new concern, R. C. Cropper's Reelcraft Pictures Corporation, in 1920. The Billy West series continued without interruption, with the genuine Billy West on the payroll, and Harry Mann returned to Universal.

== Character change ==
Billy West abandoned his Chaplin act in 1920. Reelcraft announced that West was now starring "as himself on his merits alone, discarding the derby hat, baggy trousers, shoes, and cane." His new characterizations were a top-hatted, pencil-mustached dandy -- the very opposite of his former tramp figure -- and a straw-hatted, brush-mustached innocent.

He signed with Joan Film Sales Corporation for a series of 12 comedies to be directed by Henry Kernan. After that commitment was completed, West signed with up-and-coming producer Harry Cohn of C. B. C. Film Exchange -- later Columbia Pictures -- for a series of "Sunbeam Comedies" (later "Sunrise Comedies"). Cohn had announced 26 West comedies, but only a few were made before financial problems forced Cohn to discontinue the series.

West and Gibson, again unemployed, turned to the vaudeville stage and received good reviews. They moved on to the independent Smart Films, Inc., operating first at the Mirror Studio in Glendale, New York, and then the Tilford Studio in New York City. West hired musical-revue producer Will Morrissey to direct. Smart announced 24 two-reel comedies, but the venture failed after only two productions. West and Morrissey, both cast adrift, formed a vaudeville act.

== Producer ==
After so many false starts with hopeful producers, West became his own producer in 1924, releasing through Dr. William E. Shallenberger's Arrow Pictures Corporation, established in 1914. The comedian averaged one Billy West comedy monthly. West also picked comedian Bobby Ray from the Arrow stock company and teamed him with West's former screen foil Oliver "Babe" Hardy for a brief series of slapstick comedies.

Ethelyn Gibson was still his leading lady, but theirs had become an uneasy alliance. Gibson, apparently tiring of West's professional setbacks and relocations, had deserted him in 1923 for Leon Glaser, "reported to be a wealthy broker", and signed a prenuptial agreement with Glaser in 1926. West and Gibson continued to work together; he went on to produce a separate series of "Winnie Winkle" comedies starring Gibson. West did attempt to reconcile with Gibson to no avail; he was granted a divorce on May 11, 1928. Gibson's own plans were upset in January 1929, when her intended bridegroom Leon Glaser suddenly voided his prenuptial agreement and married Betty Cohen, daughter of wealthy diamond merchant A. B. Cohen.

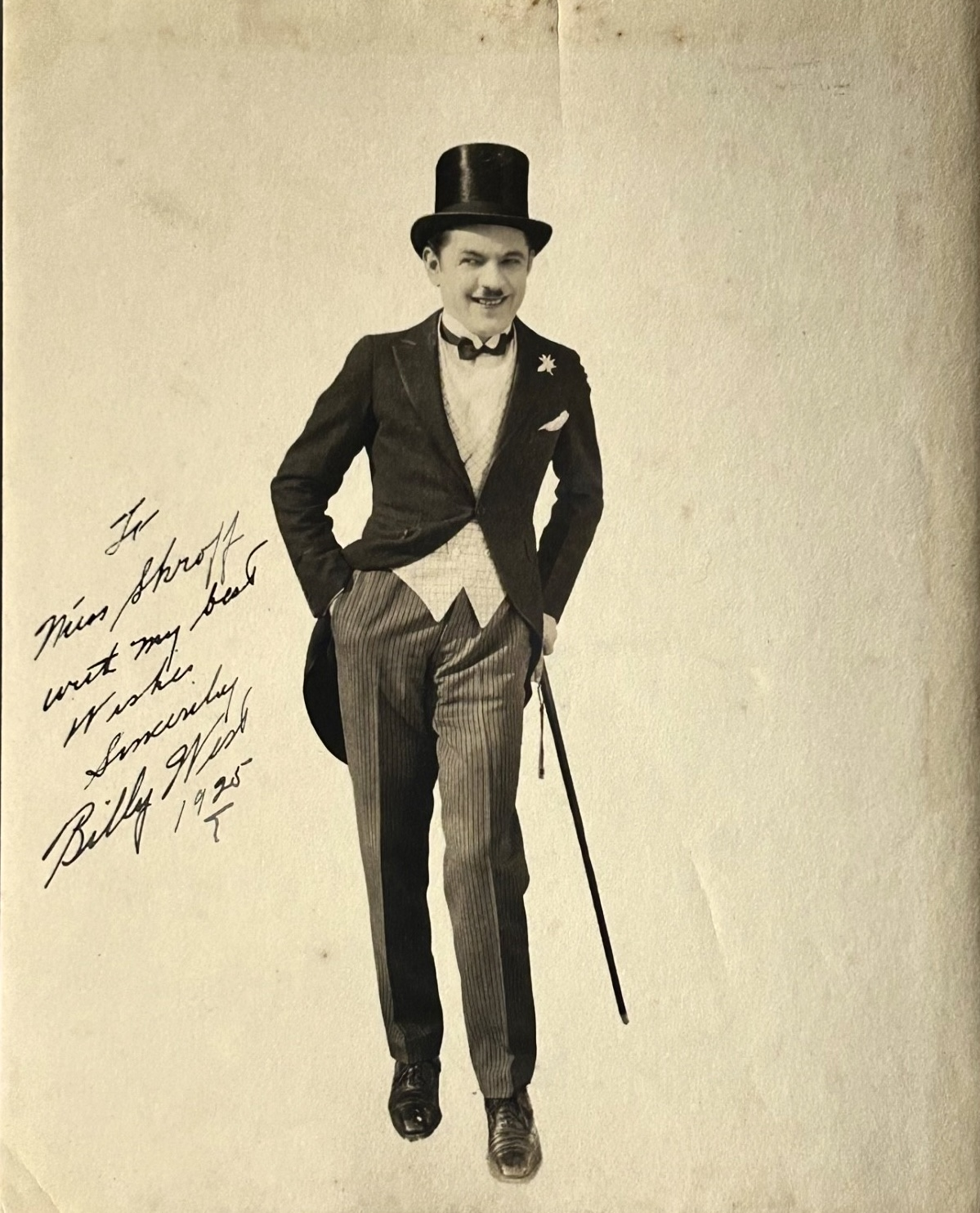
Billy West, 1925

In 1925 Billy West launched a production partnership with his brother George West. Billy remained in California while George handled the business interests in New York. The company was known as West Brothers Productions. Filming at the Fine Arts studio in Hollywood and releasing through the Weiss Bros. Artclass corporation ("The Diamond Setting of Every Program"), West Brothers made three concurrent series of two-reel comedies under the "Happiness Comedies" brand name: Winnie Winkle, based on the Martin Branner comic strip; Hairbreadth Harry, based on the C. W. Kahles comic; and Izzie and Lizzie, based on the Jewish-Irish comic situations popularized in Abie's Irish Rose.

In July 1925 Billy West, evidently noting the success of feature films with short-subject stars Buster Keaton, Harold Lloyd, and Larry Semon, decided to produce his own feature-length comedies, starring himself. These were to be released by independent producer W. Ray Johnston, formerly vice president of Arrow and now heading his own Rayart Pictures -- the future Monogram Pictures. Four five-reel features were made. In Thrilling Youth (1926) West appeared as a straw-hatted, mustached college graduate turned businessman, in the manner of then-popular star Charley Chase. Slapstick gags were toned down in favor of human-interest situations, in the manner of Harold Lloyd. West's character was thus not very original, although the films were successful within Rayart's market of small neighborhood theaters. Rayart followed the West features with two-reel comedies, and kept them in release for several years; the 1927 short One Hour to Play was still circulating in 1930.

In 1928 West directed two-reel comedies for Fox Film but, like West's other disappointments, the engagement ended prematurely: Fox suspended short-comedy production. George LeMaire signed West to direct talking comedies for Pathé in New York. Plans soon fell through -- LeMaire completed enough films for the season, but without West's services -- and by early 1930 West was back in Hollywood, on the staff of producer Larry Darmour, as comedy writer and gag man.

In 1932 Variety's Paris correspondent found "Billy West doing an Aimee MacPherson, staging revival meetings in his apartment." He returned to Hollywood later that year and took small roles in sound features and shorts, freelancing for various studios. He worked steadily through 1935 and then retired as an actor.

== Old acquaintance ==
Most of his later assignments were for Harry Cohn's Columbia Pictures. Cohn remembered him from their C. B. C. two-reel-comedy days, and perhaps wanted to make amends for having to suspend his West series in 1922. Cohn gave him a job as an assistant director. Cohn also gave West and his third wife Marian the opportunity to operate a quick-service restaurant on the studio premises. Mr. and Mrs. West ran the Columbia Grill on Gower Street for 19 years. In another opportunity possibly orchestrated by Cohn, West became a distributor for the nationally popular Screeno giveaway game in 1938.

== Another former benefactor ==
In 1940 Billy West reconnected with Ray Johnston, who had released West's silent features in the mid-1920s. Johnston was now president of Monogram Pictures, a successful producer and distributor of low-budget fare for neighborhood theaters. Monogram often gave opportunities to silent-era actors, cameramen, and directors, and Johnston gave the 47-year-old West a chance to join the Monogram staff as a director. West would use the pseudonym "William West". Monogram reminded movie columnists of West's silent-screen credentials: "William West, director of The Last Alarm, is a former screen comedian, having appeared in more than 200 comedies." West worked at Monogram infrequently -- he was already employed at Columbia -- and had only three assignments, each filmed in two weeks' time: the Warren Hull crime drama The Last Alarm (1940), the East Side Kids comedy Flying Wild (1941), and the Harry Langdon-Charley Rogers comedy Double Trouble (1941). He retained his membership in the Directors Guild of America but never directed a film again. He returned to his steady job at the Columbia Grill.

== Later life ==
West's long history of professional setbacks and hardships seems to have embittered him, because in 1950 Variety printed news of a lawsuit: "Billy West, former film actor who wants to forget his film career, filed suit for $30,000 against Paramount, charging invasion of privacy in a picture Riding High. West declares the studio used footage showing him as an actor in an old Columbia production Broadway Bill made in 1934, but handed him no compensation." The matter was presumably settled out of court because there was no follow-up report.

Billy West was still a member of the Directors Guild when he suffered a heart attack on July 21, 1975, while leaving the Hollywood Park racetrack. He died on the way to the hospital at age 82, survived by his wife Marian. He is buried at Forest Lawn Cemetery in Los Angeles.

Historians Kalton C. Lahue and Sam Gill, in their book Clown Princes and Court Jesters, wrote: "Billy's tramp was another dimension of Charlie's. Where Chaplin's little fellow exhibited a tendency toward cynicism, tempered with a degree of hopeful optimism (which was always badly bent by the fade out), Billy's tramp was the cheerful optimist who is treated pretty decently by fate. Most of his problems came about as a result of his own carefree ineptitude."

== Filmography ==
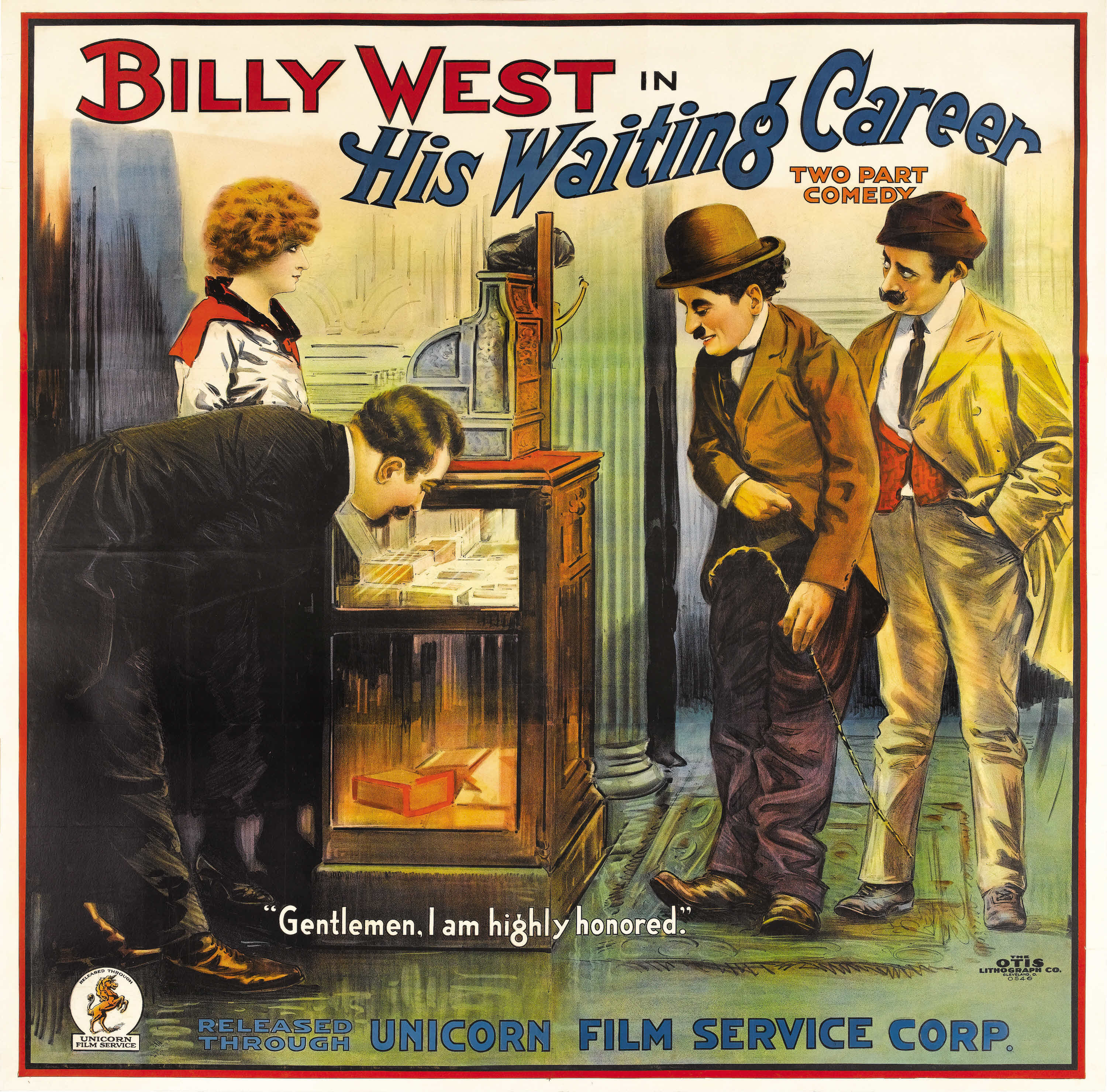
His Waiting Career (1916)

=== Actor ===
1. Apartment No. 13 (1912) (uncomfirmed)

Unicorn Film Service (1916)

1. His Married Life (December 1, 1916)
2. Bombs and Boarders (1916)
3. His Waiting Career (1916)

King Bee Film Corporation (1917-1918)

1. Back Stage (May 15, 1917) (A print is held at Nederlands Filmmuseum)
2. The Hero (June 1, 1917)
3. Dough Nuts (June 15, 1917)
4. Cupid's Rival (July 1, 1917)
5. The Villain (July 15, 1917)
6. The Millionaire (August 1, 1917) (Nederlands Filmmuseum)
7. The Goat (August 15, 1917)
8. The Fly Cop (September 15, 1917)
9. The Chief Cook (October 1, 1917)
10. The Candy Kid (October 15, 1917)
11. The Hobo (November 1, 1917)
12. The Pest (working title: The Freeloader) (November 15, 1917)
13. The Band Master (December 1, 1917)
14. The Slave (December 15, 1917)
15. The Stranger (working title: The Prospector) (January 1, 1918)
16. His Day Out (working title: The Barber) (January 15, 1918)
17. The Rogue (February 15, 1918)
18. The Orderly (March 1, 1918)
19. The Scholar (March 15, 1918)
20. The Messenger (April 1, 1918)
21. The Handy Man (May 1, 1918)
22. Bright and Early (May 15, 1918)
23. The Straight and Narrow (June 1, 1918)
24. Playmates (July 1, 1918)
25. Beauties in Distress (working title: The King of the Volcano) (July 15, 1918)

Higrade Film Enterprises (1918)

1. Bunco Billy (1918)
2. Bombs and Bull (1918)
3. Billy in Harness (1918)

Bull's Eye Film Corporation (1918-1919)

1. He's in Again (acquired from King Bee; working title: A Good Day) (December 15, 1918)
2. A Rolling Stone (January 20, 1919)
3. Ship Ahoy! (February, 1919)
4. The Chauffeur (1919)
5. Lured (1919)

The following comedies were released as "Billy West Comedies" with Harry Mann starring as "Billy West":

1. Flirts (1919)
2. Coppers and Scents (1919)
3. Out of Tune (1919)
4. Soaked (1919)
5. The Wrong Flat (newspaper ads: January 28, 1919 and July 19, 1919)
6. Her First False Hare (May 19, 1919)
7. Her Nitro Night (December 1, 1919) (1 reel survives at Library and Archives Canada)
8. Haunted Hearts (December 15, 1919)

Reelcraft (1920)

1. The Strike Breaker (March, 1920)
2. The Masquerader (April, 1920)
3. Brass Buttons (April, 1920)
4. The Dreamer (May, 1920)
5. The Beauty Shop (May, 1920)
6. The Artist (June, 1920)
7. Hard Luck (June, 1920)
8. What Next? (July, 1920)
9. Italian Love (July, 1920)
10. Hands Up (August, 1920)
11. Going Straight (August, 1920)
12. The Dodger
13. Mustered Out
14. Happy Days
15. Foiled
16. Cleaning Up
17. Blue Blood and Bevo

Joan Comedies (1920-1921)

1. Sweethearts (November, 1920)
2. Service Stripes (December, 1920)
3. He's In Again (January, 1921)
4. The Conquering Hero (February, 1921)
5. Best Man Wins (March, 1921)
6. He Loves Her Still (April, 1921)
7. Why Marry? (May 1921)
8. Happy Days (June, 1921)
9. Italian Love (August, 1921?)
10. The Darn Fool (October, 1921?)
11. The Sap (1921)

Sunrise Comedies (1922), released by C.B.C.

1. Don't Be Foolish (1922)
2. You'd Be Surprised (1922)
3. Wedding Dumbbells (1922)
4. I'm Here (1922)

Smart Films (1922)

1. Why Worry? (1922) (Not related to Why Worry? from 1923)
2. It's Going to Be a Coal Winter (1922)

Broadway Comedies (1923-1925), released by Arrow

1. One Exciting Evening (October 1, 1923)
2. Be Yourself (November 1, 1923)
3. Hello Bill (December 1, 1923)
4. Pay Up (January 1, 1924)
5. Hello, Stranger (February 1, 1924)
6. The Nervous Reporter (March 1, 1924)
7. Not Wanted (April 1, 1924)
8. Oh, Billy! (May 1, 1924)
9. Dyin' for Love (May 15, 1924)
10. Two After One (June 1, 1924)
11. That's That (July 1, 1924)
12. Don't Slip (September 1, 1924)
13. Line's Busy (September 15, 1924)
14. Love (October 15, 1924)
15. Meet Father (November 15, 1924)
16. Watch Out! (December 15, 1924)
17. Phone Troubles (newspaper ad: July 5, 1924)
  1. This could be an alternate title for Line's Busy.
18. Midnight Watch (newspaper ad: August 29, 1924)
19. So Long, Dad (newspaper ad: September 10, 1924)
20. Believe Me (working title: Start Here) (January 15, 1925)
21. Hard-Hearted Husbands (February 15, 1925)
22. Rivals (March 15, 1925)
23. Copper Butt-Ins (April 15, 1925)
24. West Is West (May 15, 1925)
25. Fiddlin' Around (June 15, 1925)
26. The Joke's On You (working title: A Day's Vacation) (July 15, 1925)
27. So Long, Bill (August 15, 1925)
28. Hard Boiled Yeggs (1926)

Rayart Pictures (1926-1927)

1. Thrilling Youth (August 3, 1926; feature film)
2. Oh, Billy, Behave (October 27, 1926; feature film)
3. The Trouble Chaser (March 9, 1927; feature film)
4. Lucky Fool (working title: Help! Police!) (April 18, 1927; feature film)
5. One Hour to Play (1927; two-reel short subject)

Later appearances

1. The Shadow of the Eagle (1932, serial)
2. Ex-Lady (1933)
3. Jimmy the Gent (1934)
4. The Whole Town's Talking (1935)

=== Producer, Bobby Ray & Babe Hardy comedies ===
1. Stick Around (1925)
2. Hey, Taxi! (1925)
3. Hop to It! (1925)
4. They All Fall (1925)

=== Director, Monogram Pictures ===
1. The Last Alarm (1940)
2. Flying Wild (1941)
3. Double Trouble (1941)
