= The Goat (1917 film) =

1917 film

- Directed by: Arvid E. Gillstrom
- Written by: Louis Burstein
- Produced by: Louis Burstein
- Starring: Billy West; Oliver Hardy
- Production company: King Bee Studios
- Release date: August 15, 1917
- Country: United States
- Language: Silent (English intertitles)

The Goat, also known as The Genius, is a 1917 American 2-reel silent comedy film featuring Oliver Hardy. Like many American films of the time, The Goat was subject to cuts by city and state film censorship boards. The Chicago Board of Censors cut, in reel 2, the man raising the girl's leg to strike a match on her shoe, all scenes of Billy West in the wrong bed, and the holding of hands across twin beds.

== Plot ==
The story follows Billy, a kindhearted but somewhat bumbling inventor. His overly tender and accommodating nature continually lands him in matrimonial misadventures. At one point, he finds himself coerced into assuming the paternity of a child that does not belong to him. This deception plunges him into a series of highly amusing and increasingly equivocal situations that lead to hectic chases and chaotic misunderstandings.

== Cast ==
- Billy West as An Inventor
- Oliver Hardy as His Neighbor (credited as Babe Hardy)
- Bud Ross
- Leo White
- Florence McLaughlin
- Polly Bailey
- Joe Cohen
- Ethelyn Gibson
- Agnes Neilson
