= Arvid E. Gillstrom =

Swedish film director

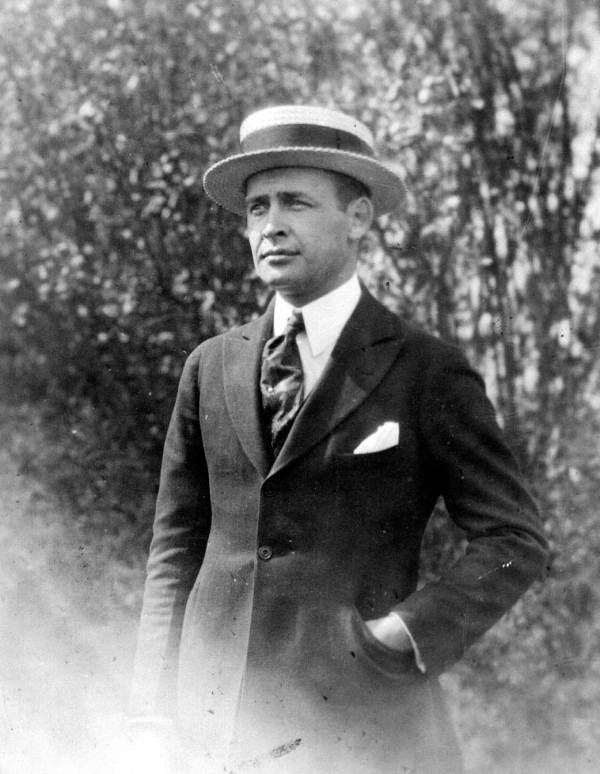
- Taken around 1916
- Born: Arvid Evald Gyllström; 13 August 1889; Gothenburg, Sweden
- Died: 21 May 1935 (aged 45); Hollywood, California, USA
- Occupation: Film director
- Years active: 1915 - 1934

Arvid E. Gillstrom (13 August 1889 – 21 May 1935) was a film director and screenwriter from Sweden. He was born Arvid Evald Gyllström in Annedal, Gothenburg, Sweden. He married Ethel Burton in 1917. Gillstrom died in Hollywood, California.

== Selected filmography ==
- Their Social Splash (1915)
- Back Stage (1917)
- The Hero (1917)
- Dough Nuts (1917)
- The Villain (1917)
- The Millionaire (1917)
- The Goat (1917)
- The Fly Cop (1917)
- The Chief Cook (1917)
- The Candy Kid (1917)
- The Hobo (1917)
- The Pest (1917)
- The Band Master (1917)
- The Slave (1917)
- The Stranger (1918)
- The Rogue (1918)
- His Day Out (1918)
- The Orderly (1918)
- The Scholar (1918)
- The Messenger (1918)
- Swat the Spy (1918)
- Tell It to the Marines (1918)
- Smiles (1919)
- Leave It to Gerry (1924)
- Legionnaires in Paris (1927)
- The Melancholy Dame(1929)
- Oft in the Silly Night (1929)
- The Framing of the Shrew (1929)
- Please (1933)
- Just an Echo (1934)
