= The Stranger (1918 film) =

1918 film

- Directed by: Arvid E. Gillstrom
- Written by: Rex Taylor
- Produced by: Louis Burstein
- Starring: Billy West; Oliver Hardy
- Distributed by: King Bee Studios
- Release date: January 1, 1918
- Running time: 20 minutes
- Country: United States
- Language: Silent (English intertitles)

The Stranger is a 1918 American 2-reel silent comedy film featuring Oliver Hardy. Prints of this film survive in private collections and it has been released on DVD.

== Cast ==
- Billy West as The Prospector
- Leatrice Joy as Susie
- Bud Ross as Susie's Father (credited as Budd Ross)
- Oliver Hardy as Oliver, the saloonkeeper
- Leo White as The Greaser

== Reception ==
Like many American films of the time, The Stranger was subject to cuts by city and state film censorship boards. For example, the Chicago Board of Censors cut, in Reel 2, the intertitle "The Hall of Joy where wine, women and song hold forth temptations to strangers".

== See also ==
- List of American films of 1918
