= The Messenger (1918 film) =

1918 film

- Directed by: Arvid E. Gillstrom
- Produced by: Louis Burstein
- Starring: Billy West; Oliver Hardy
- Distributed by: King Bee Studios
- Release date: April 1, 1918
- Running time: 2 reels
- Country: United States
- Language: Silent (English intertitles)

The Messenger is a 1918 American silent comedy film featuring Oliver Hardy.

== Cast ==
- Billy West as Billy, the messenger boy
- Oliver Hardy (credited as Babe Hardy)
- Ethel Marie Burton
- Leatrice Joy
- Leo White
- Joe Bordeaux

== Reception ==
Like many American films of the time, The Messenger was subject to cuts by city and state film censorship boards. For example, in Reel 1, the Chicago Board of Censors cut four scenes showing Billy looking at young woman with her skirt raised, exposing her posterior, and a scene of Billy dropping his trousers and standing in his underwear.

== See also ==
- List of American films of 1918
