= Leo White =

German-American actor (1873–1948)

Leo Herbert White
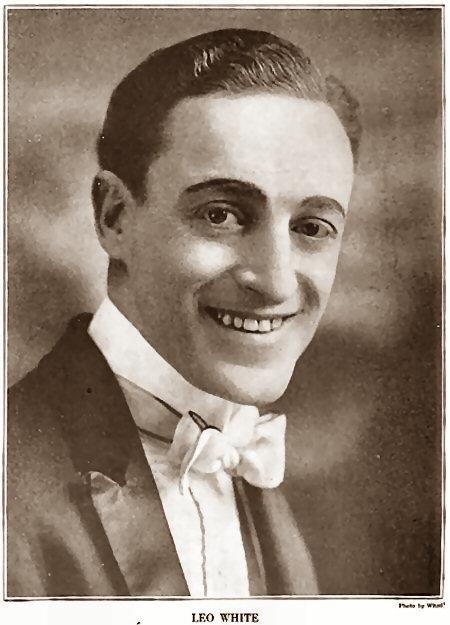
- Photoplay, 1917
- Born: November 10, 1873; Graudenz, Kingdom of Prussia, German Empire
- Died: September 20, 1948 (aged 74); Glendale, California, U.S.
- Resting place: Grand View Memorial Park Cemetery
- Years active: 1911–1948

Leo White (November 10, 1873 – September 20, 1948) was a German-born British-American film and stage actor who appeared as a character actor in many Charlie Chaplin films.

== Biography ==
Born in Germany to Julius White and Ida Berg White, White grew up in England where he began his stage career. He was brought to the United States under the aegis of Daniel Frohman, a Broadway producer. He started his film career in 1911 and in 1913 moved to the Essanay Studios. In 1915, he began appearing in Chaplin's comedies and continued through Chaplin's Mutual Film comedies. His last appearance in a Chaplin film was a small role in The Great Dictator, released in 1940.

White also acted in and directed Triple Trouble (1918), Essanay's last Chaplin release. Chaplin himself acknowledged Triple Trouble in his autobiography but did not actually participate in its production. (White filmed new scenes around existing footage of Chaplin.)

White typically played dapper, continental villains or noblemen in films, and this typecast him for the rest of his screen career. Well into the 1940s, he was still playing excitable Frenchmen in short subjects and feature films. Before his death in 1948, White had appeared in over 400 films.

White died in Glendale, California, of a heart attack at the age of 74 on September 20, 1948. He was interred at Grand View Memorial Park Cemetery in Glendale.

== Filmography ==
- In and Out (1914, Short) - Fritz
- One Wonderful Night (1914) - Jean de Curtois
- Leading Lizzie Astray (1914, Short) - Cafe Patron (uncredited)
- Madame Double X (1914, Short) - His Son (uncredited)
- Fatty's Faithful Fido (1915, Short)
- His New Job (1915, Short) - Office Receptionist / Actor as Hussar Officer (uncredited)
- A Night Out (1915, Short) - 'French' Dandy / Desk Clerk (uncredited)
- The Champion (1915, Short) - Crooked Gambler (uncredited)
- In the Park (1915, Short) - The Count - Elegant Masher (uncredited)
- A Jitney Elopement (1915, Short) - Count Chloride de Lime - Edna's Suitor (uncredited)
- The Tramp (1915, Short) - First Thief (uncredited)
- Work (1915, Short) - The Secret Lover (uncredited)
- A Woman (1915, Short) - Idler in the Park (uncredited)
- The Bank (1915, Short) - Clerk (uncredited)
- Shanghaied (1915, Short) - Third Shanghaied Seaman (uncredited)
- A Night in the Show (1915, Short) - Frenchman / Negro in Balcony (uncredited)
- Police (1916, Short) - Fruitseller / Flop House Manager / Policeman (uncredited)
- The Floorwalker (1916, Short) - Elegant Customer
- The Fireman (1916, Short) - Owner of the Burning House
- The Vagabond (1916, Short) - Old Gypsy woman
- The Count (1916, Short) - Count Broko (uncredited)
- Max Wants a Divorce (1917, Short) - Loony Dancer (uncredited)
- Back Stage (1917, Short)
- The Hero (1917, Short) - The Count
- Dough Nuts (1917, Short) - Camembert, the Proprietor
- Cupid's Rival (1917, Short) - Rich Artist
- The Villain (1917, Short)
- The Millionaire (1917, Short)
- The Goat (1917, Short)
- The Fly Cop (1917, Short) - The Mayor
- The Chief Cook (1917, Short) - Ham
- The Candy Kid (1917, Short)
- The Hobo (1917, Short) - Mr. Fox
- The Pest (1917, Short) - The Count
- The Slave (1917, Short) - The Vizier
- The Stranger (1918, Short) - The Greaser
- His Day Out (1918, Short)
- The Rogue (1918, Short) - The Count
- The Orderly (1918, Short)
- Amarilly of Clothes-Line Alley (1918) - Manicurist (uncredited)
- The Scholar (1918, Short)
- The Messenger (1918, Short)
- The Handy Man (1918, Short)
- Bright and Early (1918, Short) - An honest crook
- The Straight and Narrow (1918, Short) - Safecracker
- Triple Trouble (1918, Short) - Count (uncredited)
- The Brazen Beauty (1918) - Tony Dewey
- He's in Again (1918, Short) - The Prize Fighter
- Blind Youth (1920) - French Louis
- An Adventuress (1920) - Prince Halbere
- Fists and Fodder (1920, Short) - A Rival
- Mrs. Temple's Telegram (1920) - John Brown
- Pals and Pugs (1920, Short) - Beau Brummel
- The Devil's Pass Key (1920) - Amadeus Malot
- You Never Can Tell (1920) - Mr. Renan
- Married to Order (1920, Short) - The Milkman
- The Rookie's Return (1920) - Henri
- Her Sturdy Oak (1921) - Archibald Mellon
- Keeping Up with Lizzie (1921) - Count Louis Roland
- The Rage of Paris (1921) - Jean Marot
- Headin' West (1922) - Honey Giroux
- Beyond the Rocks (1922) - Pageant Director (uncredited)
- Blood and Sand (1922) - Antonio
- Breaking Into Society (1923)
- Why Worry? (1923)
- In Search of a Thrill (1923)
- Sporting Youth (1924)
- When a Girl Loves (1924)
- Charley's Aunt (1925)
- An Enemy Of Men (1925)
- One Year to Live (1925)
- The Tower of Lies (1925)
- The Masked Bride (1925)
- Ben-Hur (1925) - Sanballat
- A Desperate Moment (1926)
- The Girl from Montmartre (1926)
- The Far Cry (1926)
- The Beautiful Cheat (1926)
- The Blonde Saint (1926)
- On the Front Page (1926)
- McFadden's Flats (1927)
- See You in Jail (1927)
- The Girl from Gay Paree (1927)
- A Hero for a Night (1927)
- How to Handle Women (1928)
- Manhattan Knights (1928)
- Thunder Riders (1928)
- Our Blushing Brides (1930)
- Sin Takes a Holiday (1930)
- Call of the Flesh (1930)
- Anna Christie (1930)
- Monkey Business (1931)
- This Modern Age (1931)
- The Beast of the City (1932)
- Arsène Lupin (1932)
- Grand Hotel (1932)
- Rasputin and the Empress (1932)
- Lady for a Day (1933)
- The Kennel Murder Case (1933)
- The Invisible Man (1933)
- Meet the Baron (1933) uncredited, as chef
- Viva Villa! (1934)
- The Scarlet Empress (1934)
- The Thin Man (1934)
- British Agent (1934)
- Black Fury (1935)
- The Case of the Curious Bride (1935)
- A Night at the Opera (1935)
- The Walking Dead (1936)
- Bullets or Ballots (1936)
- Satan Met a Lady (1936)
- Cain and Mabel (1936)
- The Prince and the Pauper (1937)
- Marked Woman (1937)
- Charlie Chan at Monte Carlo (1937)
- Tovarich (1937)
- Angels with Dirty Faces (1938)
- Four's a Crowd (1938)
- Nancy Drew... Reporter (1939)
- Nancy Drew... Trouble Shooter (1939)
- Each Dawn I Die (1939)
- Blackmail (1939)
- The Roaring Twenties (1939)
- An Angel from Texas (1940)
- Gambling on the High Seas (1940)
- The Sea Hawk (1940)
- City for Conquest (1940)
- The Great Dictator (1940)
- The Letter (1940)
- Meet John Doe (1941)
- The Great Lie (1941)
- Million Dollar Baby (1941)
- Dangerously They Live (1941)
- All Through the Night (1941)
- Yankee Doodle Dandy (1942)
- The Gay Sisters (1942)
- Eatin' on the Cuff or The Moth Who Came to Dinner (1942) - Piano-Playing Narrator (uncredited) - voice dubbed by Mel Blanc
- George Washington Slept Here (1942)
- Gentleman Jim (1942)
- Casablanca (1942) - Emile - Waiter (uncredited)
- Background to Danger (1943)
- Appointment in Berlin (1943)
- Northern Pursuit (1943)
- Mr. Skeffington (1944)
- The Adventures of Mark Twain (1944)
- Arsenic and Old Lace (1944) - Man in Phone Booth
- Hotel Berlin (1945)
- Lady on a Train (1945)
- Devotion (1946)
- Night and Day (1946)
- A Stolen Life (1946)
- Cloak and Dagger (1946)
- The Verdict (1946)
- The Unfaithful (1947)
- My Wild Irish Rose (1947)
- Silver River (1948)
- Winter Meeting (1948)
- My Dream Is Yours (1949)
- Look for the Silver Lining (1949)
- The Fountainhead (1949)
