= The Villain (1917 film) =

1917 film

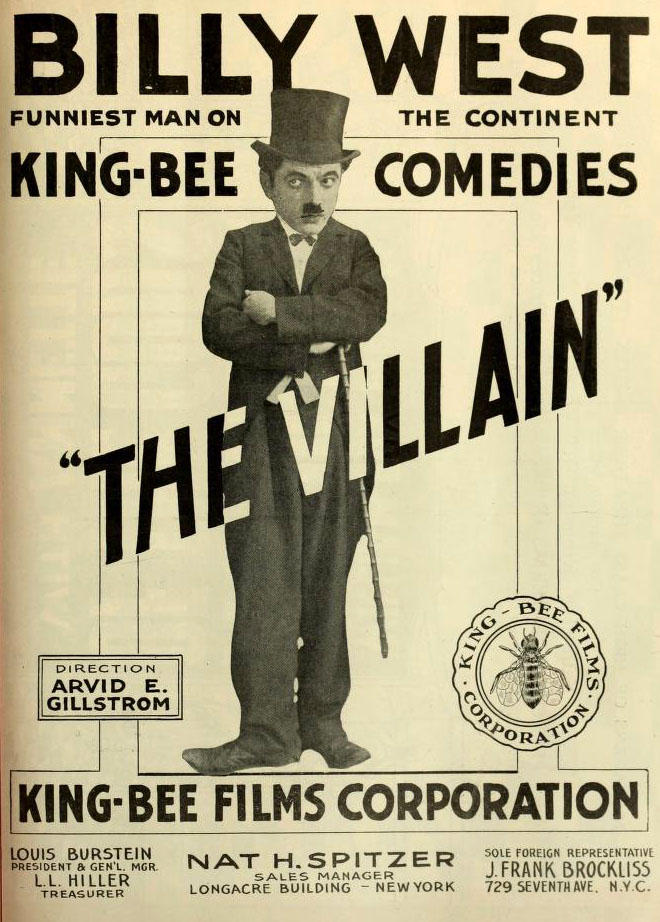
- Advertisement for the film
- Directed by: Arvid E. Gillstrom
- Produced by: Louis Burstein
- Starring: Billy West; Oliver Hardy
- Cinematography: Herman Obrock Jr.
- Edited by: Ben H. Cohen
- Release date: July 15, 1917
- Country: United States
- Language: Silent with English intertitles

The Villain is a 1917 American 2-reel silent comedy film featuring Oliver Hardy.

== Cast ==
- Billy West as Billy
- Oliver Hardy as Babe (billed as Babe Hardy)
- Florence McLaughlin as Florence (billed as Florence McLoughlin)
- Bud Ross as Budd (as Budd Ross)
- Ethelyn Gibson
- Leo White
- Joe Cohen
