= The Fly Cop =

1917 film

- Directed by: Arvid E. Gillstrom
- Produced by: Louis Burstein
- Starring: Billy West; Oliver Hardy
- Release date: September 1, 1917
- Running time: 2 reels
- Country: United States
- Language: Silent (English intertitles)

The Fly Cop is a 1917 lost American 2-reel silent comedy film featuring Oliver Hardy. Like many American films of the time, The Fly Cop was subject to cuts by city and state film censorship boards. The Chicago Board of Censors required cuts in scenes of a man pulling an artificial leg from a girl and of a girl pulling her skirt above her knees while walking across a wet floor.

== Plot ==
The plot follows a bumbling police officer (West) who is assigned to go undercover to gain evidence against a ladies' gambling den and nightclub. To infiltrate the establishment, he disguises himself. Once inside, chaos and slapstick ensue as he causes a series of comedic disturbances, eventually trying to catch the venue's illicit activities in the act.

== Cast ==
- Billy West as The Fly Cop
- Oliver Hardy as Proprietor (credited as Babe Hardy)
- Bud Ross as Handyman (credited as Budd Ross)
- Leo White as The Mayor
- Ellen Burford as Forelady
- Charles Slattery as Chief of Police
- Ethelyn Gibson as A Chicken (credited as Ethlyn Gibson)

== See also ==
- List of American films of 1917
- Oliver Hardy filmography
