= Back Stage (1917 film) =

1917 film

- Directed by: Arvid E. Gillstrom
- Produced by: Louis Burstein
- Starring: Oliver Hardy
- Cinematography: Herman Obrock Jr.
- Edited by: Ben H. Cohen
- Production company: King Bee Studios
- Release date: May 15, 1917
- Country: United States
- Languages: Silent film English intertitles

Back Stage is a 1917 American silent short comedy film featuring Oliver Hardy.

== Cast ==
- Billy West as Props
- Ethel Marie Burton as Ethel (as Ethel Burton)
- Polly Bailey (as Polly Van)
- Joe Cohen
- Ethelyn Gibson (as Ethelynne Gibson)
- Oliver Hardy (as Babe Hardy)
- Florence McLaughlin (as Florence McLoughlin)
- Bud Ross (as Budd Ross)
- Leo White

== Reception ==
Like many American films of the time, Back Stage was subject to cuts by city and state film censorship boards. For example, the Chicago Board of Censors required a cut of closeups of hula dancers and the actions of a bearded man backstage, and the scene of three women falling in the back of the stage and baring their legs. The Kansas Board of Review also required cuts, but did not list the scenes removed due to their "suggestiveness."

== See also ==
- List of American films of 1917
