= The Slave (1917 comedy film) =

1917 film

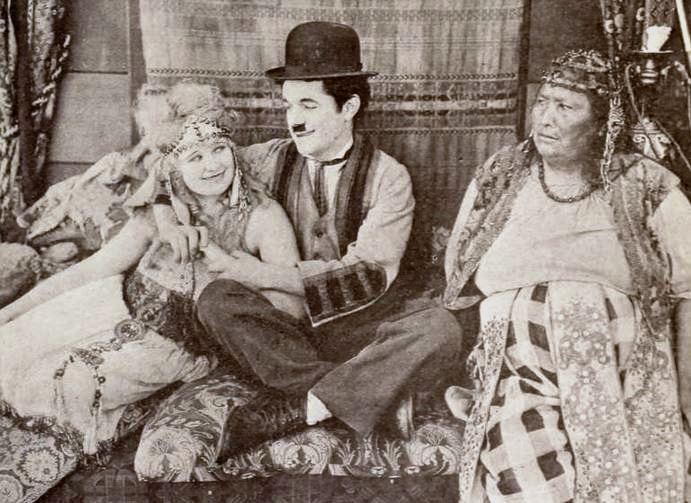
- Image from the film
- Directed by: Arvid E. Gillstrom
- Written by: Rex Taylor (scenario)
- Produced by: Louis Burstein
- Starring: Billy West; Oliver Hardy
- Distributed by: King Bee Studios
- Release date: December 15, 1917
- Running time: 20 minutes
- Country: United States
- Language: Silent

The Slave is a 1917 American 2-reel silent comedy film starring Billy West and featuring Oliver Hardy. It was unusual for a silent film in that, because it told its story so plainly, subtitles or intertitles were not considered necessary. This film is now considered lost.

Plot: Billy is the janitor in a harem.

== Cast ==
- Billy West as Billy, the slave
- Oliver Hardy as The Sultan of Bacteria
- Leo White as The Vizier
- Bud Ross as Haratius Crabbe, the collector (credited as Budd Ross)
- Leatrice Joy as Susie, his daughter
- Gladys Varden as The Sultan's favorite
- Ethel Cassity
- Ellen Burford
- Martha Dean
- Ethelyn Gibson
- Joe Bordeaux

== Reception ==
Like many American films of the time, The Slave was subject to cuts by city and state film censorship boards. For example, the Chicago Board of Censors required, in Reel 1, cuts of the entire incident of man throwing a lobster on a woman's back and all scenes of it on her back, the sultan poking man in back with dagger, and in Reel 2 the last two scenes of pulling the man through window where his trousers come off.

== See also ==
- List of American films of 1917
