= The Millionaire (1917 film) =

1917 film

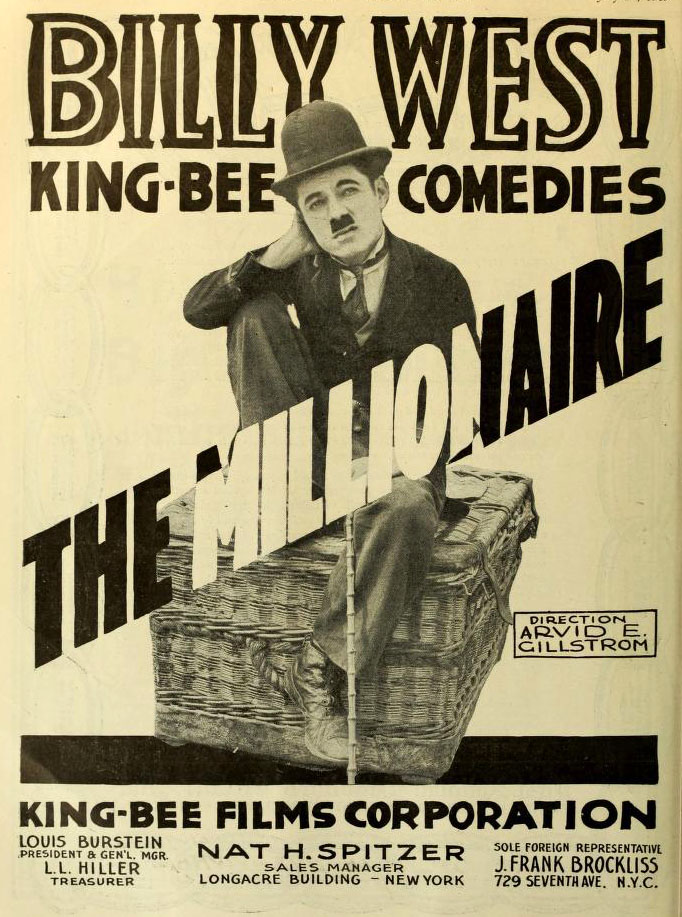
- Advertisement for the film
- Directed by: Arvid E. Gillstrom
- Produced by: Louis Burstein
- Starring: Billy West; Oliver Hardy
- Release date: August 1, 1917
- Running time: 22 minutes
- Country: United States
- Language: Silent with English intertitles

The Millionaire is a 1917 American two-reel silent comedy film featuring Oliver Hardy.

== Plot ==
This plot summary was published in The Moving Picture World for August 4, 1917:

Billy, an eccentric millionaire, is seen walking in the pars by Ethel and. the Count. Getting possession of Billy's handkerchief, they decide to blackmail him. Billy has just received a telegram from his ward, Daisy' notifying him that she is coming to visit him. When Billy's mother-in-law catches him. talking to Ethel in the West home, Billy is panic-stricken, but remembering the telegram, he introduces Ethel as his ward. The mother-in-law is charmed with Ethel and decides to make a match between Ethel and her son Buddy.

Daisy, in the meanwhile, arrives at the West home and Billy brings her to a neighbor's house intending to hide her there until after Ethel has gone. The mother-in-law sees Billy in front of the neighbor's house, and rushing out after Billy, gives chase. Daisy is a witness to the chase and disguises herself as a boy in order tha she may clear up the mystery that seems to enshroud West. She gets inside the West home, where she is seen and recognized by Bad Bill, a former pal of Billy's in his younger days out West. Buddy sees Daisy and Bad Bill in an embrace and begins to act like a nance in derision of Bad Bill. West has eluded his mother-in-law and met Daisy and Bad Bill, so when the mother-inlaw returns home she finds Daisy in her boys' attire sitting on West's knees. Horrified at such a sight, she phones to the insane asylum and to West's wife that Billy has gone insane. The asylum guards and Mrs. West hurry to the house where a fight occurs until explanations are in order. Just as West is explaining the situation, Buddy and Ethel enter with the announcement that they have been married. So when Daisy has proven her identity to the mother-in-law's satisfaction, Billy is received once more into the good graces of his family,

== Cast ==
- Billy West as Billy
- Oliver Hardy as The mother-in-law (as Babe Hardy)
- Ethel Marie Burton as Ethel (as Ethel Burton)
- Joe Cohen
- Florence McLaughlin as (as Florence McLoughlin)
- Polly Bailey (as Polly Van)
- Ethelyn Gibson (as Ethlyn Gibson)
- Leo White
- June Walker
- Bud Ross (as Budd Ross)

== See also ==
- List of American films of 1917
