= Bud Ross =

American actor, comedian, and screenwriter

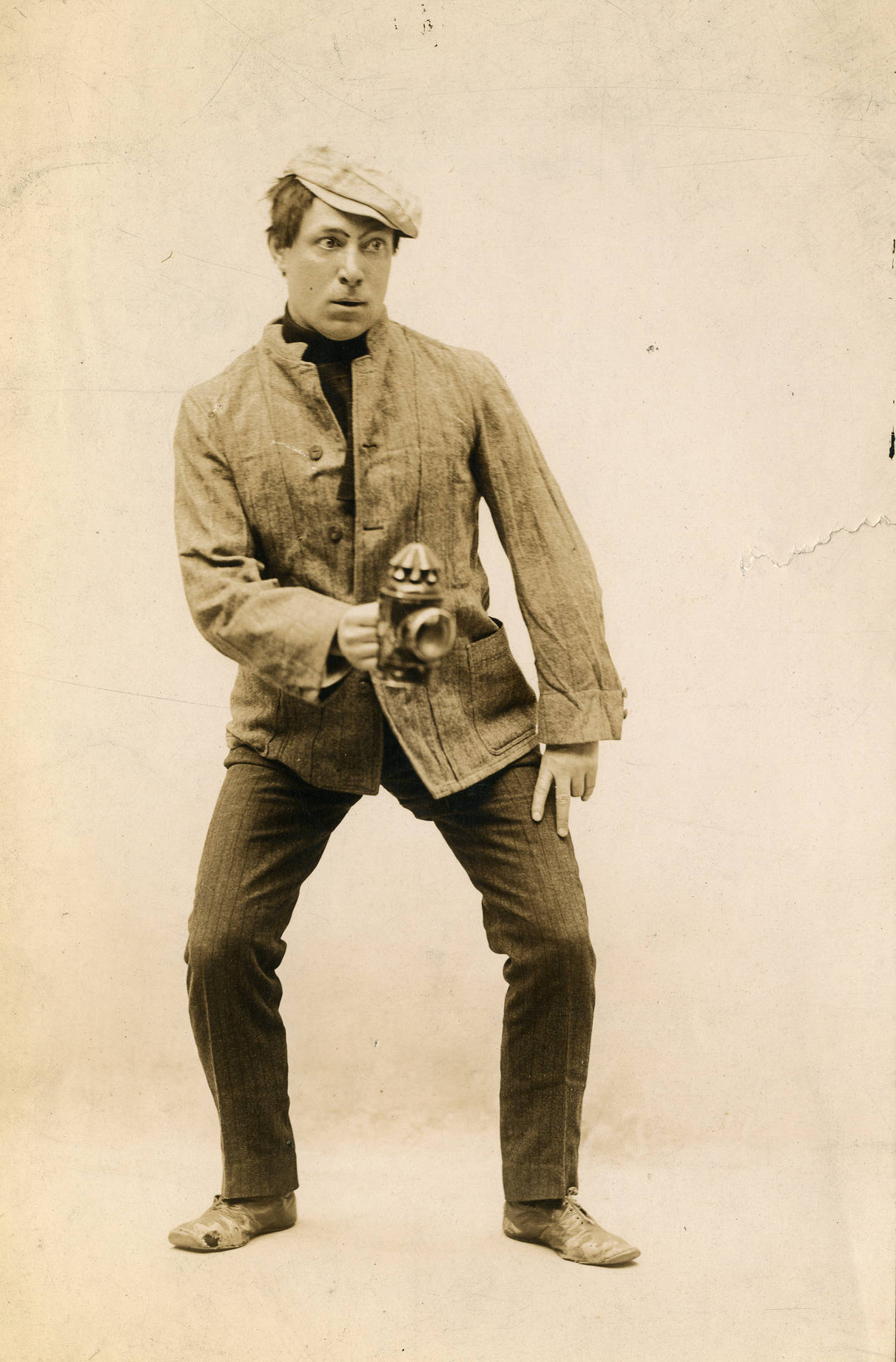
- Ross in 1907
- Born: Aaron Crawford Ross; November 8, 1868; Springfield, Illinois, U.S.
- Died: March 19, 1932 (aged 63); Los Angeles, California, U.S.
- Other name: Budd Ross
- Occupations: Actor; Comedian; Screenwriter

Aaron Crawford "Bud" Ross (November 8, 1868 – March 19, 1932) was an American actor, comedian, and screenwriter.

== Career ==
Ross began his career in the 1880s, performing in musical comedies and vaudeville. In 1900 he starred in the Broadway musical Aunt Hannah at the Bijou Theatre; a work created by composer A. Baldwin Sloane, lyricist Clay M. Greene, and writer Matthew J. Royal.

Ross made his screen debut in the silent film The Burglar's Dilemma (1912) and had supporting roles in W. C. Fields's first two films, Pool Sharks and His Lordship's Dilemma (both 1915). He also supported Cissy Fitzgerald and starred in many comedies himself. At Vim Comedy Company and King-Bee Films starting in 1917, Ross supported a young Oliver Hardy and Chaplin impersonator Billy West in several comedies. Ross and Hardy co-wrote and appeared in the film Tootsies and Tamales (1919). He co-wrote many Peggy comedies in 1925. By the late 1920s, he was mostly playing supporting roles for Sennett, in Raymond McKee's Smith Family comedies and others.

== Filmography ==
- The Burglar's Dilemma (1912)
- A Sprig of Shamrock (1913)
- Ethel's Romeos (1915)
- His Lordship’s Dilemma (1915)
- Alias Mr. Jones (1916)
- The Slave (1917)
- The Candy Kid (1917)
- Wanted – A Bad Man (1917)
- The Fly Cop (1917)
- The Villain
- The Pest
- Bright and Early (1918)
- Tootsies and Tamales (1919)
- Hypnotized
