= The Tramp =

Character played by Charlie Chaplin

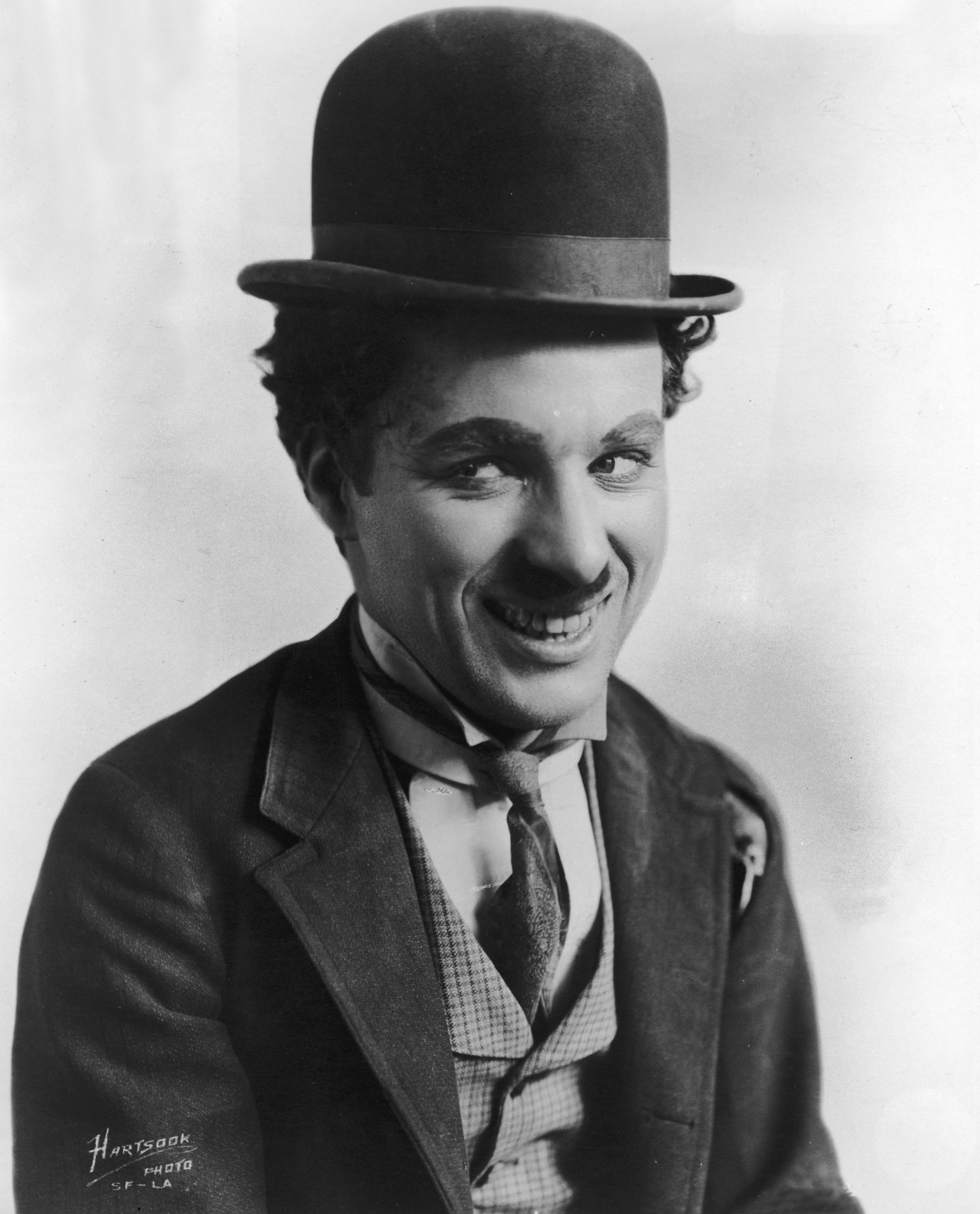
- Chaplin as the Tramp in 1915
- First appearance: Kid Auto Races at Venice (1914)
- Last appearance: The Great Dictator (1940)
- Created by: Charlie Chaplin
- Portrayed by: Charlie Chaplin

In-universe information
- Aliases: The Little Tramp; Charlot; Charlie
- Gender: Male
- Title: The Little Fellow
- Occupation: Tramp
- Children: John (surrogate son)
- Religion: Christianity
- Nationality: British

The Tramp (Charlot in several languages), also known as the Little Tramp, was English actor Charlie Chaplin's most memorable on-screen character and an icon in world cinema during the era of silent film. The Tramp is also the title of a silent film starring Chaplin, which Chaplin wrote and directed in 1915.

The Tramp, as portrayed by Chaplin is a childlike and bumbling but generally good-hearted character who is most famously portrayed as a mischievous vagrant. He endeavours to behave with the manners and dignity of a gentleman despite his actual social status. However, while the Tramp is ready to take what paying work is available, he also uses his cunning self to get what he needs to survive and escape the authority figures who will not tolerate his antics.

Chaplin's films did not always portray the Tramp as a vagrant, however. The character ("the little fellow", as Chaplin called him) was rarely referred to by any names on-screen, although he was sometimes identified as "Charlie" and rarely, as in the original silent version of The Gold Rush, "the little funny tramp".

== History ==
The character of the Tramp was originally created by accident while Chaplin was working at Mack Sennett's Keystone Studios, when dressing up for the 1914 short film Mabel's Strange Predicament starring Mabel Normand and Chaplin. In a 1933 interview, Chaplin explained how he came up with the look of the Tramp:

A hotel set was built for (fellow Keystone comic) Mabel Normand's picture Mabel's Strange Predicament and I was hurriedly told to put on a funny make-up. This time I went to the wardrobe and got a pair of baggy pants, a tight coat, a small derby hat and a large pair of shoes. I wanted the clothes to be a mass of contradictions, knowing pictorially the figure would be vividly outlined on the screen. I wore a small mustache which would not hide my expression. My appearance got an enthusiastic response from everyone, including Mr. Sennett. The clothes seemed to imbue me with the spirit of the character. He actually became a man with a soul—a point of view. I defined to Mr. Sennett the type of person he was. He wears an air of romantic hunger, forever seeking romance, but his feet won't let him.

Mabel's Strange Predicament (1914), the first film produced in which Chaplin plays the Tramp.

That was actually the first film featuring the Tramp but a different film, shot later but with the same character, happened to be released two days earlier. The Tramp debuted to the public in the Keystone comedy Kid Auto Races at Venice (released on 7 February 1914, Mabel's Strange Predicament, shot earlier, was released on 9 February 1914). Chaplin, with his Little Tramp character, quickly became the most popular star in Keystone director Mack Sennett's company of players. Chaplin continued to play the Tramp through dozens of short films and, later, feature-length productions. (In only a handful of other productions did he play characters other than the Tramp.)

The Tramp was closely identified with the silent era, and was considered an international character. The 1931 sound production City Lights featured no dialogue. Chaplin officially retired the character in the film Modern Times (1936), which ended with the Tramp walking down a highway toward the horizon. The film was only a partial talkie and is often called the last silent film. The Tramp remains silent until near the end of the film when, for the first time, his voice is finally heard, albeit only as part of a French/Italian-derived gibberish song.

In The Great Dictator (1940), Chaplin's first film after Modern Times, Chaplin plays the dual role of a Hitler-esque dictator, and a Jewish barber. Although Chaplin emphatically stated that the barber was not the Tramp, he retains the Tramp's moustache, hat, and general appearance. Despite a few silent scenes, including one where the barber is wearing the Tramp's coat and bowler hat and carrying his cane, the barber speaks throughout the film (using Chaplin's own English accent), including a passionate plea for peace that has been widely interpreted as Chaplin speaking as himself.

In 1959, having been editing The Chaplin Revue, Chaplin commented to a reporter regarding the Tramp character, "I was wrong to kill him. There was room for the Little Man in the atomic age."

A vaudeville performer named Lew Bloom created a similar tramp character. Bloom argued he was "the first stage tramp in the business". In an interview with the Daily Herald in 1957, Chaplin recalled being inspired by the tramp characters Weary Willie and Tired Tim, a long-running hobo comic strip from Illustrated Chips that he had read as a boy in London:

The wonderfully vulgar paper for boys [Illustrated Chips] ... and the 'Adventures of Weary Willie and Tired Tim,' two famous tramps with the world against them. There's been a lot said about how I evolved the little tramp character who made my name. Deep, psychological stuff has been written about how I meant him to be a symbol of all the class war, of the love-hate concept, the death-wish and what-all. But if you want the simple Chaplin truth behind the Chaplin legend, I started the little tramp simply to make people laugh and because those other old tramps, Weary Willie and Tired Tim, had always made me laugh.

== Characteristics ==
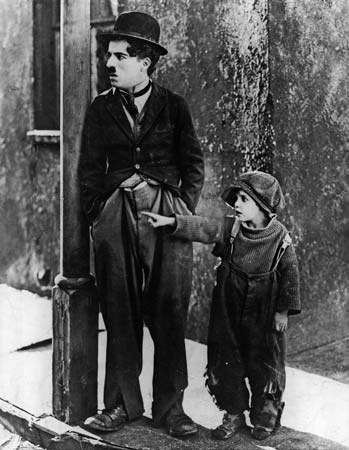
The Tramp and Kid ("John")

The personality of the Tramp in the early Keystone one-reelers is a pleasure-seeking anti-authoritarian and a flirt. The Tramp is also known for his mischievousness. The physical attributes of the Tramp include a pair of large baggy pants, a tight coat, a bowler hat, a large pair of shoes, a springy and flexible cane, and a toothbrush moustache—a mass of contradictions, as Chaplin wanted it to be.

Two films made in 1915, The Tramp and The Bank, created the characteristics of Chaplin's screen persona. While in the end the Tramp manages to shake off his disappointment and resume his carefree ways, the pathos lies in the Tramp's having hope for a more permanent transformation through love and his failure to achieve this.

The Tramp was usually the victim of circumstances and coincidences, but sometimes the results work in his favour. In Modern Times, he picks up a red flag that falls off a truck and starts to wave it at the truck in an attempt to return it, and by doing so, unknowingly and inadvertently becomes the leader of a group of protesting workers, and ends up in jail because of it. While in jail, he accidentally eats "nose powder" (i.e., cocaine), which causes him to not return to his jail cell; but when he eventually does, he fights off some jailbreakers attempting to escape, thus saving the life of the warden. Because of this, the warden offers to let him go, but the Tramp would rather stay in jail because it is better than the outside world.

== Significance ==
Chaplin's social commentary, while critical of the faults and excesses created by industrialisation, also shows support for and belief in the "American Dream." While the Tramp and his fellow workers sweat on the assembly line, the president of the Electro Steel Company works on a puzzle and reads comic strips in the newspaper. The obsession of working with efficiency and assembly-line productivity ultimately drives the Tramp mad. This could be seen as "an attack on the capitalist rationalization of production." However, "the film also guardedly affirms American middle-class, particularly its optimism." For example, one sequence depicts the Tramp's dream in which he and the gamine live a traditional middle-class lifestyle.

The Tramp and the gamine find a rundown shack to live in. The gamine cooks a cheap breakfast, and then the Tramp is off to work, while the gamine stays to maintain the home—an allusion to a middle-class setting. By the ending of Modern Times, "the film seems tailored to please the middle-class optimist." Due to all of their failings the final scene had the gamine stating, "What's the use of trying?," and the Tramp replying "Buck up—never say die." In his silent films, Chaplin uniquely deployed critical social commentary. "What makes Modern Times decidedly different from Chaplin's previous three films are the political references and social realism that keep intruding into Charlie's world." "No comedian before or after him has spent more energy depicting people in their working lives." "Though there had been films depicting the lives of immigrants and urban workers, no filmmaker before Chaplin had created their experience so humanly and lovingly."

The Woman (1915)

Chaplin used not one but two similar-looking characters to the Tramp in The Great Dictator (1940), however, this was an all-talking film (Chaplin's first). The film was inspired by the noted similarity between Chaplin's Tramp, most notably his small moustache and that of Adolf Hitler. Chaplin used this similarity to create a dark version of the Tramp character in parody of the dictator. In his book My Autobiography, Chaplin stated that he was unaware of the Holocaust when he made the film; if he had been, he writes, he would not have been able to make a comedy satirising Hitler. In his autobiography, Chaplin identifies the barber as the Tramp. A noticeable difference is that the barber has a streak of grey in his hair, whereas the Tramp had always been depicted as having dark hair. Also, the barber lacks the ill-fitting clothes of the Tramp and is clearly portrayed as having a profession. His character does share much of the Tramp's character, notably his idealism and anger on seeing unfairness.

== List of films featuring the Tramp ==
=== Keystone ===
Chaplin appeared in 36 films for Keystone Studios, 25 of them featured the Tramp character, all produced by Mack Sennett. Except where noted, all films were one reel in length.

Release date	Title	Credited as	Notes
7 February 1914	Kid Auto Races at Venice	The Tramp	Released on a split-reel (i.e. two films on one reel) with an education film, Olives and Trees.
9 February 1914	Mabel's Strange Predicament	The Tramp	Filmed before but released after Kid Auto Races at Venice, hence it was in this film that the Tramp costume was first used.
28 February 1914	Between Showers	Masher	Chaplin co-leads the film
2 March 1914	A Film Johnnie	The Film Johnnie	
16 March 1914	His Favourite Pastime	Drinker	
4 April 1914	The Star Boarder	The Star boarder	
20 April 1914	Twenty Minutes of Love	Pickpocket	
27 April 1914	Caught in a Cabaret	Waiter	Two reels. Co-writer: Mabel Normand
4 May 1914	Caught in the Rain	Tipsy Hotel Guest	
1 June 1914	The Fatal Mallet	Suitor	
11 June 1914	The Knockout	Referee	Two reels
13 June 1914	Mabel's Busy Day	Tipsy nuisance	
20 June 1914	Mabel's Married Life	Mabel's Husband	Co-writer: Mabel Normand; The Tramp wears a top hat instead of a bowler.
9 July 1914	Laughing Gas	Dentist's Assistant	
1 August 1914	The Property Man	The Property Man	Two reels The Tramp wears no jacket
10 August 1914	The Face on the Bar Room Floor	Artist	Based on the poem by Hugh Antoine d'Arcy.
13 August 1914	Recreation	The Tramp	Released as a split-reel with a travel short, The Yosemite.
27 August 1914	The Masquerader	Film Actor	
31 August 1914	His New Profession	The Tramp	
24 September 1914	The New Janitor	Janitor	
10 October 1914	Those Love Pangs	Masher	
26 October 1914	Dough and Dynamite	Waiter	Two reels. Co-writer: Mack Sennett
29 October 1914	Gentlemen of Nerve	Impecunious Track Enthusiast	
7 November 1914	His Musical Career	Piano Mover	
9 November 1914	His Trysting Place	Husband	Two reels
5 December 1914	Getting Acquainted	Spouse	
7 December 1914	His Prehistoric Past	Weakchin	Two reels

=== Essanay ===
Chaplin wrote, directed, and starred in 15 films for the Essanay Film Manufacturing Company, 13 of them featuring the Tramp character, all produced by Jesse T. Robbins. Except where noted, all films are two-reelers.

Release date	Title	Credited as	Notes
1 February 1915	His New Job	Film Extra	
15 February 1915	A Night Out	Reveller	Debut of Edna Purviance
11 March 1915	The Champion	Aspiring Pugilist	
18 March 1915	In the Park	Charlie	One reel
1 April 1915	A Jitney Elopement	Suitor, the Fake Count	
11 April 1915	The Tramp	The Tramp	
29 April 1915	By the Sea	Stroller	One reel
21 June 1915	Work	Decorator's Apprentice	
12 July 1915	A Woman	Charlie / "The Woman"	
9 August 1915	The Bank	Janitor	
4 October 1915	Shanghaied	Charlie	
27 May 1916	Police	Ex-Convict	
11 August 1918	Triple Trouble	Janitor	Compilation assembled by Leo White with scenes from Police and an unfinished short, Life, along with new material shot by White. Chaplin includes this production in the filmography of his autobiography. Considered by some not to be a proper Tramp film, as Chaplin was not involved in the film's final production. Released two years after Chaplin left Essanay.

=== Mutual ===
Chaplin wrote, produced, directed, and starred in 12 films for the Mutual Film Corporation, ten of which had Chaplin dressed as the character, while the remaining two were pseudo-Tramp films where he wore the mustache but dressed in different clothes. Mutual formed Lone Star Studios solely for Chaplin's films. All of the Mutual releases are two reels in length. In 1932, Amadee J. Van Beuren of Van Beuren Studios purchased Chaplin's Mutual comedies for $10,000 each, added music by Gene Rodemich and Winston Sharples and sound effects, and re-released them through RKO Radio Pictures.

Release date	Title	Credited as	Notes
15 May 1916	The Floorwalker	Impecunious Customer	Co-writer: Vincent Bryan; Released prior to Chaplin's last Essanay film.
12 June 1916	The Fireman	Fireman	Co-writer: Vincent Bryan; Chaplin does not wear the Tramp's clothes, but wears oversized clothes and acts similarly to the character.
10 July 1916	The Vagabond	Street Musician	Co-writer: Vincent Bryan
7 August 1916	One A.M.	Drunk	Chaplin does not wear the Tramp's clothes, but wears rich mans clothes and acts similarly to the character.
4 September 1916	The Count	Tailor's Apprentice	
2 October 1916	The Pawnshop	Pawnbroker's Assistant	
13 November 1916	Behind the Screen	Property Man's Assistant	
4 December 1916	The Rink	Waiter and Skating Enthusiast	
22 January 1917	Easy Street	Vagabond recruited to Police Force	
16 April 1917	The Cure	Alcoholic Gentleman at Spa	Considered by some to be the Tramp
17 June 1917	The Immigrant	Immigrant	Added to the National Film Registry in 1998.
22 October 1917	The Adventurer	Escaped Convict	A tuxedo version of the Tramp costume is worn

=== First National ===
Chaplin wrote, produced, directed, and starred in nine films for his own production company between 1918 and 1923. In all but one of them Chaplin dressed as the character, the exception being The Pilgrim. These films were distributed by First National.

Release date	Title	Credited as	Notes
14 April 1918	A Dog's Life	The Tramp	Three reels. Score composed for compilation, The Chaplin Revue
29 September 1918	The Bond	The Tramp	Half-reel. Co stars brother Sydney Chaplin
20 October 1918	Shoulder Arms	Recruit	Three reels. Score composed for compilation, The Chaplin Revue.
15 May 1919	Sunnyside	Farm Handyman	Three reels. Score composed for 1974 re-release.
15 December 1919	A Day's Pleasure	Father	Two reels. First film with Jackie Coogan, future star of The Kid. Score composed for 1973 re-release.
6 February 1921	The Kid	The Tramp	Six reels. Score composed for 1971 re-release. Added to the National Film Registry in 2011.
25 September 1921	The Idle Class	The Tramp/ Husband	Two reels. Score composed for 1971 re-release.
2 April 1922	Pay Day	Laborer	Two reels. Score composed for 1972 re-release. Chaplin's final short (of less than 30 minutes running time).
26 February 1923	The Pilgrim	Escaped Convict	Considered by many to be a Tramp film, though Chaplin's character is not very much like the Tramp. Most notably, the character wears different clothes. By extension of this, every Chaplin film is considered by some to be a Tramp film, though this is apparently apocryphal. Four reels. Score composed for compilation, The Chaplin Revue.

=== United Artists ===
Chaplin wrote, produced, directed, and/or starred in eight films for United Artists, though only four of them featured the Tramp character, five if The Great Dictator is included. Chaplin also wrote the musical scores, beginning with City Lights.

Release date	Title	Credited as	Notes
26 June 1925	The Gold Rush	Lone Prospector	Score and new narration composed for 1942 re-issue. Added to the National Film Registry in 1992.
6 January 1928	The Circus	The Tramp	Score composed for 1970 re-issue. The Academy Film Archive preserved The Circus in 2002.
30 January 1931	City Lights	The Tramp	Added to the National Film Registry in 1991.
5 February 1936	Modern Times	A factory worker (The Tramp)	Added to the National Film Registry in 1989.

Release date	Title	Credited as	Notes
15 October 1940	The Great Dictator	Adenoid Hynkel / The Barber	Added to the National Film Registry in 1997. Nominated for Academy Award for Best Actor, Best Picture and Best Writing. The film is considered by many, including Chaplin, to not be a Tramp film, though he does act like the Tramp as the Barber.

== Impersonations ==
In the 1910s, due to the desire for more Chaplin films than Chaplin could make, many created their own character like the Tramp or even just played the Tramp. This has continued, though to a much lesser degree, after the 1910s due to people admiring Chaplin. Some films have been animated and obviously do not need an actor to play the character, who is portrayed as mute.

=== Billy West films where he imitates the Tramp (list incomplete) ===
1. His Married Life (1916)
  1. There is a lack of information on this film. It is unknown if Billy is playing the Tramp.
2. Bombs and Boarders (1916)
3. His Waiting Career (1916)
4. Back Stage (1917)
5. The Hero (1917)
6. Dough Nuts (1917)
7. Cupid's Rival (1917)
8. The Villain (1917)
  1. There is a lack of information on this film. It is unknown if Billy is playing the Tramp.
9. The Millionaire (1917)
10. The Goat (1917)
  1. There is a lack of information on this film. It is possible Billy is not playing the Tramp, but due to films released around it having the character, it is unlikely.
11. The Fly Cop (1917)
12. The Chief Cook (1917)
13. The Candy Kid (1917)
14. The Hobo (1917)
15. The Pest (1917)
16. The Band Master (1917)
17. The Slave (1917)
18. Billy the Hotel Guest (1917)
  1. There is a lack of information on this film. It is unknown if Billy is playing the Tramp.
19. The Stranger (1918)
20. Bright and Early (1918)
21. The Rogue (1918)
22. His Day Out (1918)
23. The Orderly (1918)
  1. There's a lack of information on this film. It is possible Billy is not playing the Tramp, but due to films released around it having the character, it is unlikely.
24. The Scholar (1918)
25. The Messenger (1918)
  1. There's a lack of information on this film. It is possible Billy is not playing the Tramp, but due to films released around it having the character, it is unlikely.
26. The Handy Man (1918)
27. The Straight and Narrow (1918)
  1. There's a lack of information on this film. It is possible Billy is not playing the Tramp, but due to films released around it having the character, it is unlikely.
28. Playmates (1918)
29. Beauties in Distress (1918)
  1. There's a lack of information on this film. It is possible Billy is not playing the Tramp, but due to films released around it having the character, it is unlikely.
30. He's in Again (1918)

=== Animated films (incomplete list) ===
1. Charlie and the Windmill (1915)
2. Charlie and the Indians (1915)
3. Dreamy Dud Sees Charlie Chaplin (1915)
4. Charlie's White Elephant (1916)
5. How Charlie Captured the Kaiser (1918)
6. Over the Rhine with Charlie (1918)
7. Charlie in Turkey (1919)
8. Charlie Treats 'Em Rough (1919)
9. Charley Out West (1919)
10. Charley on the Farm (1919)
11. Charley at the Beach (1919)
12. Felix in Hollywood (1923) (cameo)

== Legacy ==
- At the peak of Chaplin's popularity, in 1915, a song was made about him, titled "Those Charlie Chaplin Feet", which describes his funny character, the Tramp.
- The Tramp character of Chaplin, according to Walt Disney, was one of the inspirations for the character of Mickey Mouse, saying "We wanted something appealing, and we thought of a tiny bit of a mouse that would have something of the wistfulness of Chaplin ... a little fellow trying to do the best he could". Ub Iwerks, the artist who helped Disney designing Mickey, said about the character "People accepted him as a symbolic character, and though he looked like a mouse, he was accepted as dashing and heroic."
- Numerous works cite the Tramp as an icon of the Great Depression, of Charlie Chaplin himself, and of the downtrodden hero, from Chaplin's films with similar characters (such as The Great Dictator), to Playboy Penguin, the dapper, silent penguin rescued by Bugs Bunny.
- Gloria Swanson (as Norma Desmond) did a burlesque of The Tramp in Sunset Boulevard. The most famous impersonation is that by Billy West.
- The Tramp made a cameo appearance in the 1974 Rankin/Bass stop motion holiday special The Year Without a Santa Claus.
- In 1978, a year after Chaplin's death, the Peter, Sue, and Marc band took part in the German finals with their song "Charlie Chaplin" as their entry.
- In the 1980s, the character was portrayed in advertising for the IBM PC personal computer.
- The cartoon character "Baggy Pants" presents an imitation of the Tramp.
- From 1973 to 1990, the children's educational television series Sesame Street occasionally featured cast member Sonia Manzano, who played Maria, in character as the Tramp for some skits. Manzano was often accompanied by fellow cast member Linda Bove, who would play a second Tramp or a supporting character, typically a pretty lady.
- Indian filmmaker-actor Raj Kapoor was inspired by Chaplin's "tramp" character, adopting a similar "tramp" persona in a number of his films, such as Awaara (1951) and Shree 420 (1955).
- The Tramp is the main character in the CGI TV series Chaplin & Co. The show places the character in the 21st century and features him meeting up with numerous characters (one of them being a modern version of the Kid) while retaining the humor from Chaplin's original films.
- Homer Simpson dresses up as the Tramp in the opening couch gag in The Simpsons 2002 episode "Jaws Wired Shut"and "The Frying Game".
- The 1995 musical Little Tramp is based on the life of Chaplin and includes the creation of the Tramp.
- In 2003, the AFI's 100 Years...100 Heroes & Villains list ranked the Tramp as the 38th greatest hero.
- Googoosh, Iranian female singer, appeared in the 2004 music video for the song "Otaghe Man" as The Tramp
- In 2006, Premiere issued its list of "The 100 Greatest Performances of all Time", putting Chaplin's performance as the Tramp in City Lights at No. 44.

== Works cited ==
- Maland, Charles (1991), Chaplin and American Culture: The Evolution of a Star Image, Princeton University Press, ISBN 9780691028606
- Kevin Scott Collier. The Chaplin Animated Silent Cartoons. CreateSpace Independent Publishing Platform, 2019. ISBN 1098846044
