= Helen Carruthers =

American actress

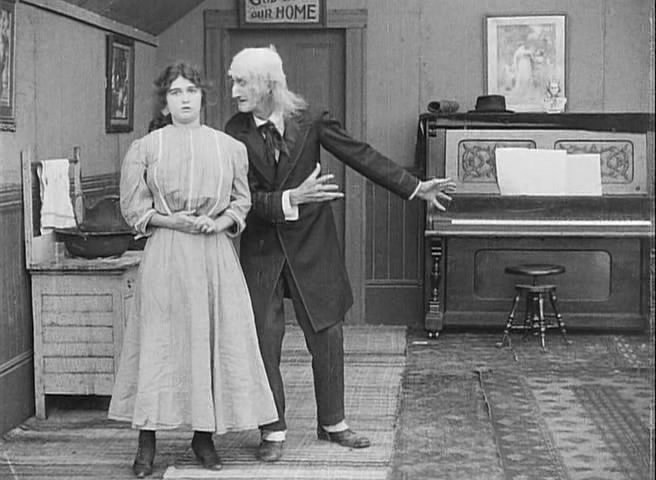
- Helen Carruthers with Frank Hayes in His Musical Career (1914)
- Born: 1892
- Died: 1925 (aged 32–33); New York City

Helen Carruthers (1892–1925) was an American actress of the silent film era. Carruthers is best known for her work in Keystone comedies.

== Career ==
Carruther's career in film began in 1914. That year she appeared in no fewer than 35 Keystone comedies, 17 with Charlie Chaplin. Her screen debut was in the Chaplin comedy His Favourite Pastime, and her last credited work for Keystone was as Chaplin's love interest and the king's wife in His Prehistoric Past. The absence of any credits in Carruther's available filmographies after 1914 suggests that her short motion-picture career ended by 1915.

== Personal life ==
In May 1915, at age 23, Carruthers attempted suicide by swallowing 30 mercury bichloride tablets. She survived, but the poisonous compound severely damaged her kidneys.

Carruthers married Baron Franciscus Gerard Zur Muehlen, a Javanese sugar merchant who was attached to the Dutch diplomatic service, in 1918.

On July 7, 1925, while hosting a gathering in her hotel room at the Ritz Carlton, Carruthers opened a window to let in a breeze, and she fell from the seventh story. The coroner ruled her death an accident.

== Filmography ==
| Year | Film | Role | Notes |
|---|---|---|---|
| 1914 | His Favorite Pastime | Servant | |
| | Caught in the Rain | Chambermaid | Uncredited role |
| | Mabel's Busy Day | Spectator | Uncredited role |
| | Laughing Gas | Pretty patient | Uncredited role |
| | The Property Man | Garlico's Assistant | Uncredited role |
| | Recreation | Girl in park | Uncredited role |
| | The Masquerader | Actress | Uncredited role |
| | His New Profession | Nephew's girlfriend | Uncredited role |
| | The Rounders | Diner | Uncredited role |
| | The New Janitor | Secretary | Uncredited role |
| | Those Love Pangs | Landlady | Uncredited role |
| | Gentlemen of Nerve | Spectator | Uncredited role |
| | His Musical Career | Miss Poor | Uncredited role |
| | His Trysting Place | Clarice | Uncredited role |
| | Tillie's Punctured Romance | Maid and Waitress | Uncredited role |
| | Getting Acquainted | Lover in the park | Uncredited role |
| | His Prehistoric Past | Queen | Arguably one of her more major roles, but still went uncredited |
