= Those Love Pangs =

1914 film by Charlie Chaplin

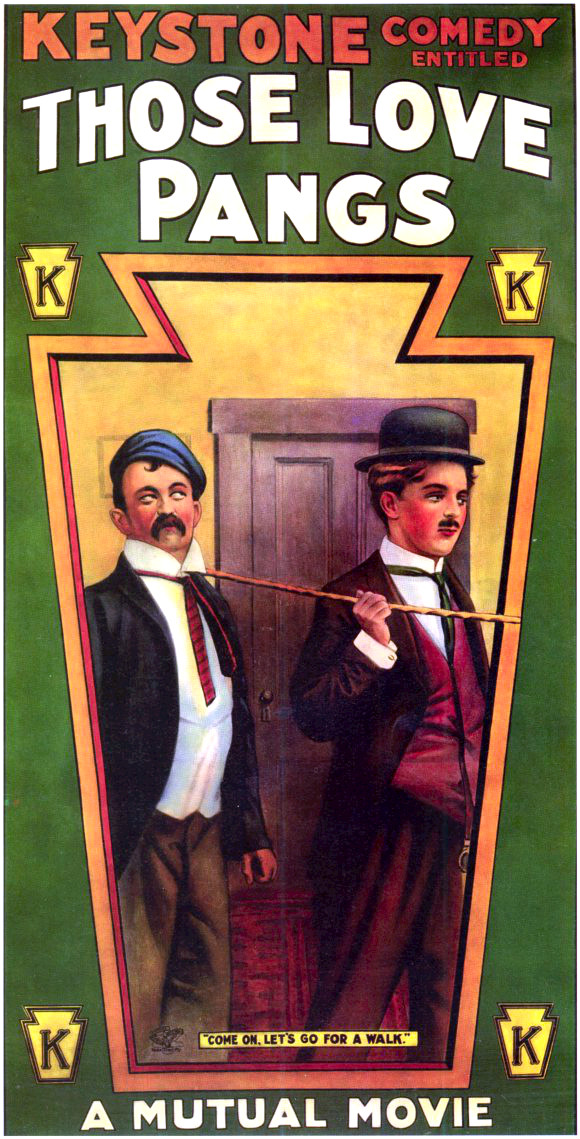
- Theatrical release poster
- Directed by: Charlie Chaplin
- Produced by: Mack Sennett
- Starring: Charlie Chaplin; Chester Conklin; Cecile Arnold; Vivian Edwards
- Cinematography: Frank D. Williams
- Production company: Keystone Studios
- Distributed by: Mutual Film
- Release date: October 10, 1914
- Running time: 12 minutes
- Country: United States
- Languages: Silent; English (Original titles)

Those Love Pangs, also known as The Rival Mashers, is a 1914 American silent comedy film. It was produced by Keystone Studios and starred Charlie Chaplin and Chester Conklin.

Those Love Pangs

== Plot ==
The Tramp fights for the attention of the landlady with the Rival. The Rival makes his attempt first. While he is talking to the Landlady, the Tramp pokes him with a fork from behind a curtain. The Rival gets upset and the landlady becomes annoyed. The Tramp goes on to talk to her. As the Tramp sweet talks the Landlady, the Rival does the same thing the Tramp did to him. The Landlady gets upset and walks away from the Tramp. Upset, the Tramp takes the Rival outside.

They eventually go their separate ways when the Tramp stays outside a bar and the Rival keeps walking toward a park. Before the Tramp goes into the bar, he is distracted by an attractive girl who walks past and glances at him. The Tramp follows her until her tall boyfriend appears. He runs away immediately.

Once at the park the Tramp finds the Rival being kissed by a girl. The girl the Tramp had encountered before ends up at the park as well with her boyfriend. The Tramp becomes jealous of the other two men. He follows the two girls to a theater and sits between them. He finally has the attention of both girls and dozes off. The boyfriend and the Rival come into the theater to find the Tramp with their respective girlfriends, who run away immediately upon seeing their respective boyfriends. When the Tramp finally opens his eyes and realizes what is happening, he falls out of his chair, sending the whole audience into chaos. The film ends with the Tramp getting thrown into the screen.

== Cast ==
- Charlie Chaplin - The Tramp
- Chester Conklin - Rival
- Cecile Arnold - Blonde girl
- Vivian Edwards - Brunette girl
- Helen Carruthers - Landlady

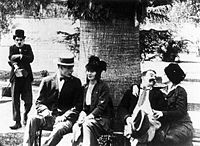
The cast of the film

== Theme ==
Harry A. Grace published the article Charlie Chaplin's Films and American Culture Patterns in the Journal of Aesthetics and Art Criticism in which he analyzes Chaplin's films. He categorizes each of Chaplin's films under a category that corresponds to an era of the United States. According to Grace, seventy-nine percent of the themes in Chaplin's films are about relationships between the sexes. Those Love Pangs was placed under this category. There is some kind of a battle between the two sexes. Chaplin’s character fights for girls with the other gentlemen in the film.

== Reviews ==
A reviewer from Motion Picture World wrote, "Charles Chaplin and Chester Conklin disport themselves in further love affairs in this number."

A reviewer from Bioscope wrote "The volatile Charlie succeeds in making himself agreeable to two ladies at a picture show, but his rivals succeed as usual in reducing him to a state of mental and physical collapse."

== See also ==
- List of American films of 1914
- Charlie Chaplin filmography
- Making a Living

== Bibliography ==
- Neibaur, James L. “Chaplin at Keystone.” Cineaste 36, no. 2 (Spring 2011): 65–67.
