= Edward Nolan (actor) =

American actor

- Born: August 14, 1888
- Died: July 17, 1943 (aged 54)
- Occupation: Actor

Edward Nolan (August 14, 1888 - July 17, 1943), sometimes credited as Eddie Nolan, was an American actor of silent film. He worked for a time as a general manager for the Campbell Comedies.

== Filmography ==
- 1914: Making a Living
- 1914: Between Showers, Chivalrous Policeman
- 1914: Mabel at the Wheel, Spectator (uncredited)
- 1914: The Knockout
- 1914: The Face on the Bar Room Floor, Bartender (as Eddie Nolan)
- 1914: Recreation
- 1914: Gentlemen of Nerve
- 1914: Tillie's Punctured Romance
- 1915: Court House Crooks
