= Continuity (fiction) =

Consistency of a narrative

In fiction, continuity is the consistency of the characteristics of people, plot, objects, and places seen by the audience over some period of time. It is relevant to many genres and forms of storytelling, especially if it is long-running.

Continuity is particularly a concern in the process of film production and television production due to the difficulty in rectifying errors after the filming ends. Continuity can also apply to other art forms, such as novels, comics, and video games, though usually on a smaller scale; it also applies to fiction used by persons, corporations, and governments in the public eye.

Most film and TV productions have a script supervisor on hand whose job is to pay attention to and attempt to maintain continuity across the chaotic and typically non-linear production schedule. It is an inconspicuous job because if done well, none may ever notice. The script supervisor gathers numerous paperwork, photographs, and other documentation which note a large quantity of detail for maintaining the continuity of the production; some of the gathered documents can be sometimes assembled into the story bible. The gathered information and photographs usually records factors both within the scene and the technical details of the production, including meticulous records of camera positioning and equipment settings. Film-based Polaroid cameras were once standard but have since been replaced by digital cameras; all of this is, ideally, so that all related shots can match, even though filming has been split up over months on different sets and locations.

In comic books, continuity has also come to mean a set of contiguous events, sometimes said to be "set in the same universe."

== Continuity errors ==
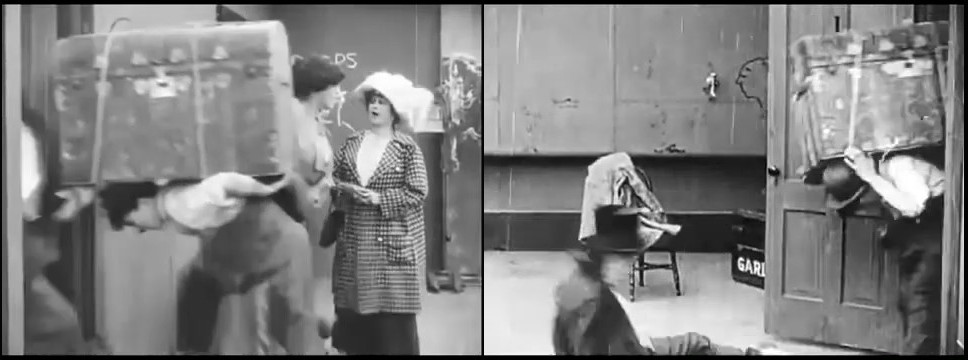
A continuity error in Charlie Chaplin's 1914 comedy short The Property Man. In the first frame, Chaplin's character is seen carrying a trunk through a door, holding his hat behind him. In the immediately subsequent shot from the other side of the door, he is wearing the hat.

Many continuity errors are subtle, such as minor changes between shots (like the level of drink in a glass or the length of a cigarette); these minor errors often remain due to relative indifference to the final cut. While minor errors are often unnoticed by the average viewer, other errors may be more noticeable, such as sudden drastic changes in the appearance of a character. Productions will aim to prevent such errors in continuity because they can affect the audience's suspension of disbelief.

In cinema, special attention must be paid to continuity because scenes are rarely shot in the order in which they appear in the final film. The shooting schedule is often dictated by location permit issues and other logistics. For example, a character may return to Times Square in New York City several times throughout a movie, but as it is extraordinarily expensive to close off Times Square, those scenes will likely be filmed all at once to reduce permit costs. Weather, the ambiance of natural light, cast and crew availability, or any number of other circumstances can also influence a shooting schedule.

=== Measures against continuity errors in the film ===
Film production companies use various techniques to prevent continuity errors. The first would be to film all the shots for a particular scene together and all shots of consecutive scenes together (if the scenes take place together, with no break between them in the film's timeline). This allows actors to remain in costume, in character, and in the same location (and with the same weather, if shooting on location).

The second major technique is for costume designers, production designers, prop masters, and make-up artists to take instant photographs of actors and sets at the beginning and end of each day's shooting (once made possible by Polaroid cameras, now done with digital cameras and cell phones as well). This allows the various workers to check each day's clothing, set, props, and make-up against a previous day's.

The third is to avoid shooting on location entirely but instead film everything on a studio set. This allows weather and lighting to be controlled (as the shooting is indoors), and for all clothing and sets to be stored in one place to be hauled out the next day from a secure location.

The advent of advanced CGI has helped alleviate the challenge of preventing continuity errors from reaching the final cut, as it is easier to "airbrush" the errant drink glass or cigarette than it once was, albeit still not necessarily trivial.

=== Editing errors ===
Editing errors can occur when a character in a scene references a scene or incident that has not occurred yet, or of which they should not yet be aware.

An example of an editing error can be seen in the film It's a Mad, Mad, Mad, Mad World (1963), where a scene of people climbing a slope at the start is seen from below and then replayed from above.

=== Visual errors ===
Visual errors are instant discontinuities occurring in visual media such as film and television. Items of clothing change colors, shadows get longer or shorter, items within a scene change place or disappear, etc.

One of the earliest examples of a visual error appears in Charlie Chaplin's 1914 movie The Property Man. Here, in a supposedly smooth step from one room to another, the Tramp loses his hat in one room, but it is instantly back on his head as he enters the next room. Rather "loose" plots and a lack of continuity editing made most early films rife with such errors.

=== Plot errors ===
A plot error, or a plot hole as it is commonly known, reflects a failure in the consistency of the created fictional world. A character might state he was an only child, yet later mention a sibling. In the TV show Cheers, Frasier Crane's wife Lilith mentions Frasier's parents are both dead, and, in another episode, Frasier himself claims his father to have been a scientist. When the character was spun off into Frasier, his father, a retired policeman named Martin, became a central character. Eventually, in an episode featuring Cheers star Ted Danson, the inconsistency was given the retroactive explanation that Frasier was embarrassed about his father's lowbrow attitudes and thus claimed his death. This is a frequent occurrence in sitcoms, where networks may agree to continue a show, but only if a certain character is emphasized, leading other minor characters to be written out of the show with no further mention of the character's existence, while the emphasized character (usually a breakout character, as in the case of Frasier Crane) develops a more complete back story that ignores previous, more simplified backstories.

=== Homeric nod ===
A Homeric nod (sometimes heard as 'Even Homer nods') is a term for a continuity error that has its origins in Homeric epic. The proverbial phrase for it was coined by the Roman poet Horace in his Ars Poetica: "et idem indignor quandoque bonus dormitat Homerus" ("and yet I also become annoyed whenever the great Homer nods off").

There are numerous continuity errors in Homer that can be described as "nods", as for example:

- In Iliad, Menelaos kills a minor character, Pylaimenes, in combat. Pylaimenes is later still alive to witness the death of his son.
- In Iliad 9.165-93 three characters, Phoinix, Odysseus, and Aias set out on an embassy to Achilleus; however, at line 182 the poet uses a verb in the dual form to indicate that there are only two people going; at lines 185ff. verbs in the plural form are used, indicating more than two; but another dual verb appears at line 192 ("the two of them came forward").

In modern Homeric scholarship, many of Homer's "nods" are explicable as the consequences of the poem being retold and improvised by generations of oral poets. In the second case cited above, it is likely that two different versions are being conflated: one version with an embassy of three people, another with just two people. Alexander Pope was inclined to give Homeric nods the benefit of the doubt, saying in his Essay on Criticism that "Those oft are Stratagems which Errors seem, Nor is it Homer Nods, but We that Dream."

=== Aging discrepancies ===
The practice of accelerating the age of a television character (usually a child or teenager) in conflict with the timeline of a series and/or the real-world progression of time is popularly known as Soap Opera Rapid Aging Syndrome, or SORAS. Children unseen on screen for a time might reappear portrayed by an actor several years older than the original. Usually coinciding with a recast, this rapid aging is typically done to open up the character to a wider range of storylines, and to attract younger viewers. A recent example of this occurring is in the BBC's Merlin series, in which Mordred is initially played by a young child in Season 4, yet suddenly grows up into his late teens in time for the start of Season 5, with the rest of the characters aging by only three years.

The reverse can also happen. On the television program Lost, the character of 10-year-old Walt Lloyd was played by 12-year-old actor Malcolm David Kelley. The first few seasons took place over the course of just a few months, but by that point, Lloyd looked much older than 10. In his remaining few appearances, special effects were used to make him look younger, or the scene took place years later.

=== Deliberate continuity errors ===
Sometimes a work of fiction may deliberately employ continuity errors, usually for comedy. For example, in the Marx Brothers' classic film Duck Soup, at the climax of the film, the camera shows a shot of Groucho Marx speaking a line, followed by a cutaway shot of something else happening, followed by another shot of Groucho. Each time, Groucho's hat changes, usually to something more outrageous than before (a Napoleonic hat, a Prussian hat, etc.). The fictional Broadway play Rogers: The Musical that first appeared in the miniseries Hawkeye (2021) depicts events that happened in the film The Avengers (2012), and contains intentional plot inaccuracies such as the inclusion of Scott Lang / Ant-Man who did not appear in the film.

== Dealing with errors ==
When continuity mistakes have been made, explanations are often proposed by either writers or fans to smooth over discrepancies. Fans sometimes make up explanations for such errors that may or may not be integrated into canon; this has come to be colloquially known as fanwanking (a term originally coined by the author Craig Hinton to describe excessive use of continuity). Often when fans do not agree with one of the events in a story (such as the death of a favorite character), they will choose to ignore the event in question so that their enjoyment of the franchise is not diminished. When the holder of the intellectual property discards all existing continuity and starts from scratch, it is known as rebooting. Fans call a less extreme literary technique that erases one episode the reset button. See also fanon.

A conflict with previously established facts is sometimes deliberate; this is a retcon, as it is a retroactive change in continuity. Retcons sometimes clarify ambiguities or correct perceived errors. This is not to be confused with the continuance of a reality (continuality).

== Ageless characters ==
Some fiction ignores continuity to allow characters to slow or stop the aging process, despite real-world markers like major social or technological changes. In comics this is sometimes referred to as a "floating timeline", where the fiction takes place in a "continuous present". Roz Kaveney suggests that comic books use this technique to satisfy "the commercial need to keep certain characters going forever". This is also due to the fact that the authors have no need to accommodate the aging of their characters, which is also typical of most animated television shows. Kevin Wanner compares the use of a sliding timescale in comics to the way ageless figures in myths are depicted interacting with the contemporary world of the storyteller. When certain stories in comics, especially origin stories, are rewritten, they often retain key events but are updated to a contemporary time, such as with the comic book character Tony Stark, who invents his Iron Man armor in a different war depending on when the story is told.
