= Mabel at the Wheel =

1914 film

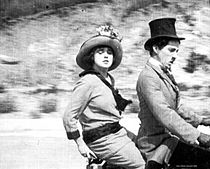
- Normand and Chaplin in a still from the film
- Directed by: Mabel Normand; Mack Sennett
- Written by: Mabel Normand
- Produced by: Mack Sennett
- Starring: Charlie Chaplin; Mabel Normand; Harry McCoy; Chester Conklin; Mack Sennett; Al St. John; Joe Bordeaux; Mack Swain; William Hauber
- Cinematography: Frank D. Williams
- Production company: Keystone Studios
- Distributed by: Mutual Film
- Release date: April 18, 1914
- Running time: 18 minutes
- Country: United States
- Languages: Silent; English (original titles)

Mabel at the Wheel

Mabel at the Wheel is a 1914 American short silent comedy film starring Charlie Chaplin and Mabel Normand, and directed by Mabel Normand and Mack Sennett. The film is also known as Hot Finish.

== Plot ==
Charlie offers Mabel a ride on his two-seater motorcycle, which she accepts in preference to his rival's racing car. Unfortunately, as they go over a bump, she falls off into a puddle. The rival, who has followed in his car, picks up the now stranded Mabel. He lets her drive, sitting tight beside her.

Charlie at last notices she is gone and falls off the bike. He sees them together now stopped and standing beside the car. They leave the car for a short while and Charlie lets down the rear tyre. His rival returns and is furious. They throw rocks at Charlie and he throws them back. The rival's friend appears and gets caught up in the rock-throwing confusion.

We cut to "The Auto Race" where Charlie hovers round the cars. The drivers usher him away when they see he has a sharp pin. Charlie stands puffing heavily on a cigarette. He uses his pin to get through the crowd, where he propositions Mabel and gets slapped. Charlie then whistles and two thugs appear and kidnap his rival just before the race starts. But Mabel decides to don his racing clothes and take the wheel in his place.

As the race progresses, despite a very late start, Mabel, with a co-driver beside her, manages to gain a lead of three laps. Charlie with his henchmen, tries to sabotage the race by using oil and bombs on the track. The oil temporarily spins Mabel's car, no.4, around and it goes backwards for a lap until the oil spins it around again to continue the right way. The car tips over on a bend but a group of men push the heavy 1913 Stutz Bearcat upright again. Meanwhile, the rival escapes his ropes and sees Mabel driving his car. The crowd stand as she crosses the finishing line. The rival and his friend go to congratulate her. Meanwhile, Charlie throws a bomb in the air and blows up both himself and his two thugs.

== Review ==
A reviewer from the New York Dramatic Mirror wrote of the film, "The bright particular star who carries the lead [in Mabel at the Wheel] is Charles Chaplin. Long acquaintance with the speaking stage, and a naturally funny manner of appearing have made him, in the three months' experience that he has had in motion pictures, second to none. Mabel Normand carries the female lead with her usual bright success. This is a Keystone comedy, having said which you proceed to qualify with all the adjectives standing for funny, burlesque, grotesque, farcical or screaming that you can think of, and leave with the fear that you have not done it justice. Yes, there is no sense in it, as usual."

== Cast ==
- Charlie Chaplin - Villain
- Mabel Normand - Mabel
- Harry McCoy - Mabel's boyfriend
- Chester Conklin - Mabel's father
- Mack Sennett - Reporter
- Al St. John - Henchman
- Joe Bordeaux - Dubious character
- Mack Swain - Spectator
- William Hauber - Mabel's co-driver
- Dan Albert - Cheering Spectator (uncredited)
- Charles Avery - Spectator in Grandstand (uncredited)
- Charley Chase - Race Spectator (uncredited)
- Alice Davenport - Spectator in Grandstand (uncredited)
- Minta Durfee - Spectator in Grandstand (uncredited)
- Edgar Kennedy - Spectator in Grandstand (uncredited)
- Charles Lakin - Cheering Spectator (uncredited)
- Grover Ligon - Henchman (uncredited)
- Fred Mace - Dubious character (uncredited)
- Edward Nolan - Spectator (uncredited)
- Fred Wagner - Race Starter (uncredited)

== See also ==
- List of American films of 1914
- Charlie Chaplin filmography
