= Cecile Arnold =

American actress

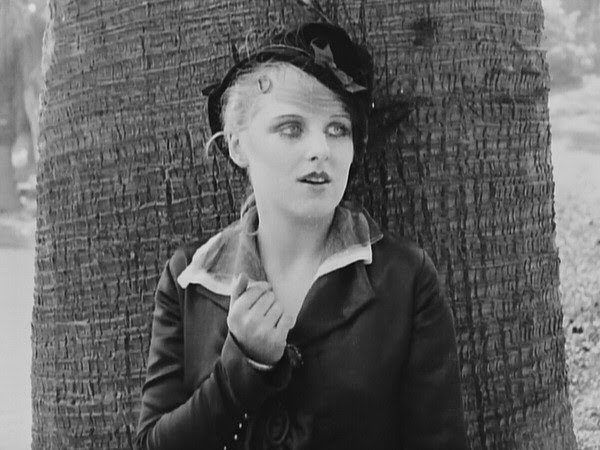
- Arnold in Those Love Pangs, 1914
- Born: Cecile Laval Arnoux; July 9, 1893; Louisville, Kentucky, U.S.
- Died: June 18, 1931 (aged 37); Hong Kong
- Other names: Cecile Arley; Cecile Arnole; Peaches Arnold; Cecele Arno
- Years active: 1913–1917
- Spouse(s): Chauncy Frank Reynolds (m. 1917; div. 1919) David Toeg (divorced)
- Children: 1

Cecile Arnold (born Cecile Laval Arnoux; July 9, 1893 – June 18, 1931) was an American silent film actress.

== Early life ==
Cecile Laval Arnoux was born in Louisville, Kentucky, on July 9, 1893, although some sources indicate 1891, 1897, and 1898.

She had one sibling, a brother, Given Campbell Arnoux (1895–1966).

Her father, Anthony Arnoux (1865–1932), was born in New York City and was a newspaper reporter. Her parents divorced, and Arnold's mother, Susan Campbell (1872–1930), remarried to Albert D. Evans in St. Louis, Missouri in 1902. After having 3 more children there, the family moved to Texas.

== Career ==
Arnold, who was known for playing vamps contracted with Mack Sennett's Keystone Studios in 1913. She appeared in at least fifty films with notable figures such as Charlie Chaplin, Roscoe "Fatty" Arbuckle, Mack Swain and Chaplin's half brother Syd until 1917. Perhaps her most memorable role is as the vamp in The Face on the Bar Room Floor.

Arnold had multiple aliases, one of them being Cecele Arno, which she used when she was in the chorus of the 1916 Al Jolson show Robinson Crusoe, Jr.

== Personal life ==
Arnold married her first husband, Chauncy Frank Reynolds, who was an actor at Keystone, in 1917. They divorced in 1919, and, while on a trip to China with her newspaper reporting brother, met David Toeg, a stock broker from a wealthy Syrian family.

Toeg and Arnold married, and resided in Hong Kong together. According to Brent Walker's book, Mack Sennett's Fun Factory, she left Hong Kong for San Francisco in 1922 so her child could be born in America. She departed from Hong Kong on June 14, 1924, and her son, Robert Raphael Toeg, who was reportedly the result of an affair with Nicolai Nicolaivich Merkuloff (1905–1972), a Russian merchant, was born on March 15, 1925, in San Francisco. Curiously, some sources list Arnold's mother as the mother of Robert.

Toeg and Arnold divorced sometime before June 18, 1931, according to Arnold's death certificate.

== Death ==
Cecile died on June 18, 1931, of acute infective myocarditis. She is buried at Happy Valley Roman Catholic Cemetery in Hong Kong.

== Selected filmography ==
- The Property Man (1914)
- The Face on the Bar Room Floor (1914)
- His New Profession (1914)
- The Rounders (1914)
- He Loved the Ladies (1914)
- Stout Hearts But Weak Knees (1914)
- The Masquerader (1914)
- Those Love Pangs (1914)
- Dough and Dynamite (1914)
- Gentlemen of Nerve (1914)
- Cursed by His Beauty (1914)
- His Musical Career (1914)
- His Talented Wife (1914)
- Fatty's Wine Party (1914)
- His Taking Ways (1914)
- Leading Lizzie Astray (1914)
- His Prehistoric Past (1914)
- Twixt Love and Fire (1914)
- Gussle's Day of Rest (1915)
- Caught in the park (1915)
