= Vivian Edwards =

American actress

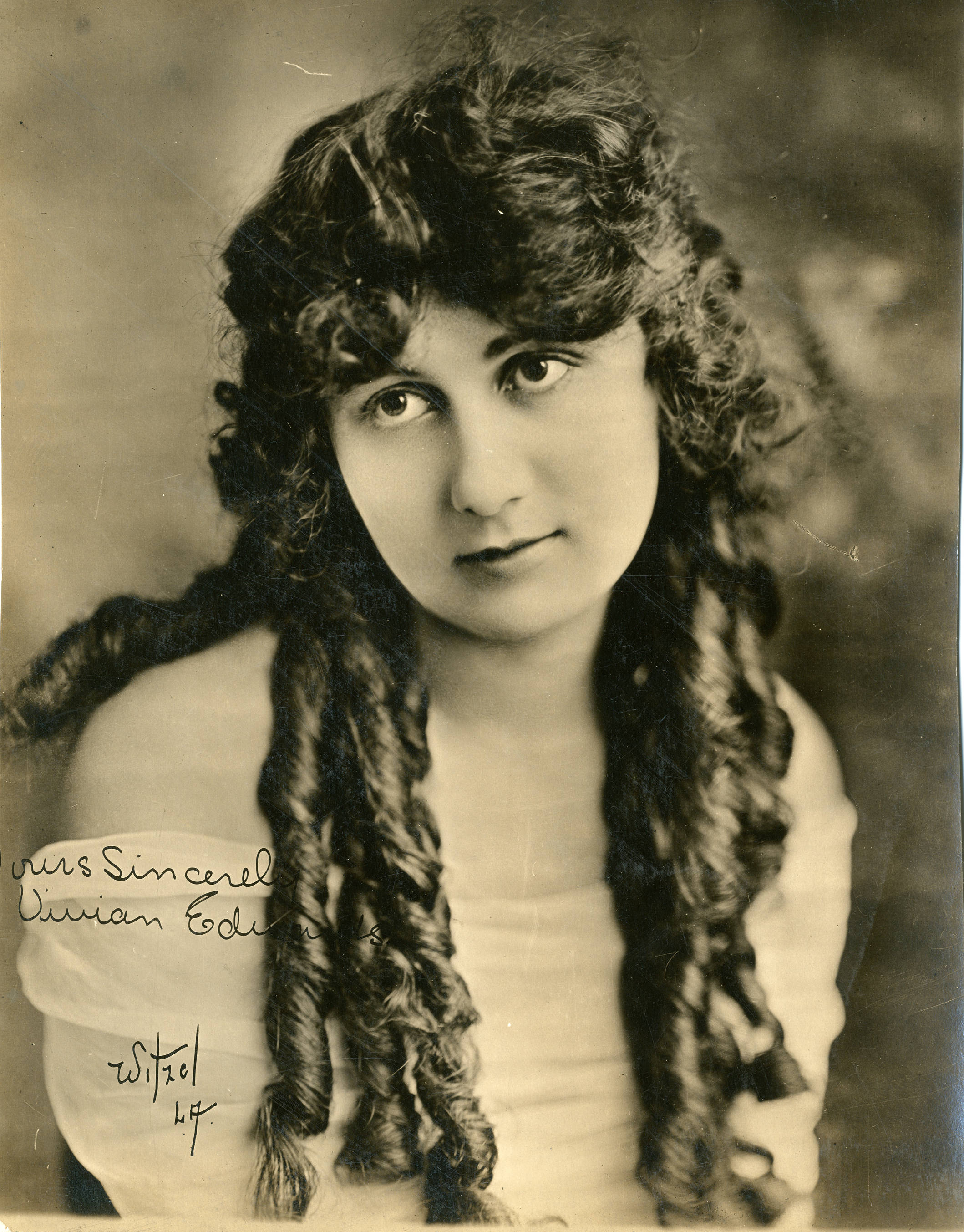
- Born: September 10, 1896; Los Angeles, California, U.S.
- Died: December 4, 1949 (aged 53); Los Angeles, California, U.S.
- Occupation: Actress
- Spouse: Bryan Foy

Vivian Edwards (September 10, 1896 – December 4, 1949) was an American actress of silent film.

== Biography ==
Born in Los Angeles in 1896, Edwards began her film career with the Keystone Film Company. A 1916 magazine article described her as "one of Mack Sennet's most charming fun-makers." She often played in Charlie Chaplin's earliest films in 1914 and 1915. Her role as one of the Goo Goo sisters in The Property Man, starring Chaplin, was one of her most memorable roles. She is credited in 57 silent films. In 1926, she married director Bryan Foy. They had one daughter, Mary Jane (Foy) Landstrom.

== Partial filmography ==
- His Trysting Place (1914)
- The Property Man (1914)
- Those Love Pangs (1914) - Brunette
- The Face on the Bar Room Floor (1914) - Model
- The Masquerader (1914)
- His New Profession (1914)
- Dough and Dynamite (1914) - visitor
- That Little Band of Gold (1915)
- Do-Re-Mi-Boom! (1915) - Girl in hotel lobby
- His Lying Heart (1916)
- A Tuner of Notes (1917)
