= Frank D. Williams (cinematographer) =

American cinematographer

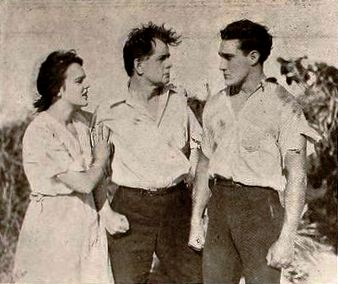
- Still from The Isle of Destiny (1920) with Hazel Hudson, Paul Gilmore, and Frank D. Williams.
- Born: March 21, 1893; Nashville, Missouri, US
- Died: October 16, 1961 (aged 68); Camarillo, California, US
- Resting place: Hollywood Forever Cemetery
- Occupation: Cinematographer
- Years active: 1912–1955
- Known for: Invention of traveling matte shot

Frank D. Williams (March 21, 1893 – October 15, 1961) was a pioneering cinematographer who was active in the early days of the motion picture industry. He developed and patented the traveling matte shot.

== Early life ==
Frank D. Williams was born March 21, 1893, to James and Lucinda Williams in the small community of Nashville, Missouri.

== Career ==
In 1912, Williams became a cameraman at Keystone Studios. There, in 1914, he was the photographer for many of Charlie Chaplin's first-year pictures, including Kid Auto Races at Venice which was the first film released in which The Tramp appeared. (Note: It was not the first time The Tramp was filmed, however; that was in Mabel's Strange Predicament, shot by H.F. Koenekamp, released after Kid Auto Races.) Williams is credited as appearing in Kid Auto Races at Venice, playing a cameraman, but his appearance is in doubt. For a time he was chief cinematographer at Keystone, and a large number of the studio's 1914 films are credited to him as photographer. He defected to work for the short-lived Sterling Motion Pictures, but returned to Keystone when Sterling closed in 1915. He also worked a camera for Henry Lehrman's L-Ko Kompany, Reliance-Majestic Studios, and Bluebird Photoplays.

When Roscoe Arbuckle formed a new motion picture company, Comique, in 1917, he hired Williams to be his cameraman. At Comique, Williams also shot Buster Keaton's first film appearance, The Butcher Boy (1917). His tenure there was also short; he shot three films for Arbuckle (Butcher Boy, A Reckless Romeo, and The Rough House) before departing to start his own lab. His business did not get off the ground quickly, and he supplemented his income by continuing to work as a cameraman. He was director of photography at Sessue Hayakawa's Haworth Pictures Corporation and is credited with 15 pictures that came out of that studio between 1919 and 1921.

While he was working as a cameraman at various studios, Williams worked on his idea for a traveling matte in which the actions of actors would be combined with a filmed moving background. Available technology prevented him from achieving the effect he envisioned until he built a printer himself to his own specification. He filed for a patent in May 1916, and it was granted in July 1918. The process, now known as the "Williams Process", was first used in a motion picture in 1922's Wild Honey.

== Partial filmography ==
- Kid Auto Races at Venice (1914)
- A Film Johnnie (1914)
- Twenty Minutes of Love (1914)
- Caught in the Rain (1914)
- A Busy Day (1914)
- Her Friend the Bandit (1914)
- Mabel's Married Life (1914)
- Laughing Gas
- The Property Man (1914)
- The Face on the Bar Room Floor (1914)
- Recreation (1914)
- The Masquerader (1914)
- His New Profession (1914)
- The New Janitor (1914)
- Those Love Pangs (1914)
- Dough and Dynamite (1914)
- Gentlemen of Nerve (1914)
- His Musical Career (1914)
- His Trysting Place (1914)
- Getting Acquainted (1914)
- His Prehistoric Past (1914)
- Hop, the Devil's Brew (1916)
- His Lying Heart (1916)
- Heart Strategy (1917)
- Mickey (1918)
- Queen of the Sea (1918)
- The Poor Rich Man (1918)
- His Debt (1919)
- The Man Beneath (1919)
- The Gray Horizon (1919)
- The Dragon Painter (1919)
- The Illustrious Prince (1919)
- The Tong Man (1919)
- The Beggar Prince (1920)
- The Brand of Lopez (1920)
- The First Born (1921)
- Black Roses (1921)
- The Swamp (1921)
- Where Lights Are Low (1921)
