= Twixt Love and Fire =

1914 film

- Directed by: George Nichols
- Produced by: Mack Sennett
- Starring: Fatty Arbuckle
- Music by: Ethna Carbery
- Production company: Keystone Studios
- Release date: February 23, 1914
- Country: United States
- Languages: Silent; English intertitles

Twixt Love and Fire is a 1914 American silent short comedy film featuring Fatty Arbuckle.

== Plot ==
According to a film magazine, "A jealous husband tries to lay a trap for his wife. While hiding he sees her embrace her brother, who has returned from abroad, and whom the husband has never met. The wife and brother think him a burglar and lock him up in a room. He throws down a cigarette, which sets the couch on fire and soon the whole room is blazing. He makes frantic efforts to escape, but is held a prisoner until the police and fire department arrive. The firemen turn streams of water onto the fire, and the irate man, and the police take him from the room. Explanations follow."

== Cast ==
- Roscoe "Fatty" Arbuckle
- Peggy Pearce
- Cecile Arnold
- Charles Avery
- Harold Lloyd (unconfirmed)

== See also ==
- List of American films of 1914
- Fatty Arbuckle filmography
- Harold Lloyd filmography
