= He Would a Hunting Go =

1913 film by George Nichols

- Directed by: George Nichols
- Produced by: Mack Sennett
- Starring: Fatty Arbuckle
- Release date: December 29, 1913
- Country: United States
- Languages: Silent; English intertitles

He Would a Hunting Go is a 1913 American short comedy film directed by George Nichols and starring Fatty Arbuckle.

== Cast ==
- Roscoe "Fatty" Arbuckle
- Alice Davenport
- Billy Gilbert (as Little Billy Gilbert)
- Grover Ligon
- Hank Mann
- Harry McCoy
- Al St. John

== See also ==
- Roscoe Arbuckle filmography
- List of American films of 1913
