= His New Profession =

1914 film by Charlie Chaplin

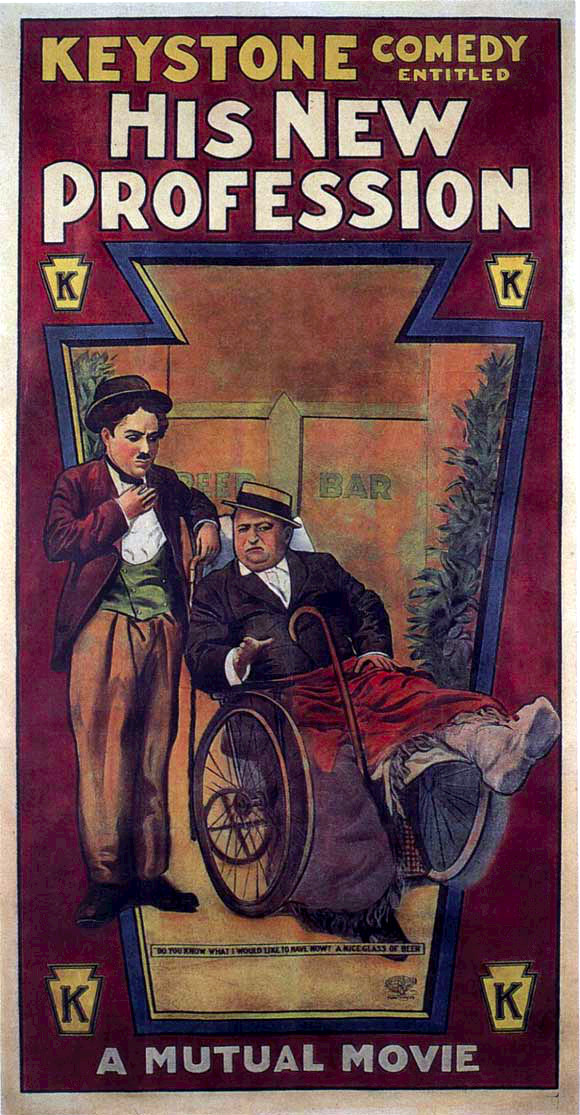
- Theatrical poster
- Directed by: Charlie Chaplin
- Produced by: Mack Sennett
- Starring: Charlie Chaplin; Charley Chase; Cecile Arnold; Harry McCoy; Roscoe Arbuckle; Minta Durfee; Charles Murray; Jess Dandy
- Cinematography: Frank D. Williams
- Edited by: Charlie Chaplin (uncredited)
- Production company: Keystone Studios
- Distributed by: Mutual Film
- Release date: August 31, 1914
- Running time: 16 minutes
- Country: United States
- Languages: Silent; English (Original titles)

His New Profession

His New Profession is a 1914 American silent comedy short film made at the Keystone Studios and starring Charlie Chaplin. The film involves Chaplin taking care of a man in a wheelchair. It is also known as "The Good for Nothing".

== Cast ==
- Charlie Chaplin as The Tramp
- Charley Chase as Nephew
- Cecile Arnold as Woman with eggs
- Harry McCoy as Policeman
- Roscoe Arbuckle as Bartender
- Helen Carruthers as Pretty girl (uncredited)
- Charles Murray as Drinker (uncredited)
- Vivian Edwards as Nurse (uncredited)
- Jess Dandy as Invalid uncle

== Plot ==
The Tramp is hired by a man to wheel his invalid uncle around a seaside park for a while. Although he begins his new job with enthusiasm, the Tramp soon thinks he should be earning extra money for his efforts to spend at a nearby saloon. Accordingly, he takes a beggar's sign and tin and puts them on the wheelchair of the man he is taking care of. As soon as someone puts money into the tin, the Tramp takes the money and spends it at the saloon. The film ends in chaos that involves the Tramp, a pretty girl, the beggar, two park policemen, the old man, and the old man's nephew.

== Reception ==
Motion Picture News commented, "Charlie Chaplin appears in this picture and, as usual, whenever he appears it is a laugh throughout."

== See also ==
- Charlie Chaplin filmography
- List of American films of 1914
