= Kid Auto Races at Venice =

1914 film by Henry Lehrman

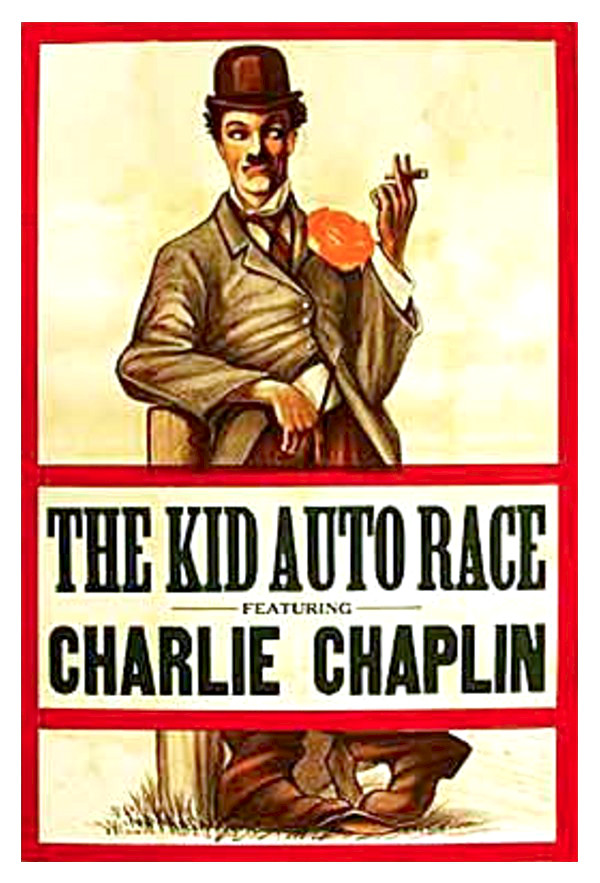
- Theatrical poster for Kid Auto Races at Venice (1914)
- Directed by: Henry Lehrman
- Written by: Henry Lehrman
- Produced by: Mack Sennett
- Starring: Charles Chaplin; Henry Lehrman; Frank D. Williams; Gordon Griffith
- Cinematography: Frank D. Williams; Enrique Juan Vallejo
- Distributed by: Keystone Studios
- Release date: February 7, 1914
- Running time: 6 minutes, 22 seconds
- Country: United States
- Languages: Silent film English (Original titles)

Kid Auto Races at Venice (also known as The Pest) is a 1914 American film starring Charles Chaplin. It is the first film in which his "Little Tramp" character makes an appearance before the public. The first film to be produced that featured the character was actually Mabel's Strange Predicament; it was shot a few days before Kid Auto Races but released two days after it; this film, meanwhile, was released only five days after the first film in which Chaplin appeared, Making a Living. In 2020, Kid Auto Races was selected for preservation in the National Film Registry by the Library of Congress.

== Plot ==
Kid Auto Races at Venice (1914) was Chaplin's second released film.

Made by Keystone Studios and directed by Henry Lehrman, the movie portrays Chaplin as a spectator at a "pushcar" race in Venice, Los Angeles. The film was shot during the Junior Vanderbilt Cup, an actual race with Chaplin and Lehrman improvising gags in front of real-life spectators.

The film is presented at first like a genuine newsreel, with Chaplin's attention-seeking spectator getting in the way of the camera, causing great frustration to the cameraman. Lehrman begins by roughly pushing an obnoxiously persistent Chaplin away, but eventually he starts knocking Chaplin to the ground.

Unusually, the camera breaks the fourth wall to show a second camera filming (as though it were the first) in order to better explain the joke. At this stage, Chaplin gets in the way only of the visible camera on screen, not the actual filming camera. In this way, the filming camera takes on a spectator's viewpoint, and Kid Auto Races becomes one of the first public films to show a movie camera and cameraman in operation.

== Cast ==
- Charlie Chaplin as The Tramp
- Henry Lehrman as Film Director
- Frank D. Williams as Cameraman
- Gordon Griffith as Boy
- Billy Jacobs as Boy
- Charlotte Fitzpatrick as Girl
- Thelma Salter as Girl (Note: Brent Walker (quoted by the BFI) maintains that Chaplin, Lehrman and Williams were the only professional players, the others being members of the public.)

== Reviews ==
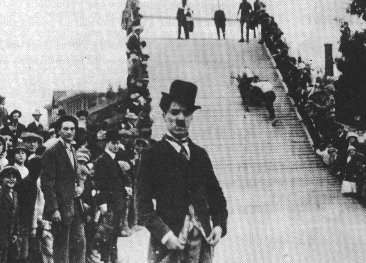
The "Little Tramp" during the film

In the year that the film was released, a reviewer from the silent movie periodical Bioscope wrote, "Some sensational happenings are witnessed during the contests between the baby cars, while the funny man persistently obstructs the eager cameramen in their operations." A reviewer from the silent movie periodical The Cinema noted, "Kid Auto Races struck us as about the funniest film we have ever seen. When we subsequently saw Chaplin in more ambitious efforts, our opinion that the Keystone Company had made the capture of their career was strengthened. Chaplin is a born screen comedian; he does things we have never seen done on the screen before."

== Junior Vanderbilt Cup ==
By 1914, the Vanderbilt Cup had become an important automobile racing event in the United States, and the 1914 event was to be held in Santa Monica, California. The city decided to sponsor a junior version of the event, with several classes, zero-cylinder pushcars, one-cylinder engines, two-cylinder engines, and with age limits for the drivers. Some classes had no engines and used a ramp to accelerate the cars in a manner similar to soap box derby races. Other classes used small engines. Chaplin's movie includes one scene shot at the bottom of the ramp used for the engineless races. There is no evidence that Junior Vanderbilt Cups were held either before or after the 1914 event. Actual silver cups were awarded.

== See also ==
- Charlie Chaplin filmography
