= Harry McCoy =

American actor and screenwriter (1893–1937)

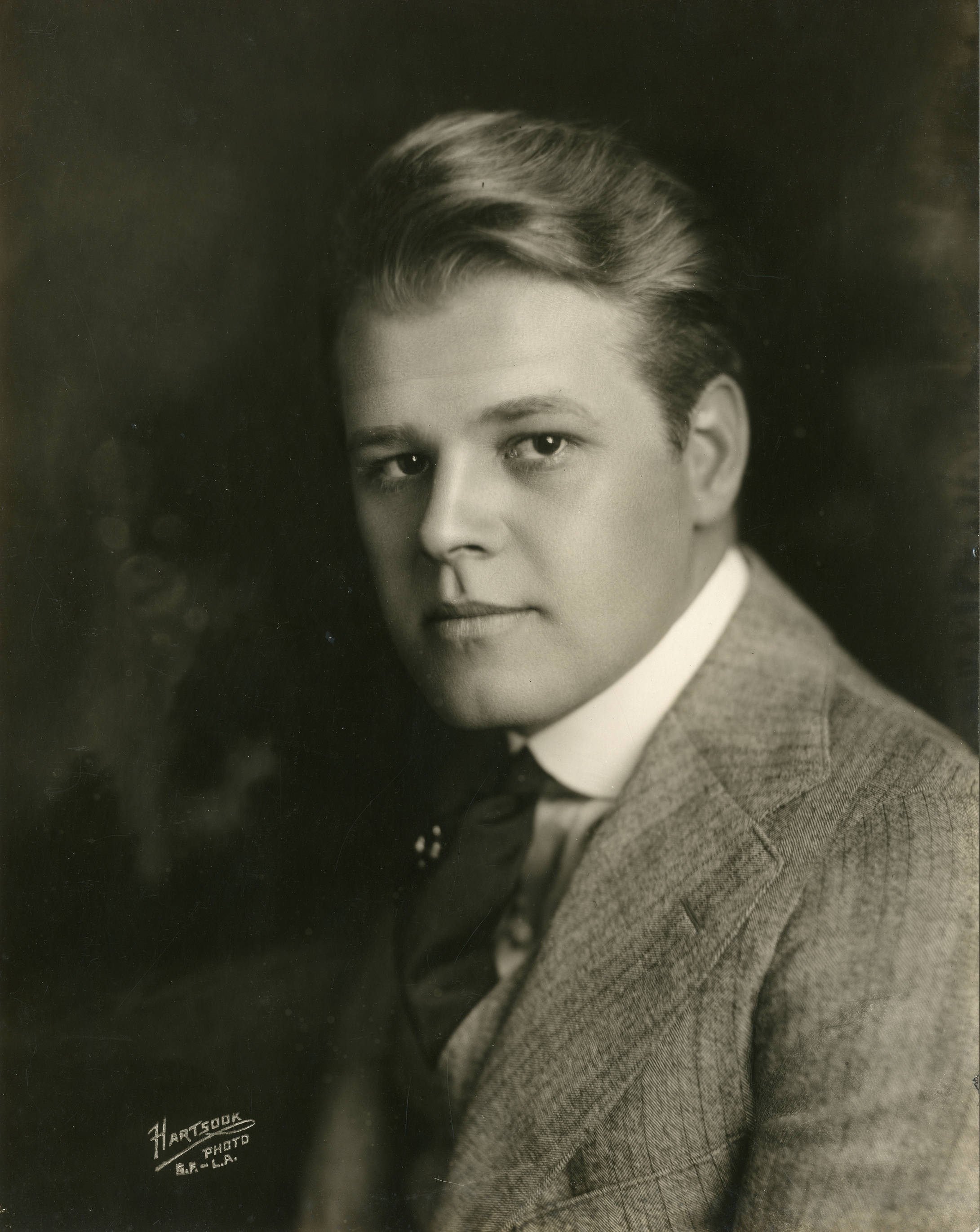
- McCoy in 1919
- Born: December 10, 1893; Philadelphia, Pennsylvania, US
- Died: September 1, 1937 (aged 43); Hollywood, California, US
- Occupation: Actor
- Years active: 1912–1935

Harry McCoy (December 10, 1893 – September 1, 1937) was an American film actor and screenwriter. He appeared in more than 150 films between 1912 and 1935.

== Early years ==
McCoy was born on December 10, 1893, in Philadelphia, Pennsylvania, the firstborn of George Washington McCoy and Alberta Keel. His family moved to California in 1910. He had a sister, Alberta.

== Career ==
McCoy's early experience in entertainment was in vaudeville, where he played a piano and sang.

He joined Universal's Joker Comedy brand in 1912, and the following year teamed with Max Asher to form Mike and Jake for Joker. In 1913, he worked at Universal and Keystone at the same time and was one of the original Keystone Cops. At Triangle Keystone, McCoy directed 15 films. He stayed with the post-Sennett Keystone until August 1917, then made a brief return to vaudeville with the Pantages circuit. In 1920 he played opposite Sid Smith as one of CBC/Federated's "Hall-room Boys" before being replaced by Jimmie Adams.

He appeared in the Stern Bros. Century Comedies distributed by Universal from 1924 to 1925, but he soon became Mack Sennett's writer.

He is credited with co-writing (with Clarence Hennecke and Robert Eddy) the scenario for Harry Langdon’s The Chaser (1928).

He sued Sennett over some music he wrote in 1930, but the dispute apparently was settled before it came to court. In the mid-1930s, he played piano at Frank Kerwin's Merry-Go-Round nightclub.

McCoy joined Disney studio just months before his death.

== Personal life and death ==
McCoy married Frances Josephine Anton in 1923 but the marriage did not go well. After a divorce, he married Mercedes Williams in 1927. He died on September 1, 1937, in Hollywood, California, from a heart attack.

== Selected filmography ==
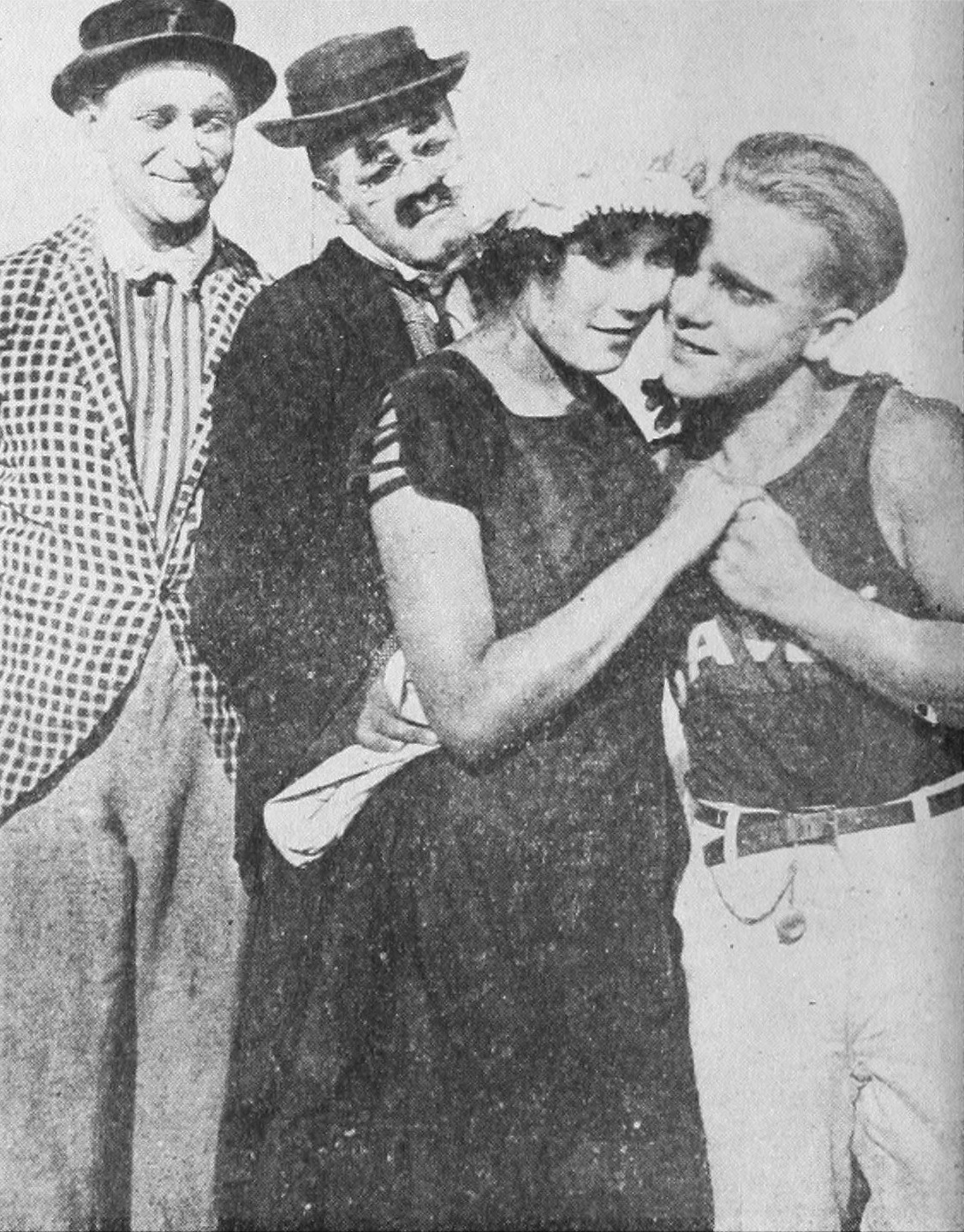
McCoy (second from left) in Mike and Jake at the Beach (1913)

- He Would a Hunting Go (1913)
- Fatty and Minnie He-Haw (1914)
- Fatty's Magic Pants (1914)
- Getting Acquainted (1914)
- His New Profession (1914)
- The Masquerader (1914)
- The Face on the Bar Room Floor (1914)
- The Property Man (1914)
- Mabel's Married Life (1914)
- Mabel's Busy Day (1914)
- Mabel's Blunder (1914)
- Caught in a Cabaret (1914)
- Mabel at the Wheel (1914)
- Mabel's Strange Predicament (1914)
- In the Clutches of the Gang (1914)
- Tillie's Punctured Romance (1914)
- Mabel and Fatty's Wash Day (1915)
- Fatty's Reckless Fling (1915)
- Fatty's Chance Acquaintance (1915)
- That Little Band of Gold (1915)
- A Village Scandal (1915)
- A Tuner of Notes (1917)
- A Hoosier Romance (1918)
- Fair Enough (1918)
- The Garage (1920)
- Skirts (1921)
- The Fatal Mistake (1924)
- Heir-Loons (1925)
- Heads Up (1925)
- Stick Around (1925)
- The Girl from Everywhere (1927)
- Hearts of Men (1928)
- A Little Bit of Fluff (1928)
- Midnight Daddies (1930)
- One More Chance (1931) (writer)
- Won by a Neck (1930)
