= Dough and Dynamite =

1914 film by Charlie Chaplin

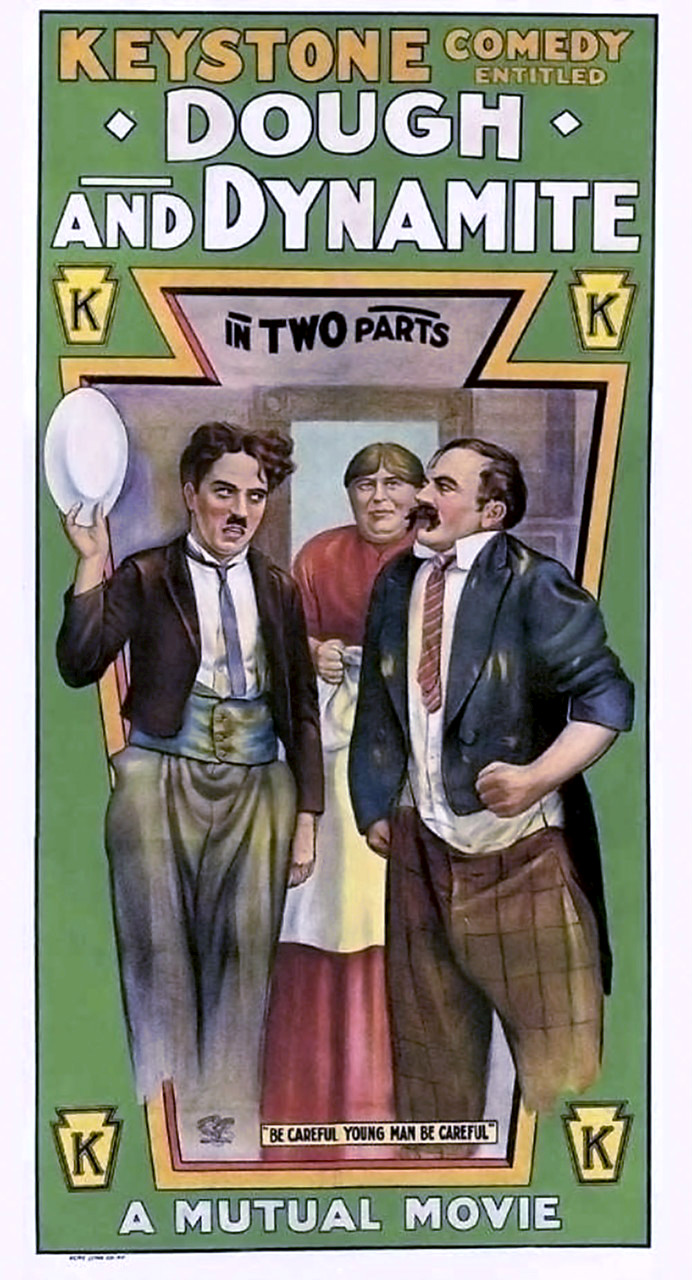
- Theatrical poster
- Directed by: Charlie Chaplin
- Written by: Mack Sennett
- Produced by: Mack Sennett
- Starring: Charlie Chaplin; Chester Conklin; Fritz Schade; Norma Nichols; Cecile Arnold; Vivian Edwards; Phyllis Allen; John Francis Dillon; Edgar Kennedy; Slim Summerville; Charley Chase; Wallace MacDonald; Glen Cavender
- Cinematography: Frank D. Williams
- Edited by: Sydney Chaplin; Charles Chaplin (uncredited)
- Distributed by: Mutual Film Corporation
- Release date: October 26, 1914
- Running time: 33 minutes
- Country: United States
- Languages: Silent; English (Original titles)
- Box office: $130,000

Dough and Dynamite is a 1914 American comedy silent short film made by Keystone Studios starring Charlie Chaplin. Historian Blair Miller considered it a predecessor of Oliver Hardy's Dough Nuts.

Dough and Dynamite

== Plot ==
Two waiters are working at a restaurant. One is especially inept and his comic carelessness enrages the customers. The workers in the restaurant's bakery go on strike for more pay, but are fired by the unsympathetic proprietor. He is then put to work in the bakery where his lack of skills upsets his boss and co-worker, Jacques. Meanwhile, the vengeful strikers have arranged to smuggle a loaf of bread concealing a stick of dynamite into the bakery. During a free-for-all involving them and their boss, the dynamite dramatically explodes and he emerges groggily from a pile of sticky dough.

== Cast ==
- Charlie Chaplin – Waiter
- Chester Conklin – Jacques
- Fritz Schade – Monsieur La Vie, Bakery Owner
- Norma Nichols – Mme. La Vie, the Baker's Wife
- Glen Cavender – Head baker
- Cecile Arnold – Waitress
- Vivian Edwards – Customer
- Phyllis Allen – Customer
- John Francis Dillon – Customer
- Edgar Kennedy – Striking baker
- Slim Summerville – Striking baker
- Charley Chase (as Charles Parrott) – Customer
- Wallace MacDonald – Customer
- Jess Dandy – Female Cook
- Ted Edwards – Striking Baker (uncredited)

== Mack Sennett's recollections ==
In Mack Sennett's 1954 autobiography, King of Comedy, he recalled he was absent from Keystone Studios for most of the filming of Dough and Dynamite. Before Sennett left, he put Chaplin and Conklin jointly in charge of creating a new comedy with basically no guidelines. The two comedians began creating a film in which each man was a roominghouse boarder competing against one another in trying to woo the landlady, but they abandoned the idea after a short time. When they saw a "help wanted" sign outside a local bakery, the idea of a slapstick comedy set within a bakery came to both men almost simultaneously. Sennett claimed, however, that it was his idea to have a stick of dynamite concealed in a loaf of bread. Sennett declared Dough and Dynamite to be Chaplin's breakout film with Keystone.

== Reviews ==
The New York Dramatic Mirror praised Chaplin's efforts in Dough and Dynamite, writing, "In a comparatively short time, Charles Chaplin has earned a reputation as a slapstick comedian second to none. His odd little tricks of manner and his refusal to do the most simple things in an ordinary way are essential features of his method, which thus far has defied successful imitation."

Moving Picture World commented, "Two reels of pure nonsense, some of which is very laughable indeed. Chas. Chaplin appears as a waiter in a French restaurant and bakery. He has a terrible time breaking dishes and getting the dough over the floor. The bakers go on strike and at the last the whole place is blown up by dynamite. This is well-pictured and very successful for this form of humor."
