= The Face on the Bar Room Floor (1914 film) =

1914 film by Charlie Chaplin

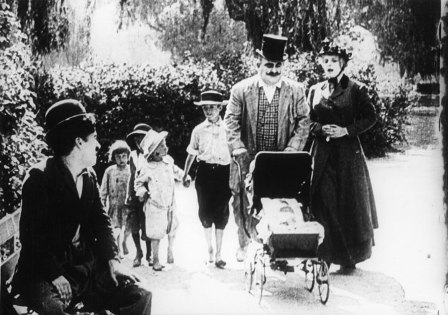
- film scene
- Directed by: Charlie Chaplin
- Based on: The Face on the Barroom Floor by Hugh Antoine d'Arcy
- Produced by: Mack Sennett
- Starring: Charlie Chaplin; Cecile Arnold; Fritz Schade; Vivian Edwards; Chester Conklin; Harry McCoy; Hank Mann; Wallace MacDonald
- Cinematography: Frank D. Williams
- Production company: Keystone Studios
- Distributed by: Mutual Film
- Release date: August 10, 1914
- Running time: 12 minutes
- Country: United States
- Languages: Silent film English (Original intertitles)

The Face on the Bar Room Floor

The Face on the Bar Room Floor is a 1914 short film written and directed by Charlie Chaplin. Chaplin stars in this film, loosely based on the poem of the same name by Hugh Antoine d'Arcy.

== Plot ==
A devastated tramp visits a crowd-filled bar and recounts the story of how he fell in love with a woman and then had her taken by a friend of his. Drunk, he keeps trying to draw the woman's picture on the floor with a piece of chalk, and gets into fights with other men in the process. He eventually passes out “dead drunk” (thus deviating from the poem, where the protagonist actually falls “dead”) at the end of the film.

According to Chaplin expert Gerald D. McDonald, "The subtitles of the film were lines from the poem, but the original verses were altered to match the Keystone credo that life is a funny game at best."

== Cast ==
- Charlie Chaplin - Artist/Tramp
- Cecile Arnold - Madeline
- Fritz Schade - Drinker
- Vivian Edwards - Model
- Chester Conklin - Drinker
- Harry McCoy - Drinker
- Hank Mann - Drinker
- Wallace MacDonald - Drinker
- Edward Nolan - Bartender

== Reception ==
A reviewer for The Moving Picture World gave the film a favorable review, writing "Chas. Chaplain [sic] wins new laurels in the leading part. This is bound to please."

== See also ==
- The Face on the Barroom Floor (poem)
- List of American films of 1914
- Charlie Chaplin filmography
