= A Tuner of Notes =

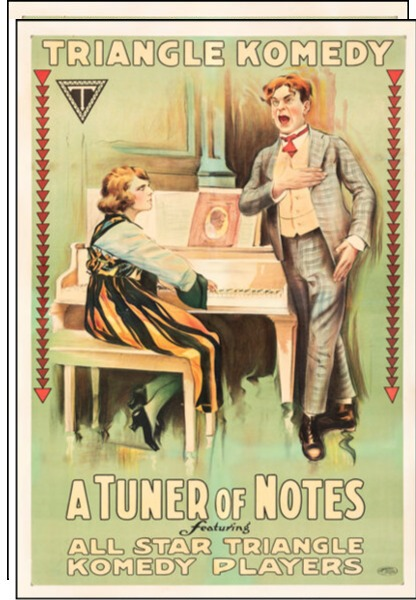
- lobby poster
- Directed by: Harry McCoy
- Produced by: Mack Sennett
- Starring: Harry McCoy
- Cinematography: Charles R. Seeling
- Distributed by: Triangle Film Corporation
- Release date: March 25, 1917
- Running time: 1 reel
- Country: United States
- Languages: Silent; English titles

A Tuner of Notes is a 1917 silent film short comedy directed by and starring Harry McCoy. It was produced by Mack Sennett and distributed by Triangle Film.

== Cast ==
- Harry McCoy
- Miriam Spencer
- Vivian Edwards
- Frank Bond
- Dale Fuller
- Elsie Greeson
- Don Likes
