= Mabel's Busy Day =

1914 film

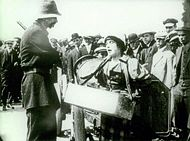
- Mabel Normand in film
- Directed by: Mabel Normand
- Written by: Mabel Normand
- Produced by: Mack Sennett
- Starring: Mabel Normand; Charlie Chaplin; Chester Conklin; Slim Summerville; Billie Bennett; Harry McCoy; Wallace MacDonald; Edgar Kennedy; Al St. John; Charley Chase; Mack Sennett; Henry Lehrman
- Cinematography: Frank D. Williams
- Distributed by: Keystone Studios
- Release date: June 13, 1914
- Running time: 12 minutes, 42 seconds
- Country: United States
- Languages: Silent; English intertitles

Mabel's Busy Day is a 1914 short silent comedy film starring Mabel Normand and Charlie Chaplin; the film was also written and directed by Mabel Normand. The supporting cast includes Chester Conklin, Slim Summerville, Edgar Kennedy, Al St. John, Charley Chase, and Mack Sennett.

Mabel's Busy Day

== Plot ==
Entrepreneur Mabel tries to sell hot dogs at a car race. She bribes a policeman with one of her treats to gain access to the race course but does not do a very good business once she is inside. Meanwhile, Charlie tangles with another police officer but still crashes the gate. He is pursued by the policeman. Mabel sets down her box of hot dogs and leaves them unattended for a moment. Charlie finds the box and freely gives the hot dogs away to hungry spectators at the track. Mabel finds out that Charlie has stolen her box of hot dogs and sends the police after him. Chaos ensues.

== Cast ==
- Mabel Normand - Mabel
- Charlie Chaplin - Tipsy nuisance
- Chester Conklin - Police sergeant
- Slim Summerville - Policeman
- Billie Bennett - Woman
- Harry McCoy - Hotdog thief
- Wallace MacDonald - Spectator
- Edgar Kennedy - Tough hotdog customer
- Al St. John - Policeman
- Charley Chase - Spectator
- Mack Sennett - Customer
- Henry Lehrman - Spectator

== Reviews ==
Motion Picture News commented, "Any comedy with Charles Chaplin and Mabel Normand as the leads is sure to be an immense success. There is no plot at all, but the events that transpire in the one reel are side-splitting."

A reviewer from Bioscope wrote, "The business in question consists of selling sausages on a racecourse, and...it may be imagined that pretty Mabel's business is strenuous and mirth-provoking. The fun never flags, and is well up to the Keystone average."

The review in Motion Picture World stated, "In this comedy, the usual strenuous work of the Keystone artists, headed by Mabel Normand and Charles Chaplin, almost makes the screen on which it is thrown visibly wobble."

== See also ==
- Charlie Chaplin filmography
