= Making a Living =

1914 film by Henry Lehrman

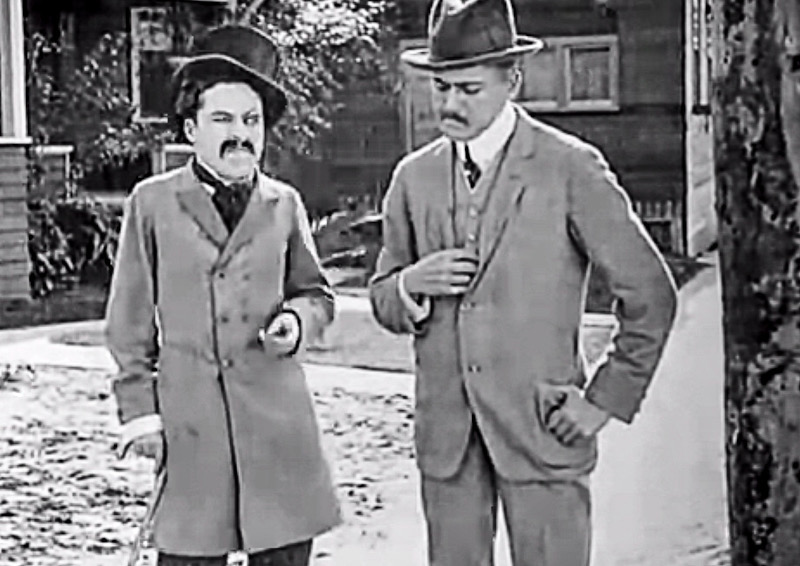
- Charlie Chaplin (left) in scene with Henry Lehrman
- Directed by: Henry Lehrman
- Written by: Reed Heustis; Henry Lehrman
- Produced by: Mack Sennett
- Starring: Charlie Chaplin; Henry Lehrman; Chester Conklin; Minta Durfee; Virginia Kirtley
- Cinematography: Enrique Juan Vallejo; Frank D. Williams
- Production company: Keystone Studios
- Distributed by: Mutual Film Corporation
- Release date: February 2, 1914
- Running time: 12.5 minutes
- Country: United States
- Languages: Silent film English (Original intertitles)

Making a Living (also known as Doing His Best, A Busted Johnny, Troubles, and Take My Picture) is the first film starring Charlie Chaplin. A one-reel comedy short, it was completed in three days at Keystone Studios in Los Angeles, California and was released for distribution on February 2, 1914. In it Chaplin portrays a charming swindler who runs afoul of a news reporter and a Keystone Cop. In addition to co-writing the "scenario" and directing the production, Henry Lehrman performs as the principal supporting character.

== Plot ==
In the film’s opening scene, Chaplin's character, the "Swindler", dressed smartly and wearing a top hat, attempts to convince a passerby to give him money. Reluctantly he gives a dollar coin. The man then goes to a florist to buy a smaller bunch of flowers than he originally intended. Chaplin is next shown flirting with a young woman and proposing marriage to her, giving her a ring, which she accepts. Lehrman, who portrays a news reporter, now approaches the woman and presents to her a bouquet of flowers and a ring, which she refuses to accept, pointing to the new ring. Lerhman sees Chaplin and a slapstick fight between the two immediately ensues. Later, while prowling for a news story, Lehrman's character witnesses and photographs an automobile accident, capturing on film a dramatic image of a car tumbling down a high, steep hill. As he and a crowd of onlookers are trying to help the unfortunate motorist, who is pinned beneath his wrecked car, Chaplin passes by and steals the camera that contains the sensational photograph. He then runs to the local newspaper office with the image and to report the auto accident, claiming them as his own. A short pursuit with the Keystone Cops follows, and then an infuriated Lehrman catches up with Chaplin, and they resume their fistfight on a downtown street. An oncoming streetcar scoops them up on its front cowcatcher and continues down the street and out of frame.

== Cast ==
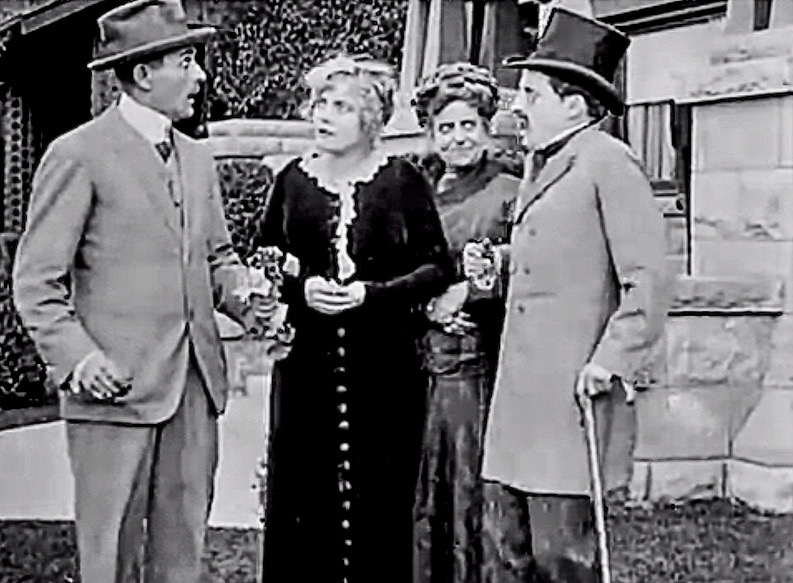
Another scene with (from left) Lehrman, Virginia Kirtley, Alice Davenport, and Chaplin

- Charlie Chaplin as Swindler
- Henry Lehrman as Reporter
- Emma Clifton as jealous husband's wife
- Virginia Kirtley as Daughter
- Alice Davenport as Mother
- Minta Durfee as Woman
- Chester Conklin as Policeman / Bum
- Charles Inslee as Newspaper Editor (uncredited)

== Production ==
Chaplin wears a large moustache and a top hat in the film; he also carries a walking cane. His famous "Little Tramp" screen persona did not appear until his next film, Kid Auto Races at Venice, which was released by Keystone only five days after the studio began distributing Making a Living. In recalling his work with Lehrman in Making a Living, Chaplin maintained that the director had "deliberately" removed the best parts of his performance from the short's final cut. Lehrman, according to Chaplin, was "a vain man", who years later actually "confessed" to misediting the footage because he felt the young Englishman was arrogant and "knew too much".

In his extensive 1985 biography of the comedian, Chaplin: His Life and Art, English film critic and historian David Robinson provides further insight into the short's production, including its filming locations, the evolution of the Chaplin's costume selections for his screen debut, and his acting style in some scenes:

Chaplin’s first film, Making a Living, was one of Keystone’s more elaborate productions. It had a comparatively well-developed story line, and was shot partly on the stage, partly in the gardens of a nearby house, and partly in the street, on Glendale Avenue. Chaplin's costume, make-up and character resembled Archibald Binks in The Wow-Wows and A Night in a London Club, with nothing as yet of the Charlie figure to come. He wore a grey top hat, check waistcoat, stiff collar, spotted cravat and monocle. Most surprising was the long, drooping moustache of a rather dejected stage villain. At the start of the film he established the fraudulence of his elegant pretensions by touching a passing friend (played by Lehrman) for a loan. The first characteristically Chaplin gag is where he disdainfully rejects the proffered coin as too mean, but then hastily grabs it before the friend can change his mind.

Although Lehrman and Reed Heustis are often credited with co-writing the film's scenario, Chaplin in his autobiography offers his view on the screenplay's status when production began. "We had no story", he writes, adding "It was to be a documentary about the printing press done with a few comedy touches." He then states that Lehrman appeared to be "groping for ideas", so as a "newcomer at Keystone" he began to make suggestions. "This", Chaplin continues, "was where I created antagonism with Lehrman."

The footage of street scenes depicts various areas of downtown Los Angeles in 1914. In the scene with the swindler and newspaper reporter fighting in the road, the sign of the Fremont Hotel is shown briefly in the background. That hotel closed in the 1940s, and the entire structure was demolished in 1955.

== Reception ==
The film

In its February 7, 1914, issue, the widely read New York–based trade journal The Moving Picture World gives the comedy short a brief but very positive review:

The clever player who takes the role of nervy and very nifty sharper in this picture is a comedian of the first water, who acts like one of Nature’s own naturals. It is so full of action that it is indescribable, but so much of it is fresh and unexpected fun that a laugh will be going all the time almost. It is foolish-funny stuff that will make even the sober minded laugh, but people out for an evening's good time will howl.

In the months following the film's release, as it circulated across the United States, many city and small-town newspapers, like The Sentinel-Record in Hot Springs, Arkansas, judged the short to be a "laugh", as yet another one of Keystone's "always good and boisterous comedies"; and they encouraged their readers to see it. The local paper in Chickasha, Oklahoma characterized Making a Living as "truly a scream from start to finish", while in Bemidji, Minnesota, the Majestic Theatre promoted it as a "peach", adding "If you never laughed before you will certainly do so if you see this comedy." In those and other remarks about the film in 1914 and in newspaper advertisements promoting the comedy, Charlie Chaplin and his fellow performers are rarely mentioned by name, which at that time was not an uncommon practice outside the realm of film-industry publications, especially with regard to new performers in one-reelers. In June 1914, however, the Dittmann Theatre in Brownsville, Texas, did mention in the town's newspaper that its screening of Making a Living included a "new comedian in the Keystone comedy", an entertainer the theatre identified as "Charles Chappel." Little did that theatre’s management or moviegoers in general know that by the end of the following year, Mr. Chappel would be an established national and international film celebrity and a growing cultural phenomenon.

One scene in particular in Making a Living excited audiences and even prompted film-industry observers in 1914 to comment about Lehrman's and Keystone's willingness to spend considerable amounts of money on their motion-picture projects, even on simple one-reel shorts. The scene is the car accident. The Motion Picture News, another popular New York–based trade publication, reported the financial cost of staging that accident during production:

Henry Lehrman, a Keystone director, tipped a $1,500 ($48,200 today) automobile over a cliff in his last picture, "Making a Living." A nearly new Studebaker was used for this effect and when recovered at the bottom resembled a pile of kindling wood. This expensive episode cost the Keystone Company a good-sized sum, but a thrill was to be gotten out of the story and Keystone took this method of getting it.

== See also ==
- Charlie Chaplin filmography
