= His Prehistoric Past =

1914 film by Charlie Chaplin

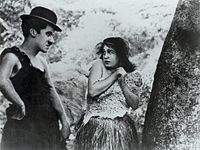
- A scene from the film
- Directed by: Charlie Chaplin
- Written by: Charlie Chaplin
- Produced by: Mack Sennett
- Starring: Charlie Chaplin; Mack Swain; Sydney Chaplin
- Cinematography: Frank D. Williams
- Distributed by: Keystone Studios
- Release date: December 7, 1914
- Running time: 21 minutes, 49 seconds (two reels)
- Country: United States
- Languages: Silent film English

His Prehistoric Past

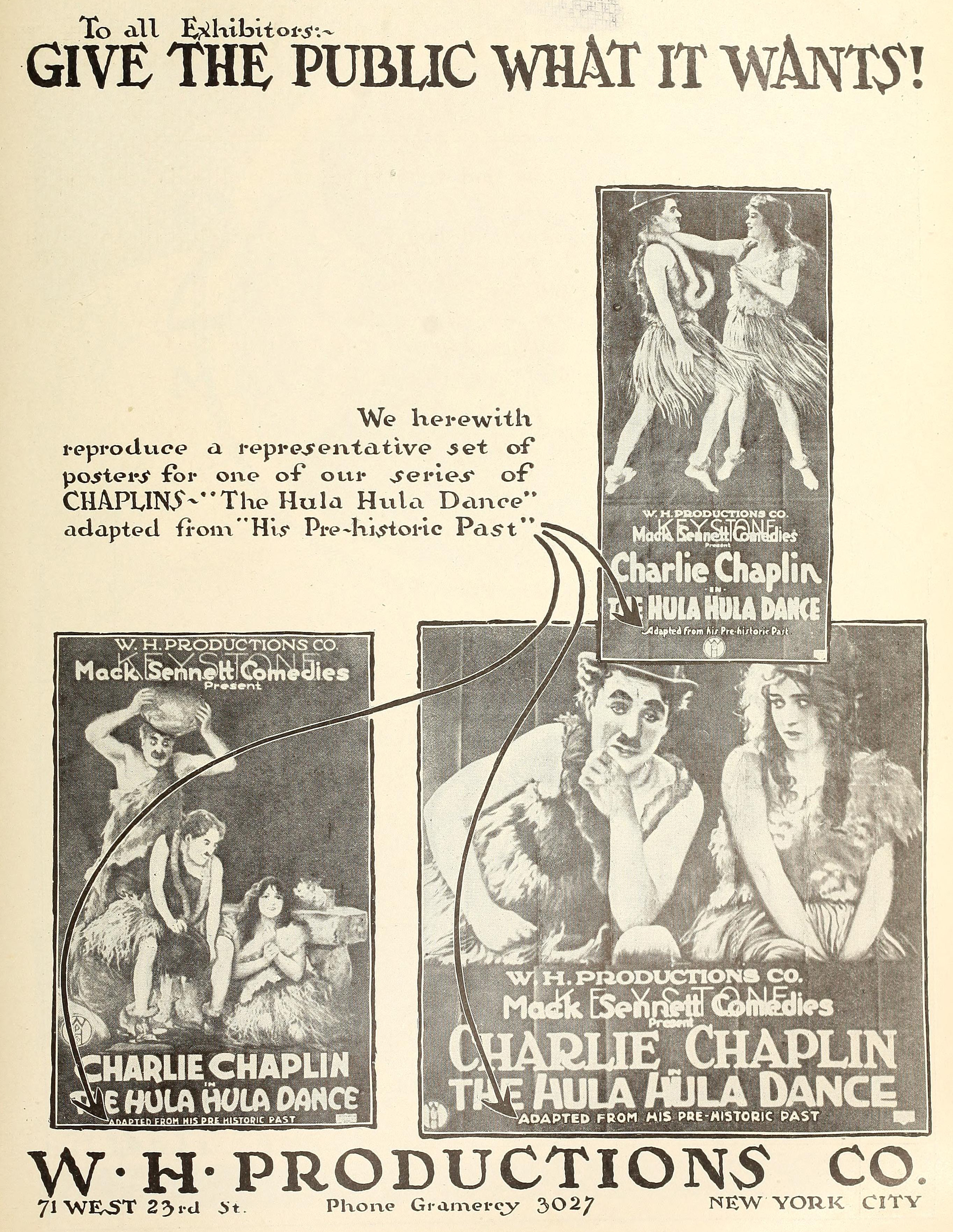
Advertisement (1918)

His Prehistoric Past is a 1914 American short silent comedy film, written and directed by Charlie Chaplin, featuring Chaplin in a stone-age kingdom trying to usurp the crown of King Low-Brow to win the affections of the king's favorite wife. While this film was the final short that was released while Chaplin was at Keystone Studios, the film Getting Acquainted was the last film he made there, and stopped working with almost all of Keystone's regular roster of comedians subsequently. Co-star Mack Swain would not appear in another Chaplin film until 1923 when he had a prominent role in the Chaplin silent film Pay Day.

== Plot ==
The tramp sits on a park bench. He decides to have a nap and lies down and starts to dream.

Back in the Stone Age, King Low-Brow, King of Wakiki Beach, sits surrounded by his six favorite wives as they watch a man dancing to entertain them. A guard stands in the background. All are dressed in animal skins.

Charlie arrives in this land wearing a black hat, caveman-style. He is smoking a pipe and still has his hat and cane. He meets and falls in love with the King's favorite wife. The caveman, who had been dancing, leaves the king and goes hunting. He sees Charlie kissing the arm of the wife and fires an arrow, hitting Charlie in the backside. The wife pulls it out. Charlie throws a rock at the hunter but misses and hits the king on the head. Charlie and the hunter chase each other around a large boulder. The king joins the fracas and is accidentally attacked by the hunter. Charlie then reverses and knocks the hunter out with a club. He exchanges calling cards (leaves) with the King. They shake hands and rub noses. They become friends, and the King takes them to a cave to have a drink.

The wives are admiring Charlie when a younger caveman arrives, and they admire him instead. Charlie clubs him. He picks one wife and goes to the rocky water's edge. A wave drags them out to sea. They make it back, but the King is annoyed.

The clubbed caveman wakes up and seeks revenge. Charlie dances with his favourite wife. The king is annoyed again. They go hunting with a bow and arrow, and Charlie fires at a bird in a nest above, breaking an egg which lands on the king's head. He declares his love for the king's favorite wife. The other wives arrive.

When the King is kicked over a cliff by Charlie, he is presumed dead by the wives, and Charlie declares himself King. However, the king is not dead and is found by the dancing caveman. The king comes back and bashes Charlie over the head with a rock.

Charlie wakes from his dream and a policeman bashes Charlie over the head with his baton because he was sleeping in the park.

== Cast ==
- Charlie Chaplin as Weak-Chin
- Mack Swain as King Low-Brow
- Fritz Schade as Ku-Ku aka Cleo, Medicine Man
- Cecile Arnold as Cavewoman
- Al St. John as Caveman
- Sydney Chaplin as Policeman
- Helen Carruthers as Queen
- Gene Marsh as Sum-Babee, Low-Brow's Favorite Water Maiden

== Reception ==
A reviewer from the San Francisco Call and Post wrote, "Charles Chaplin and other members of the Keystone Company have outdone all their previous fun-provoking efforts in the two-part film called His Prehistoric Past, which puts Chaplin in a dream state during which time he goes through a series of prehistoric difficulties, trying enough to discourage even the strongest 'stone age' man."
