= Recreation (film) =

1914 film by Charlie Chaplin

- Directed by: Charlie Chaplin
- Produced by: Mack Sennett
- Starring: Charlie Chaplin
- Cinematography: Frank D. Williams
- Production company: Keystone Studios
- Distributed by: Mutual Film
- Release date: August 13, 1914
- Running time: 6 minutes
- Country: United States
- Languages: Silent; English (original titles)

Recreation is an American short silent comedy film written, directed by, and starring Charlie Chaplin. It was released on 13 August 1914.

Recreation

Chaplin was the only actor in Recreation to receive a screen credit. The film was only half a reel in length. A travel short, The Yosemite, made up the other half of the reel.

== Plot ==
The Tramp is despondent and prepares to drown himself in a park's lake. He quickly changes his mind when an attractive girl appears, and proceeds to flirt with her. However, her sailor boyfriend discovers this and starts a fight with the Tramp. Shortly thereafter two policemen become involved in the fight. The film ends with everyone falling into the lake.

== Cast ==
- Charlie Chaplin as The Tramp
- Charles Bennett as Sailor (uncredited)
- Helen Carruthers as Girl (uncredited)
- Edwin Frazee as Short cop (uncredited)

== See also ==
- List of American films of 1914
- Charlie Chaplin filmography
