= The Masquerader (1914 film) =

1914 film by Charlie Chaplin

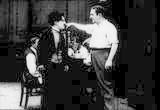
- Directed by: Charlie Chaplin
- Written by: Charlie Chaplin
- Produced by: Mack Sennett
- Starring: Charlie Chaplin; Roscoe "Fatty" Arbuckle; Chester Conklin; Charles Murray
- Cinematography: Frank D. Williams
- Production company: Keystone Studios
- Distributed by: Mutual Film
- Release date: August 27, 1914
- Running time: 13 minutes
- Country: United States
- Languages: Silent; English (Original titles)

The Masquerader

The Masquerader is a 1914 film written and directed by Charlie Chaplin during his time at Keystone Studios. This film stars Chaplin and Roscoe Arbuckle and has a running time of 13 minutes. It is the tenth film directed by Chaplin.

== Plot ==
The film revolves around making films at Keystone Studios. Charlie plays an actor who bungles several scenes and is kicked off the studio. The next day a strange, beautiful woman appears to audition for the film - it's Charlie in disguise. After doing a perfect impersonation of a female, Charlie has drawn the attention of the director who hires the new "actress" for his films. The director gives the beautiful woman the men's dressing room to change in. While there, Charlie returns to his tramp costume. When the director returns looking for the woman, he finds Charlie and realizes he has been tricked. Angry, the director chases Charlie through the studio until Charlie decides to jump into what he thinks is a prop well. The film ends with the director and other actors laughing at Charlie as he is trapped in the bottom of a real well.

== Cast ==
- Charlie Chaplin - Film actor
- Roscoe "Fatty" Arbuckle - Film actor
- Chester Conklin - Film actor
- Charles Murray - Film director
- Jess Dandy - Actor/villain
- Minta Durfee - Leading lady
- Cecile Arnold - Actress
- Vivian Edwards - Actress
- Harry McCoy - Actor
- Charley Chase - Actor
- Frank Opperman - Actor

== Reception ==
A reviewer from Bioscope wrote, "Here we have Mr. Chaplin rehearsing for a cinematograph production, in which he gives a really remarkable female impersonation. The makeup is no less successful than the characterization, and it is further proof of Mr. Chaplin's undoubted versatility."

== See also ==
- List of American films of 1914
- Charlie Chaplin filmography
- Roscoe Arbuckle filmography
