= Chester Conklin =

American actor and comedian (1886–1971)

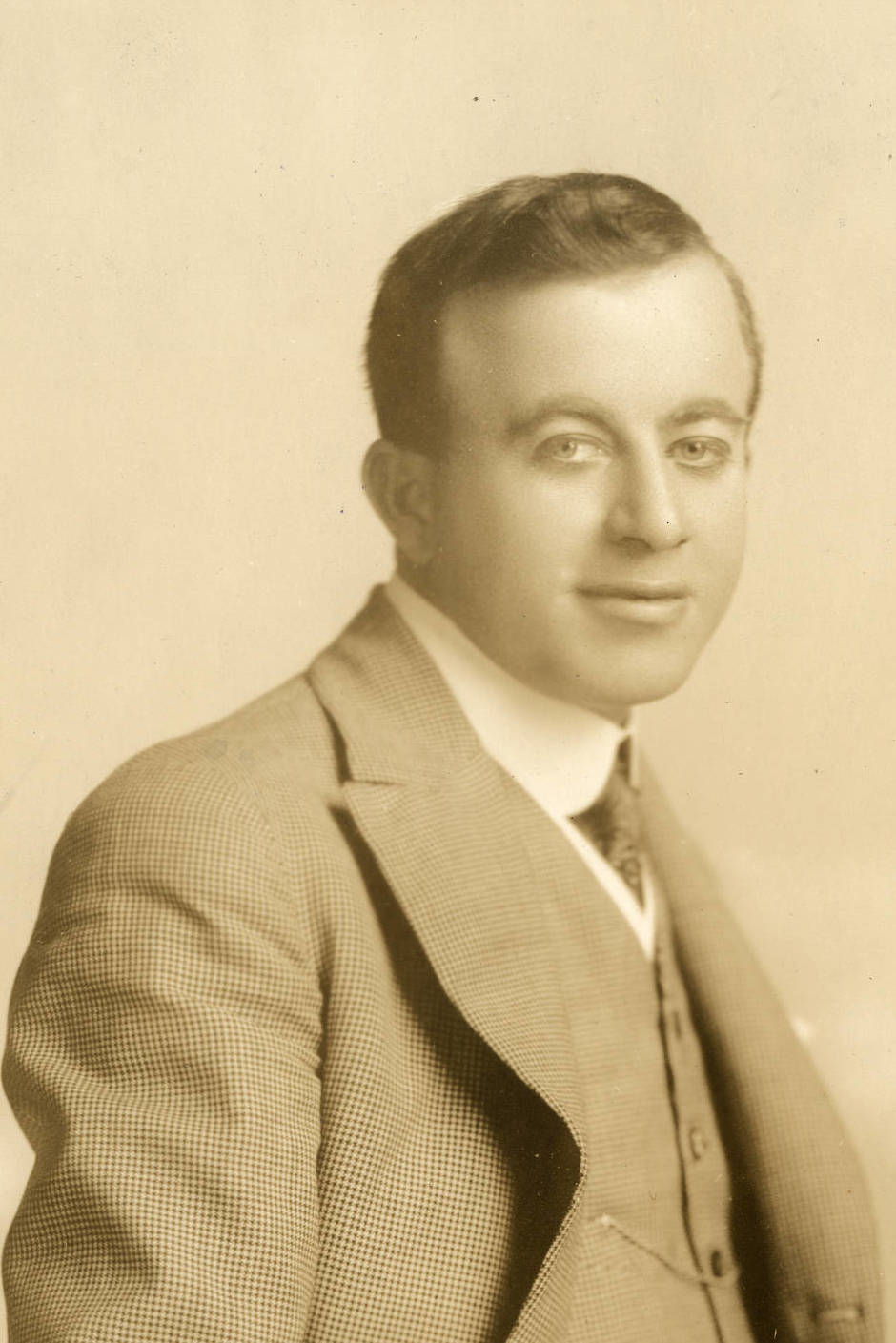
- Conklin in 1919
- Born: Chester Cooper Conklin; January 11, 1886; Oskaloosa, Iowa, U.S.
- Died: October 11, 1971 (aged 85); Van Nuys, California, U.S.
- Occupations: Comedian; actor
- Years active: 1912–1966
- Spouses: Minnie V. Goodwin (m. 1913; div. 1933) Margherita Rouse (m. 1934; died 1937): Valda C. Genessee (m. 1949; ? 19??); Catherine June Ayres Gunther (m. 1965) (died 1974)

Signature
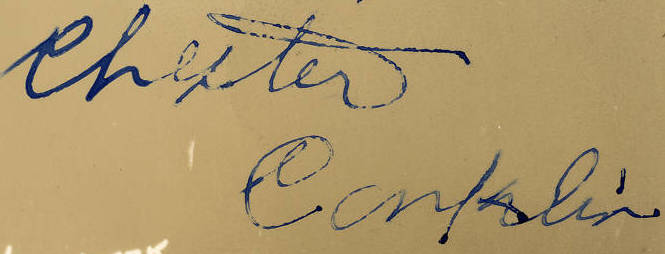

Chester Cooper Conklin (January 11, 1886 – October 11, 1971) was an early American film comedian who started at Keystone Studios as one of Mack Sennett's Keystone Cops, often paired with Mack Swain. He appeared in a series of films with Mabel Normand and worked closely with Charlie Chaplin, both in silent and sound films.

== Early life ==
Conklin was born in Oskaloosa, Iowa. One of three children, he grew up in a violent household. When he was eight, his mother was found burned to death in the family garden. Although first judged a suicide, his father, a devoutly religious man who hoped his son would be a minister, was eventually charged with murder, but found not guilty at trial.

Conklin won first prize when he gave a recitation at a community festival. A few years later, he ran away from home after vowing to a friend he would never return, a promise he kept. Heading to Des Moines he found employment as a hotel bellhop, but then moved to Omaha, Nebraska, where his interest in theatre led to a career in comedic acting. In St. Louis, Missouri, he saw a performance by the vaudeville team of Joe Weber and Lew Fields, which prompted Conklin to develop a character based on his boss at the time, a man with a thick accent and a bushy walrus moustache. With this character, Conklin broke into vaudeville, and spent several years touring with various stock companies, doing vaudeville shows and minstrel shows. He also performed as a clown with the Al G. Barnes Wild Animal Show.

== Career ==
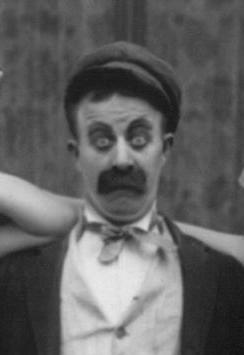
Conklin in 1919

After seeing several Mack Sennett comedies while in Venice, California during the 1913 winter break, the 27-year-old Conklin went to Keystone Studios, applied for a job and was hired as a Keystone Cop with a salary of $3 a day. Sennett directed him in his first film, a comedy short titled Hubby's Job.

In 1914, Conklin co-starred with Mabel Normand in a series of films: Mabel's Strange Predicament, Mabel's New Job, Mabel's Busy Day and Mabel at the Wheel. In that same year he appeared in Making a Living, in which Charlie Chaplin made his film debut. He would go on to make more than a dozen films with Chaplin while at Keystone and the two became lifelong friends. Years later, Conklin would perform with Chaplin in two feature-length films: Modern Times in 1936, and in 1940's The Great Dictator. During this time, Chaplin kept Conklin on year-round salary.

While at Keystone, Conklin became most famous when he was teamed up with the robust comic Mack Swain to make a series of comedies. With Swain as "Ambrose" and Conklin as the grand mustachioed "Walrus", they performed these roles in several films including The Battle of Ambrose and Walrus and Love, Speed and Thrills, both made in 1915. Beyond these "Ambrose & Walrus" comedies, the two appeared together in twenty-six films including some early sound shorts.

In 1920, when Sennett refused to discuss a contract renewal with Conklin and insisted on referring him to an underling, Conklin quit and went to Fox Film Corporation, which had earlier approached him about doing a series of comedy shorts. He also worked at the Famous Players–Lasky Corporation studio. In between, he had a significant role as ZaSu Pitts' father in director Erich von Stroheim's acclaimed 1924 MGM production, Greed, although the part was cut from the film and the footage is now lost, and in 1928 in the Christie Film Company version of Tillie's Punctured Romance with W.C. Fields, which had nothing to do with the 1914 Chaplin version (in which Conklin had also appeared) aside from the title. Paramount Pictures teamed up Conklin and Fields for a series of comic films between 1927 and 1931.

Conklin made the transition to talkies and, although he would continue to act for another thirty years, age and the shift in moviegoing tastes to more sophisticated comedy saw his roles limited to secondary or smaller parts in shorts, including the Three Stooges shorts Flat Foot Stooges (as a fire chief), Dutiful But Dumb (as a bartender), Three Little Twirps (as a Circus butcher), Phony Express (as a bartender), and Micro-Phonies (as a drunken pianist who answers a song request with "Know it? I wrote it!"). Conklin also appeared in films that appealed to nostalgia for the silent era, such as Hollywood Cavalcade (1939) and The Perils of Pauline (1947). In Soundies musicals, he appeared with other silent-comedy alumni as The Keystone Kops, as well as on the televised This Is Your Life tribute to Mack Sennett. Conklin was part of Preston Sturges' unofficial "stock company" of character actors in the 1940s, appearing in cameo parts in six films written by Sturges.

In 1957, he was a guest challenger on the TV panel show To Tell The Truth, dressed in his Keystone Kops uniform.

=== Decline ===
Conklin's career hit bottom in the 1950s, and he took work as a department-store Santa Claus to make ends meet. In the 1960s, Conklin was living at the Motion Picture Country Home and Hospital when he fell in love with another patient there, June Gunther. The two got married in Las Vegas in 1965; his fourth marriage and her third, They set up housekeeping in Van Nuys, California; the groom was seventy-nine and the bride sixty-five. Conklin's final film appearance was in the Western comedy A Big Hand for the Little Lady, released in 1966.

== Personal life ==
On April 12, 1933, Conklin was divorced from Minnie V. Conklin after a marriage of 18 years and nine months. He married Margherita Rouse on May 5, 1934, in Hollywood. She died on May 14, 1937. On June 17, 1965, Conklin married former actress June Gunther in Las Vegas.

Conklin died in California on October 11, 1971, at the age of 85.

== Legacy ==
For his contribution to the motion picture industry, Conklin has a star on the Hollywood Walk of Fame at 1560 Vine Street.

== Selected filmography ==
- Making a Living (1914 short) – Policeman / Bum (film debut, uncredited)
- Mabel's Strange Predicament (1914 short) – Husband
- Mabel at the Wheel (1914 short) – Mabel's Father
- Caught in a Cabaret (1914 short) – Waiter / Footman (uncredited)
- The Masquerader (1914 short) – Film Actor
- Tillie's Punctured Romance (1914) – Mr. Whoozis / Singing Waiter (uncredited)
- A Bird's A Bird (1915 short) – Husband
- The Love Thief (1916) – Minor Role
- Cactus Nell (1917) – ?
- Uncle Tom's Cabin (1918)
- Yankee Doodle in Berlin (1919) – Officer of Death's Head Hussars
- Skirts (1921)
- Tea: With a Kick! (1923) – Jiggs – Taxi Driver
- Desire (1923) – Oland Young
- Anna Christie (1923) – Tommy
- North of Nevada (1924) – Lem Williams
- The Galloping Fish (1924) – Jonah
- The Fire Patrol (1924) – Fireman
- Another Man's Wife (1924) – Rumrunner
- Greed (1924) – 'Popper' Sieppe
- Battling Bunyan (1924) – A Stranger
- One Year to Live (1925) – Froquin
- The Wizard of Oz (1925) – Minor Role (uncredited)
- The Phantom of the Opera (1925) – Orderly (uncredited)
- My Neighbor's Wife (1925) – Cameraman
- Under the Rouge (1925) – Mr. Fleck
- Where Was I? (1925) – Elmer
- The Winding Stair (1925) – Onery
- The Great Jewel Robbery (1925) – Cootie Joe
- The Masked Bride (1925) – Wine Waiter
- A Woman of the World (1925) – Sam Poore
- The Pleasure Buyers (1925) – Burke
- The Great Love (1925) – Perkins
- Behind the Front (1926) – Scottie
- Fascinating Youth (1926) – Himself
- A Social Celebrity (1926) – Johann Haber
- The Wilderness Woman (1926) – 'Kodiak' MacLean
- Say It Again (1926) – Prince Otto V
- The Duchess of Buffalo (1926) – Hotel Manager
- The Nervous Wreck (1926) – Mort
- Midnight Lovers (1926) – Moriarity
- The Lady of the Harem (1926) – Ali
- We're in the Navy Now (1926) – Navy Capt. Smithers
- McFadden's Flats (1927) – Jock McTavish
- A Kiss in a Taxi (1927) – Maraval
- Cabaret (1927) – Jerry Trask
- Rubber Heels (1927) – Tennyson Hawks
- Tell It to Sweeney (1927) – Luke Beamish
- Two Flaming Youths (1927) – Sheriff Ben Holden
- Gentlemen Prefer Blondes (1928) – Judge
- Tillie's Punctured Romance (1928) – Circus Owner
- The Big Noise (1928) – John Sloval
- Fools for Luck (1928) – Samuel Hunter
- Beau Broadway (1928)
- Varsity (1928) – Pop Conlan
- The Haunted House (1928) – Mr. Rackham
- Taxi 13 (1928) – Angus Mactavish
- Marquis Preferred (1929) – Mr. Gruger
- Sunset Pass (1929) – Windy
- House of Horror (1929) – Chester
- The Studio Murder Mystery (1929) – George (Studio Gateman)
- Stairs of Sand (1929) – Tim
- Fast Company (1929) – Chamber of Commerce President
- The Virginian (1929) – Uncle "Pa" Hughey
- The Show of Shows (1929) – Traffic Cop in 'Bicycle Built for Two' Number
- Swing High (1930) – Sheriff
- The Love Trader (1930) – Nelson
- The Master Sweeper (1930)
- Her Majesty, Love (1931) – Emil
- Hallelujah, I'm a Bum (1933) – Sunday
- The Big Broadcast of 1936 (1935) – Sewer Worker (uncredited)
- Modern Times (1936) – Mechanic
- The Preview Murder Mystery (1936) – Comedian
- Call of the Prairie (1936) – Sheriff Sandy McQueen
- Hotel Haywire (1937) – O'Shea (uncredited)
- Forlorn River (1937) – Sheriff Alec Grundy
- Every Day's a Holiday (1937) – Cabby
- Zenobia (1939) – Farmer (uncredited)
- The Spellbinder (1939) – Courtroom Extra (uncredited)
- Hollywood Cavalcade (1939) – Sheriff
- Mr. Smith Goes to Washington (1939) – Man in Press Section of Senate Gallery (uncredited)
- Chip of the Flying U (1939) – Joe (uncredited)
- Henry Goes Arizona (1939) – Bus Driver (uncredited)
- The Great Dictator (1940) – Barber's Customer
- Li'l Abner (1940) – Mayor Gurgle
- Sweetheart of the Campus (1941) – The Prisoner-Vagrant (uncredited)
- Here Comes Mr. Jordan (1941) – Newsboy (uncredited)
- Harmon of Michigan (1941) – Gasoline Chuck
- One Foot in Heaven (1941) – Man Crying During Baptism (uncredited)
- Jesse James at Bay (1941) – Town Drunk (uncredited)
- Sullivan's Travels (1941) – Old Bum (uncredited)
- Honolulu Lu (1941) – Joe – Keystone Kop (uncredited)
- Valley of the Sun (1942) – Soldier at Hitching Rail (uncredited)
- The Remarkable Andrew (1942) – Shopkeeper (uncredited)
- Romance on the Range (1942) – Lynch Mob Member (uncredited)
- In Old California (1942) – Town Drunk (uncredited)
- Sons of the Pioneers (1942) – Old-Timer
- The Palm Beach Story (1942) – Sixth Member Ale and Quail Club
- I Married a Witch (1942) – Party Bartender (uncredited)
- Mrs. Wiggs of the Cabbage Patch (1942) – Drunk (uncredited)
- X Marks the Spot (1942) – Vagrant (uncredited)
- Hangmen Also Die! (1943) – Cook (uncredited)
- Sagebrush Law (1943) – Horse Owner (uncredited)
- The Avenging Rider (1943) – Town Drunk (uncredited)
- Riders of the Rio Grande (1943) – Barfly (uncredited)
- So This Is Washington (1943) – Inventor with Pocket Machine Gun (uncredited)
- Sweet Rosie O'Grady (1943) – Customer at Flugelman's (uncredited)
- My Kingdom for a Cook (1943) – Taxicab Driver (uncredited)
- Around the World (1943) – Waiter (uncredited)
- The Miracle of Morgan's Creek (1943) – Pete (uncredited)
- Knickerbocker Holiday (1944) – Town Trumpeter (uncredited)
- The Adventures of Mark Twain (1944) – Frog-Jumping Contest Judge (uncredited)
- Man from Frisco (1944) – Baggage Man (uncredited)
- Goodnight, Sweetheart (1944) – Bottle Man
- The Yellow Rose of Texas (1944) – Drunken Gambler (uncredited)
- A Fig Leaf for Eve (1944) – Waiter
- The Great Moment (1944) – Frightened Patient (uncredited)
- Hail the Conquering Hero (1944) – Western Union Man (uncredited)
- Something for the Boys (1944) – Minor Role (uncredited)
- Sunday Dinner for a Soldier (1944) – Photographer (uncredited)
- Can't Help Singing (1944) – Poker Player (uncredited)
- Betrayal from the East (1945) – (uncredited)
- A Guy, a Gal and a Pal (1945) – Station Owner (uncredited)
- Brewster's Millions (1945) – Stage Doorman (uncredited)
- Having Wonderful Crime (1945) – Motel Proprietor (uncredited)
- The Great John L. (1945) – Haggerty (uncredited)
- Road to Utopia (1945) – Amateur Contestant Banjo Player (uncredited)
- Little Giant (1946) – Hotel Valet (uncredited)
- Smooth as Silk (1946) – Doorman (uncredited)
- Fear (1946) – Railroad Switchman (uncredited)
- The Hoodlum Saint (1946) – Cop (uncredited)
- Two Sisters from Boston (1946) – Street Cleaner (uncredited)
- She Wrote the Book (1946) – Man at Bar (uncredited)
- Singin' in the Corn (1946) – Austin Driver
- Song of Scheherazade (1947) – Sailor (uncredited)
- Song of the Wasteland (1947) – The Jailer
- The Trouble with Women (1947) – Comedian (uncredited)
- The Perils of Pauline (1947) – Comic Chef
- Springtime in the Sierras (1947) – Old-Timer
- Jesse James Rides Again (1947, Serial) – Roy (uncredited)
- The Son of Rusty (1947) – Bakery Clerk (uncredited)
- Merton of the Movies (1947) – Keystone Kop (uncredited)
- My Wild Irish Rose (1947) – Man Escorted Out of Theatre by Police (uncredited)
- The Wreck of the Hesperus (1948) – Hostler (uncredited)
- Isn't It Romantic? (1948) – Townsman (uncredited)
- One Sunday Afternoon (1948) – Clerk (uncredited)
- Knock on Any Door (1949) – Barber (uncredited)
- Tulsa (1949) – Gambling Casino Patron (uncredited)
- The Beautiful Blonde from Bashful Bend (1949) – Messenger Boy
- Brimstone (1949) – Drunk (uncredited)
- Jiggs and Maggie in Jackpot Jitters (1949) – Jiggs' Friend (uncredited)
- My Friend Irma (1949) – Gypsy Tea Room Waiter (uncredited)
- The Golden Stallion (1949) – Old Man
- The Good Humor Man (1950) – Bush-Cutting Gardener (uncredited)
- Joe Palooka in Humphrey Takes a Chance (1950) – Prentice
- Fancy Pants (1950) – Guest (uncredited)
- Never a Dull Moment (1950) – Albert (uncredited)
- Shakedown (1950) – Chet (uncredited)
- Right Cross (1950) – Haggerty's Waiter (uncredited)
- The Milkman (1950) – Man (uncredited)
- Let's Dance (1950) – Watchman (uncredited)
- My Favorite Spy (1951) – Short Comic (uncredited)
- Son of Paleface (1952) – 2nd Bartender (uncredited)
- Doc Corkle (1952, TV Series)
- Private Hell 36 (1954) – Murdered Man in Elevator (uncredited)
- The Beast with a Million Eyes (1955) – Ben Webber
- Apache Woman (1955) – Dick Mooney
- Rock-A-Bye Baby (1958) – Bit Role (uncredited)
- Paradise Alley (1962) – Mr. Gregory
- A Big Hand for the Little Lady (1966) – Old Man in Saloon (final film)
