= His Musical Career =

1914 film by Charlie Chaplin

- Directed by: Charlie Chaplin
- Starring: Charlie Chaplin
- Release date: November 7, 1914
- Running time: 12 minutes
- Country: United States
- Languages: Silent; English (Original titles)

His Musical Career (also known as Musical Tramp) is a 1914 American comedy silent short film made by Keystone Studios starring Charlie Chaplin.

His Musical Career

== Plot ==
Charlie and his partner Mike work at a piano store, whose manager orders them to deliver a piano to Mr. Rich at 666 Prospect Street and repossess one from Mr. Poor at 999 Prospect Street. Hilarity ensues when they do exactly the opposite after mixing up the addresses of their customers.

== Cast ==
- Charlie Chaplin as Charlie the piano mover
- Mack Swain as Mike
- Charley Chase (as Charles Parrott) as Piano store manager
- Fritz Schade as Mr. Rich
- Cecile Arnold as Mrs. Rich
- Frank Hayes as Mr. Poor

== Review ==
A reviewer from Variety gave it a positive review in November 1914, writing: "One of the best comedies in a month. Funny piano moving skit."

== See also ==
- List of American films of 1914
