= The Property Man =

1914 film by Charlie Chaplin

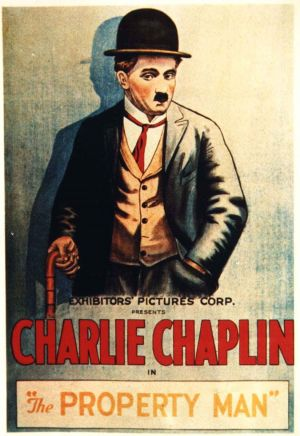
- Theatrical poster
- Directed by: Charlie Chaplin
- Produced by: Mack Sennett
- Starring: Charlie Chaplin; Phyllis Allen; Alice Davenport; Charles Bennett; Mack Sennett; Norma Nichols; Joe Bordeaux; Harry McCoy; Lee Morris
- Cinematography: Frank D. Williams
- Production company: Keystone Studios
- Distributed by: Mutual Film
- Release date: August 1, 1914
- Running time: 31 minutes
- Country: United States
- Languages: Silent; English (original titles)

Video of The Property Man

The Property Man is a short 1914 American comedy silent film made by Keystone Studios starring Charlie Chaplin.

== Plot ==
In the film, Charlie is in charge of stage props at a vaudeville theater. The night's performances are to be:

- The Goo-Goo Sisters: two young women dancing.
- Garlico in “Feets of Strength”: a strong-man aided by his bride.
- "Sorrow": a drama performed by a man and a woman.

The woman from “Sorrow” decides to take the star’s dressing room, which Garlico has claimed by drawing his caricature on the wall. When his bride appears, an argument begins over who gets the room. The dressing-room issue is resolved when Garlico knocks out the man from “Sorrow” and gets the room for himself.

Next, Charlie has to move Garlico’s trunk, but he falls onto the ground due to the heavy weight. When he gets up, he starts chatting happily with the Goo-Goo Sisters. Garlico finds him idling and makes him go back to work.

Charlie makes his old colleague lift the trunk, causing the latter to fall onto the ground with the trunk on top of him. While Charlie is trying to lift it off, Garlico’s bride summons Charlie and they start flirting. Garlico finds out and angrily throws Charlie back onto the old man. Eventually Charlie calls for help in lifting the trunk, which Garlico easily lifts off.

Back in the dressing room, Garlico makes his bride ask Charlie to sew up his tights. Meanwhile, the matinee begins.

During the Goo-Goo Sisters’ performance, the old man and Charlie start fighting, which is interrupted when Garlico’s bride asks Charlie for the tights. Realising he has forgotten about them, Charlie tries to postpone Garlico’s performance, but the confused old man asks Garlico to come over to the stage and pulls up the backdrop, thus revealing a sight of him without his tights. The audience burst into laughter, but Garlico begins his performance anyway. In the wings, Charlie and his old colleague fight and the latter accidentally knocks out Garlico’s bride, prompting Charlie to step in as Garlico’s assistant. Proving to be an unhelpful assistant, he goes backstage while Garlico continues to flop on stage.

Garlico’s performance is disrupted when the old man suddenly pulls down the backdrop for “Sorrow”. Frustrated, he leaves the stage and throws a tantrum. He starts attacking Charlie, who then kicks him in the rear.

When “Sorrow” begins, a member of the audience boos and leaves, while Charlie and Garlico’s fight disrupts the onstage performance. Eventually Charlie pulls out a hose and squirts water over everyone.

== Cast ==
- Charlie Chaplin - The Property Man
- Phyllis Allen - Lena Fat
- Alice Davenport - Actress
- Charles Bennett - George Ham, Lena's husband
- Mack Sennett - Man in audience
- Norma Nichols - Vaudeville artist
- Joe Bordeaux - Old actor
- Harry McCoy - Drunk in audience
- Lee Morris - Man in audience

== Reviews ==
A reviewer from Bioscope wrote, "There are so many uproariously absurd situations in this Chaplin comic, all consequent upon the ardent desire of our friend 'Props' to run the whole of the affairs 'behind' that the vaudeville entertainment becomes one long chapter of unrehearsed happenings, much to the delight of an audience of which comical Mack Sennett forms a distinguished member."

A negative review of The Property Man came from Moving Picture World regarding some of the slapstick action in the two reels. The reviewer opined, "There are very few people who don't like these Keystones. They are thoroughly vulgar and touch the homely strings of our own vulgarity. They are not the best pictures for parlor entertainment, that is true. There is some brutality in this picture and we can't help feeling that this is reprehensible. What human being can see an old man kicked in the face and count it fun?"

== See also ==
- List of American films of 1914
