= Charlie Chaplin filmography =

Films by the British filmmaker

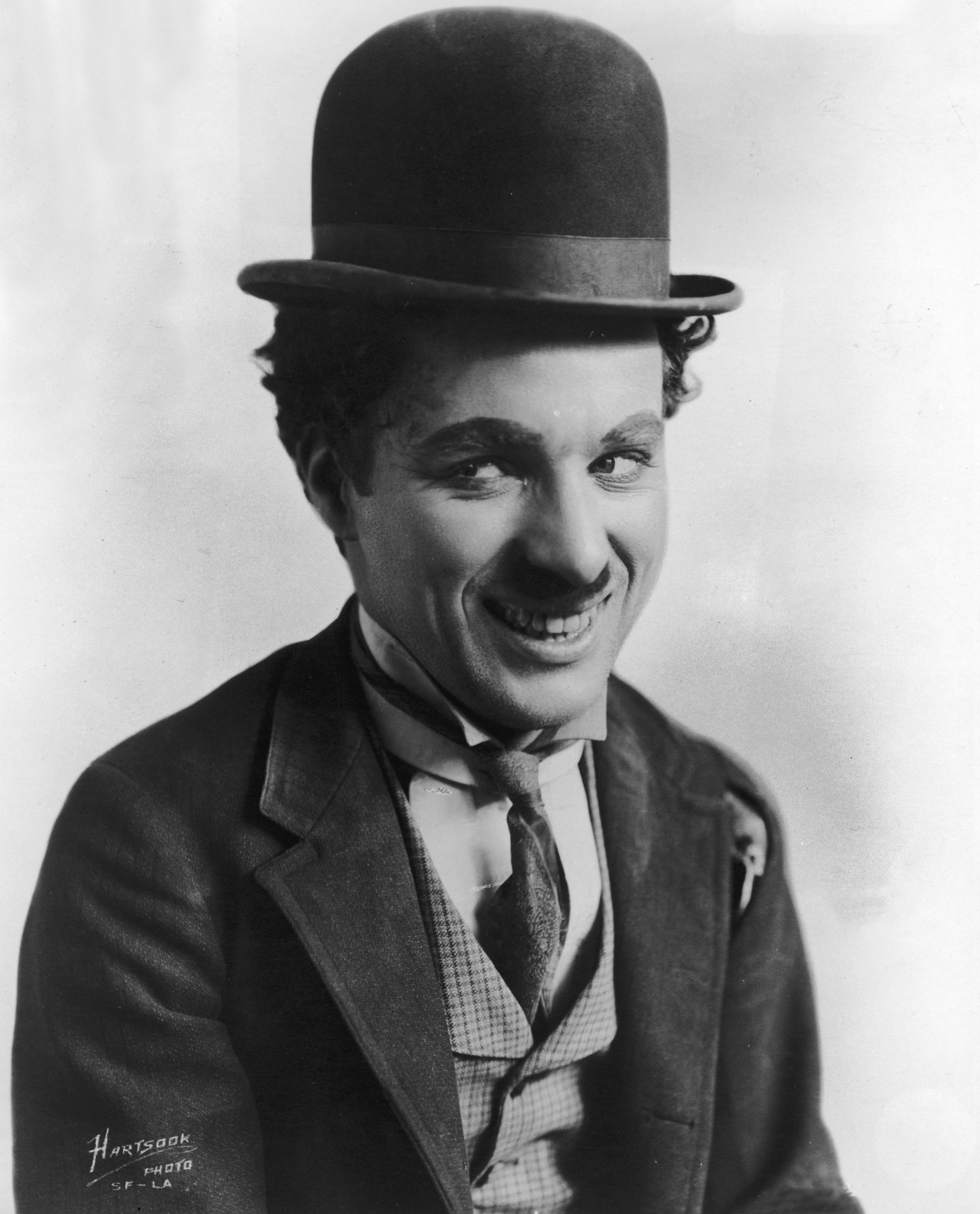
Chaplin in his "Tramp" persona

Charlie Chaplin (1889–1977) was an English internationally renowned Academy Award-winning comic actor, filmmaker, and composer who was best known for his career in Hollywood motion pictures from his debut in 1914 until 1952, he however subsequently appeared in two films in his native England. During his early years in the era of silent film, he rose to prominence as a worldwide cinematic idol renowned for his tramp persona. In the 1910s and 1920s, he was considered the most famous person on the planet.

Chaplin was born in Walworth, South London, and began acting on stage at the age of five when his mother's voice cracked. In 1913, while on tour in the United States with Fred Karno's comedy group, he accepted a contract to work for Keystone Film Company. During his time at Keystone, he began writing and directing some of the films in which he starred. Chaplin signed with the Essanay Film Manufacturing Company in 1915, and the year after with the Mutual Film Corporation.

Chaplin by 1918, began producing his own films, initially releasing them through First National Pictures and then through United Artists, a corporation he co-founded with Mary Pickford, Douglas Fairbanks, and D. W. Griffith. In the late 1940s and early 1950s, Chaplin was accused of being a Communist sympathiser, which he denied. He remained a British subject and, while travelling to England in 1952 to attend the premiere of his film Limelight, his American re-entry permit was rescinded. Chaplin eventually settled in Switzerland, where he remained for the rest of his life. He made his last two films in England.

During his lifetime, Chaplin received three awards from the Academy of Motion Picture Arts and Sciences. At the first Academy Awards ceremony, held on 16 May 1929, he was originally nominated for Best Actor and Best Director for The Circus (1928). The Academy dropped his two nominations, and he won an honorary award for writing, directing, producing, and acting. In 1972, he returned to the United States after nearly two decades to receive another honorary award, this time for his overall achievements in cinema. The following year, Chaplin's score for Limelight received the Academy Award for Best Music. Although 20 years old by this time, Limelight had not been released in the Los Angeles area until 1972, and had not been eligible for Academy Award consideration before then. Chaplin also received Academy Award nominations in 1940 for Best Actor and Best Original Screenplay for The Great Dictator. In 1942, Chaplin released a new version of The Gold Rush, taking the original silent 1925 film and composing and recording a musical score. The Gold Rush was nominated for Best Music (Scoring of a Dramatic or Comedy Picture). Notwithstanding the belated nomination for Limelight, his final contemporary nomination was in 1947 for his screenplay of Monsieur Verdoux.

For his work in motion pictures, Chaplin has a star on the Hollywood Walk of Fame and the American Film Institute has listed him among the best actors of the Classical Hollywood cinema era

Seven of the films in which Chaplin starred have been added to the Library of Congress National Film Registry: Kid Auto Races at Venice (1914), The Immigrant (1917), The Kid (1921), The Gold Rush (1925), The Circus (1928), City Lights (1931), Modern Times (1936), and The Great Dictator (1940). Also selected was Show People (1928), which featured Chaplin in a cameo.

== Chaplin filmography ==
In 1964, Chaplin established his official filmography with the publication of his book, My Autobiography. The filmography consisted of 80 motion pictures released since 1914. Further detail was added by David Robinson's 1985 biography, Chaplin: His Life and Art, which included Chaplin's last film, A Countess from Hong Kong (1967), as the 81st entry. In 2010 the 82nd film was added with the discovery of A Thief Catcher, an early Keystone film hitherto thought lost, with Chaplin's involvement previously unconfirmed.

All of Chaplin's films up to and including The Circus (1928) were silent, although many were re-issued with soundtracks. City Lights (1931) and Modern Times (1936) were essentially silent films, although they were made with soundtracks consisting of music and sound effects; the latter film also included talking sequences. All of Chaplin's last five films were talking pictures. Aside from A Countess From Hong Kong, all of Chaplin's films were photographed in 35mm black-and-white.

Unlike many of his contemporaries, Chaplin's film canon substantially survives, with only a handful of his films considered lost (one, A Woman of the Sea, due to Chaplin's own actions).

Except where otherwise referenced, the release dates, character names, and annotations presented here are derived from Chaplin's autobiography, Robinson's book, and The Films of Charlie Chaplin (1965) by Gerald D. McDonald, Michael Conway, and Mark Ricci.

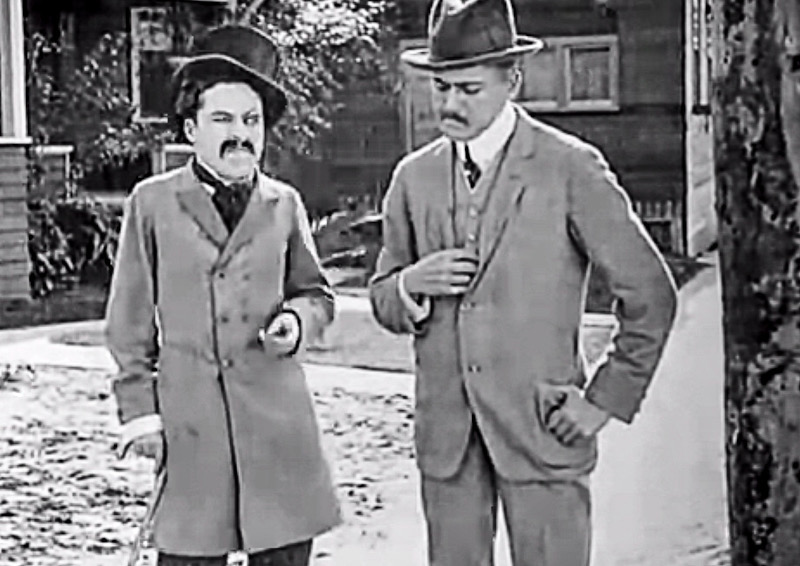
Screenshot of Charlie Chaplin (left) in scene with Henry Lehrman in "Making a Living"

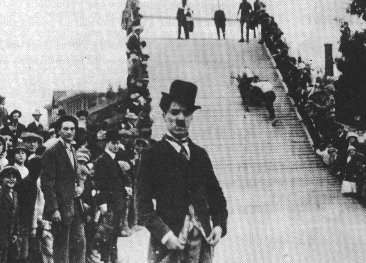
The "Little Tramp" during the film "Kid Auto Races at Venice"

Mabel's Strange Predicament

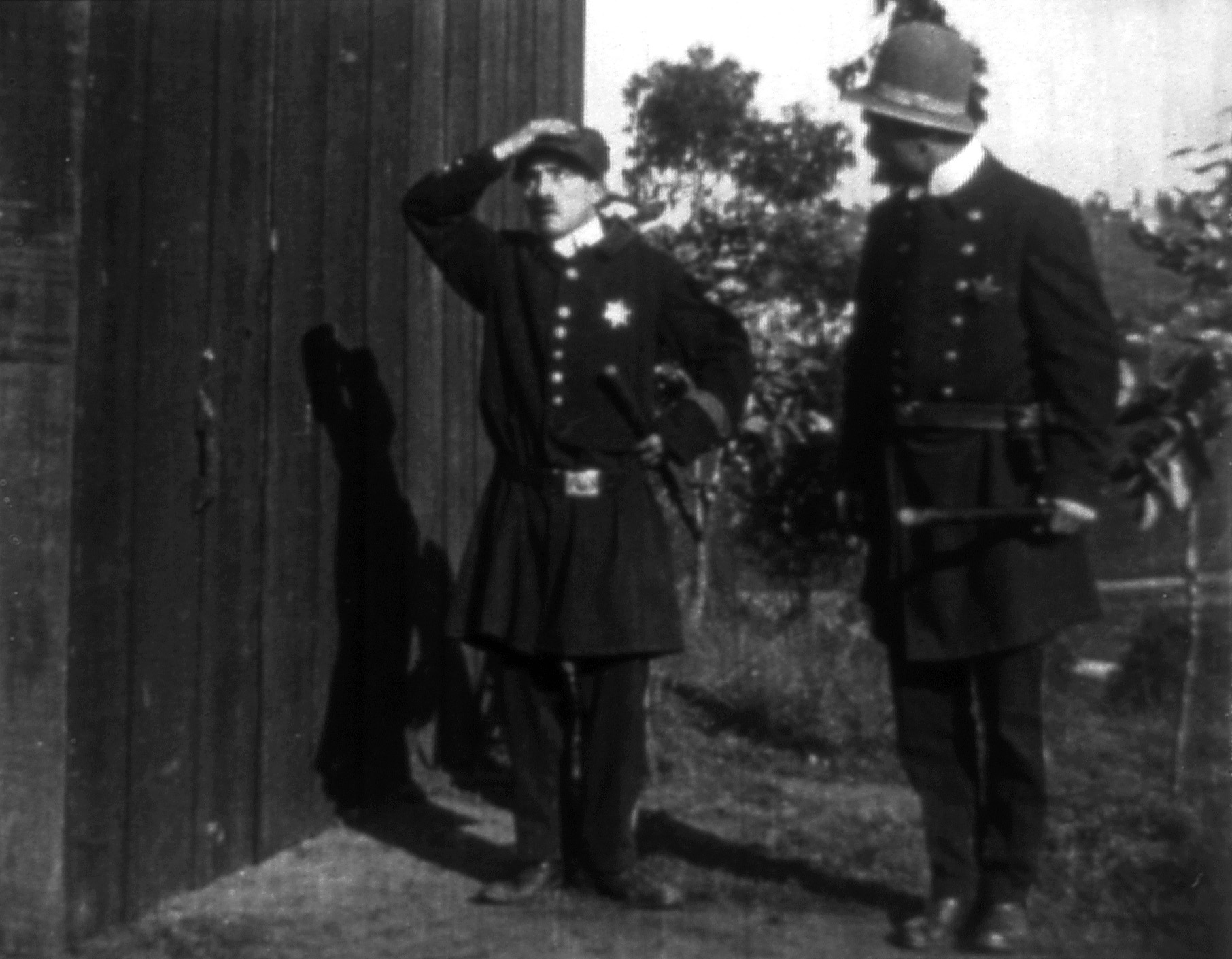
The Thief Catcher (1914) with Charlie Chaplin (left) as a Keystone Cop

=== Keystone ===
Chaplin appeared in 36 films for Keystone Studios, all produced by Mack Sennett. Except where noted, all films were one reel in length.

Release date	Title	Credited as					Notes
Release date	Title	Composer	Producer	Writer	Director	Role	Notes
2 February 1914	Making a Living					Swindler	
7 February 1914	Kid Auto Races at Venice					Tramp	Released on a split-reel (i.e. two films on one reel) with an education film, Olives and Trees. First released appearance of the Tramp, but see below. Added to the National Film Registry in 2020.
9 February 1914	Mabel's Strange Predicament					Tramp	Filmed before but released after Kid Auto Races at Venice, hence it was in this film that the Tramp costume was first used.
19 February 1914	A Thief Catcher					A Policeman	Print discovered in 2010.
28 February 1914	Between Showers					Masher (The Tramp)	
2 March 1914	A Film Johnnie					The Film Johnnie (The Tramp)	
9 March 1914	Tango Tangles					Tipsy Dancer	
16 March 1914	His Favorite Pastime					Drinker (The Tramp)	
26 March 1914	Cruel, Cruel Love					Lord Helpus	
4 April 1914	The Star Boarder					The Star boarder (The Tramp)	
18 April 1914	Mabel at the Wheel					Villain	Two reels
20 April 1914	Twenty Minutes of Love			Yes	Yes	Pickpocket (The Tramp)	
27 April 1914	Caught in a Cabaret					Waiter (The Tramp)	Two reels. Co-writer: Mabel Normand
4 May 1914	Caught in the Rain			Yes	Yes	Tipsy Hotel Guest (The Tramp)	
7 May 1914	A Busy Day			Yes	Yes	Wife	Released on a split-reel with an educational short, The Morning Papers.
1 June 1914	The Fatal Mallet					Suitor (The Tramp)	
4 June 1914	Her Friend the Bandit			Yes	Yes	Bandit	Lost film. Co-director: Mabel Normand.
11 June 1914	The Knockout					Referee (Considered by some to be The Tramp)	Two reels
13 June 1914	Mabel's Busy Day					Tipsy Nuisance	
20 June 1914	Mabel's Married Life			Yes	Yes	Mabel's Husband (The Tramp)	Co-writer: Mabel Normand
9 July 1914	Laughing Gas			Yes	Yes	Dentist's Assistant (The Tramp)	
1 August 1914	The Property Man			Yes	Yes	The Property Man (The Tramp)	Two reels
10 August 1914	The Face on the Barroom Floor			Yes	Yes	Artist (The Tramp)	Based on the poem by Hugh Antoine d'Arcy.
13 August 1914	Recreation			Yes	Yes	Tramp	Released as a split-reel with a travel short, The Yosemite.
27 August 1914	The Masquerader			Yes	Yes	Film Actor (The Tramp)	
31 August 1914	His New Profession			Yes	Yes	Charlie (The Tramp)	
7 September 1914	The Rounders			Yes	Yes	Reveller	Co-starring Roscoe Arbuckle
24 September 1914	The New Janitor			Yes	Yes	Janitor (The Tramp)	
10 October 1914	Those Love Pangs			Yes	Yes	Masher (The Tramp)	
26 October 1914	Dough and Dynamite			Yes	Yes	Waiter (The Tramp)	Two reels. Co-writer: Mack Sennett
29 October 1914	Gentlemen of Nerve			Yes	Yes	Impecunious Track Enthusiast (The Tramp)	
7 November 1914	His Musical Career			Yes	Yes	Piano Mover (The Tramp)	
9 November 1914	His Trysting Place			Yes	Yes	Husband (The Tramp)	Two reels
5 December 1914	Getting Acquainted			Yes	Yes	Spouse (The Tramp)	
7 December 1914	His Prehistoric Past			Yes	Yes	Weakchin (The Tramp)	Two reels
21 December 1914	Tillie's Punctured Romance					Charlie, a City Slicker	Six reels. From the play, Tillie's Nightmare, by A. Baldwin Sloane and Edgar Smith.

=== Essanay ===
Chaplin wrote, directed, and starred in 15 films for the Essanay Film Manufacturing Company, all produced by Jesse T. Robbins. Except where noted all films are two-reelers.

Release date	Title	Credited as					Notes
Release date	Title	Composer	Producer	Writer	Director	Role	Notes
1 February 1915	His New Job			Yes	Yes	Film Extra (The Tramp)	
15 February 1915	A Night Out			Yes	Yes	Reveller (The Tramp)	Debut of Edna Purviance
11 March 1915	The Champion			Yes	Yes	Aspiring Pugilist (The Tramp)	
18 March 1915	In the Park			Yes	Yes	Charlie (The Tramp)	One reel
1 April 1915	A Jitney Elopement			Yes	Yes	Suitor, the Fake Count (The Tramp)	
11 April 1915	The Tramp			Yes	Yes	The Tramp	
29 April 1915	By the Sea			Yes	Yes	Stroller (The Tramp)	One reel
21 June 1915	Work			Yes	Yes	Decorator's Apprentice (The Tramp)	
12 July 1915	A Woman			Yes	Yes	Charlie / "The Woman" (The Tramp)	
9 August 1915	The Bank			Yes	Yes	Janitor (The Tramp)	
4 October 1915	Shanghaied			Yes	Yes	Charlie (The Tramp)	
20 November 1915	A Night in the Show			Yes	Yes	Mr. Pest and Mr. Rowdy	
18 December 1915	A Burlesque on Carmen			Yes	Yes	Darn Hosiery	Re-issued on 22 April 1916, as an unauthorised four-reeler with new footage shot and assembled by Leo White.
27 May 1916	Police			Yes	Yes	Ex-Convict (The Tramp)	
11 August 1918	Triple Trouble			Yes	Yes	Janitor (The Tramp)	Compilation assembled by Leo White with scenes from Police and an unfinished short, Life, along with new material shot by White. Chaplin includes this production in the filmography of his autobiography.

=== Mutual ===
Chaplin wrote, produced, directed, and starred in 12 films for the Mutual Film Corporation, which formed Lone Star Studios solely for Chaplin's films. All of the Mutual releases are two reels in length. In 1932, Amadee J. Van Beuren of Van Beuren Studios purchased Chaplin's Mutual comedies for $10,000 each, added music by Gene Rodemich and Winston Sharples and sound effects, and re-released them through RKO Radio Pictures.

Release date	Title	Credited as					Notes
Release date	Title	Composer	Producer	Writer	Director	Role	Notes
15 May 1916	The Floorwalker		Yes	Yes	Yes	Impecunious Customer (The Tramp)	Co-writer: Vincent Bryan
12 June 1916	The Fireman		Yes	Yes	Yes	Fireman (The Tramp)	Co-writer: Vincent Bryan
10 July 1916	The Vagabond		Yes	Yes	Yes	Street Musician (The Tramp)	Co-writer: Vincent Bryan
7 August 1916	One A.M.		Yes	Yes	Yes	Drunk	
4 September 1916	The Count		Yes	Yes	Yes	Tailor's Apprentice (The Tramp)	
2 October 1916	The Pawnshop		Yes	Yes	Yes	Pawnbroker's Assistant (The Tramp)	
13 November 1916	Behind the Screen		Yes	Yes	Yes	Property Man's Assistant (The Tramp)	
4 December 1916	The Rink		Yes	Yes	Yes	Waiter and Skating Enthusiast (The Tramp)	
22 January 1917	Easy Street		Yes	Yes	Yes	Vagabond recruited to Police Force (The Tramp)	
16 April 1917	The Cure		Yes	Yes	Yes	Alcoholic Gentleman at Spa (Considered by some to be The Tramp)	
17 June 1917	The Immigrant		Yes	Yes	Yes	Immigrant (The Tramp)	Added to the National Film Registry in 1998.
22 October 1917	The Adventurer		Yes	Yes	Yes	Escaped Convict (The Tramp)	

=== First National ===
Chaplin wrote, produced, directed, and starred in 9 films for his own production company between 1918 and 1923. These films were distributed by First National.

Release date	Title	Credited as					Notes
Release date	Title	Composer	Producer	Writer	Director	Role	Notes
14 April 1918	A Dog's Life	Yes	Yes	Yes	Yes	Tramp	Three reels. Score composed for compilation, The Chaplin Revue
29 September 1918	The Bond		Yes	Yes	Yes	Tramp	Half-reel. Co stars brother Sydney Chaplin
20 October 1918	Shoulder Arms	Yes	Yes	Yes	Yes	Recruit (The Tramp)	Three reels. Score composed for compilation, The Chaplin Revue.
15 May 1919	Sunnyside	Yes	Yes	Yes	Yes	Farm Handyman (The Tramp)	Three reels. Score composed for 1974 re-release.
15 December 1919	A Day's Pleasure	Yes	Yes	Yes	Yes	Father (The Tramp)	Two reels. First film with Jackie Coogan, future star of The Kid. Score composed for 1973 re-release.
6 February 1921	The Kid	Yes	Yes	Yes	Yes	Tramp	Six reels. Score composed for 1971 re-release. Added to the National Film Registry in 2011.
25 September 1921	The Idle Class	Yes	Yes	Yes	Yes	Tramp / Husband	Two reels. Score composed for 1971 re-release.
2 April 1922	Pay Day	Yes	Yes	Yes	Yes	Laborer (The Tramp)	Two reels. Score composed for 1972 re-release. Chaplin's final short (of less than 30 minutes running time).
26 February 1923	The Pilgrim	Yes	Yes	Yes	Yes	Escaped Convict (Considered by some to be The Tramp)	Four reels. Score composed for compilation, The Chaplin Revue.

=== United Artists ===
Chaplin began releasing his films through United Artists in 1923. From this point on all of his films were of feature length. He produced, directed, and wrote these eight films and starred in all but the first. Beginning with City Lights Chaplin wrote the musical scores for his films as well.

Release date	Title	Credited as					Notes
Release date	Title	Composer	Producer	Writer	Director	Role	Notes
26 September 1923	A Woman of Paris	Yes	Yes	Yes	Yes	Porter	Chaplin has a small cameo role. Score composed for 1976 re-issue.
26 June 1925	The Gold Rush	Yes	Yes	Yes	Yes	Lone Prospector (The Tramp)	Score composed for 1942 re-issue. Added to the National Film Registry in 1992.
6 January 1928	The Circus	Yes	Yes	Yes	Yes	Tramp	Score composed for 1970 re-issue. The Academy Film Archive preserved The Circus in 2002.
30 January 1931	City Lights	Yes	Yes	Yes	Yes	Tramp	Added to the National Film Registry in 1991.
5 February 1936	Modern Times	Yes	Yes	Yes	Yes	A factory worker (The Tramp)	Added to the National Film Registry in 1989.
15 October 1940	The Great Dictator	Yes	Yes	Yes	Yes	Adenoid Hynkel / The Barber (Considered by some to be The Tramp)	Added to the National Film Registry in 1997. Nominated for Academy Award for Best Actor, Best Picture and Best Writing.
11 April 1947	Monsieur Verdoux	Yes	Yes	Yes	Yes	Monsieur Henri Verdoux	Based on an idea by Orson Welles. Nominated for Academy Award for Best Writing (Original Screenplay).
16 October 1952	Limelight	Yes	Yes	Yes	Yes	Calvero	Pulled from American screens shortly after its release when Chaplin became a political exile from the United States. Academy Award for Best Music (Scoring). (Awarded in 1973 when the film became first eligible for Academy Award consideration via Los Angeles screenings.)

=== British productions ===
In 1952, while travelling to England to attend the première of his film, Limelight, Chaplin learned that his American re-entry permit was rescinded. As a result, his last two films were made in England.

Release date	Title	Credited as					Notes
Release date	Title	Composer	Producer	Writer	Director	Role	Notes
12 September 1957	A King in New York	Yes	Yes	Yes	Yes	King Shahdov	Last starring role. An Attica-Archway production Not released in the United States until 1972.
5 January 1967	A Countess from Hong Kong	Yes		Yes	Yes	An Old Steward	A Universal Production in Panavision and Technicolor. Produced by Jerome Epstein. Chaplin has a small cameo role.

== Other film appearances ==
In addition to his official 82 films, Chaplin has several unfinished productions in his body of work. He made several cameo appearances as himself and was featured in several compilation films.

=== Uncompleted and unreleased films ===
Year(s)	Title	Credited as					Notes
Year(s)	Title	Composer	Producer	Writer	Director	Role	Notes
1915–1916	Life		Yes	Yes	Yes		Uncompleted, although parts were used in The Essanay-Chaplin Revue (see below).
1918	How to Make Movies		Yes	Yes	Yes	Himself	Never assembled, although parts were used in The Chaplin Revue (see below). Reconstructed in 1981 by Kevin Brownlow and David Gill.
1918	(untitled film)		Yes	Yes	Yes	Himself	A charity film co-starring Harry Lauder.
1919	The Professor		Yes	Yes	Yes	Professor Bosco	Slated as a two-reeler, but never issued.
c.1922	Nice and Friendly		Yes	Yes	Yes	Tramp	Improvised sketch.
1926	A Woman of the Sea		Yes				Completed but never released. Chaplin had the negative burned on 24 June 1933, making it lost.
1933	All at Sea					Himself	An 11-minute home film shot by Alistair Cooke onboard Chaplin's boat, Panacea, and featuring Cooke with Chaplin and Paulette Goddard.
1966–1975	The Freak			Yes			A production planned for Chaplin's daughter, Victoria.

=== Compilations ===
Many Chaplin-unauthorized compilations of his Keystone, Essanay and Mutual films were released in the years following his departure from those companies. This is not an exhaustive list but does contain the most notable and widely released examples. Eventually Chaplin re-edited and scored his First National shorts for reissue in 1959 and 1975.

Release date	Title	Credited as					Notes
Release date	Title	Composer	Producer	Writer	Director	Role	Notes
31 March 1915	Introducing Charlie Chaplin						Promo film intended for exhibitors to show as a prologue to Chaplin films.
23 September 1916	The Essanay-Chaplin Revue			Yes	Yes	Ex-convict	Compiled by Leo White from portions of Police and Life with new material directed by White.
1916	Zepped						A 7-minute reel of this WWI propaganda short, was discovered in 2009, with a second in 2011. The first copy was bought on eBay and later put up for auction, but the only bid failed to reach the reserve price.
May 1918	Chase Me Charlie			Yes	Yes		A seven-reel montage of Essanay films, edited by Langford Reed. Released in England.
Circa 1920	Charlie Butts In			Yes	Yes		Essentially a one-reel version of the second Essanay short, A Night Out, incorporating alternate takes and footage of Chaplin conducting a band at Mer Island.
1938	The Charlie Chaplin Carnival		Yes	Yes	Yes	Property Man's Assistant / Tailor's Apprentice / Fireman / Street Musician	Compiled from Behind the Screen, The Count, The Fireman, and The Vagabond, with additional music and added sound effects.
1938	The Charlie Chaplin Cavalcade		Yes	Yes	Yes	Drunk / Waiter and Skating Enthusiast / Pawnbroker's Assistant / Impecunious Customer	Compiled from One A.M., The Rink, The Pawnshop, and The Floorwalker, with additional music and added sound effects.
1938	The Charlie Chaplin Festival		Yes	Yes	Yes	Immigrant / The Derelict / The Inebriate / The Convict	Compiled from The Adventurer, The Cure, Easy Street and The Immigrant, with additional music and added sound effects.
25 September 1959	The Chaplin Revue	Yes	Yes	Yes	Yes	Tramp / Recruit / Escaped Convict / Himself	Compiled from A Dog's Life, Shoulder Arms, The Pilgrim, and How to Make Movies.
1975	The Gentleman Tramp						A compilation documentary featuring new scenes of Chaplin at his home in Switzerland.

=== Cameos ===
In addition to his own productions of A Woman of Paris (1923) and A Countess from Hong Kong (1967), Chaplin made cameo appearances as himself in the following films:

Year	Title	Notes
1915	His Regeneration	Charles Chaplin – Customer (uncredited)
1923	Souls for Sale	Shown on the set of A Woman of Paris.
1923	Hollywood	Lost film.
1928	Show People	Added to the National Film Registry in 2003.

== Bibliography ==
- McDonald, Gerald D.; Conway, Michael; Ricci, Mark (1974). The Films of Charlie Chaplin. Secaucus, New Jersey: Citadel Press. ISBN 9780806501970.
- Robinson, David (1985). Chaplin: His Life and Art. New York, St. Louis, San Francisco, Hamburg, Mexico: McGraw-Hill. ISBN 0070531811.
- Vance, Jeffrey; Maietta, Tony; Cushman, Robert (2008). Douglas Fairbanks. Berkeley, Los Angeles, London, England: University of California Press. ISBN 9780520256675.
- Chaplin, Charles (2003). My Autobiography. Penguin Classics. ISBN 9780141011479.
