= Hello, Mabel =

- Directed by: Mack Sennett (uncredited)
- Produced by: Mack Sennett
- Starring: Mabel Normand; Charley Chase; Al St. John
- Distributed by: Mutual Film
- Release date: October 18, 1914 (United States)
- Country: United States
- Languages: Silent; English intertitles

Hello, Mabel (also known as On a Busy Wire) is a 1914 American short silent comedy film produced and directed by Mack Sennett and starring Mabel Normand. The supporting cast features Charley Chase, Al St. John, Minta Durfee, and Mack Swain. A print of Hello, Mabel exists.

== Cast ==
- Mabel Normand as Mabel
- Phyllis Allen as Woman in hall
- Charley Chase as Mabel's boss
- Chester Conklin as Businessman
- Alice Davenport as His wife
- Minta Durfee
- Al St. John as Man in lobby
- Mack Swain as A married flirt
