= A Robust Romeo =

1914 film

- Directed by: George Nichols
- Starring: Fatty Arbuckle
- Release date: February 12, 1914
- Country: United States
- Languages: Silent; English intertitles

A Robust Romeo is a 1914 American short comedy film featuring Fatty Arbuckle.

== Plot ==
Arbuckle's character romances his married neighbor, but they are discovered. Arbuckle and the neighbor couple both, unwittingly, retreat to the same resort hotel to escape their scandal. The husband is enraged and suspects that Arbuckle and the wife planned the coincidence.

== Cast ==
- Phyllis Allen
- Roscoe "Fatty" Arbuckle
- Emma Clifton
- Alice Davenport
- Ford Sterling
- Mack Swain

== See also ==
- List of American films of 1914
- Fatty Arbuckle filmography
