= Love and Bullets =

Love and Bullets may refer to:

- Love and Bullets (1914 film), directed by and starring Roscoe "Fatty" Arbuckle
- Love and Bullets (1916 film), directed by Clay M. Greene
- Love and Bullets (1979 film), directed by Stuart Rosenberg and starring Charles Bronson
- Love and Bullets (2017 film), directed by Manetti Bros.
