= A Thief Catcher =

1914 film by Ford Sterling

- Full film
- Directed by: Ford Sterling
- Produced by: Mack Sennett
- Starring: Ford Sterling; Mack Swain; Edgar Kennedy; Charles Chaplin
- Distributed by: Keystone Studios
- Release date: February 19, 1914
- Running time: 1 reel c. 7 min, 35 sec
- Country: United States
- Languages: Silent film English (Original titles)

A Thief Catcher is a one-reel 1914 American comedy film, produced by Mack Sennett for his Keystone film company, directed by Ford Sterling, and starring Sterling, Mack Swain, Edgar Kennedy, and Charles Chaplin as a Keystone Cop.

== Plot ==
Three armed burglars stop atop an embankment to divide the loot from a recent crime. When one of the men complains about how the shares are split, a fight erupts. The complainer is eventually pushed over the embankment by the other two thieves. By chance, a police chief (Ford Sterling) who was out with his dog and his camera, takes a photo of the burglars. They spot him and pursue him. Eventually the police chief flees unknowingly to a barn which the burglars have been using as their hideout. The police chief appears to be cornered in the barn but he dispatches a note with his dog who takes it to police headquarters. The bumbling police force arrives and eventually captures the burglars, but not without considerable difficulty.

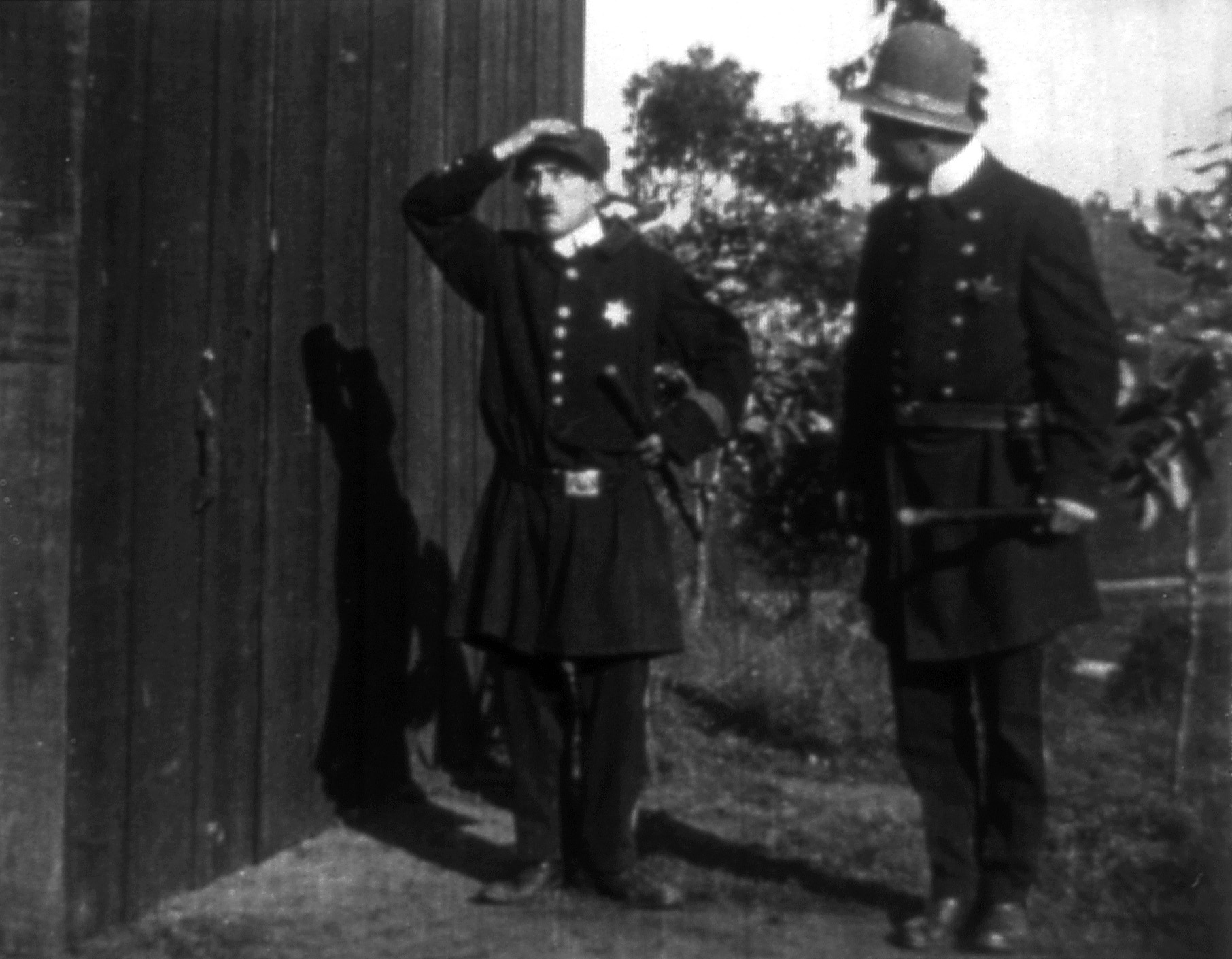
The Thief Catcher (1914) with Charlie Chaplin (left) as a Keystone Cop

== Cast ==
- Ford Sterling: Chief
- Charles Chaplin: Policeman (uncredited)
- William Hauber: Policeman (uncredited)
- George Jeske: Policeman (uncredited)
- Edgar Kennedy: Crook (uncredited)
- Rube Miller: Policeman (uncredited)
- Mack Swain: Crook (uncredited)

== Preservation status ==
The film was believed lost, and Chaplin's appearance was unknown, until a vintage 16mm print was discovered by director/film historian Paul E. Gierucki in 2010 at a Michigan antique sale. Chaplin had stated in interviews that he had played a bit-role as a policeman while at Keystone Studios.

== See also ==
- List of American films of 1914
- Charlie Chaplin filmography
- List of rediscovered films
