= Cruel, Cruel Love =

1914 film

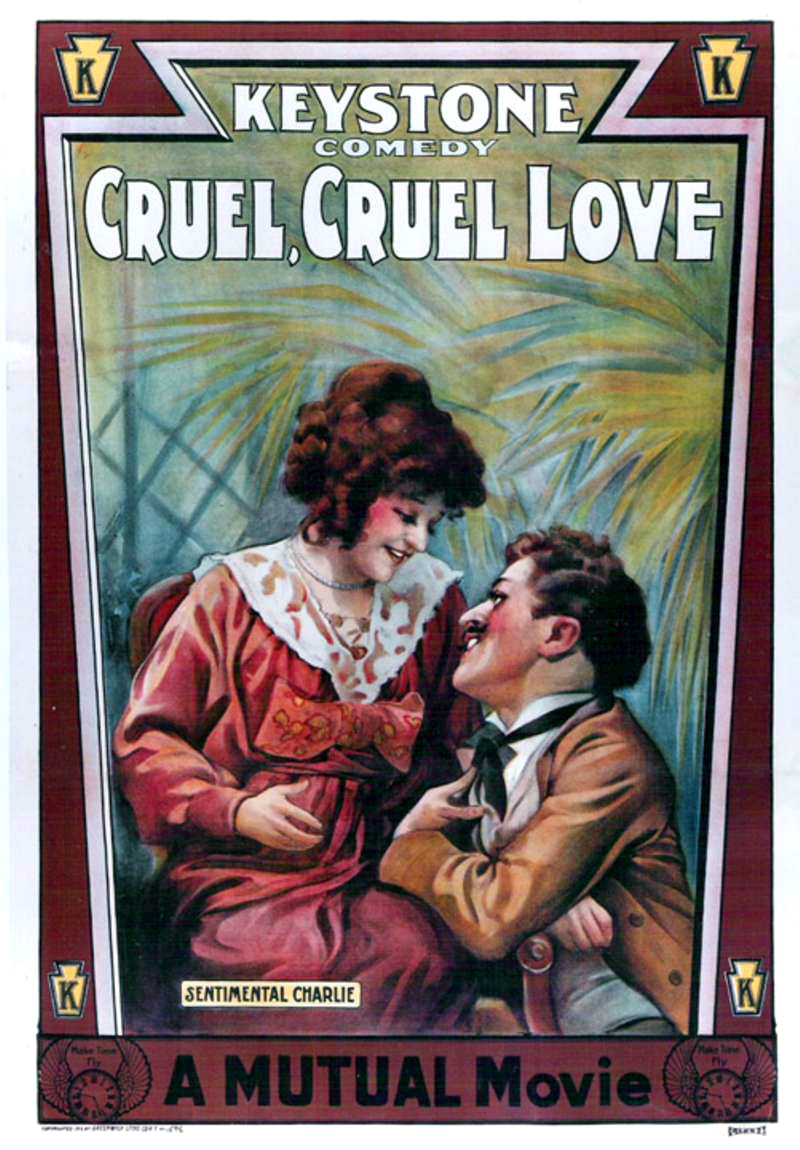
- Theatrical poster
- Directed by: George Nichols; Mack Sennett
- Written by: Craig Hutchinson
- Produced by: Mack Sennett
- Starring: Charlie Chaplin; Edgar Kennedy; Minta Durfee; Alice Davenport; Glen Cavender; Billy Gilbert; Chester Conklin (uncredited)
- Cinematography: Frank D. Williams
- Production company: Keystone Studios
- Distributed by: Mutual Film Corporation
- Release date: March 26, 1914
- Running time: 16 minutes
- Country: United States
- Languages: Silent; English (original titles)

Cruel, Cruel Love (1914)

Cruel, Cruel Love is a 1914 American comedy short silent film made at the Keystone Studios and starring Charlie Chaplin.

== Plot ==
Chaplin plays a rich, upper-class gentleman called Lord Helpus, whose romance is put in jeopardy when his girlfriend, jumps to the wrong conclusion after seeing him embracing her maid. She angrily sends him away, saying she never wants to see him again. Lord Helpus is distraught and decides to end his life, swallowing what he thinks is a glass of poison and imagining himself being tortured in Hell. The girlfriend's gardener and maid explain to her that Lord Helpus was not flirting at all and she sends a note of apology to him. Upon reading it, Lord Helpus flies into a panic and summons an ambulance to help him, before he dies from the fatal dose of poison; however, his butler had switched the liquid in the glass to harmless water, so there is n o danger.

The actress who played Chaplin's romantic interest, Minta Durfee, was the wife of fellow Keystone actor Roscoe "Fatty" Arbuckle.

== Cast ==
- Charlie Chaplin - Lord Helpus/Mr. Dovey
- Chester Conklin - Butler
- Minta Durfee - the Lady
- Eva Nelson - the Maid

== Preservation status ==
Cruel, Cruel Love was presumed to be a lost film for more than 50 years until a complete nitrate film copy in reasonable condition was discovered in South America. Restoration copies were made by David Shepard of Film Preservation Associates, and by Lobster Films of Paris, and its original two-reel format is available for sale.

== Review ==
A reviewer from Motion Picture World wrote, "Slight in texture, but it makes a pleasing, laughable picture."

== See also ==
- List of rediscovered films
- Charlie Chaplin filmography
