= Caught in a Cabaret =

1914 film by Mabel Normand

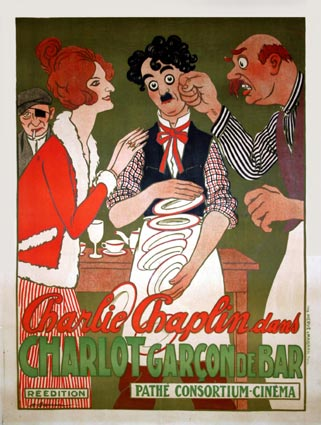
- Caught in a Cabaret in a French re-issue as Charlot Garçon de Bar
- Directed by: Mabel Normand
- Written by: Mabel Normand
- Produced by: Mack Sennett
- Starring: Mabel Normand; Charlie Chaplin; Harry McCoy; Chester Conklin; Edgar Kennedy; Minta Durfee; Phyllis Allen
- Cinematography: Frank D. Williams
- Distributed by: Keystone Studios
- Release date: April 27, 1914
- Running time: 30 minutes
- Country: United States
- Languages: Silent; English (original titles)

Caught in a Cabaret

Caught in a Cabaret is a 1914 short silent comedy film written and directed by Mabel Normand and starring Normand and Charlie Chaplin.

== Plot ==
Chaplin plays a waiter who fakes being the Prime Minister of Greenland to impress a girl. He then is invited to a garden party where he gets in trouble with the girl's jealous boyfriend.

== Cast ==
- Mabel Normand as Mabel
- Charlie Chaplin as Waiter
- Harry McCoy as Lover
- Chester Conklin as Waiter
- Edgar Kennedy as Cafe proprietor
- Minta Durfee as Dancer
- Phyllis Allen as Dancer
- Josef Swickard as Father
- Alice Davenport as Mother
- Gordon Griffith as Boy
- Alice Howell as Party Guest
- Hank Mann as Cabaret Patron
- Mack Swain as Big Tough Man
- Billy Gilbert as Cabaret Patron
- Wallace MacDonald as Party guest

== Reception ==
The Moving Picture World's review said, "This is another two-reel comedy manufactured in Mack Sennett's comical factory out in Californy State [sic]. It caused so much laughter you couldn't hear what the actors was talkin'. Charles Chaplin was the leading fun maker."

A reviewer for the New York Dramatic Mirror wrote, "Superlatives are dangerous epithets, especially when dealing with pictures. For that reason it is unwise to call this the funniest picture that has ever been produced, but it comes mighty close to it."

Mabel Normand wrote and directed comedies before Chaplin and mentored her older co-star.

== See also ==
- Charlie Chaplin filmography
- List of American films of 1914
