= The Sea Nymphs (film) =

1914 film

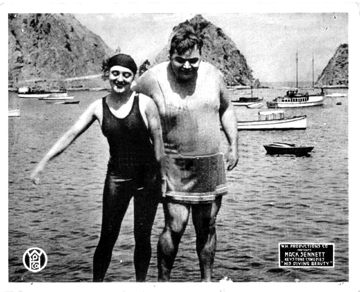
- Film still
- Directed by: Fatty Arbuckle
- Starring: Fatty Arbuckle
- Release date: November 23, 1914
- Country: United States
- Language: Silent (English intertitles)

The Sea Nymphs is a 1914 American short comedy film directed by and starring Fatty Arbuckle.

== Cast ==
- Minta Durfee - Fatty's wife
- Charles Avery - Mabel's father
- Ford Sterling - Man on beach
- Roscoe "Fatty" Arbuckle
- Alice Davenport - Fatty's mother in law
- Mabel Normand
- Al St. John
- Mack Swain
