= A Busy Day =

1914 film by Charlie Chaplin

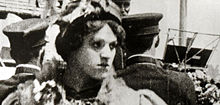
- Film scene
- Directed by: Charlie Chaplin
- Produced by: Mack Sennett
- Starring: Charlie Chaplin
- Cinematography: Frank D. Williams
- Production company: Keystone Studios
- Distributed by: Mutual Film
- Release date: May 7, 1914
- Running time: 6 minutes (1/2 reel)
- Country: United States
- Language: English

The film

A Busy Day is a 1914 silent comedy short film starring Charlie Chaplin and Mack Swain.

== Plot ==
A wife becomes jealous of her husband's interest in another woman during a military parade. On her way to attack the couple, the wife interrupts the set of a film, knocking over a film director and a police officer. Finally, the husband pushes the wife off a pier and she falls into the harbor.

== Cast ==
- Charlie Chaplin as Wife
- Mack Swain as Husband
- Phyllis Allen as The Other Woman
- Mack Sennett as Film director
- Billy Gilbert as Police officer
- Ted Edwards as Police officer

== Notes ==
According to the 1965 book The Films of Charlie Chaplin, A Busy Day is the first of three films in which Chaplin plays a woman. The other two were The Masquerader (1914) and A Woman (1915). Chaplin used the wardrobe of fellow Keystone player Alice Davenport.

It was typical for Mack Sennett to shoot Keystone comedies using real events—such as a parade—as the background for comic mayhem. This short film (about half a reel) was shot near San Pedro Harbor in less than two hours. In it, one can see interesting glimpses of First World War-era American naval ships in the background. The other part of the reel is an educational short titled The Morning Papers.

== Reception ==
A reviewer from Bioscope noted, "[Chaplin] gives an amazing exhibition of acrobatic humor."
