= The Star Boarder (1914 film) =

1914 film by George Nichols

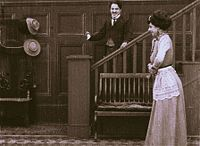
- Chaplin as the "star" boarder and Durfee as his attentive landlady
- Directed by: George Nichols
- Written by: Craig Hutchinson
- Produced by: Mack Sennett
- Starring: Charlie Chaplin; Minta Durfee; Edgar Kennedy; Gordon Griffith; Alice Davenport
- Cinematography: Frank D. Williams
- Distributed by: Keystone Studios
- Release date: April 4, 1914
- Running time: 16 minutes
- Country: United States
- Languages: Silent; English (original titles)

The Star Boarder

The Star Boarder is a 1914 American silent short comedy film starring Charlie Chaplin. The film is also known as The Landlady's Pet, its 1918 American reissue title.

== Synopsis ==
Charlie, a resident in a boarding house, is the favorite of his landlord's wife, which his fellow male boarders are jealous of, disliking him because of it. They arrange to scare Charlie with a dummy, who is frightened and runs to the police. Meanwhile, a tramp has hidden himself in a cupboard and the police find him, making Charlie a hero for the moment. However, the mischievous young son of the landlord has taken a series of compromising photographs and displays them to all the residents in a magic lantern show. Two scandals are revealed, with one photo showing Charlie kissing the landlord's wife, whilst another shows the landlord himself, flirting with another woman.

The young son was played by Gordon Griffith, who four years later would play the young title character in the first movie adaptation of Tarzan of the Apes.

== Review ==
Motion Picture News said of The Star Boarder, "[It is] a very funny comedy. The landlady is too familiar with the star boarder to suit her husband. He gets even, however, by going out with another woman."

== Cast ==
- Charlie Chaplin as the Star Boarder
- Minta Durfee as the Landlady
- Edgar Kennedy as the Landlady's husband
- Gordon Griffith as their son
- Alice Davenport as the Landlady's friend
- Phyllis Allen (uncredited boarder)
- Jess Dandy (uncredited boarder)
- Billy Gilbert (uncredited boarder)
- Wallace MacDonald (uncredited boarder)
- Harry McCoy (uncredited boarder)
- Rube Miller (uncredited boarder)
- Lee Morris (uncredited boarder)
- William Nigh (uncredited boarder)
- Al St. John (uncredited boarder)

== Reception ==
Like many American films of the time, The Star Boarder was subject to restrictions and cuts by city and state film censorship boards. For example, the Chicago Board of Censors required, when the film was submitted for review for its 1918 reissue as The Landlady's Pet, cuts of Chaplin thumbing his nose and the scene of Chaplin inflating his trousers and looking into them.

== See also ==
- List of American films of 1914
- Charlie Chaplin filmography
