= A Submarine Pirate =

1915 film

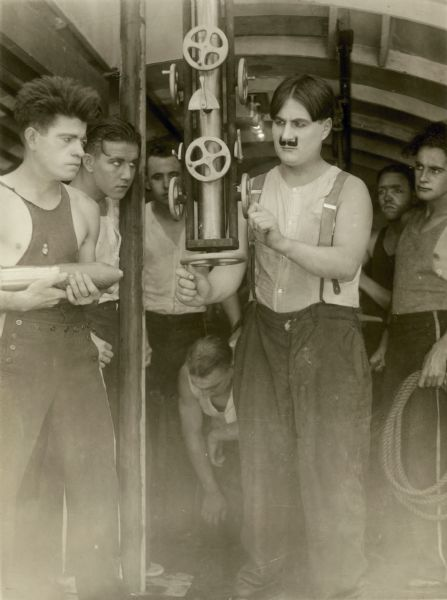
- Syd Chaplin at the periscope
- Directed by: Charles Avery; Syd Chaplin
- Written by: Mack Sennett
- Produced by: Mack Sennett
- Starring: Syd Chaplin
- Release date: November 14, 1915
- Country: United States
- Languages: Silent; English intertitles

Full film

A Submarine Pirate is a 1915 American short comedy film starring Syd Chaplin and featuring an early uncredited appearance by Harold Lloyd.

== Cast ==
- Syd Chaplin as Ambitious waiter
- Wesley Ruggles as The inventor's accomplice
- Glen Cavender as A shrewd inventor
- Phyllis Allen as A pugnacious guest
- Virginia Fox
- Edgar Kennedy
- Josh Binney as Hotel Manager
- Harold Lloyd as Cook
- Heinie Conklin
- Fritz Schade
- Ted Edwards as Waiter (uncredited)

== See also ==
- Harold Lloyd filmography
