= A Wreath in Time =

1909 film directed by D. W. Griffith

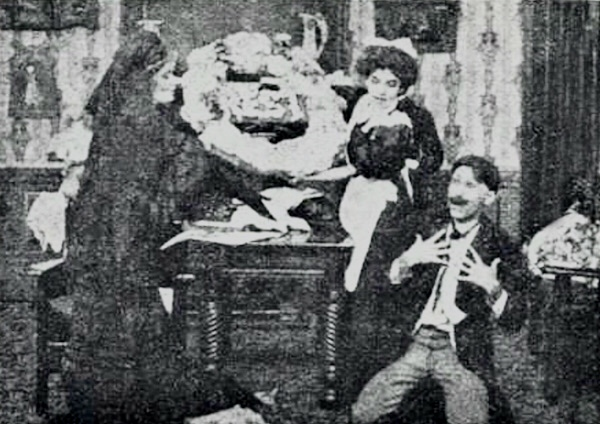
- Still with (from left) Florence Lawrence, an unidentified performer as the maid, and Mack Sennett
- Directed by: D. W. Griffith
- Written by: D. W. Griffith
- Produced by: Biograph Company; Manhattan, New York
- Starring: Mack Sennett; Florence Lawrence
- Cinematography: G. W. Bitzer
- Release date: February 8, 1909
- Running time: 9 minutes (split-reel, 558 feet)
- Country: United States
- Language: Silent

A Wreath in Time is a 1909 American silent comedy film written and directed by D. W. Griffith, produced by the Biograph Company of New York City, and co-starring Mack Sennett and Florence Lawrence. At its release in February 1909, the short was distributed to theaters on a "split reel", which was a single reel that accommodated more than one film. A Wreath in Time shared its reel with another Biograph short also directed by Griffith, the drama Edgar Allen Poe [sic]. (Note: When it was released in February 1909 and throughout its theatrical run, the film Edgar Allen Poe was consistently identified and advertised with Poe's middle name misspelled in its official title, using an "e" instead of the correct second "a".) Original paper rolls of contact prints of both motion pictures, as well as safety-stock copies of the two films, are preserved in the Library of Congress.

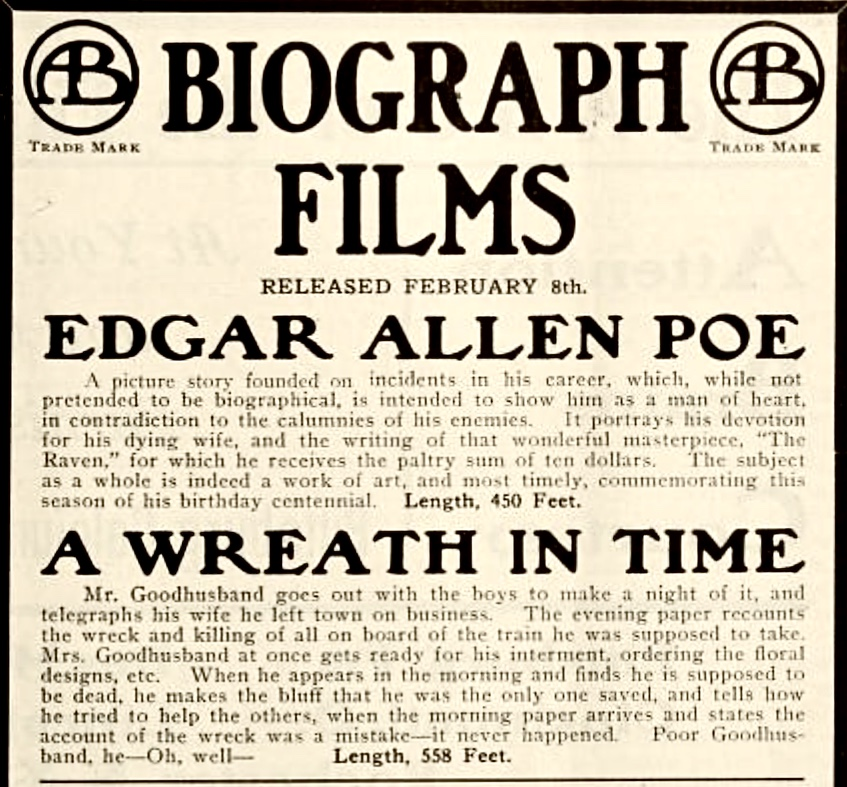
Promotion of film's split-reel release with Edgar Allen Poe (1909)

== Plot ==
In its published 1985 catalog of paper prints in its silent-film collection, the Library of Congress provides the following summary of the comedy's storyline:

A man (Mack Sennett) takes leave of his wife (Florence Lawrence) and goes off to a saloon, where his friends and the liquor influence him into going to a burlesque show. In order to make the night out legitimate, the men send messages to their wives saying they have gone to a fraternal conclave. In one scene, the camera moves in close to a theater box where the men are enjoying the dancers. The camera shifts to the man's home where his wife reads of a train wreck, assumes he is killed, and goes to the undertaker to buy a wreath. The last scene shows the erring husband returning home to find his wife wearing widow's weeds, and the wife is both happy and angry, but the film ends an embrace. (Note: "Widow's weeds" was a commonly used Anglo-American reference in the 1800s and early 1900s to describe the clothes worn by a widow during a period of mourning for her spouse (Old English wǣd, meaning "garment"). Refer to the subsection "Georgian and Victorian Eras" under "Europe" in Wikipedia's article on Mourning.)

== Cast ==
- Mack Sennett as John Goodhusband
- Florence Lawrence as Mrs. John Goodhusband
- Linda Arvidson as At Stage Door
- Charles Avery as At Stage Door
- Flora Finch as Actress on Stage
- George Gebhardt as In Bar / Actor on Stage
- Robert Harron as Messenger
- Anita Hendrie as Actress on Stage / At Stage Door
- Charles Inslee as In Bar
- Arthur V. Johnson as In Bar / Actor on Stage / Waiter
- Marion Leonard
- Jeanie MacPherson as At Stage Door
- David Miles as In Bar
- Harry Solter as Drinking Partner

== Production ==
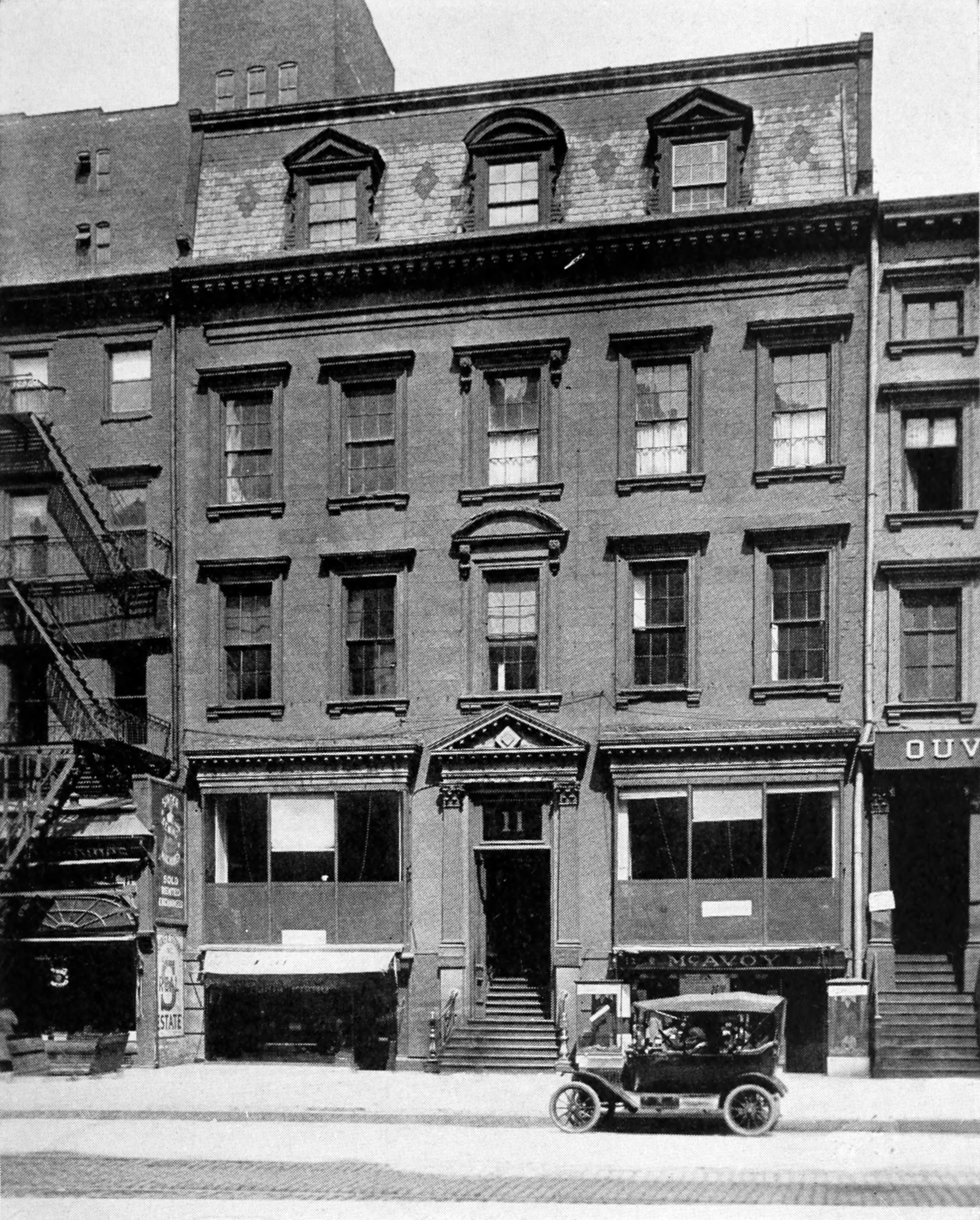
Biograph's Manhattan studio, where A Wreath in Time was filmed in December 1908

The screenplay for this short is credited to director Griffith, who produced the picture at Biograph's headquarters and main studio, which were located inside a renovated brownstone mansion at 11 East 14th Street in New York City. Filming was done there and also on location a short distance away from the studio, at the intersection of 8th Avenue and 14th Street, December 1–8, 1908 by Biograph cinematographer G. W. Bitzer.

=== The short's "anonymous" actors ===
Compiling and verifying cast members in early Biograph productions such as A Wreath in Time is made more difficult by the fact that Biograph, as a matter of company policy, did not begin publicly crediting its performers and identifying them in film-industry publications or in newspapers advertisements until four years after the release of this short. In its April 5, 1913 issue, the Chicago-based trade journal Motography in a news item titled "Biograph Identities Revealed" announces that "at last" Biograph "is ready to make known its players." That news item also informs filmgoers that for the price of ten cents they can purchase a poster from Biograph on which the names and respective portraits of 26 of the company’s principal actors were featured.

The co-stars of this short were among many early Biograph players who performed anonymously and were consistently uncredited in their screen appearances for the studio. Florence Lawrence, in the role of Mrs. John Goodhusband in this film, was known in 1909 to theater audiences only as the "Biograph Girl", although within a few years after this comedy's release, she would be widely publicized as one of the leading actors in the United States' motion-picture industry.

== Release and promotion ==
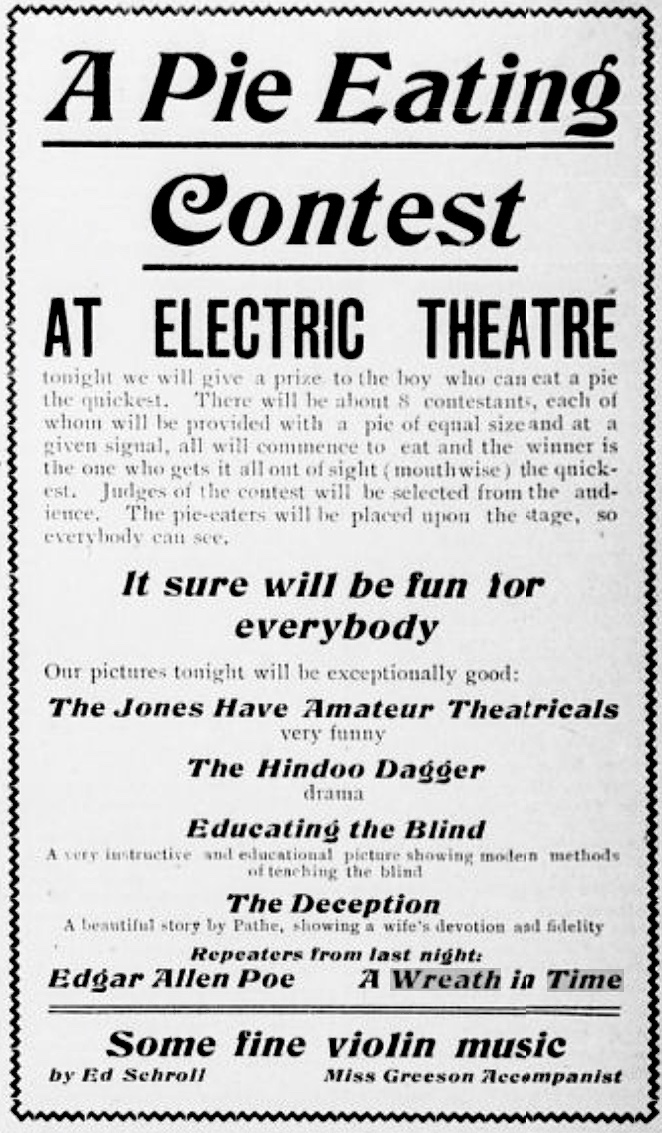
Newspaper ad for the film with five other releases in Conway, Arkansas, May 1909

Months after its release in February 1909, the film and its split-reel companion, Edgar Allen Poe, continued to circulate throughout the country. Most comments about both films in available sources from that year are not independent assessments and generally have commercial interests in promoting the Biograph productions. The local newspaper in Brunswick, Georgia, for example, employs the grandest terms in its October 27, 1909 issue to encourage residents to see the comedy short at the town's Grand Theatre. "'The Wreath in Time' is another great big biograph [sic] feature picture", adding "This is positively the greatest picture ever seen at the Grand." Earlier, the Dixie Theatre in Fairmont, West Virginia described the "photoplay" in its newspaper advertisement as a "laugh maker" and a "rich production". The theatre assured all prospective ticket buyers that the comedy and Edgar Allen Poe would satisfy them: "We guarantee both of these pictures and trust that our patrons will not miss them."

== Preservation status ==
Photographic prints and a film copy of A Wreath in Time exist. The Library of Congress (LC)) holds a reduced 203-foot roll of paper images printed directly from the comedy's original 35mm master negative. Submitted by Biograph to the United States government shortly before the film's release, the roll is part of the original documentation required by federal authorities for motion-picture companies to obtain copyright protection for their productions. While the LC's paper print record is not projectable, such paper copies can be transferred onto modern polyester-based safety film stock to produce rolls of negatives and then prints for screening. In fact, during the 1950s and early 1960s, Kemp R. Niver and other LC staff restored more than 3,000 early paper rolls of film images from the library's collection and transferred many to safety stock, including A Wreath in Time. (Note: The print footage of A Wreath in Time preserved in the Library of Congress is numbered "FLA5833"; the negative footage, "FRA2635".)

== See also ==
- D. W. Griffith filmography
