= Rebecca's Wedding Day =

1914 film

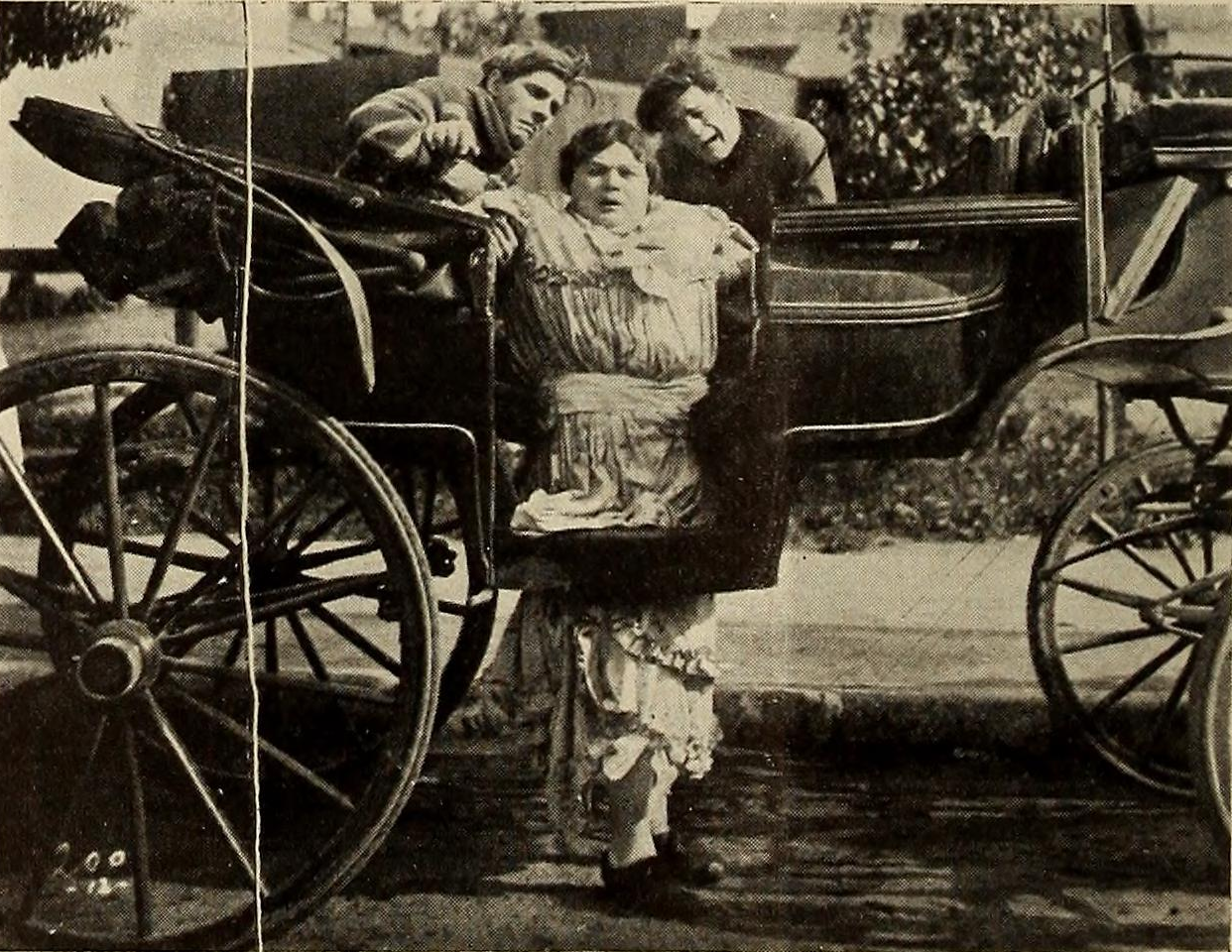
- Roscoe "Fatty" Arbuckle in publicity still
- Directed by: George Nichols
- Starring: Fatty Arbuckle
- Production company: Keystone Studios
- Distributed by: Mutual Film
- Release date: January 24, 1914
- Running time: 1 reel
- Country: United States
- Languages: Silent; English intertitles

Rebecca's Wedding Day is a 1914 American silent short comedy film directed by George Nichols and starring Fatty Arbuckle. The film was produced by Keystone Studios and distributed by Mutual Film.

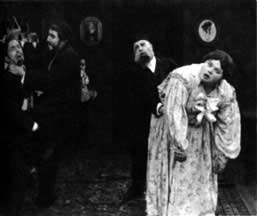
Roscoe 'Fatty' Arbuckle

== Plot ==
A fat Jewish woman named Rebecca is having trouble getting to her own wedding. A cab is called to take her to the wedding, but she falls through the floor due to her weight. Rebecca has to run behind the cab that her sister and the groom are taking to the wedding, where she is rejected by her fiancee in favor of her more attractive sister.

== Cast ==
- Phyllis Allen
- Roscoe "Fatty" Arbuckle - Rebecca
- Minta Durfee
- Virginia Kirtley as Rachael - Wedding Guest (as Jackie Kirtley)
- Billy Gilbert (as Little Billy Gilbert)

== Reception ==
The film was protested by the Anti-Defamation League, and Major M.L.C. Funkhouser, head of the Chicago Board of Censors, rejected it in its entirety as being offensive to Jewish people.

== See also ==
- List of American films of 1914
- Fatty Arbuckle filmography
