= Rum and Wall Paper =

1915 film

- Directed by: Charles Avery
- Starring: Fatty Arbuckle
- Release date: January 11, 1915
- Running time: 11 minutes
- Country: United States
- Languages: Silent; English intertitles

Rum and Wall Paper is a 1915 American short comedy film starring Fatty Arbuckle. Plot involves an inebriated wallpaper hanger who botches a job to comedic effect, papering a house with circus posters among other errors.

== Cast ==
- Roscoe "Fatty" Arbuckle
- Chester Conklin
- Alice Davenport
- Charles Murray
- Mabel Normand
- Frank Hayes

== See also ==
- Fatty Arbuckle filmography
