= Mother's Boy (1913 film) =

1913 film

- Directed by: Henry Lehrman
- Produced by: Mack Sennett
- Starring: Fatty Arbuckle
- Release date: September 25, 1913
- Country: United States
- Languages: Silent; English intertitles

Mother's Boy is a 1913 short comedy film starring Fatty Arbuckle.

== Cast ==
- Phyllis Allen
- Roscoe "Fatty" Arbuckle
- Nick Cogley
- Alice Davenport
- Billy Gilbert (as Little Billy Gilbert)
- Edgar Kennedy

== See also ==
- List of American films of 1913
