= Love, Speed and Thrills =

- Directed by: Walter Wright
- Produced by: Mack Sennett
- Starring: Mack Swain; Chester Conklin; Minta Durfee
- Production company: Keystone Studios
- Distributed by: Mutual Film
- Release date: January 18, 1915
- Running time: 13 minutes
- Country: United States
- Language: Silent (English intertitles)

Love, Speed and Thrills is a 1915 American silent comedy short film produced by Mack Sennett, directed by Walter Wright, starring Mack Swain, Chester Conklin and Minta Durfee, and featuring Billy Gilbert, Charley Chase and the Keystone Cops in supporting roles.

== Plot summary ==
Love, Speed and Thrills involves a loving husband and a wife-stealing wolf, both after the same woman.

== Cast ==
- Mack Swain as Ambrose
- Minta Durfee as Ambrose's Wife
- Chester Conklin as Mr. Walrus
- Billy Gilbert
- Josef Swickard as Chief of the Keystone Cops
- Charley Chase

== Preservation ==
A 16 mm print is held by the George Eastman Museum, the film is available on DVD with Cohens and Kellys in Atlantic City from Looser Than Loose Vintage Entertainment.
