= The Riot (1913 film) =

1913 film

- Directed by: Mack Sennett
- Starring: Fatty Arbuckle
- Release date: August 11, 1913
- Country: United States
- Languages: Silent; English intertitles

The Riot is a 1913 American short comedy film directed by Mack Sennett and starring Fatty Arbuckle.

== Cast ==
- Phyllis Allen
- Roscoe "Fatty" Arbuckle
- Alice Davenport
- Hank Mann
- Charles Murray
- Mabel Normand
- Ford Sterling
- Al St. John

== See also ==
- List of American films of 1913
