= Love and Bullets (1914 film) =

1914 film

- Directed by: Fatty Arbuckle
- Produced by: Mack Sennett
- Starring: Fatty Arbuckle
- Production company: Keystone Studios
- Distributed by: Mutual Film
- Release date: July 4, 1914
- Running time: 1 reel
- Country: United States
- Languages: Silent; English intertitles

Love and Bullets is a 1914 American silent short comedy film directed by and starring Fatty Arbuckle. The film was later re-released in 1918 under the new title The Trouble Mender.

== Cast ==
- Phyllis Allen
- Roscoe "Fatty" Arbuckle
- Charley Chase
- Charles Murray
- Mack Swain

== Preservation ==
A 35mm nitrate print of Love and Bullets was donated to George Eastman House as part of the Roberto Pallme Collection in 1998.

== See also ==
- List of American films of 1914
