= The Telltale Light =

1913 film

- Directed by: Mack Sennett
- Starring: Fatty Arbuckle
- Release date: July 10, 1913
- Country: United States
- Languages: Silent; English intertitles

The Telltale Light is a 1913 American short comedy film featuring Fatty Arbuckle.

== Cast ==
- Roscoe "Fatty" Arbuckle
- Charles Avery
- Alice Davenport
- Mabel Normand

== See also ==
- List of American films of 1913
- Fatty Arbuckle filmography
