= The Rounders (1914 film) =

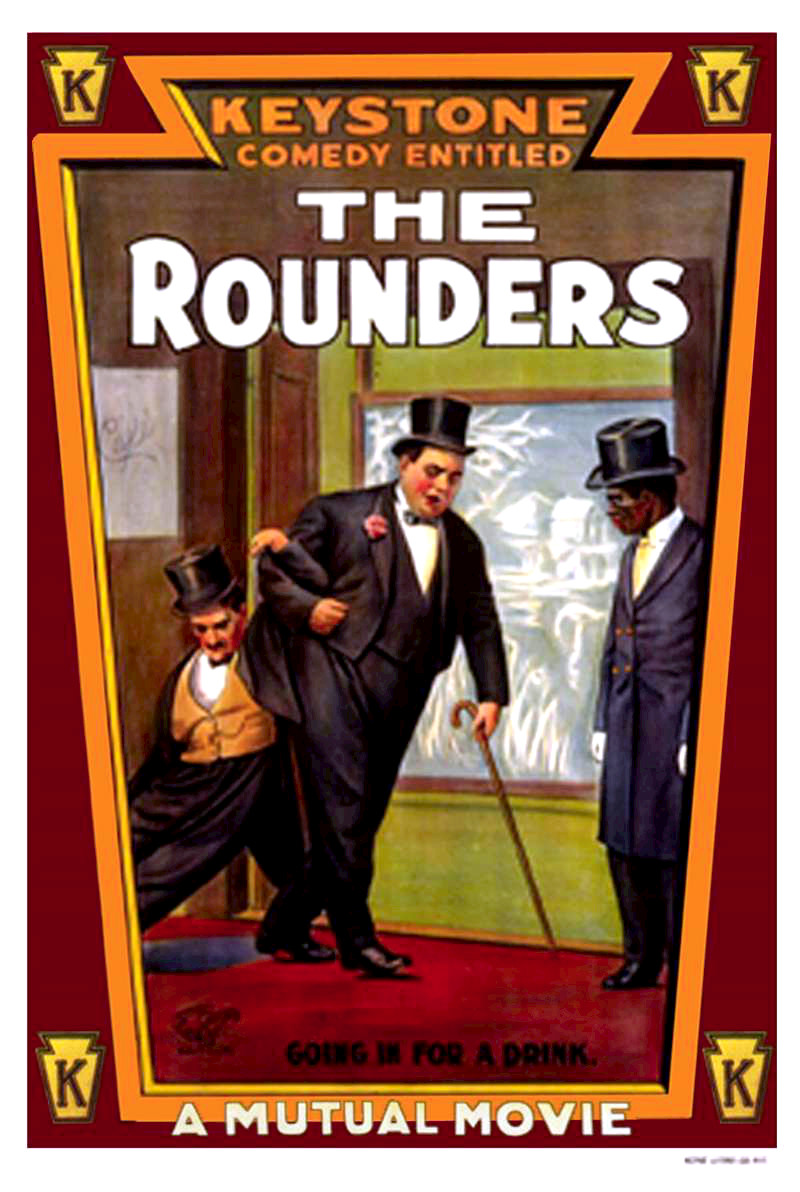
- Theatrical poster
- Directed by: Charlie Chaplin
- Written by: Charlie Chaplin
- Produced by: Mack Sennett
- Starring: Charlie Chaplin; Roscoe Arbuckle
- Cinematography: Frank D. Williams
- Edited by: Charlie Chaplin
- Production company: Keystone Studios
- Distributed by: Mutual Film
- Release date: September 7, 1914
- Running time: 16 minutes
- Country: United States
- Languages: Silent film English intertitles

The Rounders

The Rounders is a 1914 comedy short starring Charlie Chaplin and Roscoe Arbuckle. The film involves two drunks who get into trouble with their wives, and was written and directed by Chaplin.

== Plot ==
A drunk reveller, Mr. Full, returns home to a scolding from his wife. Then his equally inebriated neighbor, Mr. Fuller, comes home and starts a fight with his wife. When Mrs. Full hears the physical altercation across the hall (Mr. Fuller starts strangling his wife after she hits him), she sends her husband to investigate. The two wives begin arguing, while Mr. Full and Mr. Fuller seize the opportunity to steal their wives’ money and flee together to a cafe, where they also cause trouble. When their spouses find them, they escape to a leaky rowboat on a pond. Safely out of reach of their wives and the victims of the commotion they caused, they fall asleep, oblivious to the rising water into which they eventually disappear.

== Cast ==
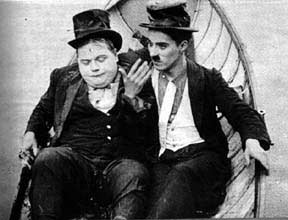
Chaplin and Arbuckle in the final scene.

- Charlie Chaplin as Mr. Full
- Roscoe Arbuckle as Mr. Fuller
- Phyllis Allen as Mrs. Full
- Minta Durfee as Mrs. Fuller
- Al St. John as Bellhop/Waiter
- Jess Dandy as Diner
- Wallace MacDonald as Diner
- Charley Chase as Diner
- Billy Gilbert as Doorman in blackface (uncredited)
- Cecile Arnold as Hotel guest (uncredited)
- Dixie Chene as Diner (uncredited)
- Edward F. Cline as Hotel guest in lobby (uncredited)
- Ted Edwards as Cop (uncredited)
- William Hauber as Waiter (uncredited)
- Edgar Kennedy in Bit Part (uncredited)

== Title ==
Now somewhat antiquated, the term "rounder" was once commonly used to mean "a habitual drunkard or wastrel".

== Reception ==
Moving Picture World wrote, "It is a rough picture for rough people, that people, whether rough or gentle, will probably have to laugh over while it is on the screen. Chas. Chapman [sic] and the Fat Boy appear in this as a couple of genial jags."

== See also ==
- List of American films of 1914
- Charlie Chaplin filmography
- Fatty Arbuckle filmography
