= Fickle Fatty's Fall =

1915 film

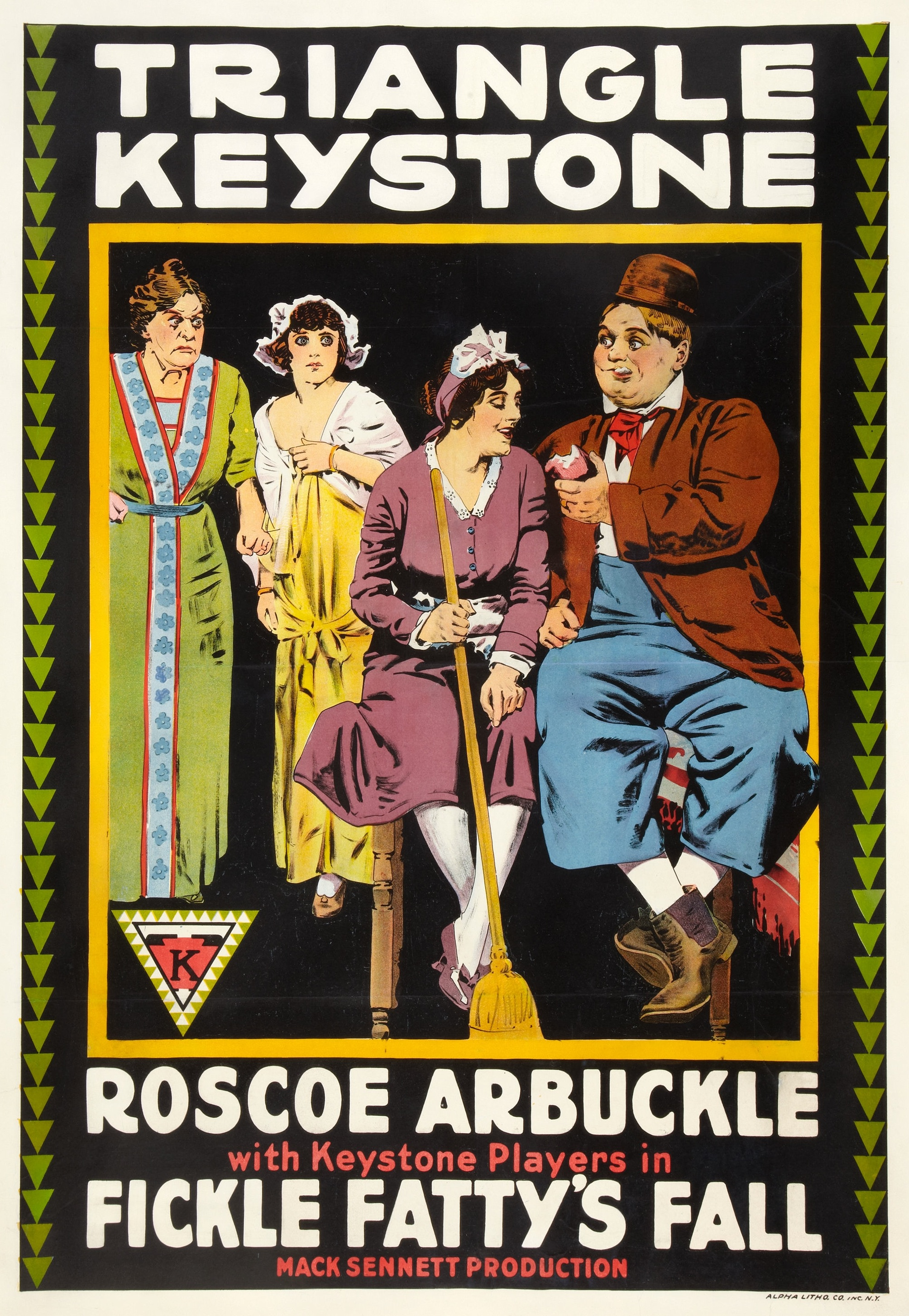
- Film poster
- Directed by: Fatty Arbuckle
- Written by: Mack Sennett
- Starring: Fatty Arbuckle
- Production company: Keystone Studios
- Distributed by: Triangle Film Corporation
- Release date: November 3, 1915
- Country: United States
- Languages: Silent; English intertitles

Fickle Fatty's Fall is a 1915 American short comedy film directed by and starring Fatty Arbuckle.

== Cast ==
- Phyllis Allen
- Roscoe "Fatty" Arbuckle
- Glen Cavender
- Ivy Crosthwaite
- Alice Davenport
- Bobby Dunn
- Minta Durfee
- May Emory
- Edgar Kennedy
- Fritz Schade
- Al St. John
- Bobby Vernon
- Guy Woodward

== See also ==
- Fatty Arbuckle filmography
