= Charles Avery (actor) =

American actor (1873–1926)

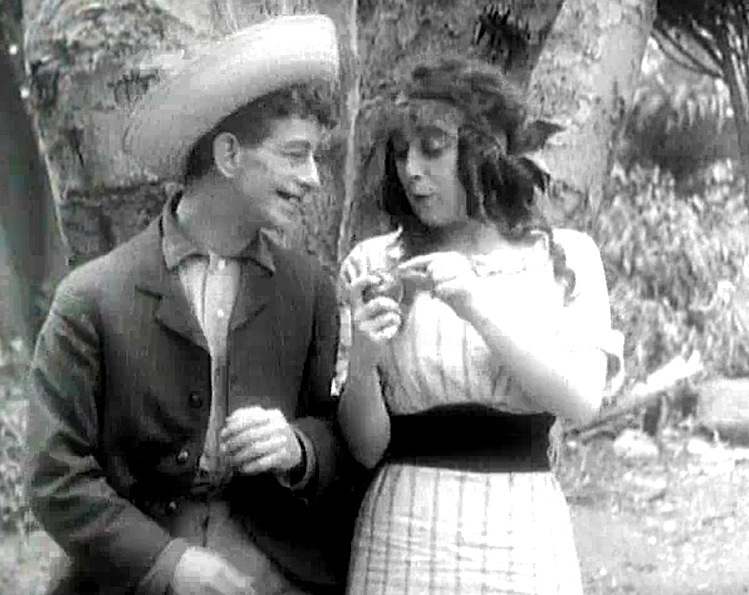
- Avery (left) with Mabel Normand in Won in a Closet (1914), the second film she directed
- Born: Charles Avery Bradford; May 28, 1873; Chicago, Illinois, United States
- Died: July 23, 1926 (aged 53); Los Angeles, California, United States
- Occupations: Actor, film director
- Years active: 1897–1926
- Spouses: Katharine Gormley (m. 1900–1913) Margaret E Royster (m. 1914–1917)

Charles Avery (born Charles Avery Bradford; May 28, 1873 – July 23, 1926) was an American actor and film director in the silent film era. Avery was one of the original seven Keystone Cops.

== Early life and education ==
Charles Avery was born in Chicago, and educated in Boston. His sister Charlotte was also an actress, as was his mother Marie Stanley. His father was a playwright.

== Career ==
He started acting in the theatre, playing the title role in Charley's Aunt, and the part of Pegleg Hopkins in the adaptation of David Harum which had William H. Crane in the lead role.

Avery appeared in a touring production of The Clansman as Governor Shrimp, before entering films with the Biograph Company in 1908.

From 1908 to 1909, Avery featured in 33 short films under the direction of D. W. Griffith, usually only in supporting roles and often alongside Mack Sennett.

In 1913, he tried his hand at directing, starting with Across the Alley at Keystone Studios. Avery went on to direct Syd Chaplin in the Gussle series and Charles Murray in the Hogan series. He also continued to act, notably in the first three Keystone Cops films.

Leaving directorial duties in the 1920s, Avery later played supporting roles in low-budget Westerns such as The Rambling Ranger and Western Rover.

== Death ==
On July 23, 1926, Avery was found dead in his Los Angeles home. His cause of death was acute dilation of the heart caused by chronic myocarditis.

== Filmography ==
- Father Gets in the Game (1908)
- The Taming of the Shrew (1908)
- The Valet's Wife (1908)
- The Helping Hand (1908)
- Love Finds a Way (1909)
- A Wreath in Time (1909)
- Tragic Love (1909)
- The Salvation Army Lass (1909)
- Jones and His New Neighbors (1909)
- A Drunkard's Reformation (1909)
- Confidence (1909)
- Twin Brothers (1909)
- Tis an Ill Wind That Blows No Good (1909)
- The Suicide Club (1909)
- One Busy Hour (1909)
- The French Duel (1909)
- The Jilt (1909)
- Resurrection (1909)
- Two Memories (1909)
- Eradicating Aunty (1909)
- What Drink Did (1909)
- The Violin Maker of Cremona (1909)
- The Lonely Villa (1909)
- The Son's Return (1909)
- Her First Biscuits (1909)
- Was Justice Served? (1909)
- The Peachbasket Hat (1909)
- The Necklace (1909)
- The Cardinal's Conspiracy (1909)
- A Strange Meeting (1909)
- With Her Card (1909)
- The Seventh Day (1909)
- The Little Darling (1909)
- Dooley's Thanksgiving Turkey (1909)
- A Romance of the Prairie (1910)
- Dooley's Holiday (1910)
- Dooley Referees the Big Fight (1910)
- The Man from Texas (1910)
- Perils of the Plains (1910)
- A Ranchman's Simple Son (1910)
- The Brave Hunter (1912)
- Home Folks (1912)
- The Would-Be Shriner (1912)
- Tragedy of the Dress Suit (1912)
- Hoffmeyer's Legacy (1912)
- A Day's Outing (1912)
- A Deaf Burglar (1913)
- The Rural Third Degree (1913)
- Safe in Jail (1913)
- The Sleuth's Last Stand (1913)
- Their First Execution (1913)
- Peeping Pete (1913)
- The Telltale Light (1913)
- Cohen's Outing (1913)
- The Work Habit (1913)
- Mabel's New Hero (1913)
- Mabel's Dramatic Career (1913)
- A Quiet Little Wedding (1913)
- A Muddy Romance (1913)
- A Ride for a Bride (1913)
- The Mystery of the Milk (1914)
- In the Clutches of the Gang (1914)
- Twixt Love and Fire (1914)
- The Sea Nymphs (1914)
- The Fighting Ranger (1925)
- The Blackbird (1926)
- The Rambling Ranger (1927)
- The Western Rover (1927)

=== Director ===
- Across the Alley (1913)
- Across the Hall (1914)
- The Knockout (1914)
- Love and Salt Water (1914)
- The Great Toe Mystery (1914)
- Her Last Chance (1914)
- Hogan's Annual Spree (1914)
- His Second Childhood (1914)
- Gussle's Wayward Path (1915)
- Hogan's Wild Oats (1915)
- Rum and Wall Paper (1915)
- Hogan's Mussy Job (1915)
- Hogan, the Porter (1915)
- Hogan's Romance Upset (1915)
- Hogan's Aristocratic Dream (1915)
- Hogan Out West (1915)
- Gussle's Day of Rest (1915)
- The Beauty Bunglers (1915)
- Gussle's Wayward Way (1915)
- Their Social Splash (1915)
- Gussle Tied to Trouble (1915)
- Gussle's Backward Way (1915)
- A Submarine Pirate (1915)
- A Modern Enoch Arden (1916)
- His Lying Heart (1916)
- Her Birthday Knight (1917)
- Her Candy Kid (1917)
- Done in Oil (1917)
- The House of Scandal (1917)
- Her Donkey Love (1917)
- His Unconscious Conscience (1917)
- Caught in the End (1917/I)
- A Kaiser There Was (1919)
- The Riot (1921)
- The Applicant (1921)

=== Stageplays ===
- Charley's Aunt (1897)
- David Harum (1900)
- David Harum (1902)
- Miss Elizabeth's Prisoner (1903)
- David Harum (1904)
- The Clansman (1906)
