= Pay Day (1922 film) =

1922 film

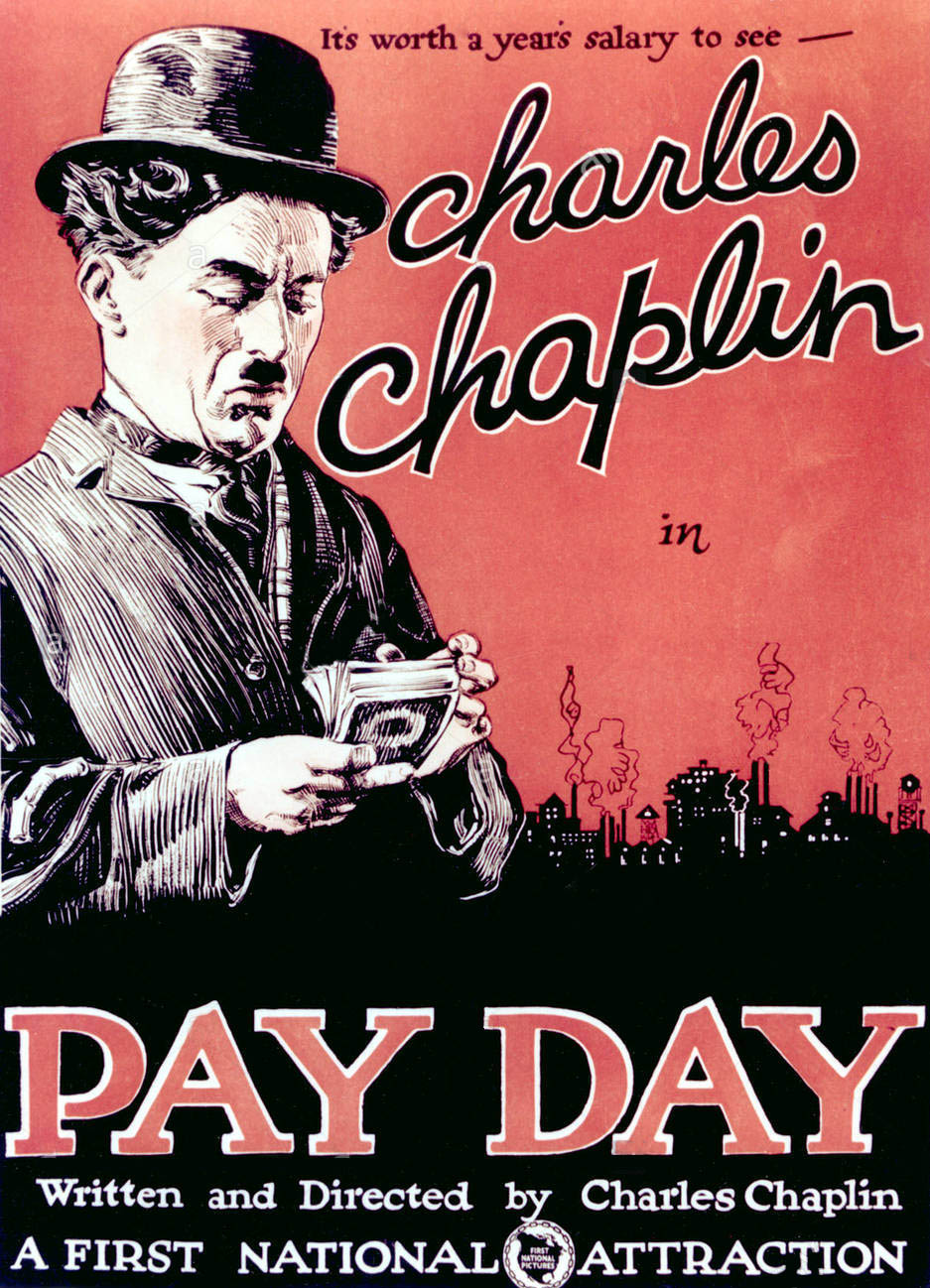
- Theatrical release poster
- Directed by: Charlie Chaplin
- Written by: Charlie Chaplin
- Starring: Charlie Chaplin; Edna Purviance; Mack Swain; Syd Chaplin
- Cinematography: Roland Totheroh
- Production company: Charles Chaplin Productions
- Distributed by: First National Pictures
- Release date: April 2, 1922
- Running time: 22 minutes
- Country: United States
- Language: Silent (English intertitles)

Pay Day (1922) by Charlie Chaplin

Pay Day (1922) is an American short film made by First National Pictures. Charlie Chaplin wrote, directed, and starred in the film. It is Chaplin's final two-reel short film.

== Plot ==
Chaplin plays a laborer on a house construction site. When he gets paid, his wife wants all the money, but he manages to keep enough of it to go out drinking. He returns home just in time to pretend he has just woken up to go to work.

== Cast ==
- Charlie Chaplin as Laborer
- Phyllis Allen as Laborer's Wife
- Mack Swain as Foreman
- Edna Purviance as Foreman's Daughter
- Syd Chaplin as Mustachioed Workman/Laborer's Friend/Lunch Cart Owner
- John Rand as Workman
- Loyal Underwood as Bearded Workman
- Henry Bergman as Fat Workman
- Al Ernest Garcia as Tall Workman

== Reception ==
According to Chaplin biographer Jeffrey Vance, "Pay Day, is a delightful, polished work that was Chaplin’s last two-reel comedy." He notes that Monta Bell, a future director and producer, was engaged as a general assistant and helped Chaplin develop the film's scenario on paper prior to production. This made it possible for Chaplin to make Pay Day in 31 production days (a sharp contrast to the five months required to complete his previous two-reel comedy, The Idle Class).
