= A Ride for a Bride =

1913 film

- Directed by: George Nichols
- Starring: Fatty Arbuckle
- Release date: December 8, 1913
- Country: United States
- Languages: Silent; English intertitles

A Ride for a Bride is a 1913 short comedy film featuring Fatty Arbuckle.

== Plot ==
Along the canals of Venice, Fatty and his sweetheart take a frightening ride.

== Cast ==
- Roscoe "Fatty" Arbuckle: Fatty
- Edgar Kennedy: Man in Mustache
- Charles Avery: Man in Deerstalker's Cap
- Virginia Kirtley: Fatty's Girl

== See also ==
- List of American films of 1913
- Roscoe Arbuckle filmography
