= A Quiet Little Wedding =

1913 film

- Directed by: Wilfred Lucas
- Starring: Fatty Arbuckle
- Release date: October 23, 1913
- Country: United States
- Languages: Silent; English intertitles

A Quiet Little Wedding is a 1913 American short comedy film featuring Fatty Arbuckle. It features the earliest known film appearance of Arbuckle's wife, Minta Durfee.

== Plot ==
Fatty's wedding is interrupted by a rival, who instigates a lemon meringue pie fight and carries off Fatty's bride-to-be. The rival throws the bride off of a cliff, but she lands unhurt in Fatty's arms.

== Cast ==
The film's cast included:

- Roscoe "Fatty" Arbuckle: Fatty
- Minta Durfee: His Fiancée
- Charles Inslee: Rival
- Charles Avery: Minister
- Edgar Kennedy, Billy Gilbert, Rube Miller, Hank Mann, Bill Hauber, Peggy Pearce, Virginia Kirtley, Emma Clifton: Wedding Guests

== Production ==
In the 2010 book Mack Sennett's Fun Factory: A History and Filmography of His Studio, Brent E. Walker writes, "Contrary to previous secondary source speculation, Mack Sennett did not co-direct this film."

== See also ==
- List of American films of 1913
- Fatty Arbuckle filmography
