= Gentlemen of Nerve =

1914 film by Charlie Chaplin

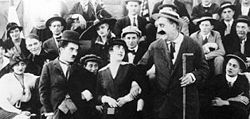
- Charlie Chaplin, Mabel Normand and Mack Swain in Gentlemen of Nerve
- Directed by: Charlie Chaplin
- Produced by: Mack Sennett
- Starring: Charlie Chaplin; Mabel Normand; Chester Conklin; Mack Swain; Phyllis Allen; Edgar Kennedy; Alice Davenport
- Cinematography: Frank D. Williams
- Production company: Keystone Studios
- Distributed by: Mutual Film
- Release date: October 29, 1914
- Running time: 16 minutes
- Country: United States
- Languages: Silent; English (Original titles)

Gentlemen of Nerve is a 1914 American comedy silent short film directed by Charlie Chaplin, starring Chaplin and Mabel Normand, and produced by Mack Sennett for Keystone Studios.

Gentlemen of Nerve

== Plot ==
Mabel and her beau go to an auto race and are joined by Charlie and his friend. As Charlie's friend is attempting to enter the raceway through a hole, the friend gets stuck and a policeman shows up.

== Cast ==
- Charlie Chaplin - Mr. Wow-Wow
- Mabel Normand - Mabel
- Chester Conklin - Mr. Walrus
- Mack Swain - Ambrose
- Phyllis Allen - Flirty woman
- Alice Davenport - Patron

== Reception ==
A reviewer from Bioscope wrote, "Charles Chaplin, as the very broke gentleman who is anxious to make love to all the pretty girls assembled to watch some daring motor-races, manages to obtain an abundance of humor out of every situation. It is just the type of film that audiences have grown to appreciate with great gusto."

Motion Picture News commented, "Charlie, Chester and Mabel attend an auto race. Results? As laughable as were ever pictured."

== See also ==
- List of American films of 1914
