= Phyllis Allen =

American actress, comedian and vaudeville (1861–1938)

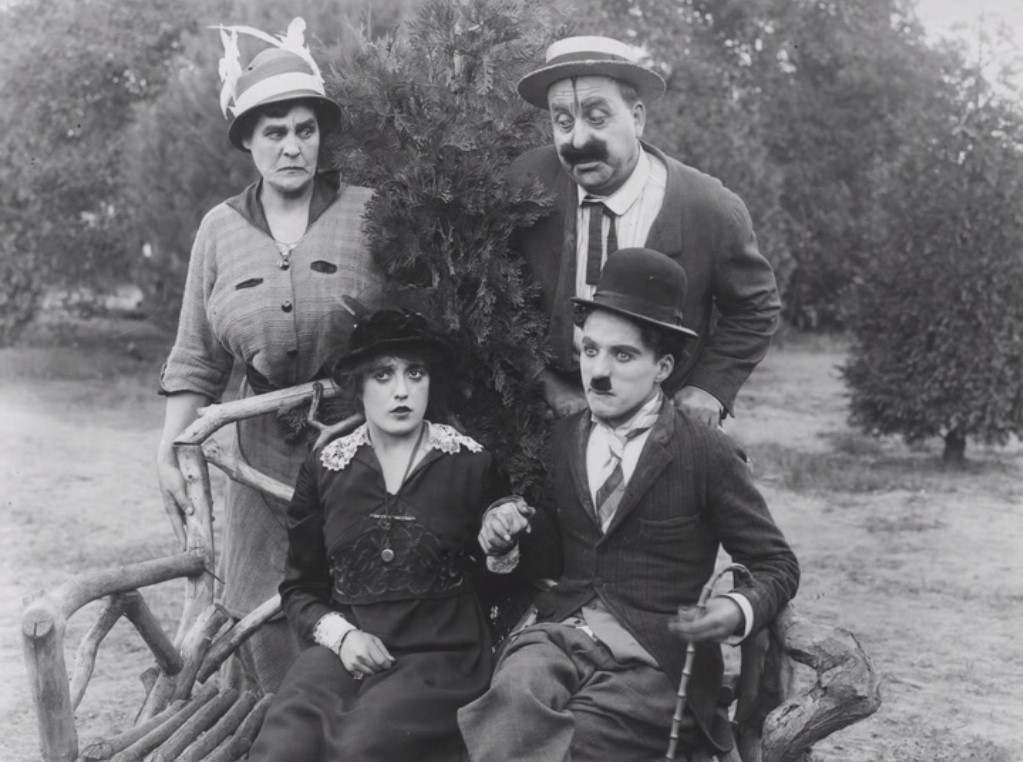
- Allen and Mack Swain (standing), Mabel Normand and Charlie Chaplin in Getting Acquainted (1914)
- Born: November 25, 1861; Richmond County, New York, U.S.
- Died: March 26, 1938 (aged 76); Los Angeles, California, U.S.
- Occupation(s): Actress, comedian, vaudevillian
- Years active: 1913–1923

Phyllis Allen (November 25, 1861 – March 26, 1938) was an American vaudeville and silent screen comedian. She worked with Charles Chaplin, Mabel Normand, Roscoe "Fatty" Arbuckle, and Mack Sennett during a film career spanning 74 movies in the decade between 1913 and 1923. Due to her imposing demeanour and perennially haughty expression, she was quite similar in appearance to fellow screen comedian Marie Dressler.

== Partial filmography ==
- Forced Bravery (1913)
- Murphy's I.O.U. (1913)
- Peeping Pete (1913)
- The Riot (1913)
- Mother's Boy (1913)
- Two Old Tars (1913)
- Fatty at San Diego (1913)
- Rebecca's Wedding Day (1914)
- A Robust Romeo (1914)
- A Busy Day (1914)
- Love and Bullets (1914)
- Caught in a Cabaret (1914)
- The Rounders (1914)
- Hello, Mabel (1914)
- Lover's Luck (1914)
- Gentlemen of Nerve (1914)
- His Trysting Place (1914)
- Getting Acquainted (1914)
- Leading Lizzie Astray (1914)
- Tillie's Punctured Romance (1914) (uncredited)
- That Little Band of Gold (1915)
- Fatty's Plucky Pup (1915)
- Fickle Fatty's Fall (1915)
- A Submarine Pirate (1915)
- A Night in the Show (1915)
- The Adventurer (1917)
- The Vagabond (1916)
- White Youth (1920)
- Pay Day (1922) with Charles Chaplin
- The Pilgrim (1923)
