= Getting Acquainted =

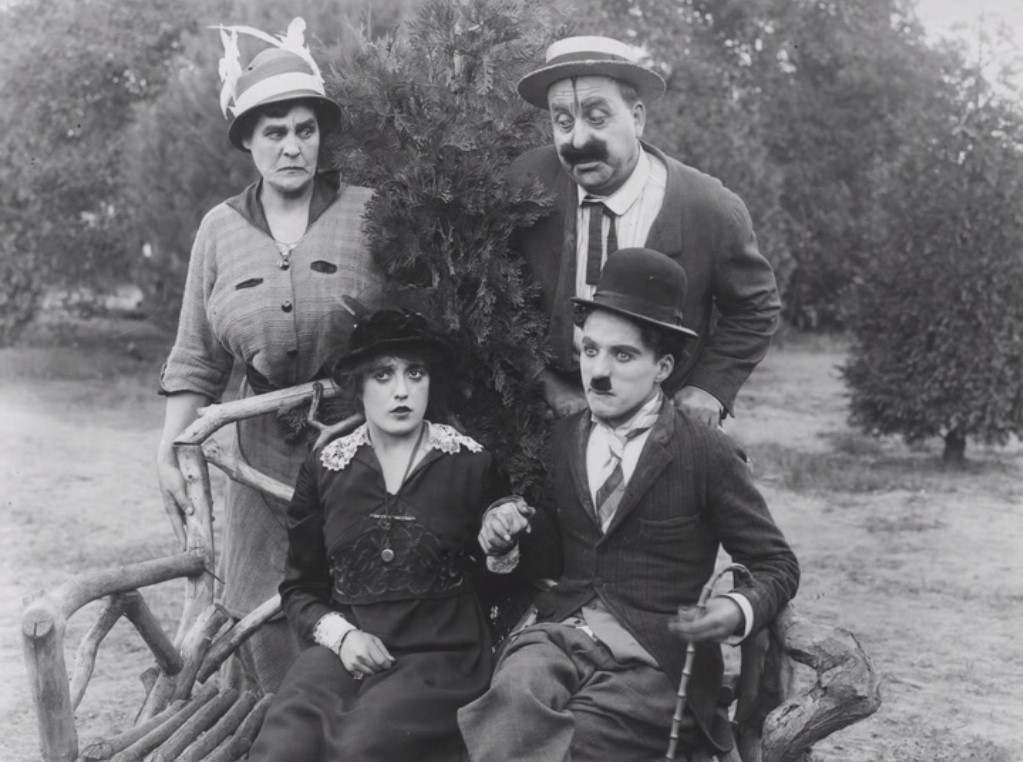
- Clockwise from top: Phyllis Allen, Mack Swain, Charlie Chaplin and Mabel Normand
- Directed by: Charlie Chaplin
- Written by: Charlie Chaplin
- Produced by: Mack Sennett
- Starring: Charlie Chaplin; Mabel Normand; Phyllis Allen; Mack Swain; Harry McCoy; Edgar Kennedy; Cecile Arnold
- Cinematography: Frank D. Williams
- Production company: Keystone Studios
- Distributed by: Mutual Film
- Release date: December 5, 1914
- Running time: 13 minutes
- Country: United States
- Languages: Silent film English (Original titles)

Getting Acquainted

Getting Acquainted, subsequently retitled A Fair Exchange, is a 1914 American comedy short silent film written and directed by Charlie Chaplin, starring Chaplin and Mabel Normand, and produced by Mack Sennett for Keystone Studios.

Released on December 5, 1914, Getting Acquainted was the next-to-last movie that Chaplin made for Keystone Studios. It marked the final time he appeared in the same film as Mabel Normand.

== Plot ==
In one of Chaplin's "park comedies" for Keystone Studios, Charlie and his domineering wife, Mrs. Sniffles, are walking in the greensward. When Mrs. Sniffles falls asleep on a park bench, Charlie takes the opportunity to walk away from her. He encounters pretty Mabel. At the moment, Mabel's husband, Ambrose, is occupied helping a stranger start his car. Charlie attempts to woo Mabel but is quickly rebuffed, and a park policeman comes to her aid. Meanwhile, Ambrose encounters Charlie's wife and is attracted to her. He, too, is rebuffed. Ambrose and Charlie both run afoul of a pretty blonde woman and her fez-wearing escort. A park policeman pursues both Charlie and Ambrose for their unwanted attentions directed at strange women. Charlie is eventually caught by the policeman, who brings him back to Mrs. Sniffles. She saves him from arrest and then begins to escort him home.

== Cast ==
- Charlie Chaplin - Mr. Sniffles
- Mabel Normand - Ambrose's wife
- Phyllis Allen - Mrs. Sniffles
- Mack Swain - Ambrose
- Harry McCoy - Flirt in park
- Edgar Kennedy - Policeman
- Cecile Arnold - Mary

== Reception ==
A reviewer from Motion Picture World wrote, "Mabel Normand, Charles Chaplin and the others are undeniably comical in this lively farce."

A reviewer from The Cinema declared, "Yet another fine Charles Chaplin number including the celebrated Mabel Normand."

== See also ==
- List of American films of 1914
