= Caught in the Rain (film) =

1914 film by Charlie Chaplin

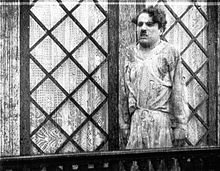
- Chaplin in a still from the film
- Directed by: Charlie Chaplin
- Written by: Charlie Chaplin (uncredited)
- Produced by: Mack Sennett
- Starring: Charlie Chaplin; Mack Swain; Alice Davenport; Alice Howell
- Cinematography: Frank D. Williams
- Production company: Keystone Studios
- Distributed by: Mutual Film
- Release date: May 4, 1914
- Running time: 16 minutes
- Country: United States
- Languages: Silent; English (original intertitles)

Caught in the Rain

Caught in the Rain is a 1914 American comedy short silent film starring Charlie Chaplin. This film was the first of many movies in which Chaplin both directed and played the lead. The short film was produced by Mack Sennett for Keystone Studios with a running time of 16 minutes.

== Plot ==
The action starts in a park, where a man is trying to romance a matronly woman, wearing a fur stole.

The man leaves to go to a concession stall, Cornucopias, and Charlie comes along in his infamous tramp costume and tries to give her a rose. He makes the woman laugh by almost soaking himself at the drinking fountain. He then sits next to her on the bench. The original man returns and is angry. He grabs Charlie by the face. He argues with the woman, waving his arms around and hitting Charlie with each movement. His last swing knocks Charlie clean over the bench. They leave and return to a hotel.

Charlie is despondent. He leaves the park and goes to a bar. He meets a policeman outside. He staggers, now apparently drunk, over a wide road, almost getting hit by a car. He arrives at the same hotel and after propositioning a girl outside, enters, falling over a man's gout-bound leg at the reception desk. He checks the register to see which room the couple are in, who are meanwhile getting drunk themselves. Rushing up the stairs he slips, and slides comically back to the foot on his stomach. He makes several more dangerously balanced comical attempts, hitting the gout-bound man and his two female friends in the process.

He approaches the hotel room, where the original couple are arguing. His key doesn't fit but the door is open and he enters, at first not seeing the couple due to his drunken state. The man boots him out. Charlie tries another room and gets in. He starts to undress and goes to bed.

Meanwhile, the man across the hall leaves his wife to go out. We are told she is a sleepwalker. She crosses the hall to sit on Charlie's bed. However the rain starts and the husband returns to the hotel to find his room empty. Charlie, now awake meets him at his door and claims not to know where his wife is. While the man goes down to reception, Charlie takes her back to her room but gets trapped when the man returns. He ends up on the balcony in the rain. But then a policeman spots him and challenges him, firing a gun. Enter the Keystone Cops. A comic battle ensues in the hallway. The husband ends up in Charlie's room and collapses drunk on the bed. The cops disappear. The wife comes into the hall and she and Charlie fall down drunk on the floor.

== Cast ==
- Charlie Chaplin - Tipsy hotel guest
- Mack Swain - Husband
- Alice Davenport - Wife
- Alice Howell - Hotel guest

== Production ==
By late April 1914, Chaplin had been at Keystone Studios for four months. In that short time, Chaplin had grown from knowing absolutely nothing about movie-making to trying his hand at directing one of his own short comedies. According to Mack Sennett's biography, many of the usual Keystone directors assembled to watch a private screening of Caught in the Rain. They arrived expecting to see an inferior comedy but instead they were all impressed by Chaplin's maiden effort at directing and applauded enthusiastically when the movie ended.

== Reception ==
A reviewer from Bioscope wrote, "Chaplin flirts with a married lady and gets into much trouble. The climax comes when he takes part in a comical sleepwalking scene at the hotel. His explanations cause a riotous finale."

== See also ==
- List of American films of 1914
