= Alice Davenport =

American actress (1864–1936)

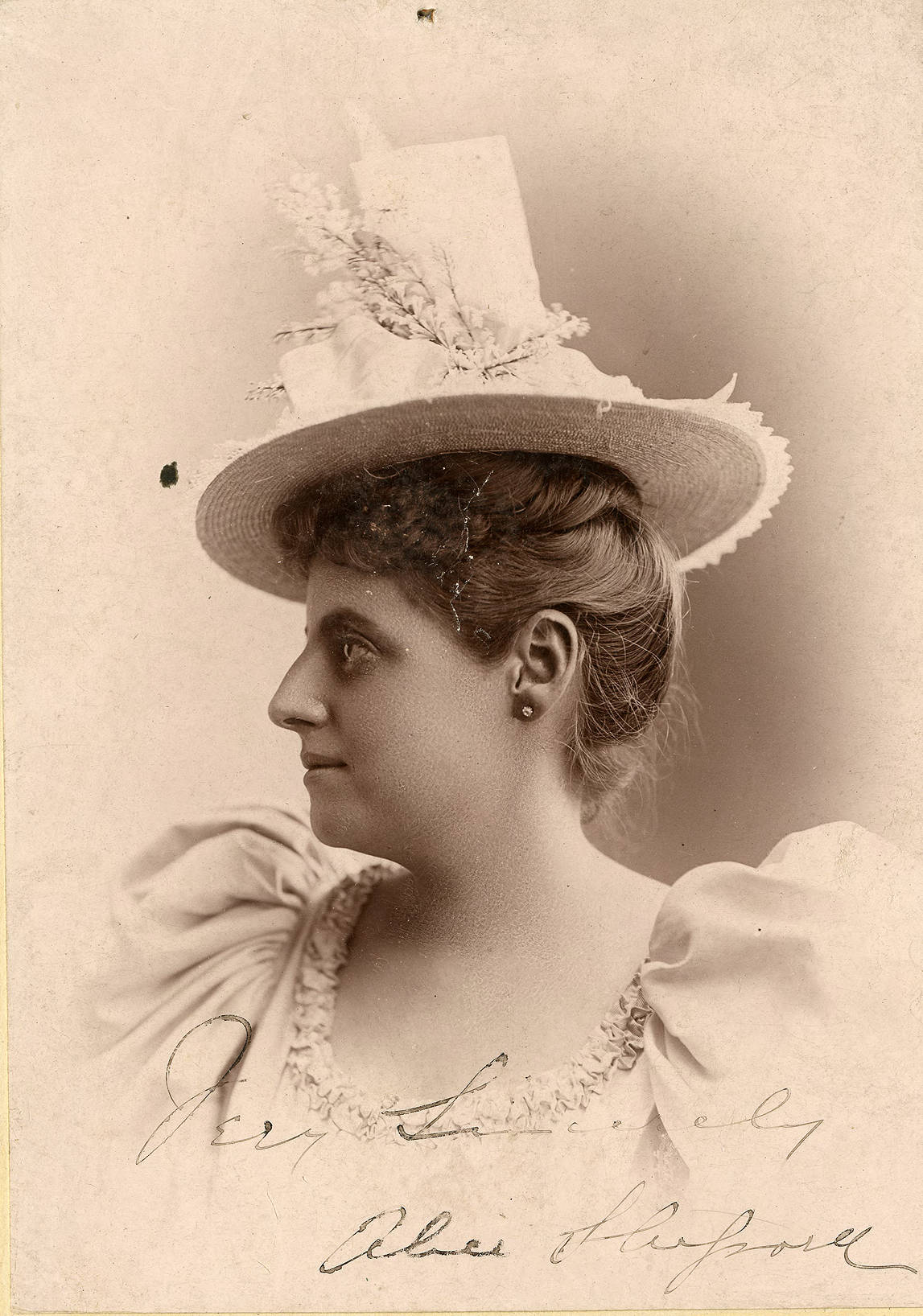
- Davenport in 1891
- Born: Alice Shepphard; February 29, 1864; New York City, New York, US
- Died: June 24, 1936 (aged 72); Los Angeles, California, US
- Occupation: Actress
- Years active: 1911-1930
- Spouses: Harry Davenport (m. 1893; div. 1896) Edwin H. Morse (died 1936)
- Children: Dorothy Davenport

Alice Davenport (née Shepphard; February 29, 1864 – June 24, 1936) was an American film actress. She appeared in 140 films from 1911 to 1930.

She was born Alice Shepphard in New York City, and died in Los Angeles. She made her stage debut at age 5. Davenport married silent actor, director, and talkie character actor Harry Davenport. They divorced in 1896. Actress Dorothy Davenport was their daughter. She married, secondly, to Edwin H. Morse.

== Selected filmography ==
- At It Again (1912)
- That Ragtime Band (1913)
- Passions, He Had Three (1913)
- The Telltale Light (1913)
- The Riot (1913)
- Mabel's Dramatic Career (1913)
- Mother's Boy (1913)
- A Quiet Little Wedding (1913)
- A Ride for a Bride (1913)
- Some Nerve (1913)
- He Would a Hunting Go (1913)
- The Under-Sheriff (1914)
- A Robust Romeo (1914)
- Making a Living (1914)
- Mabel's Strange Predicament (1914)
- The Star Boarder (1914)
- Caught in a Cabaret (1914)
- Caught in the Rain (1914)
- The Property Man (1914)
- Gentlemen of Nerve (1914)
- Fatty's Wine Party (1914)
- The Sea Nymphs (1914)
- Tillie's Punctured Romance (1914) as Guest
- Mabel and Fatty's Married Life (1915)
- Rum and Wall Paper (1915)
- Mabel and Fatty's Wash Day (1915)
- Mabel, Fatty and the Law (1915)
- That Little Band of Gold (1915)
- Wished on Mabel (1915)
- Mabel's Wilful Way (1915)
- Fickle Fatty's Fall (1915)
- Fatty and the Broadway Stars (1915)
- Ramona (1916)
- Luke Wins Ye Ladye Faire (1917)
- Little Red Decides (1918)
- Spotlight Sadie (1919)
- Skirts (1921)
- Oh, Mabel Behave (1922)
- The Show (1922)
- The Legend of Hollywood (1924)
- Unmarried Wives (1924)
