= Mack Swain =

American actor (1876–1935)

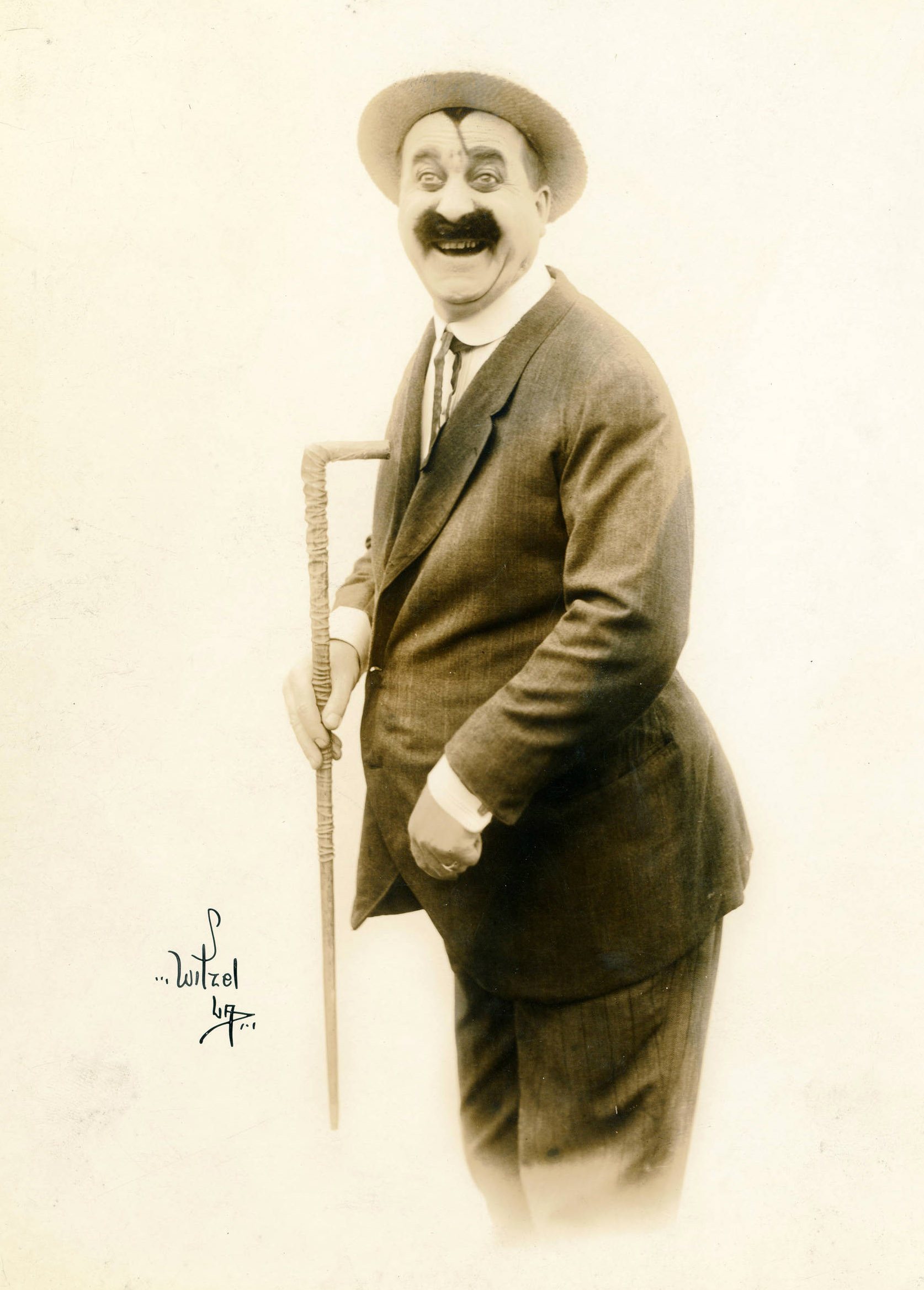
- Photograph by Albert Witzel, 1920
- Born: Moroni Swain; February 16, 1876; Salt Lake City, Utah, U.S.
- Died: August 25, 1935 (aged 59); Tacoma, Washington, U.S.
- Occupations: Actor, vaudevillian
- Years active: 1913-1935
- Spouse: Cora Claire King (m. 1899)

Mack Swain (born Moroni Swain; February 16, 1876 – August 25, 1935) was a prolific early American film actor, who appeared in many of Mack Sennett’s comedies at Keystone Studios, including the Keystone Cops series. He also appeared in major features by Charlie Chaplin and starred in both the world's first feature length comedy and first film to feature a "movie-within-a-movie" premise.

== Early years ==
A Movie Star (1916)

Swain was born on February 16, 1876, to Robert Henry Swain and Mary Ingeborg Jensen in Salt Lake City, Utah, and was educated in Salt Lake City's public schools. At age 6 he put on his first act called "Mack Swain's Mammoth Minstrels" in the family barn. At age 8 he stole all of his mother's sheets and linens to build his own circus tent. He ran away from home at age 15, joining a minstrel show. His mother took him home after one performance, but he persuaded her to let him continue in entertainment.

== Career ==
In the early 1900s, Swain had his own stock theater company, the Mack Swain Co., which performed in the western and midwestern United States. His most notable residency, was in Santa Cruz, California, where at one point he was bringing in 6,000 patrons a week to see his performances; over two-thirds the population of the city at the time. On June 24, 1907, the Mack Swain Co. had its 61st show in 50 days, breaking the record by any theater company ever appearing in Santa Cruz. That same year Swain bought the Alisky Theatre, and changed its name to Swain’s Theatre. By 1913, audience attendance had begun to dry up and with it Swain's theatrical career. Mack was initially hesitant to work in the film industry, viewing it as an "inferior art form to theater," but eventually gave in after many of his fellow actors and peers had done the same.

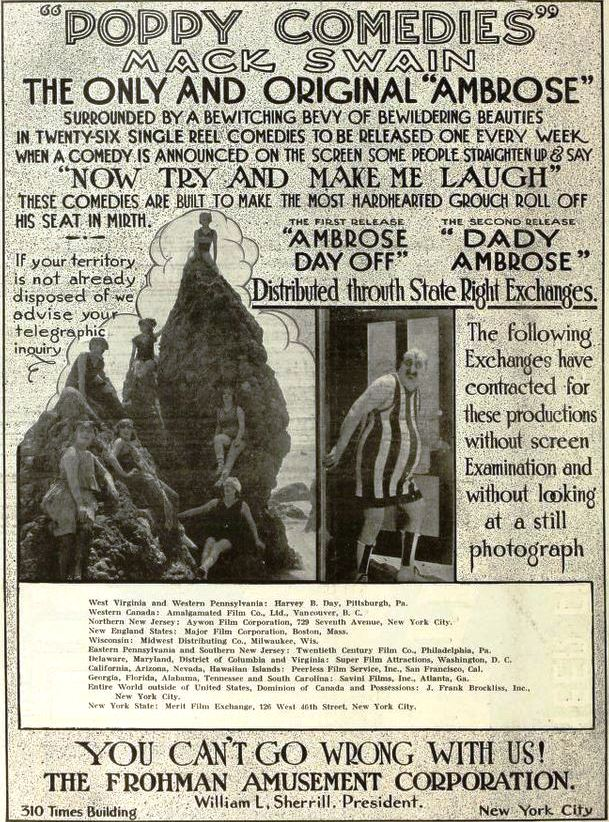
Advertisement for comedy films starring Swain in Frohman Amusement Corp productions

His first foray into silent film began at Keystone Studios under Mack Sennett. His first dressing room was shared with Roscoe "Fatty" Arbuckle. Shortly after arriving at Keystone, Charlie Chaplin too joined the studio and the two quickly teamed up. Swain would later recall that Sennett initially saw him and Chaplin as a burden, and encouraged the two to work together. These early films, such as Laughing Gas (1914) and Mabel's Married Life (1914), would forge a friendship between the two that would endure until Swain's death. Chaplin would later state that his idea for his infamous character, The Tramp, came from him rummaging through Swain's and Arbuckle's dressing room; the baggy clothes from Arbuckle and the iconic mustache from one of Swain's own fake mustaches. Swain and Chaplin would eventually star in the world's first feature-length comedy, Tillie's Punctured Romance (1914).

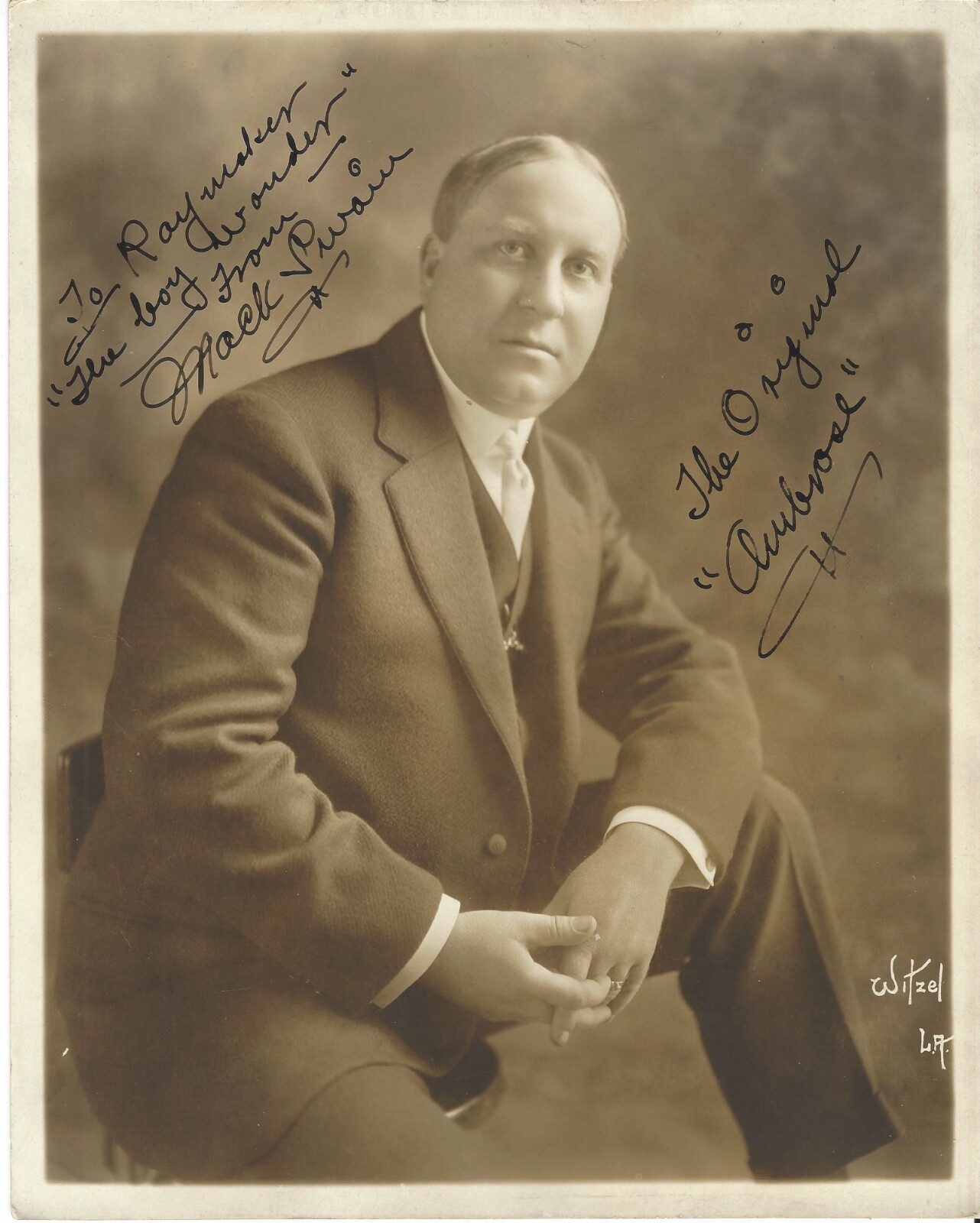
Inscribed Witzel Photo

Chaplin soon left Keystone, and Swain paired up with Chester Conklin to make a series of comedy films. Swain played "Ambrose" and Conklin the grand mustachioed "Walrus" in several films, including The Battle of Ambrose and Walrus and Love, Speed and Thrills, both made in 1915. Besides these comedies, the two appeared together in a variety of other films, 26 all told including some early sound shorts. They also appeared separately and/or together in films starring Mabel Normand, Charles Chaplin, Roscoe Arbuckle and most of the rest of the roster of Keystone players. Swain later took his Ambrose character with him to the L-KO Kompany.

Having already worked with Charles Chaplin at Keystone, Swain began working with Chaplin again at First National in 1921, appearing in The Idle Class, Pay Day, and The Pilgrim. He is also remembered for his large supporting role as Big Jim McKay in the 1925 film The Gold Rush, for United Artists, written by and starring Chaplin.

== Personal life ==
Swain was married to actress Cora King. He was a lifelong member of The Church of Jesus Christ of Latter-Day Saints.

== Death ==
Swain died on a train bound from Chicago to Hollywood in August 25, 1935, following an illness that lasted only a few hours. He was buried in Tacoma, Washington.

== Legacy ==
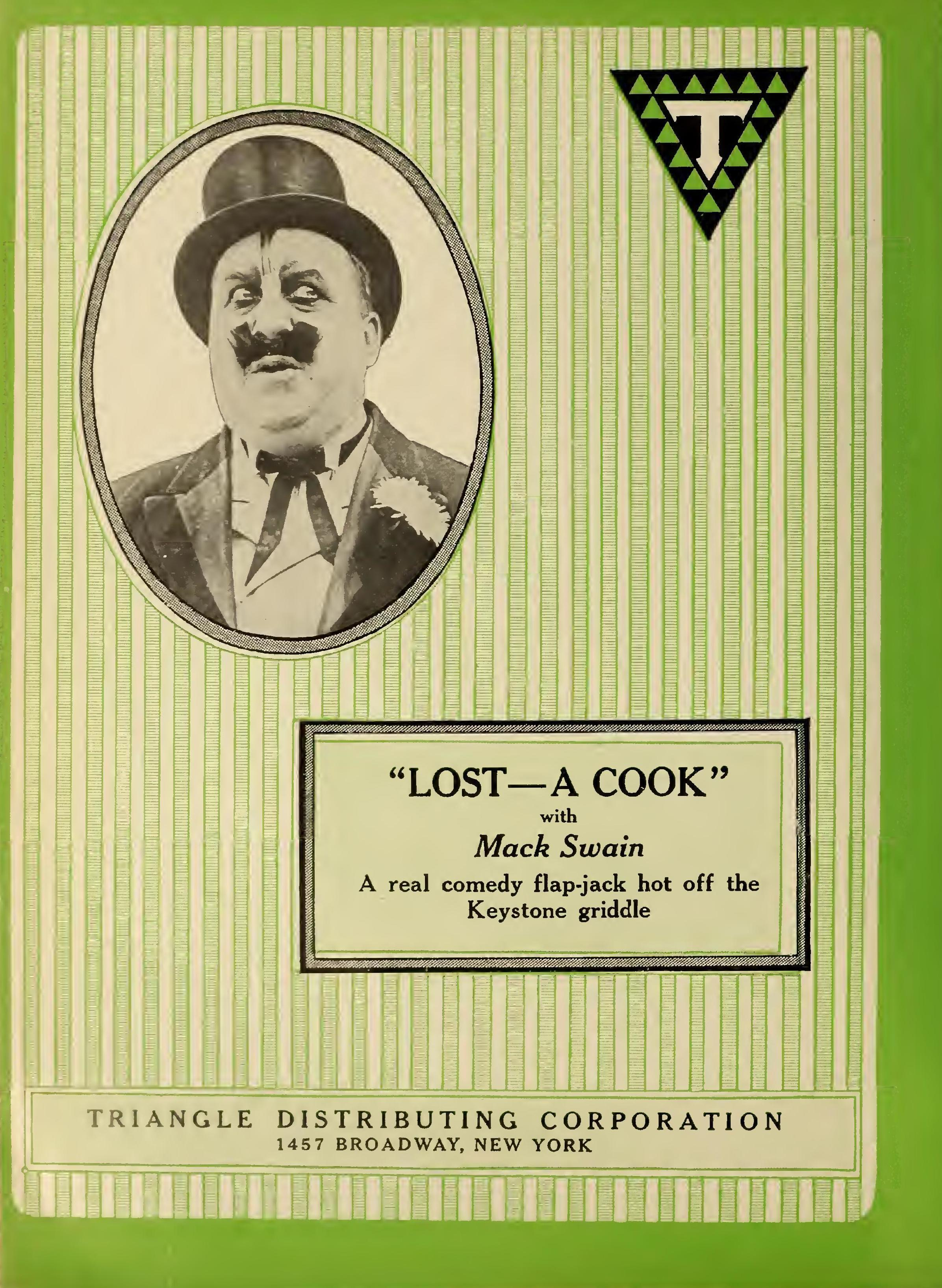
Lost – A Cook promotion in Motion Picture News, 1917

For his contribution to the motion picture industry, Swain received a star on the Hollywood Walk of Fame, at 1500 Vine Street.

== Partial filmography ==
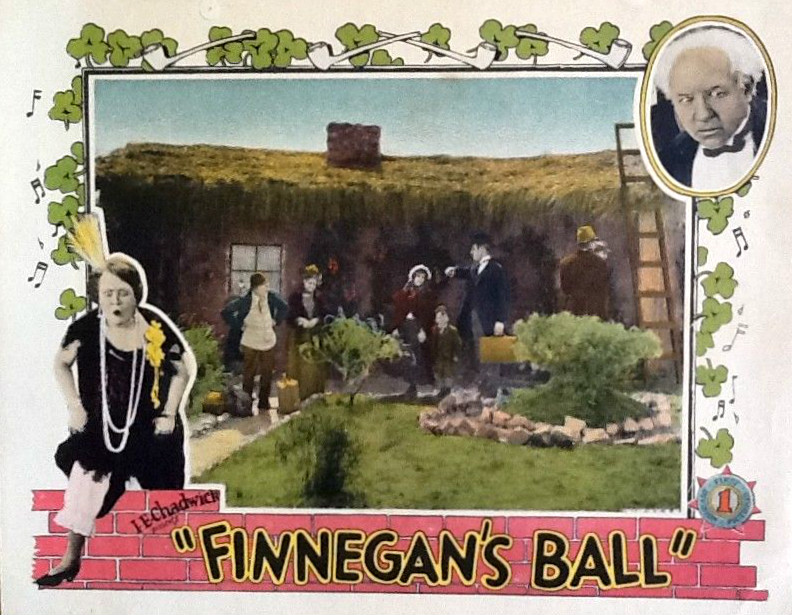
Lobby card for Finnegan's Ball (1927)

Year	Title	Role	Notes
1914	A False Beauty	The Policeman	
1914	Caught in the Rain	Husband	Short
1914	His Musical Career	Mike aka Ambrose - Tom's Partner	Short
1914	Tillie's Punctured Romance	John Banks	
1914	Getting Acquainted	Ambrose	Short
1915	Love, Speed and Thrills	Ambrose	Short
1916	A Movie Star	Handsome Jack	Short
1916	His Bitter Pill	Jim - A Sheriff	Short
1917	Lost- A Cook	Cook	
1921	The Idle Class	Edna's Father	Short, Uncredited
1922	Pay Day	Foreman	Short
1923	The Pilgrim	Deacon Jones	
1925	The Gold Rush	Big Jim McKay	
1925	The Eagle	Innkeeper	Uncredited
1926	Hands Up!	Silas Woodstock	
1926	Torrent	Don Matías	
1926	Sea Horses	Bimbo-Bomba	
1926	The Cohens and Kellys	Minor Role	Uncredited
1926	Kiki	Pastryman	
1926	Footloose Widows	Ludwig, Marian's husband-in-retrospect	
1926	Honesty – The Best Policy	Bendy Joe	
1926	The Nervous Wreck	Jerome Underwood	
1926	Her Big Night	Myers	
1926	Whispering Wires	McCarthy	
1927	The Beloved Rogue	Nicholas	
1927	See You in Jail	Slossom	
1927	The Shamrock and the Rose	Mr. Kelly	
1927	The Tired Business Man	Mike Murphy	
1927	Mockery	Vladimir Gaidaroff	
1927	Finnegan's Ball	Patrick Flannigan	
1927	My Best Girl	The Judge	
1927	Becky	Irving Spiegelberg	
1927	A Texas Steer	Bragg	
1927	The Girl from Everywhere	Wilfred Ashcraft - Director	
1928	Gentlemen Prefer Blondes	Sir Francis Beekman	
1928	Tillie's Punctured Romance	Tillie's Father	
1928	Caught in the Fog	Detective Ryan	
1928	The Last Warning	Robert Bunce	
1929	The Cohens and the Kellys in Atlantic City	Mr. Tom Kelly	
1929	The Locked Door	Hotel Proprietor	
1929	Marianne	General	
1930	Redemption	Magistrate	
1930	The Sea Bat	Dutchy	
1930	Soup to Nuts	First Fat Diner	Uncredited
1931	Finn and Hattie	Le Bottin	
1932	The Midnight Patrol		
1935	Bad Boy	Man on Rowing Machine	Uncredited (final film role)

== Images ==
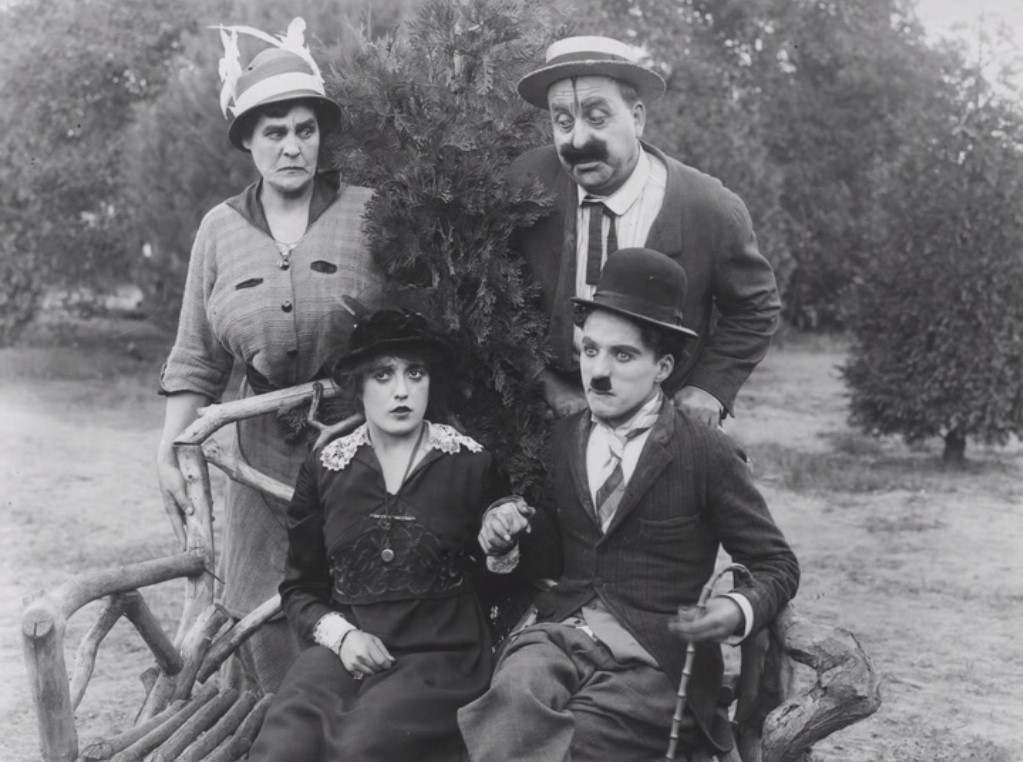
Clockwise from top: Phyllis Allen, Mack Swain, Charles Chaplin and Mabel Normand in Getting Acquainted (1914)

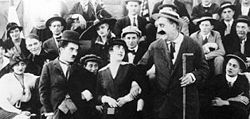
With Charles Chaplin and Mabel Normand in Gentlemen of Nerve (1914)
