= The Face on the Barroom Floor =

The Face on the Barroom Floor may refer to:

- "The Face on the Barroom Floor" (poem), an 1887 poem by Hugh Antoine d'Arcy
- The Face on the Bar Room Floor (1914 film), a film starring Charlie Chaplin, adapted from the poem
- The Face on the Bar-Room Floor (1923 film), a film directed by John Ford, adapted from the poem
- The Face on the Bar Room Floor (1932 film), a film directed by Bertram Bracken
- The Face on the Barroom Floor (painting), a 1936 painting on the floor of the Teller House Bar in Central City, Colorado, U.S., inspired by the poem
- The Face on the Barroom Floor (opera), an opera by Henry Mollicone, inspired by the painting
- "The Face on the Barroom Floor" (1946), a Nelson Algren story in The Neon Wilderness
