= George Burton (actor) =

American actor

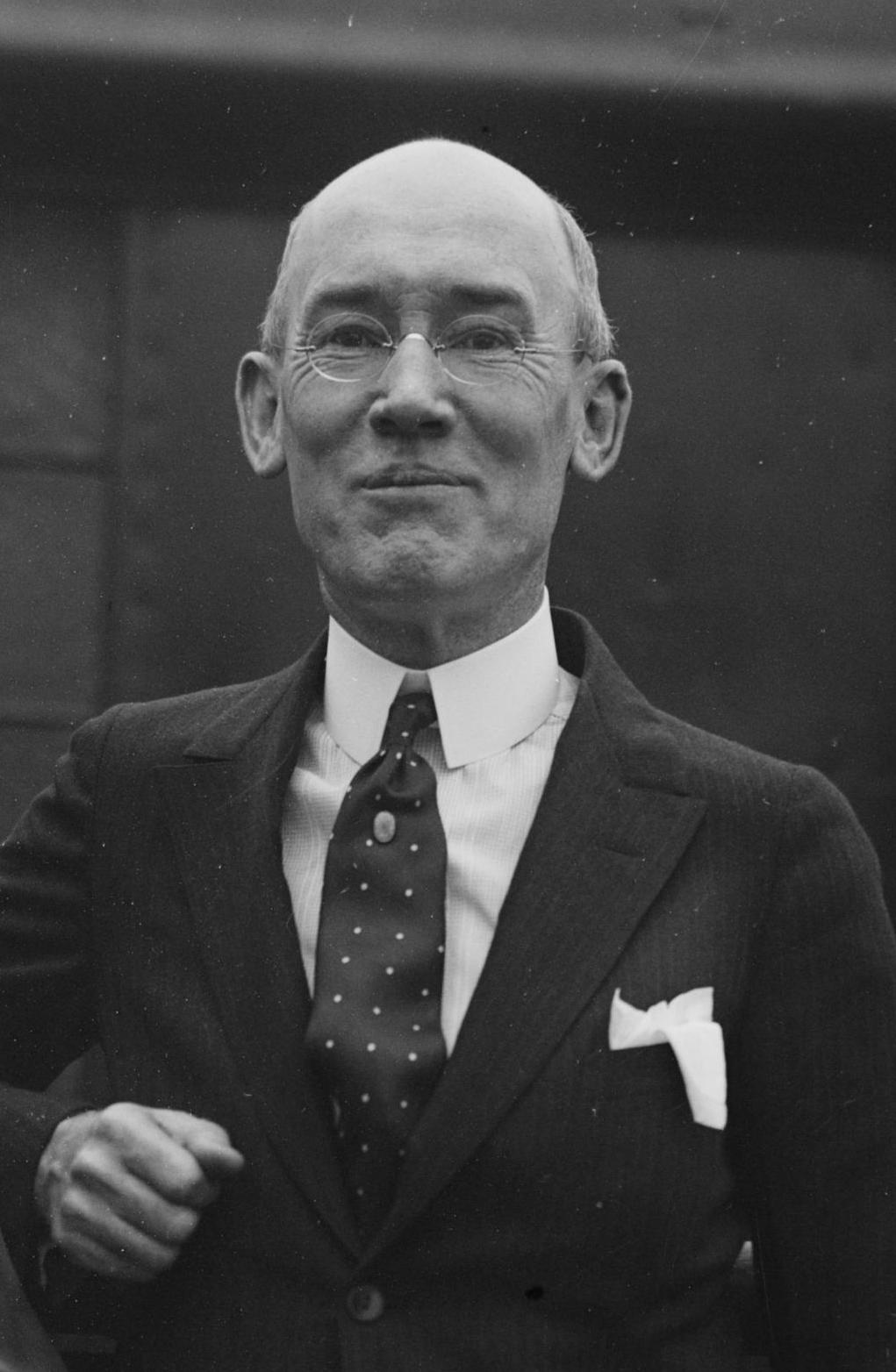
- Born: September 17, 1898; Butte, Montana
- Died: December 8, 1955 (aged 57); Los Angeles, California
- Occupation: Film actor

George Burton (17 September 1898 in Butte, Montana – 8 December 1955 in Los Angeles, California) was an American silent film actor.

== Filmography ==
- Men Without Souls (1940) (uncredited) .... Guard
- Dick Tracy's G-Men (1939) (uncredited)
- When Tomorrow Comes (1939) (uncredited) .... Bus Boy
- Union Pacific (1939) (uncredited) .... Laborer
- The Lone Ranger Rides Again (1939) (uncredited) .... Ed Powers
- Wells Fargo (1937) (uncredited) .... Bit
- Double or Nothing (1937) (uncredited) .... Ticket Taker
- Come on, Cowboys (1937) .... Sheriff
- You Only Live Once (1937) (uncredited) .... Convict waiter
- The Mysterious Avenger (1936) (uncredited) .... Texas Ranger
- Coronado (1935)
- Here Comes Cookie (1935) (uncredited) .... Iceman
- Tumbling Tumbleweeds (1935) (uncredited) .... Sheriff Manley
- The Miracle Rider (1935) .... Mort, Janss Hand
- Ruggles of Red Gap (1935) (uncredited) .... Doc Squires
- Law Beyond the Range (1935) (uncredited) .... Ranger Tex Boyle
- In Old Santa Fe (1934) .... Henchman Red
- Smoke Lightning (1933) (uncredited) .... Jordan
- The Rainbow Trail (1932) (uncredited) .... Elliott
- The Painted Desert (1931) (uncredited) .... Santa Fe
- Buying a Gun (1929)
- Blake of Scotland Yard (1927) (uncredited) .... Henchman
- Jail Birdies (1927)
- Shell Socked (1926)
- Wild West (1925) .... Dan Norton
- Idaho (1925)
- Getting Gertie's Goat (1924)
- Busy Buddies (1924)
- Black and Blue (1923)
- Jiggs in Society (1920)
- The Little Boy Scout (1917) .... Luis Alvarez
