= Almost a Husband =

1919 film by Clarence G. Badger

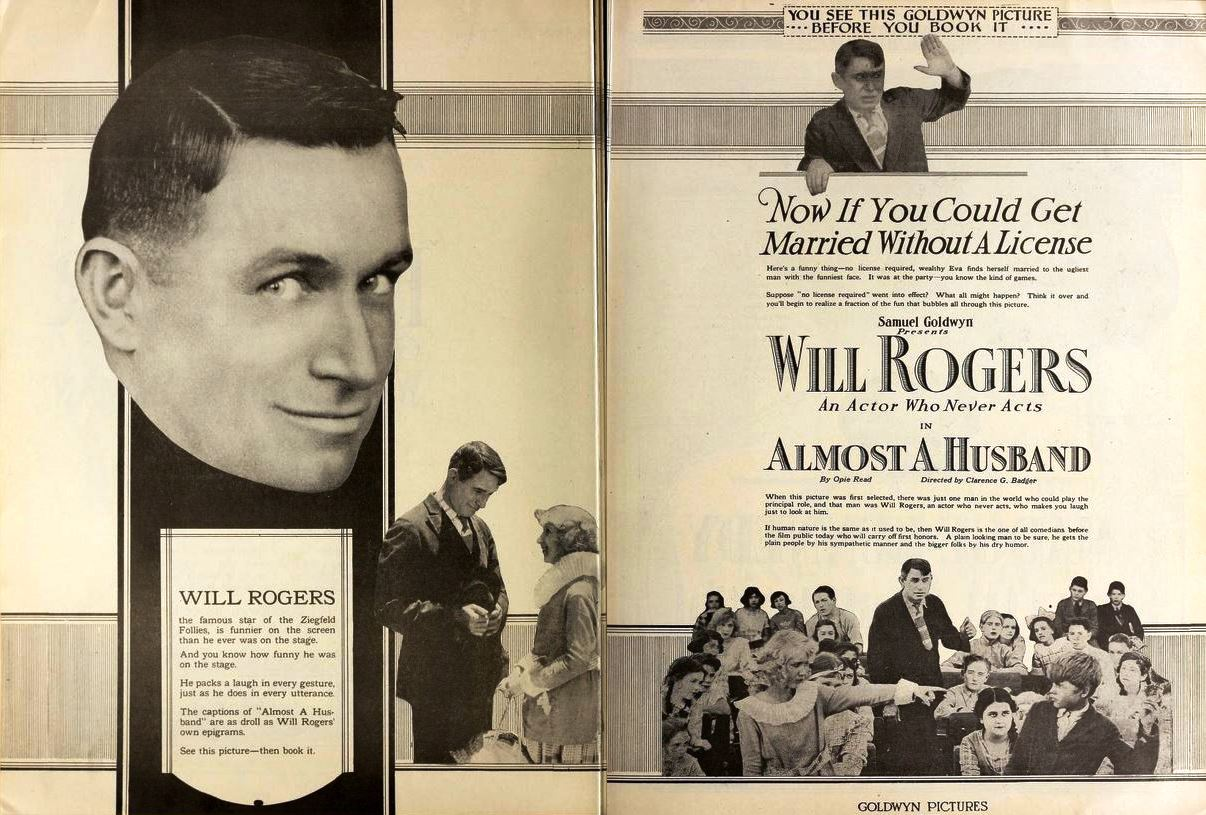
- Advertisement
- Directed by: Clarence G. Badger
- Written by: Robert F. Hill
- Based on: Old Ebenezer by Opie Read
- Produced by: Samuel Goldwyn
- Starring: Will Rogers; Peggy Wood; Herbert Standing; Cullen Landis; Clara Horton; Ed Brady
- Cinematography: Norbert Brodine; Marcel Le Picard
- Production company: Goldwyn Pictures
- Distributed by: Goldwyn Pictures
- Release date: October 12, 1919
- Running time: 50 minutes
- Country: United States
- Language: Silent (English intertitles)

Almost a Husband is a lost 1919 American comedy film directed by Clarence G. Badger and written by Robert F. Hill. It is based on the 1897 novel Old Ebenezer by Opie Read. The film stars Will Rogers, Peggy Wood, Herbert Standing, Cullen Landis, Clara Horton, and Ed Brady. The film was released on October 12, 1919, by Goldwyn Pictures.

== Plot ==
A New England schoolteacher moves to a small Southern town and comes to the aid of many local people, including a young woman who faces unwanted romantic advances from another man. He pretends to marry the woman, but their marriage ends up being real.

== Cast ==
- Will Rogers as Sam Lyman
- Peggy Wood as Eva McElwyn
- Herbert Standing as Banker McElwyn
- Cullen Landis as Jerry Wilson
- Clara Horton as Jane Sheldon
- Ed Brady as Zeb Sawyer
- Sidney De Gray as John Carruthers
- Gus Saville as Jasper Stagg
- Guinn "Big Boy" Williams (*uncredited)
- Mary Jane Irving (*uncredited)
