= Herndon Davis =

American artist

Herndon Davis (1901–1962) was an American artist, journalist, illustrator, and painter. He worked at the National War College in Washington, D.C., creating maps of China and Japan. Davis was an illustrator for New York, Washington, D.C., and Denver newspapers. He was also commissioned to make paintings and murals.

He moved to Denver in 1936, where his paintings captured notable people and landmarks of Denver and the west. "In some cases Davis provides the only extant image of certain people and places. In hundreds of colorful paintings and drawings he adds impressively to our portrait gallery," according to James X. Kroll, Manager, Western History and Genealogy Department of the Denver Public Library, where many of Davis works are exhibited.

His subjects ranged from notorious prostitutes, like Ella "Cattle Kate" Watson, to Governor Ralph Lawrence Carr. Davis made paintings of houses and mansions, like that owned by William Byers. He also captured the stately Tabor Grand Opera House and buildings that had significantly changed over time. Davis created a painting of an art gallery that used to be a brothel and another of a "shabby" apartment building that has been an elegant hotel. He painted The Face on the Barroom Floor, depicting his wife, on the bar room floor of Teller House in Central City.

== Early life ==
Herndon Davis was in Wynnewood, Oklahoma, born in 1901. His parents were ranchers. The family moved often. Davis moved to Kansas City, Missouri, when he was fourteen to take art lessons, which he supported by taking unskilled jobs. He then moved to Chicago and worked as an apprentice to an engraver and as a commercial artist.

== Career ==
=== Early career ===
He joined the army and was stationed in Denver in 1920 before being transferred to work on maps of China and Japan at the War College in Washington, D.C. Davis attended Yale briefly. He then moved to New York where he attended the National Academy of Design and Art Students League of New York. Davis lived in Greenwich Village. He was employed by the New York Herald Tribune, Washington Times-Herald and Washington Daily News.

=== Denver journalist and muralist ===
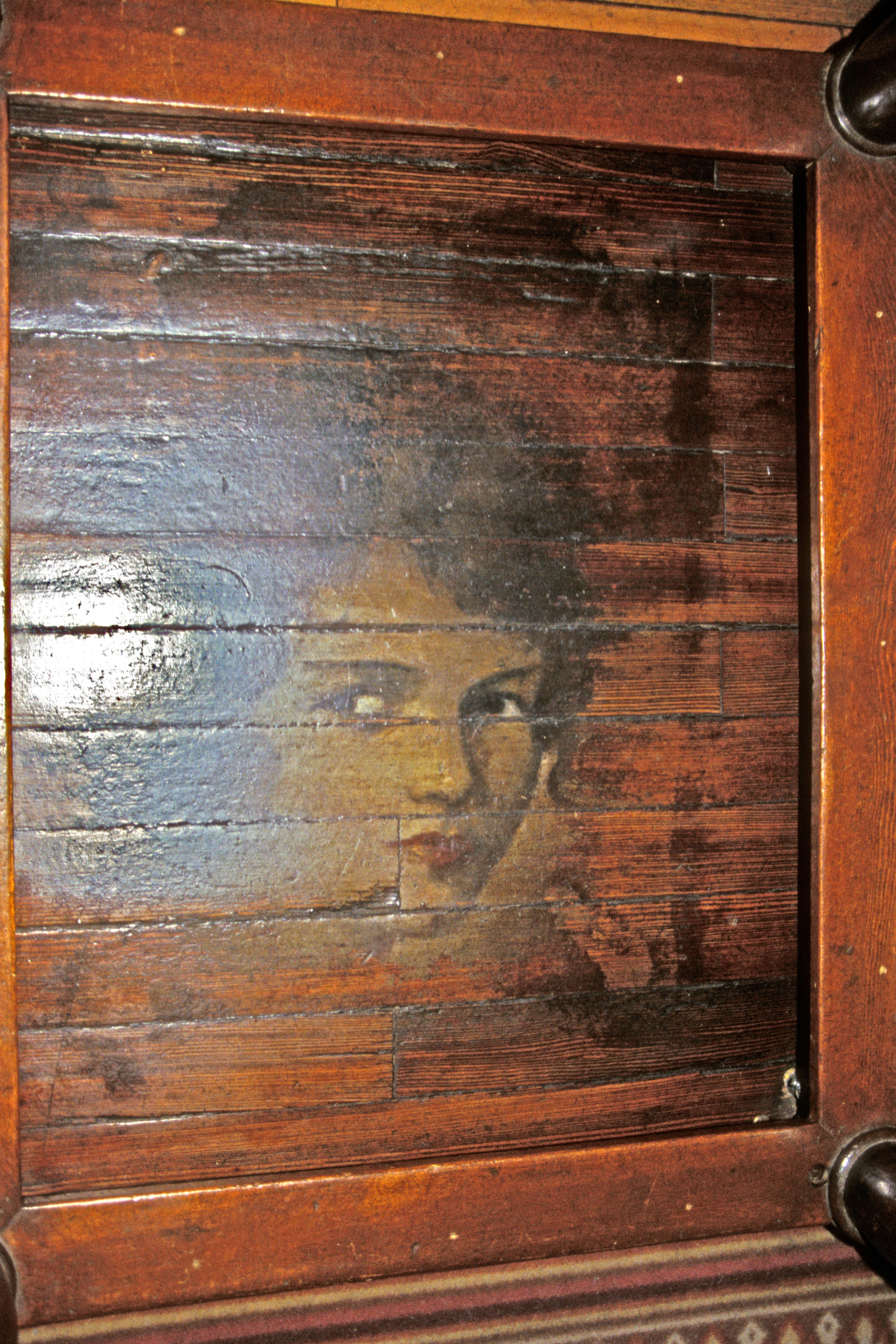
The Face on the Barroom Floor

Davis worked for The Denver Post and the Rocky Mountain News, beginning in 1936. He was also commissioned to paint murals, such as a scene of Denver newspaper staff painted in the Denver Press Club card room and a mural in the tearoom of the Denver Dry Goods store. He painted a mural for the La Caverna Hotel in Eddy County, New Mexico. (Note: The mural for the La Caverna Hotel resided there for 50 years until the hotel was totally razed in 1990. It was then moved to the public library in Carlsbad, New Mexico and then to the Pecos River Conference Center, where it resides as of January 2011.)

=== The Face ===
Davis was commissioned by the Central City Opera Association to paint a series of paintings for the Central City Opera House; he was also requested to do some work at the Teller House in Central City. While staying at Teller House, and on a whim, he painted The Face on the Barroom Floor. The mural painted on the floor of the hotel's bar, now named The Face, was confirmed to be his wife after her death. It is thought to have been inspired by the poem The Face upon the Barroom Floor by Hugh Antoine d'Arcy. That episode led to the artist and journalist being called “that drunk who painted the face on the barroom floor”, according to authors Tom Noel and Craig Leavitt.

=== Notable people and places ===
The Herndon Davis Collection in our Western History and Genealogy Department is one of our most prized treasures. Anyone dealing with major characters and/or notable buildings in Colorado should check into Davis’s portraits and paintings of notable sites. In some cases Davis provides the only extant image of certain people and places. In hundreds of colorful paintings and drawings he adds impressively to our portrait gallery.

— James X. Kroll, Manager, Western History and Genealogy Department, Denver Public Library

Some of his paintings of notable people and places, like the painting of Dr. Frederick J. Bancroft's farmhouse made in 1941, are displayed at the Western History section of the Denver Public Library. The book Herndon Davis: Painting Colorado History, 1901–1962 was released in conjunction of an exhibition of his work at the Denver Public Library. There was also an exhibit, in conjunction with the book, in 2016 at the Denver Art Museum. Among the notable subjects of his portraits were Governor Ralph Lawrence Carr, actress Katharine Hepburn, Mother Cabrini, and Emily Griffith. Davis painted a portrait of Josiah Gregg (1806–1850) between 1950 and 1962, which is in the collection of Palace of the Governors, a New Mexico History Museum. He also painted santos.

Davis created a wash drawing of the notorious House of Mirrors brothel, that later became a Buddhist temple. It was used as an illustration in Caroline Bancroft's Six Racy Madams of Colorado. His illustration of Ella "Cattle Kate" Watson was used for Red Light Women of the Rocky Mountain by Jan MacKell.

Davis captured images of Denver's landmarks, generally in watercolor, some of which no longer exist. The captured what Thomas Noel said many thought to be "the finest building ever done in Denver," the Tabor Grand Opera House, in its glory. He also captured realistic images of landmarks as they had transitioned over the years. Now a gallery of western art, the Navarre building across from the Brown Palace Hotel had been a brothel. Once considered the "Delmonico of the West" the Charpiot's Hotel had become a "shabby apartment building with seedy storefronts with old cars lined up in front of it." He captured the "tattered" nature of what had once been the "elegant" Arcade Saloon, a gambling hall located on Larimer. Other places that Davis captured were the Palace Variety Theatre and Grayson's store and other 16th buildings in Eugene Field Alley. The Rocky Mountain News published an article, with commentary provided by Joe Emerson Smith, in the 1940s about his paintings of landmarks. He captured homes, too, like the mansions of William Byers and Ed Chase.

== Personal life and death ==
Davis met Edna Juanita (Nita) Cotter in 1928. Cotter, who was eleven years older than Davis, was to become his wife.

Herndon was commissioned to create a mural for the Smithsonian Institution, which he began work on, when he died of a heart attack in 1962. He is buried in Fort Logan National Cemetery.
