= Come On, Cowboys =

1937 film by Joseph Kane

- Theatrical release poster
- Directed by: Joseph Kane
- Screenplay by: Betty Burbridge
- Based on: characters by William Colt MacDonald
- Produced by: Sol C. Siegel (associate producer)
- Starring: Robert Livingston
- Cinematography: Ernest Miller
- Edited by: Lester Orlebeck
- Distributed by: Republic Pictures
- Release date: May 24, 1937
- Running time: 58 minutes 53 minutes (American edited version)
- Country: United States
- Language: English

Come On, Cowboys is a 1937 American Western "Three Mesquiteers" B-movie directed by Joseph Kane.

== Cast ==
- Robert Livingston as Stony Brooke
- Ray Corrigan as Tucson Smith
- Max Terhune as Lullaby Joslin
- Maxine Doyle as Ellen Reed
- Willie Fung as Fong
- Edward Peil Jr. as Thomas Rigby
- Horace Murphy as Judge Blake
- Anne Bennett as Nancy Harris
- Ed Cassidy as Jefferson "Jeff" Harris
- Roger Williams as Henchman Harry
- Fern Emmett as Bus Passenger Mother
- Yakima Canutt as Henchman Jake
- George Burton as Sheriff
- Merrill McCormick as Henchman Dan
- Loren Riebe as Henchman Red
- Victor Allen as Jim
- Al Taylor as Henchman Tim
- George Plues as Henchman Mike
