= The Face on the Bar-Room Floor (1923 film) =

1923 film directed by John Ford

- Directed by: John Ford
- Written by: G. Marion Burton; Eugene B. Lewis
- Based on: "The Face upon the Barroom Floor" by Hugh Antoine d'Arcy
- Produced by: William Fox
- Starring: Henry B. Walthall; Ruth Clifford
- Cinematography: George Schneiderman
- Distributed by: Fox Film Corporation
- Release date: January 1, 1923
- Running time: 60 minutes
- Country: United States
- Language: Silent (English intertitles)

The Face on the Bar-Room Floor is a 1923 American drama film directed by John Ford. The film was adapted from the poem of the same name by Hugh Antoine d'Arcy. The film is considered a lost film.

== Plot ==
As described in film magazine Exhibitor's Trade Review, famous artist Robert Stevens is in love with Marion. While spending a vacation along the coast of Maine, Robert paints a picture of one of the daughters of a fisherman. Some time later, the body of the girl is found in the sea, and Robert is accused of being the cause of her death. Marion refuses to have anything more to do with him, and Robert drifts from bad to worse. He becomes the victim of some thieves who leave a stolen wallet on him, and he is sent to prison. During a prisoner uprising, he escapes, but also saves the life of the Governor who had been visiting the prison. Robert swims out to a small island and walks to the lighthouse, where he finds the keeper ill and unable to keep his signal on. Robert flashes a light during a storm and thus protects the ships. He decides to return to prison, and on arrival finds a pardon awaiting him. Upon release, he returns to his old haunts and passes the Governor on the street. In a barroom, he is the subject of jests until he finally starts telling his story. He paints Marion's picture on the floor. Meanwhile, the Governor is at a dinner party and through a coincidence relates a story that makes Marion convinced that Robert has finally been found. Her brother confesses his guilt regarding the Fisherman's daughter which exonerates Robert. They go to him and bring him back, and in a while he has resumed his former life and is happy with Marion.

== Cast ==
- Henry B. Walthall as Robert Stevens
- Ruth Clifford as Marion Trevor
- Ralph Emerson as Dick Von Vleck
- Frederick Sullivan as Thomas Waring
- Alma Bennett as Lottie
- Norval MacGregor as Governor
- Michael Dark as Henry Drew
- Gus Saville as Fisherman

== See also ==
- List of lost films
