= Tess of the Storm Country (1922 film) =

1922 film

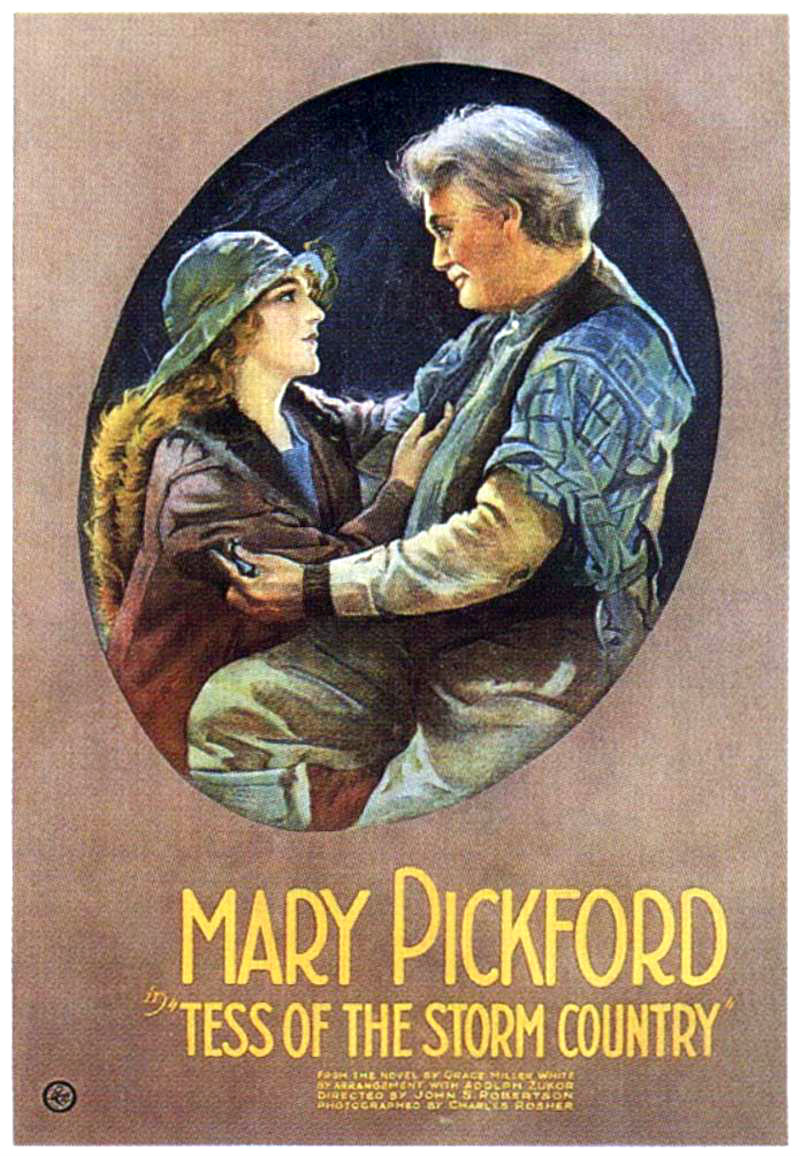
- Film poster
- Directed by: John S. Robertson
- Written by: Josephine Lovett; E. Lloyd Sheldon; Elmer Harris (uncredited adaptation); Grace Miller White (novel)
- Produced by: Mary Pickford
- Starring: Mary Pickford; Lloyd Hughes
- Cinematography: Charles Rosher
- Distributed by: United Artists
- Release date: November 12, 1922
- Running time: 118 minutes
- Country: United States
- Languages: Silent; English intertitles

Full movie

Tess of the Storm Country is a 1922 silent film starring Mary Pickford, directed by John S. Robertson, and based upon a Grace Miller White novel. It is a remake of Pickford's film from eight years prior and was subsequently remade a decade later as a sound version starring Janet Gaynor.

== Plot ==
17-year-old Tess Skinner is the daughter of a squatter, and wealthy man Elias Graves, who owns the land, is trying to get rid of them and the other squatter families. Tess is just as determined to make sure they all stay. Elias, however, grows more stubborn with failure. His determination to disperse the squatters has become an obsession. He is determined to kick them out of his land, not caring they don't have another place to go to. Graves' son, Frederick, is on her side and doesn't think about squatters the way his father does. Frederick's sister Teola fears her father, who thinks obedience is more important than love. She has fallen in love with law student Dan Jordan and one night lets Dan understand that they cannot wait any longer to marry as she is pregnant with his child. Dan promises that they will run away together if Elias won't agree to them marrying.

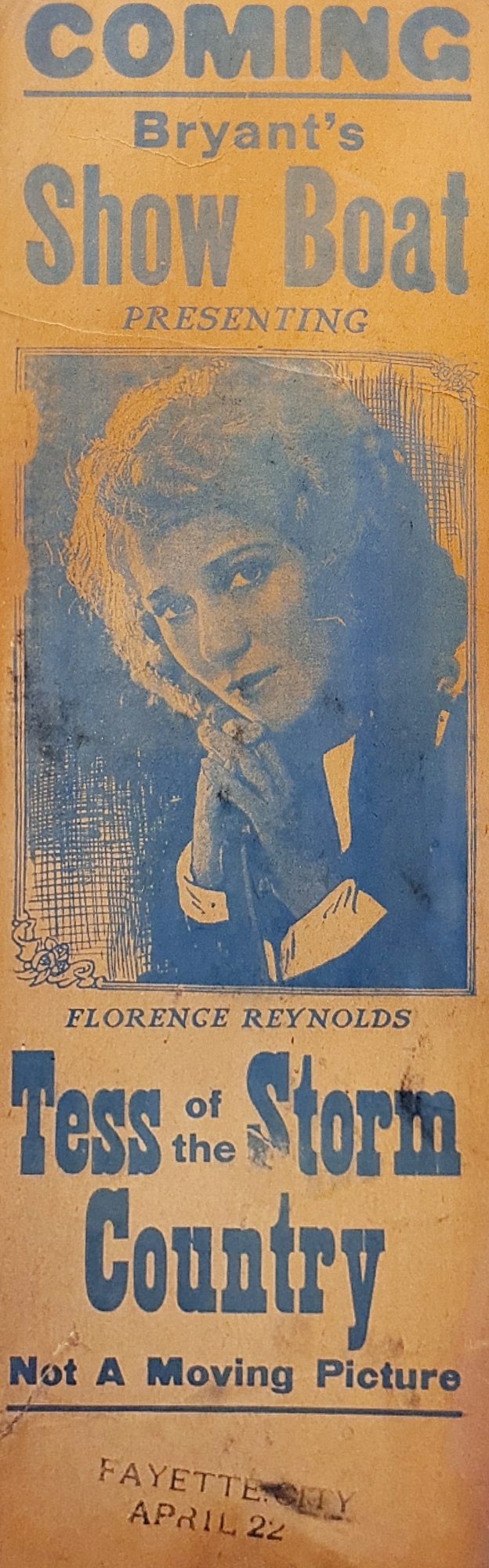
Poster for a Bryant's Show Boat live production of Tess of the Storm Country in Fayette City, Pennsylvania.

Dan tries to win over Teola's father's trust in him by suggesting he can throw the squatters off his land, because they are catching fish illegally. Frederick, meanwhile, is charmed by Tess and admits he could really fall for her if she would get cleaned up. When men come to the Skinner residence to find proof they're netting, Tess hides the evidence her father is a fisherman. Later, they become hungry and Tess' father decides to start fishing again. He is discovered by Dan Jordan who in return is shot to death by Ben Letts. Ben thereafter blames Tess' dad for the shooting, who is consequently arrested. Tess is crushed and takes it out on Elias when he announces he will do anything for her dad to pay the penalty. When the trial starts, Tess is crushed she isn't allowed to visit her father. Later, on the way home, Ben Letts forces himself up to her as her future husband, despite the fact Tess is unwilling to marry him. She tries to escape when her dog comes to her rescue, attacking Ben. Ben vows vengeance. Now that Tess is all alone, Frederick keeps her company and they fall in love. Elias finds out and tells Fred he doesn't want to have anything to do with him anymore. Frederick announces he is planning on marrying Tess as soon as he finishes college. Meanwhile, Teola, devastated and pregnant with Dan's child out of wedlock, has walked down to the river to commit suicide but cannot bring herself to do it when she suddenly and accidentally slips and falls into the river anyway. Tess, discovering Teola fighting in the water, jumps in and saves her and brings her to the cottage where the baby is born, which Tess promises to claim as her own to save Teola's reputation. In return, Teola keeps on supporting Tess financially. One night, Teola isn't allowed to leave the house, so Tess breaks in to get milk for the baby. She is caught by Elias, who is outraged. Meanwhile, Fred has just returned from college. Ben's mate Ezra, burdened by his conscience of knowing who the real killer is, threatens Ben to tell the truth about Ben having killed Dan Jordan, to which Ben responds by attacking and strangling Ezra, thereafter hiding him. Fred pays Tess a visit and finds his sister there as well. When he notices the baby, Tess tells him she found it. Fred doesn't believe her and thinks the baby is hers. He is shocked and ashamed and leaves immediately. Ezra, however, who has survived, has managed to crawl into the neighborhood and is found in the snow by Frederick and Teola to whom Ezra reveals that Ben Letts is responsible for the killing of Dan, not Tess' dad. Meanwhile, Ben fears of getting caught and plans on leaving town. He is determined to take Tess with him. He sneaks into her cottage and notices the baby. When Tess comes in, he forces her to marry him. She refuses to, but Fred comes in to rescue her. They together hit Ben unconscious, but Fred leaves bitterly as he is still shocked about Tess having a baby.

Tess is ostracized and the dying infant is refused baptism, so Tess sneaks into the church and does her own ritual. Teola and Elias are both in presence. Elias demands for her to be thrown out of church, but Teola becomes too emotional and admits the baby is hers. Elias is shocked but forgives her, but Teola soon dies. Fred realizes he has made an awful mistake, but Tess isn't able to forgive his horrible treatment towards her. She goes back home and reunites with her father, who has just been released from jail. Elias and Fred later stop by to apologize. Both Elias and Fred are forgiven and the film ends with Tess and Fred kissing.

== Cast ==
- Mary Pickford - Tessibel 'Tess' Skinner
- Lloyd Hughes - Frederick Graves
- Gloria Hope - Teola Graves
- David Torrence - Elias Graves
- Forrest Robinson - Orn 'Daddy' Skinner
- Jean Hersholt - Ben Letts
- Danny Hoy - Ezra Longman
- Robert Russell - Mr. Daniel 'Dan' Jordan
- Gus Saville - Old Man Longman
- Madame De Bodamere - Mrs. Longman
- Milton Berle - Bit Role (uncredited)
- Jeanne Carpenter - (uncredited)

== Production ==
Leading actress Pickford's previous film Little Lord Fauntleroy flopped critically. Pickford realized she had to make a movie the audience loved to see her in. She wanted to play the role again, because she loved the character and stated the crew had more abilities with a bigger budget and better technology.
