= Teller House =

Historic hotel in Central City, Colorado, United States

- U.S. National Register of Historic Places
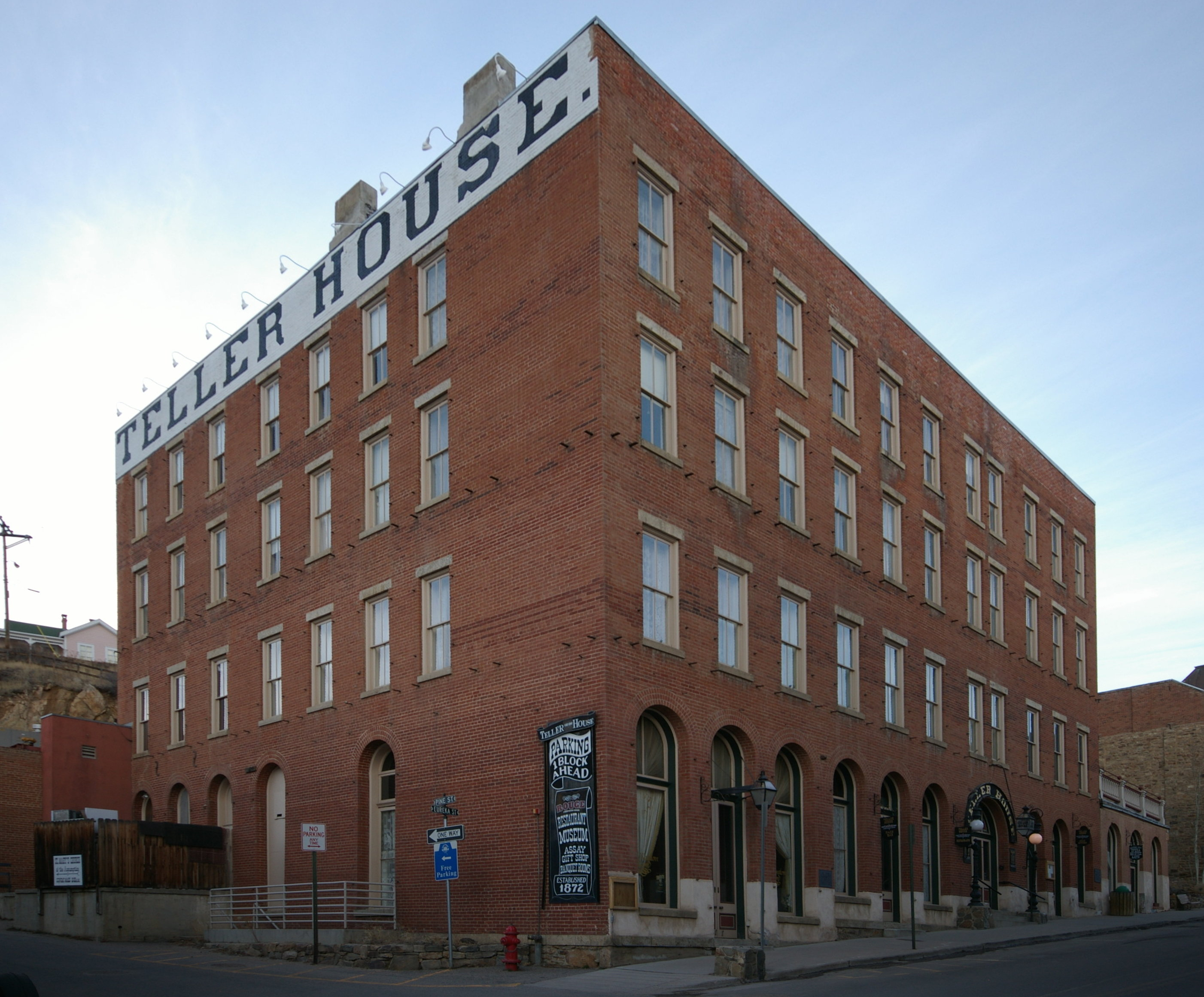

- Location within Colorado Location within the United States
- Location: Eureka St., Central City, Colorado
- Coordinates: 39°48′3″N 105°30′46″W
- Area: less than one acre
- Built: 1872
- Architectural style: Romanesque
- NRHP reference No.: 73000475
- Added to NRHP: January 18, 1973

Teller House is a historic hotel in Central City, Colorado.

== History ==
Due to the growth of Central City and the lack of accommodations, the Register Call newspaper began advocating for the construction of a higher class hotel. Henry M. Teller, a local lawyer, offered to spend $30,000 to build a 50-room hotel, provided the community could donate $10,000 toward it. After a fundraising committee raised $9,200, Teller decided to proceed with construction.

By 1871, the land for the hotel had been selected on Eureka Street and grading of the site began. Around this time, Teller decided to expand the size of the hotel to almost double what had been originally planned. The brick exterior and roof were completed by the end of 1871, using nearly 1.4 million bricks from the Hooper brick yard in Central City. S. E. Bush and T. J. Allen were hired to operate the hotel for the first five years, as well as oversee the installation of carpet and furnishings. The total cost of construction ended at roughly $104,000 once completed.

The hotel officially opened its doors on June 24, 1872 with a gala celebration featuring a multi-course dinner and music. The amenities of the hotel included a library, barber shop, billiard room, bar, dining room, and ballroom. The hotel's furnishings were provided by Rogers, Bradley & Co. in Denver.

On May 28, 1873, Ulysses S. Grant was received at the hotel, which had the path to the door paved with silver ingots worth $12,000 for the occasion.

On May 21, 1874, a fire broke out in Central City and volunteers hung wet blankets over the windows and doors of the hotel to help protect it. The hotel survived the fire, which destroyed 150 buildings in the city.

In 1935, the hotel was purchased by the Central City Opera House Association.

The building opened in 1991 as a casino, which operated until 2000. A new management company reopened the casino in 2005, but it closed again later that year. As of August 2026, the Teller House is only accessible through guided tours.

== The Face on the Barroom Floor ==
The bar at the Teller House is well known for The Face on the Barroom Floor, a painting of a woman's face on the wooden floor, done in 1936 by local artist Herndon Davis, as a joke after being fired by the Teller House.

== Statue of Minerva ==
The grand staircase of the Teller House features a 40-pound bronze statue of Minerva, which stands about 31 inches tall. A local legend states that any visitors that pat the statue's backside will receive good luck. On June 20, 1987, the statue was stolen from the grand staircase of the hotel during the annual Madams and Miners Ball. The statue was later found on June 28, 1987 by a motorcyclist on the side of the road near mile marker seven on Colo. 119.

== Notable Guests ==
- P. T. Barnum
- Buffalo Bill
- Schuyler Colfax
- Adolph Coors
- Ulysses S. Grant
- John J. Ingalls
- Henry Morton Stanley
- Horace Tabor
- Mark Twain
- Artemus Ward
- Walt Whitman
- Oscar Wilde
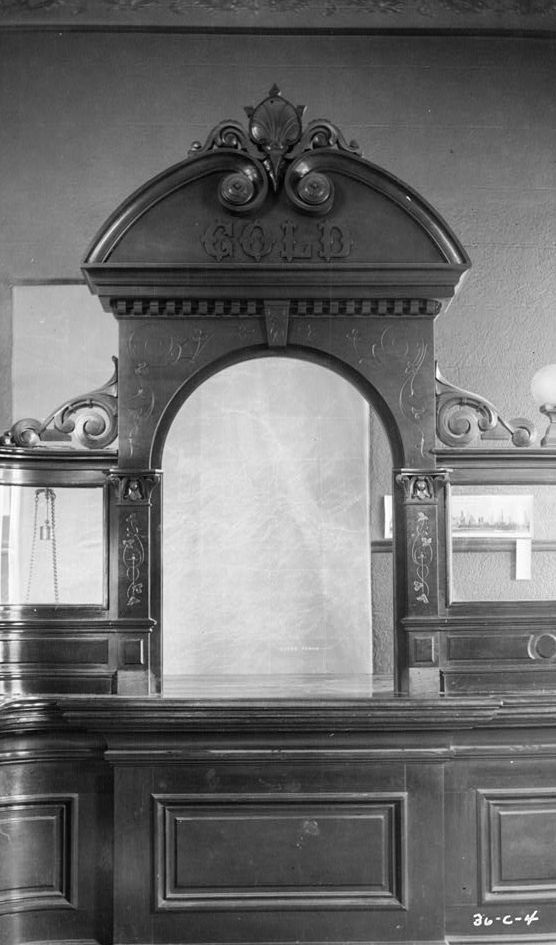
Interior

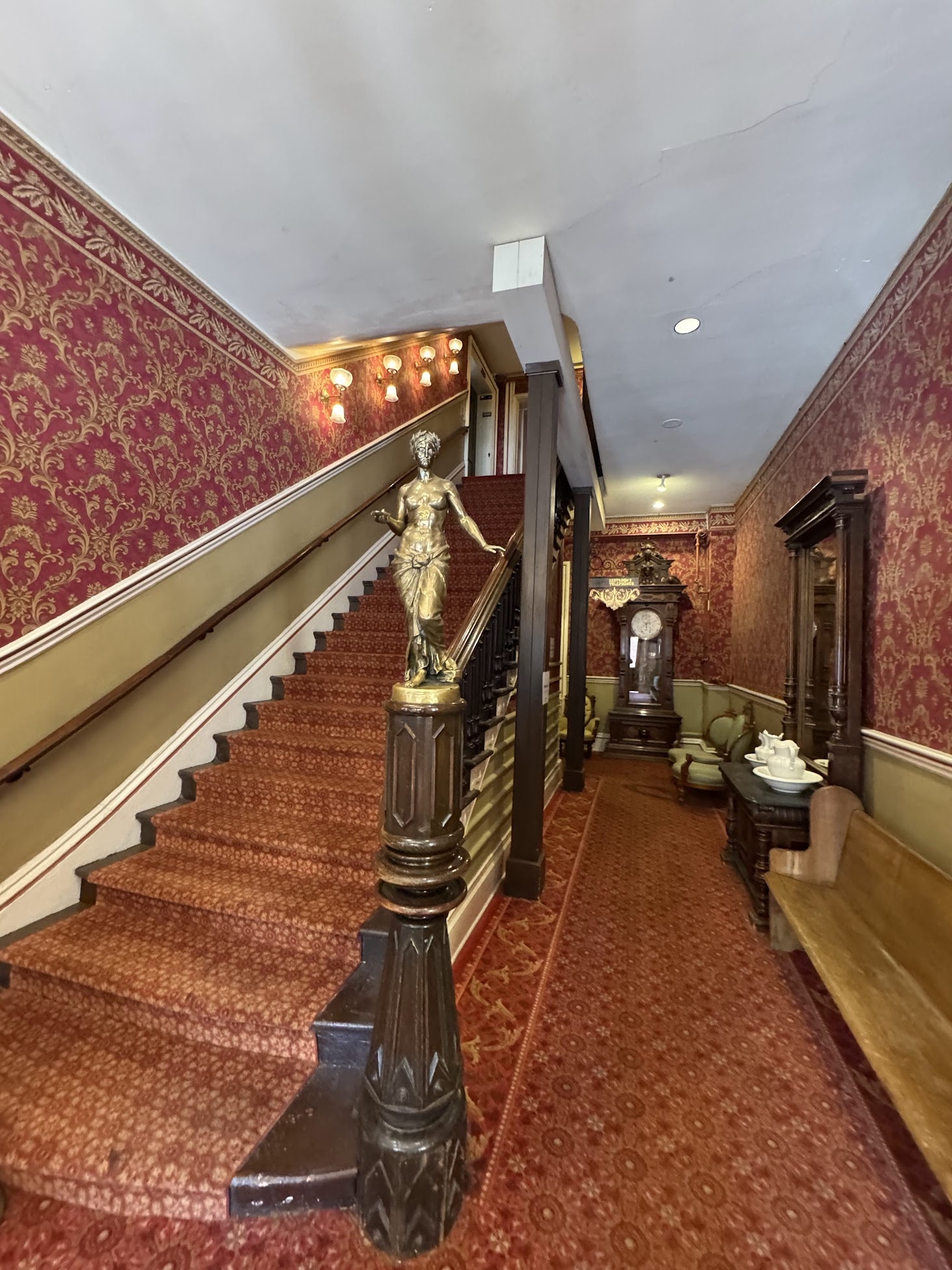
Staircase with bronze statue of Minerva

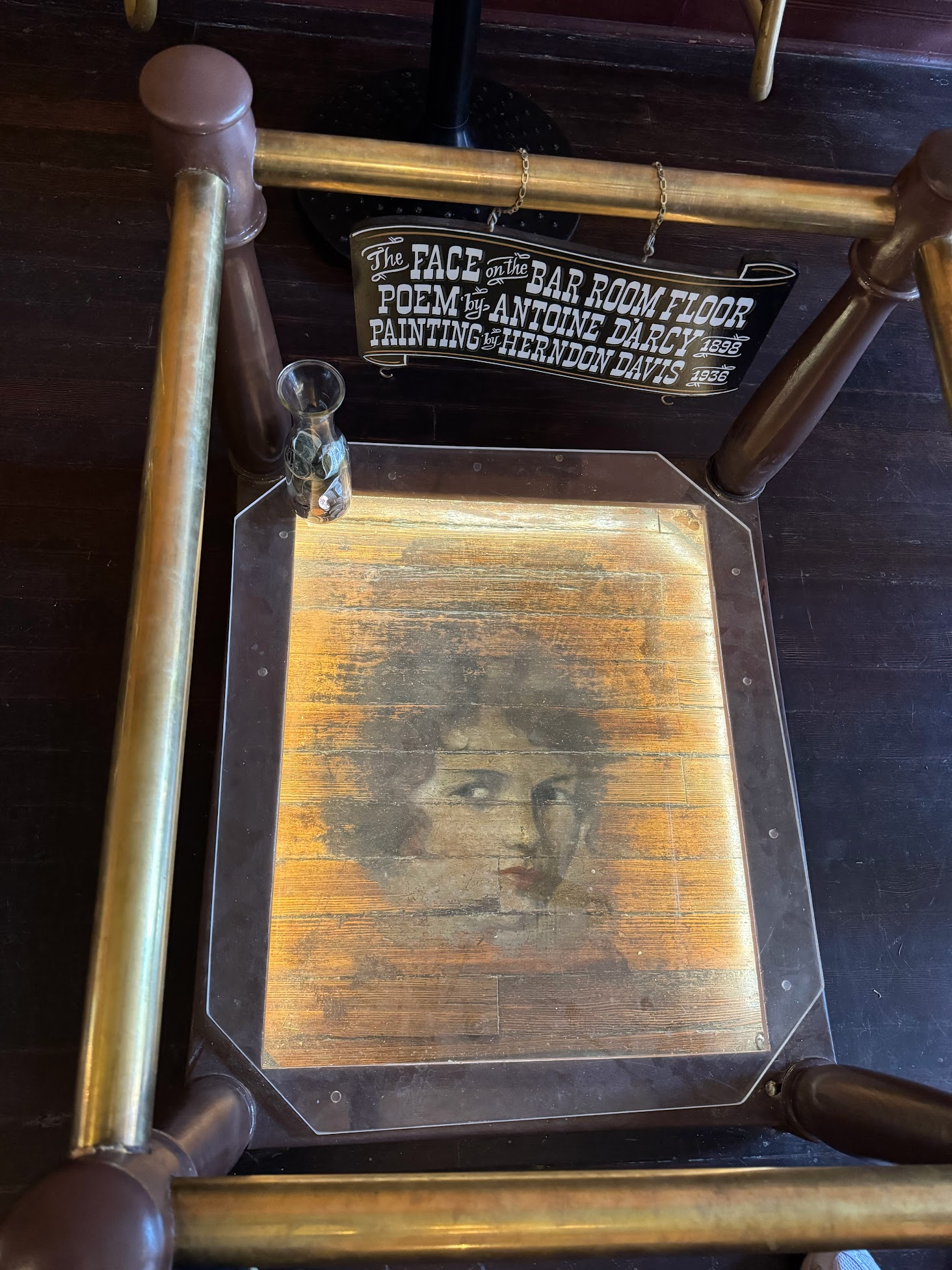
The Face on the Barroom Floor

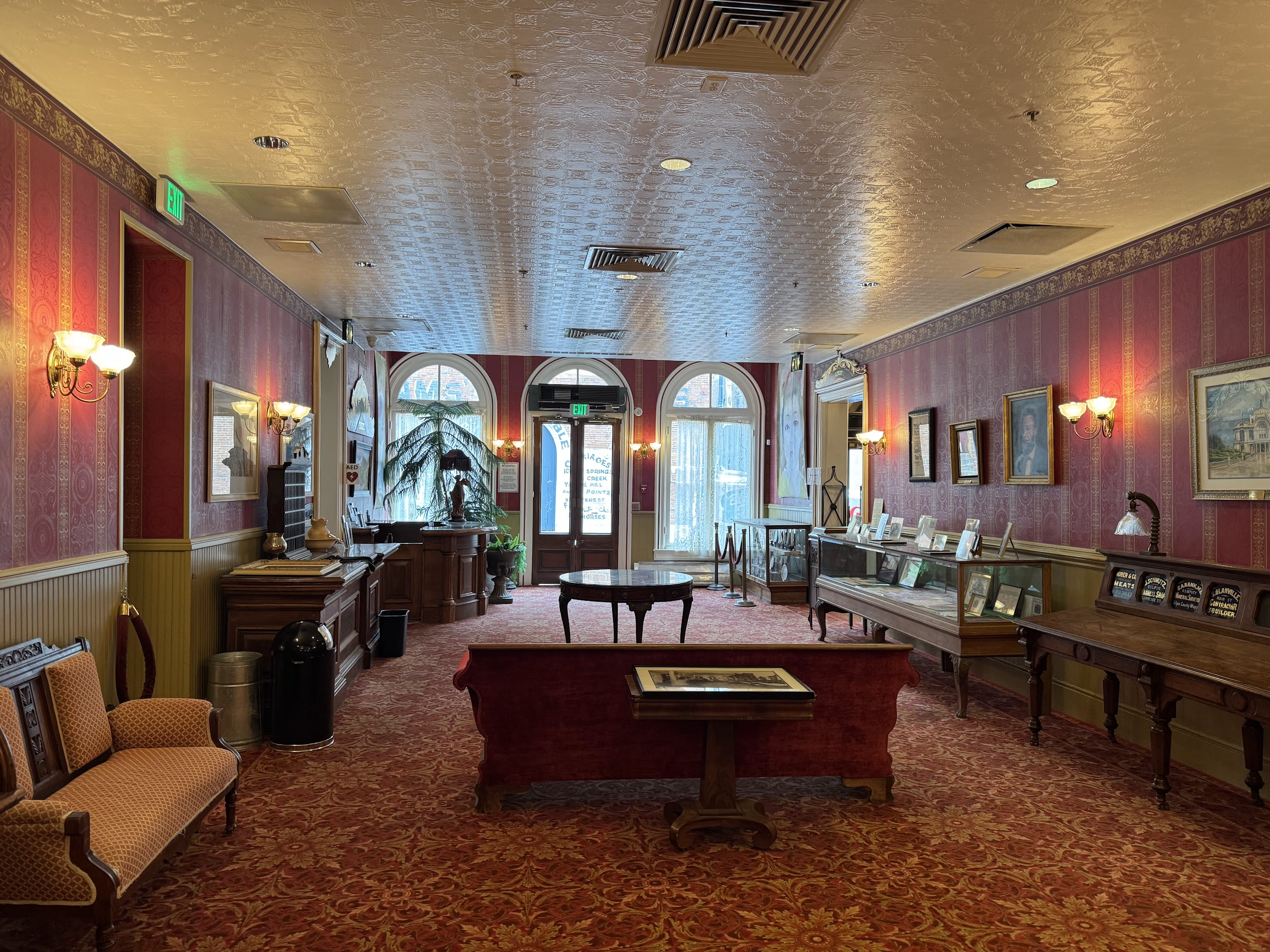
Lobby

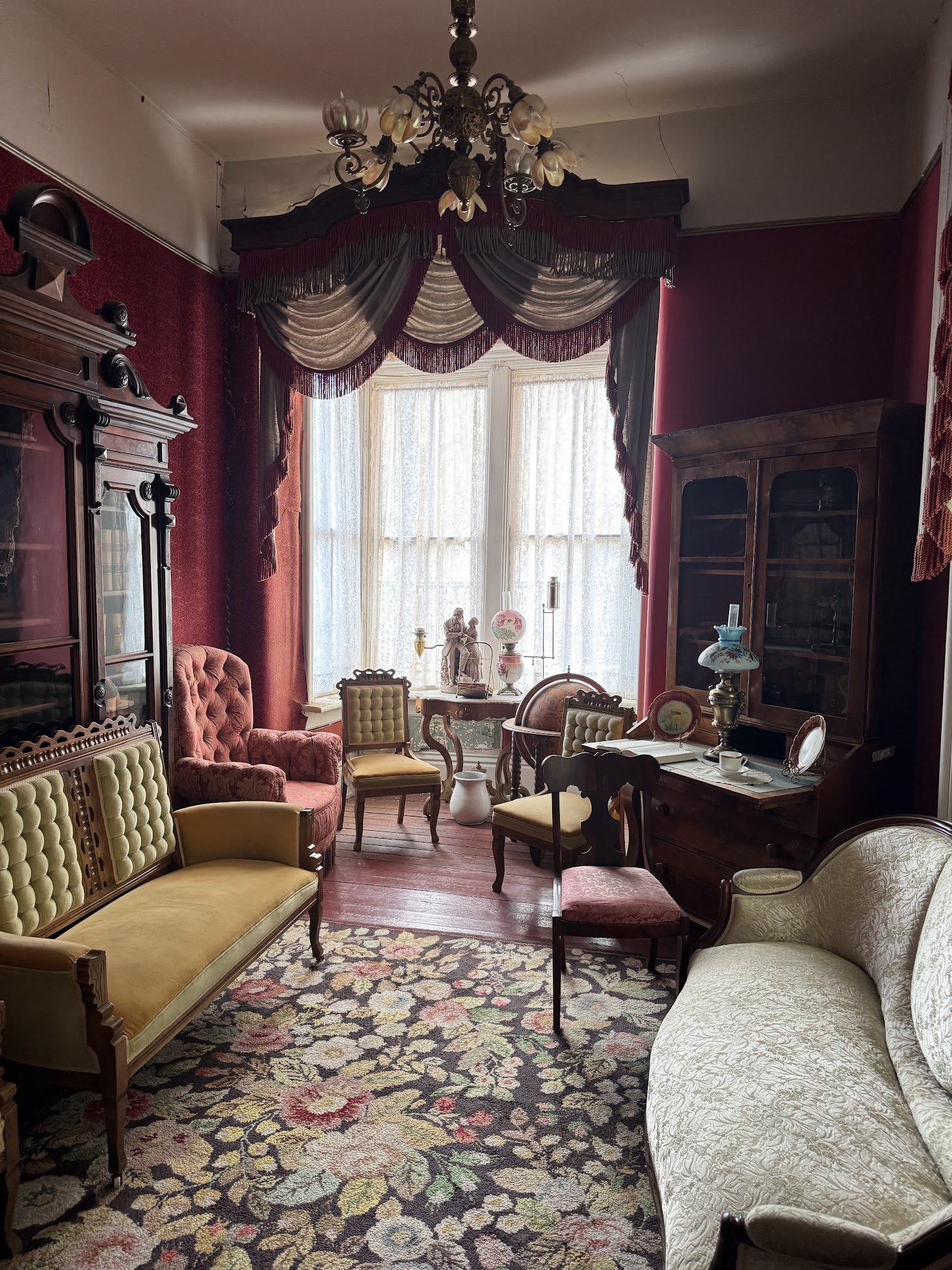
Room

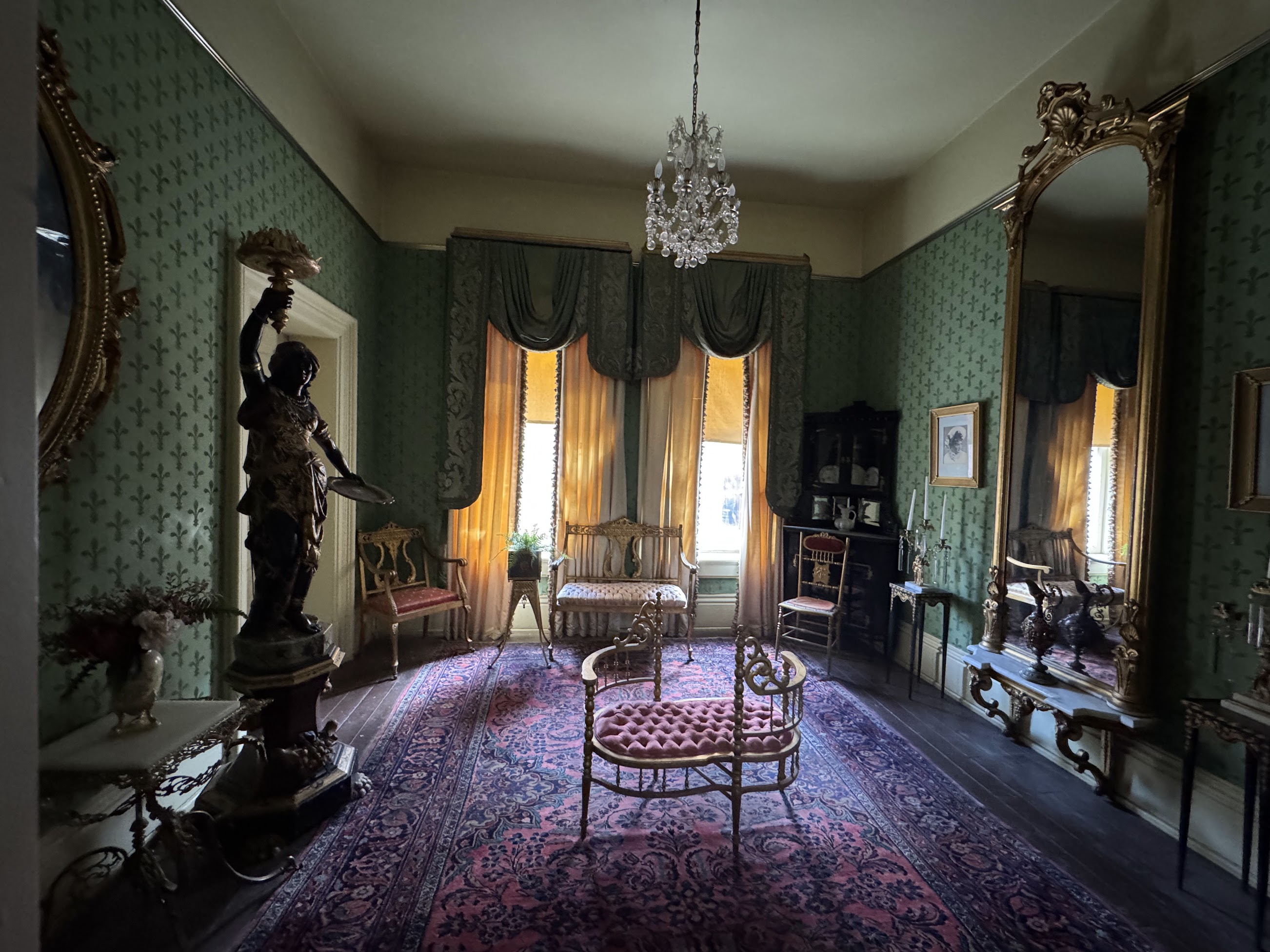
Baby Doe Tabor Room

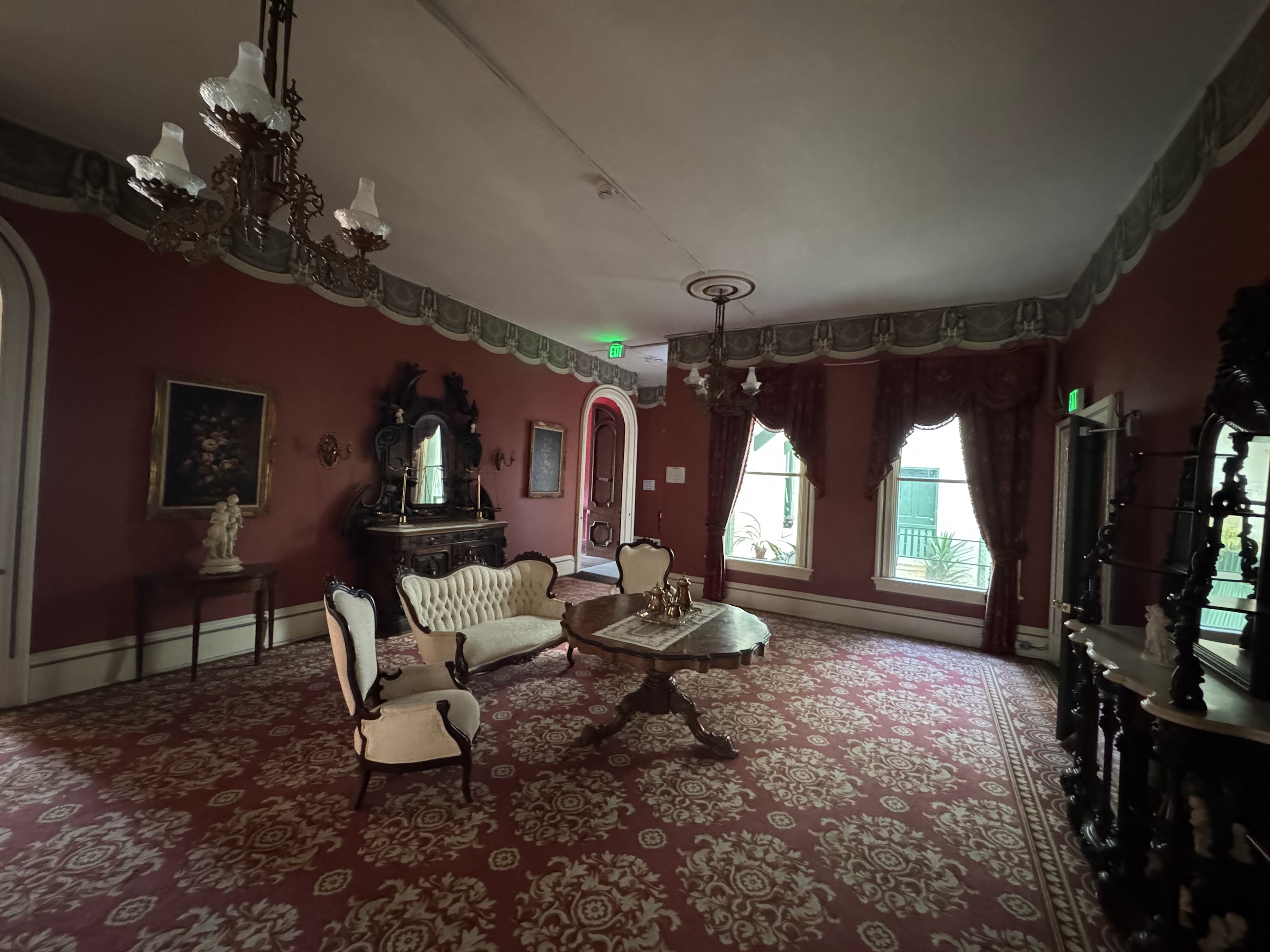
Henry M. Teller Parlor

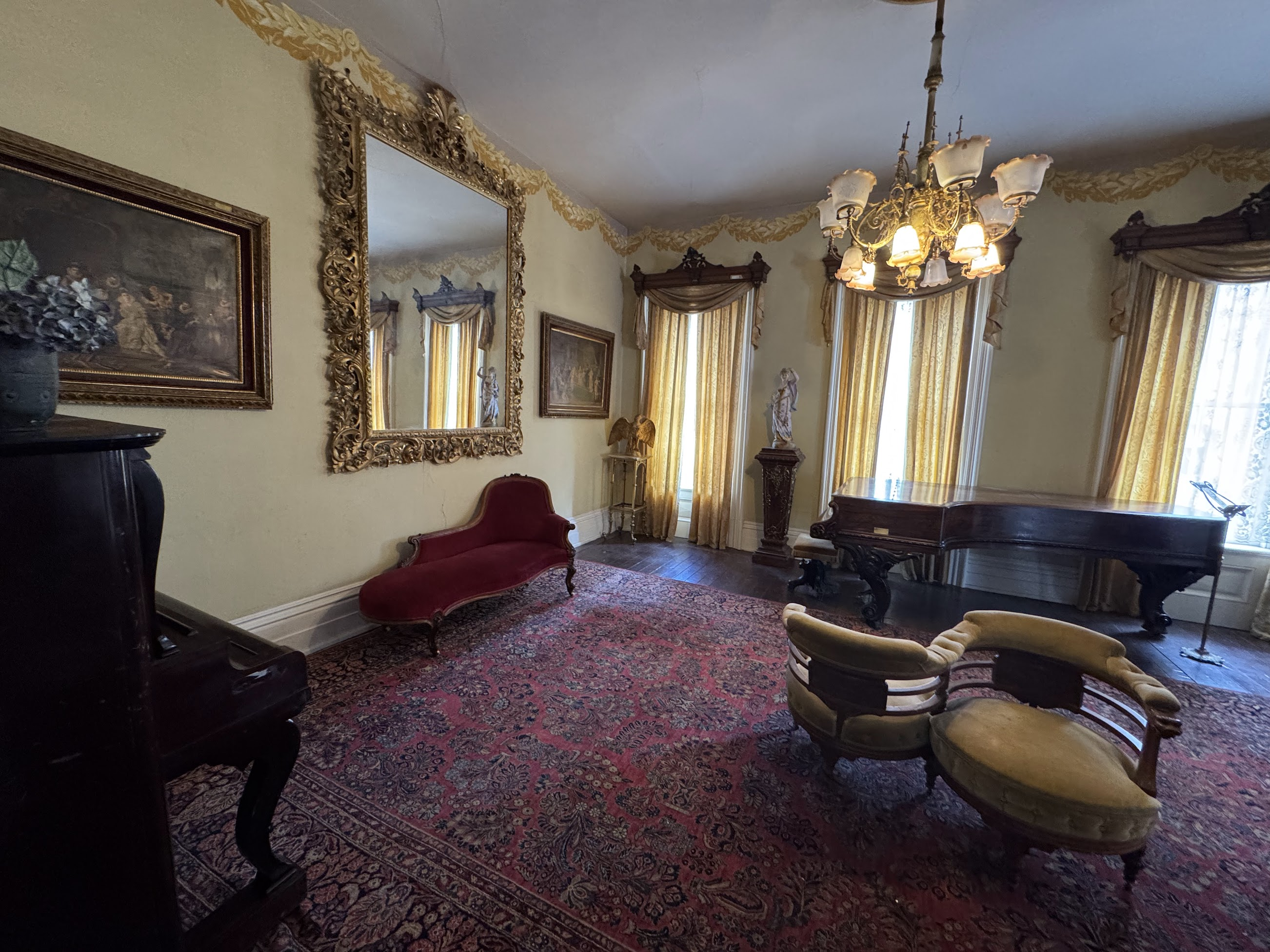
Music Room

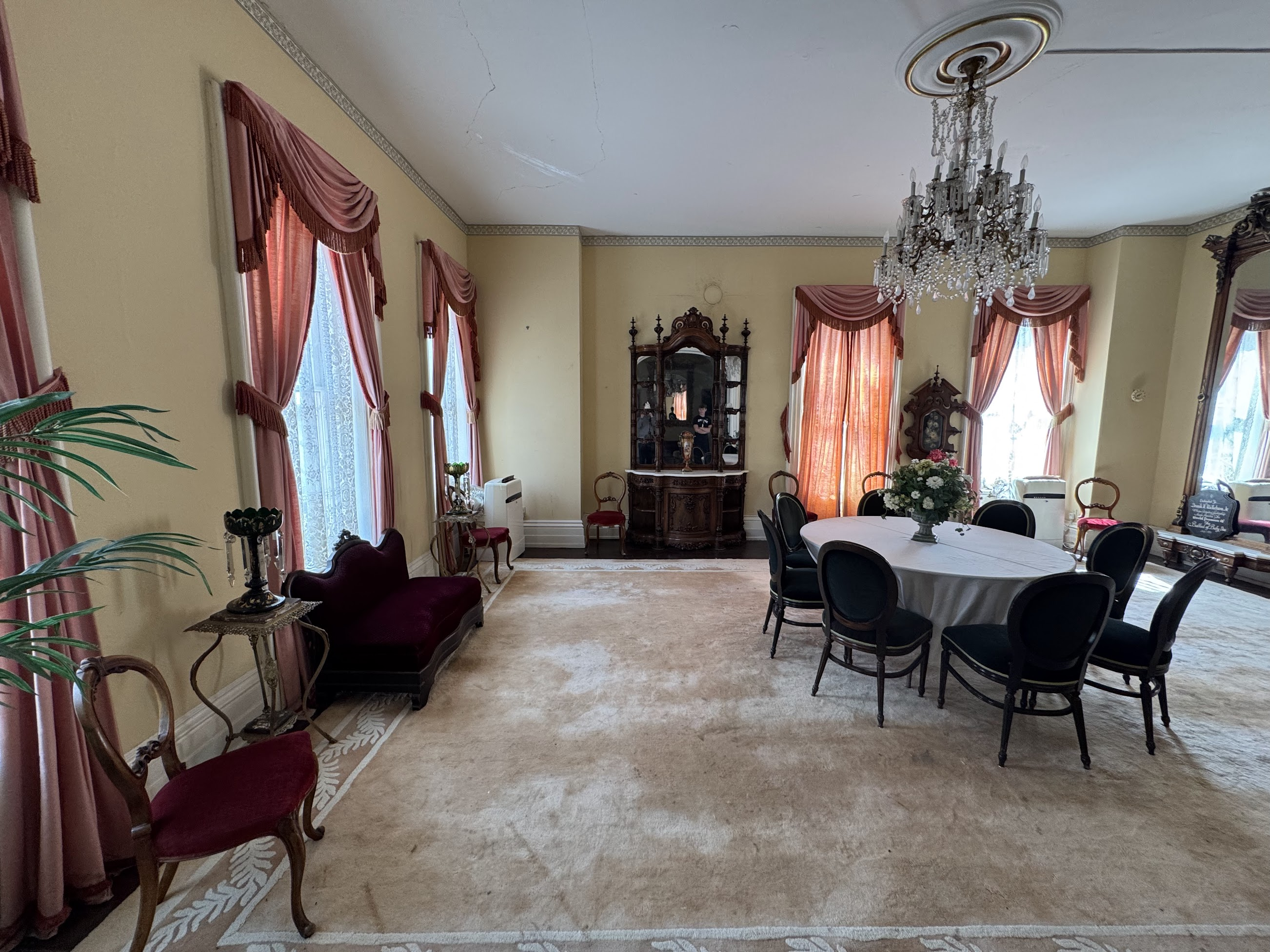
Governor's Parlor

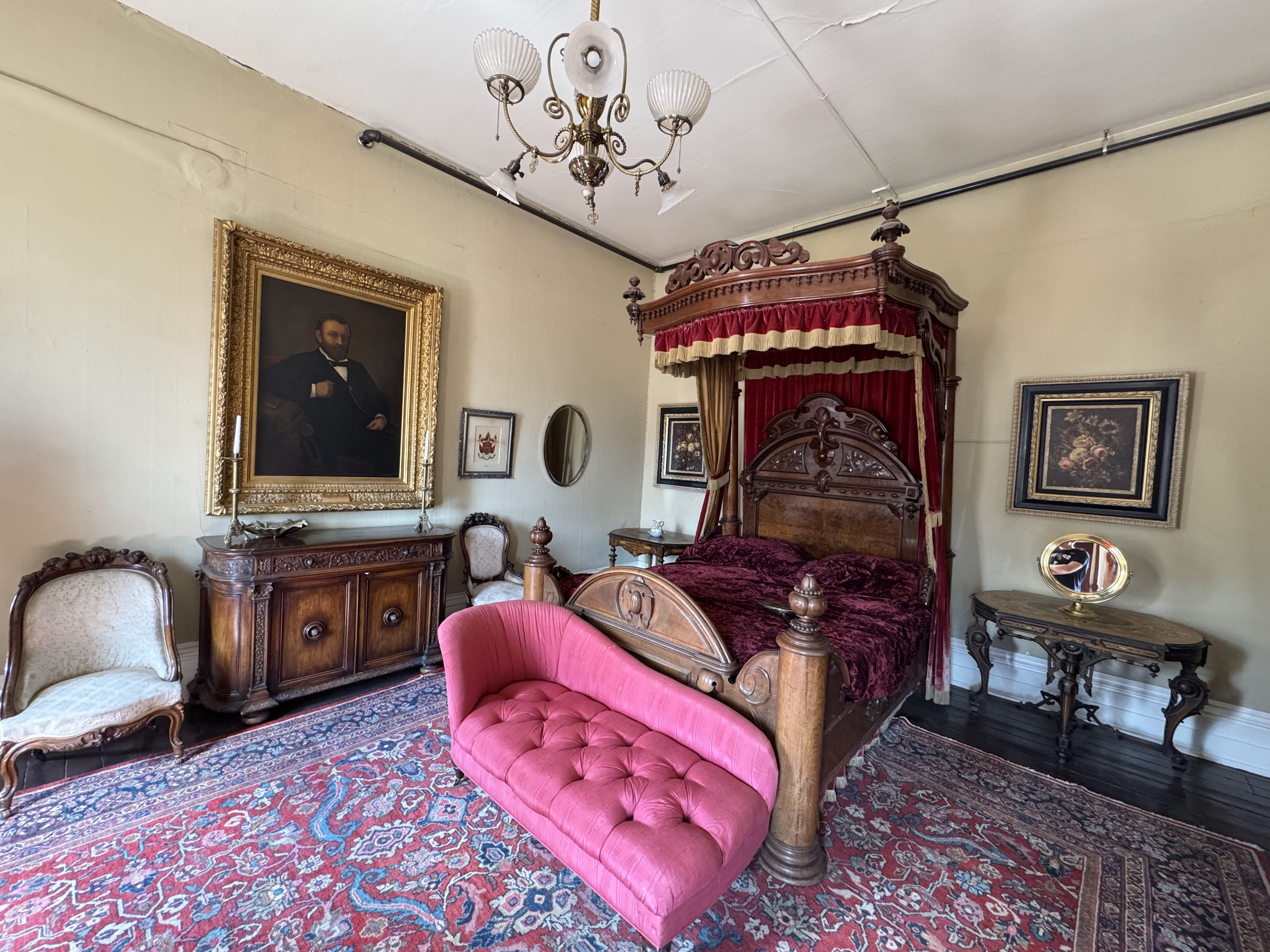
The Grant Suite

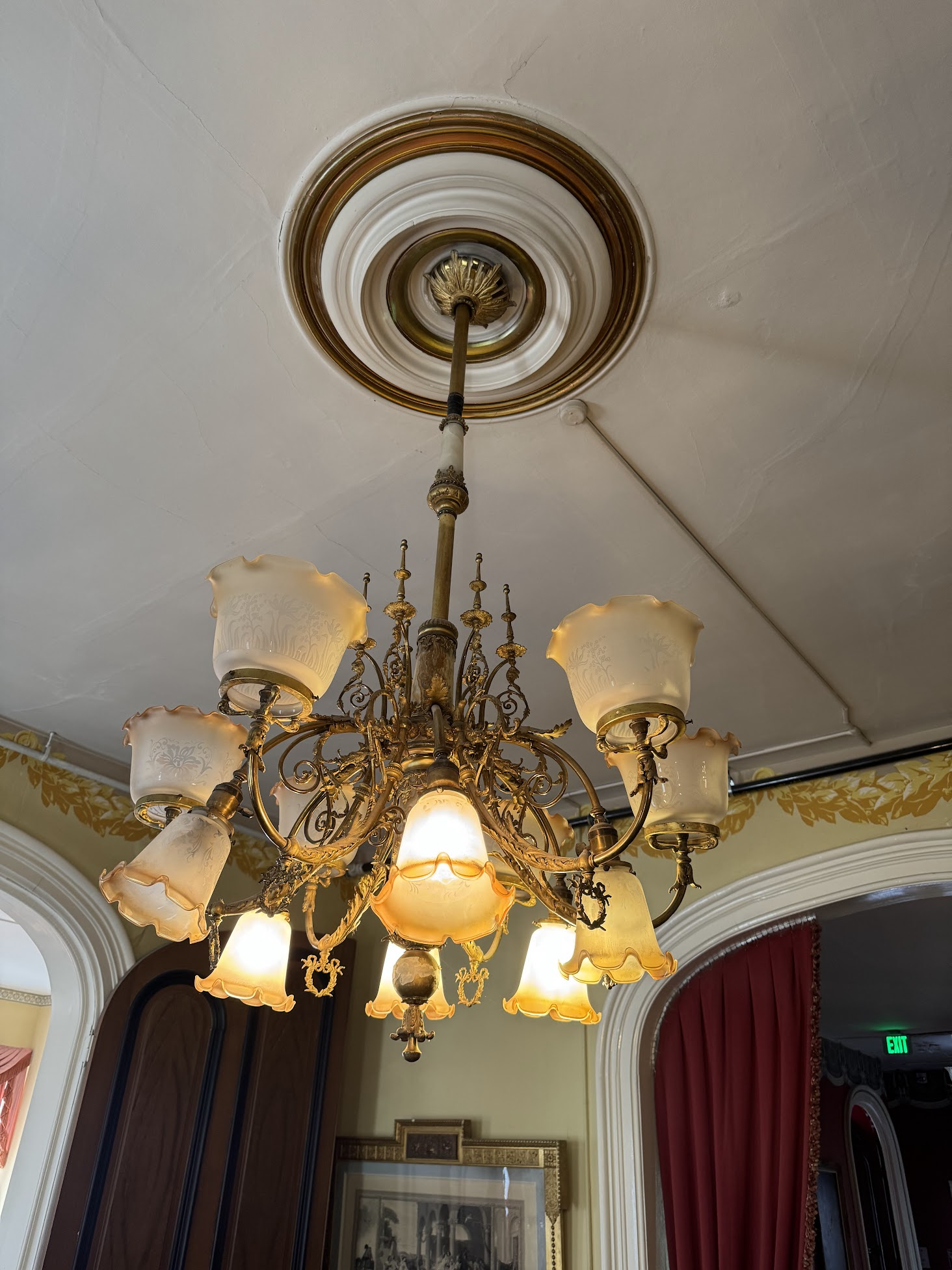
Chandelier in Music Room

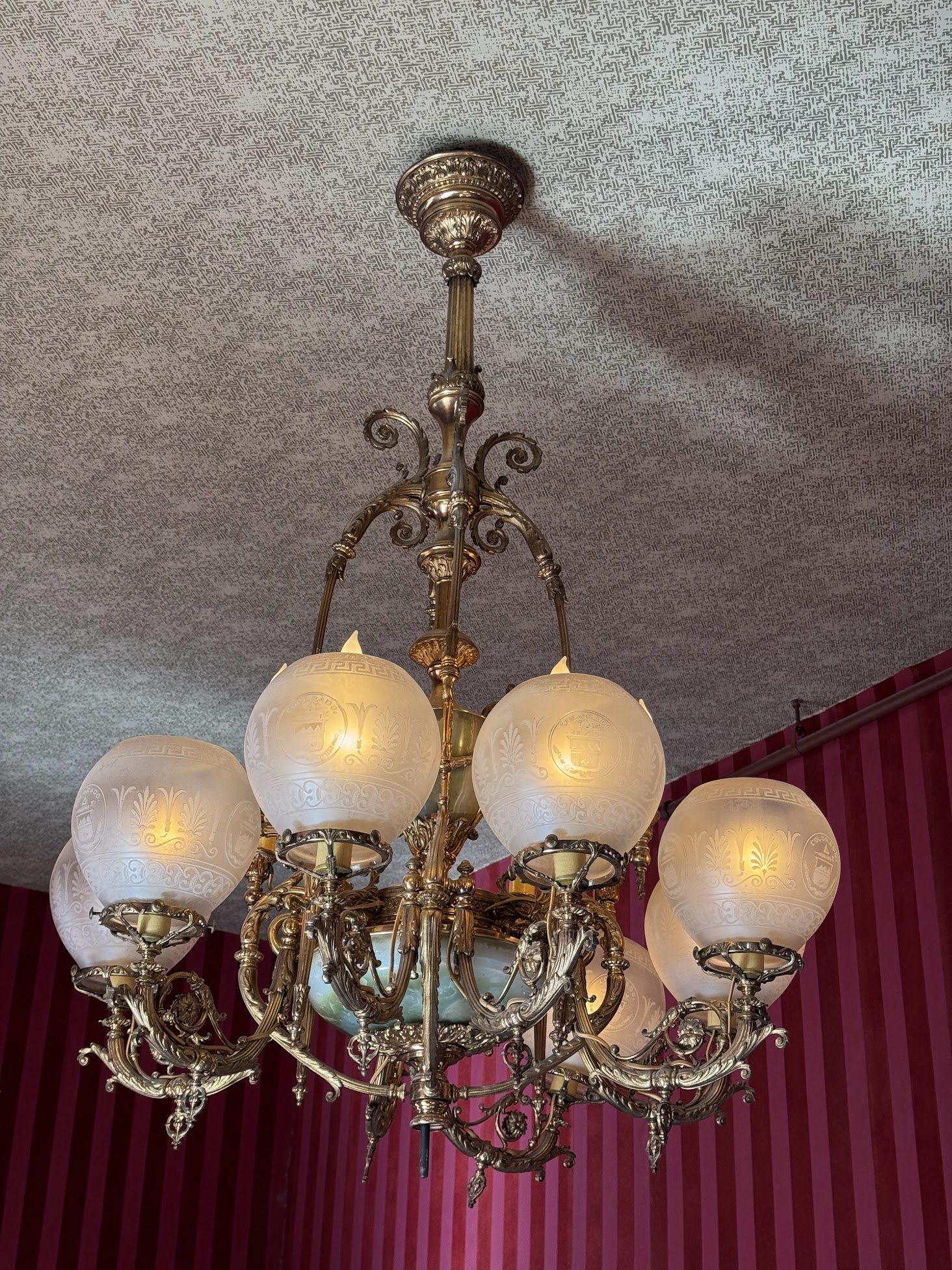
Chandelier

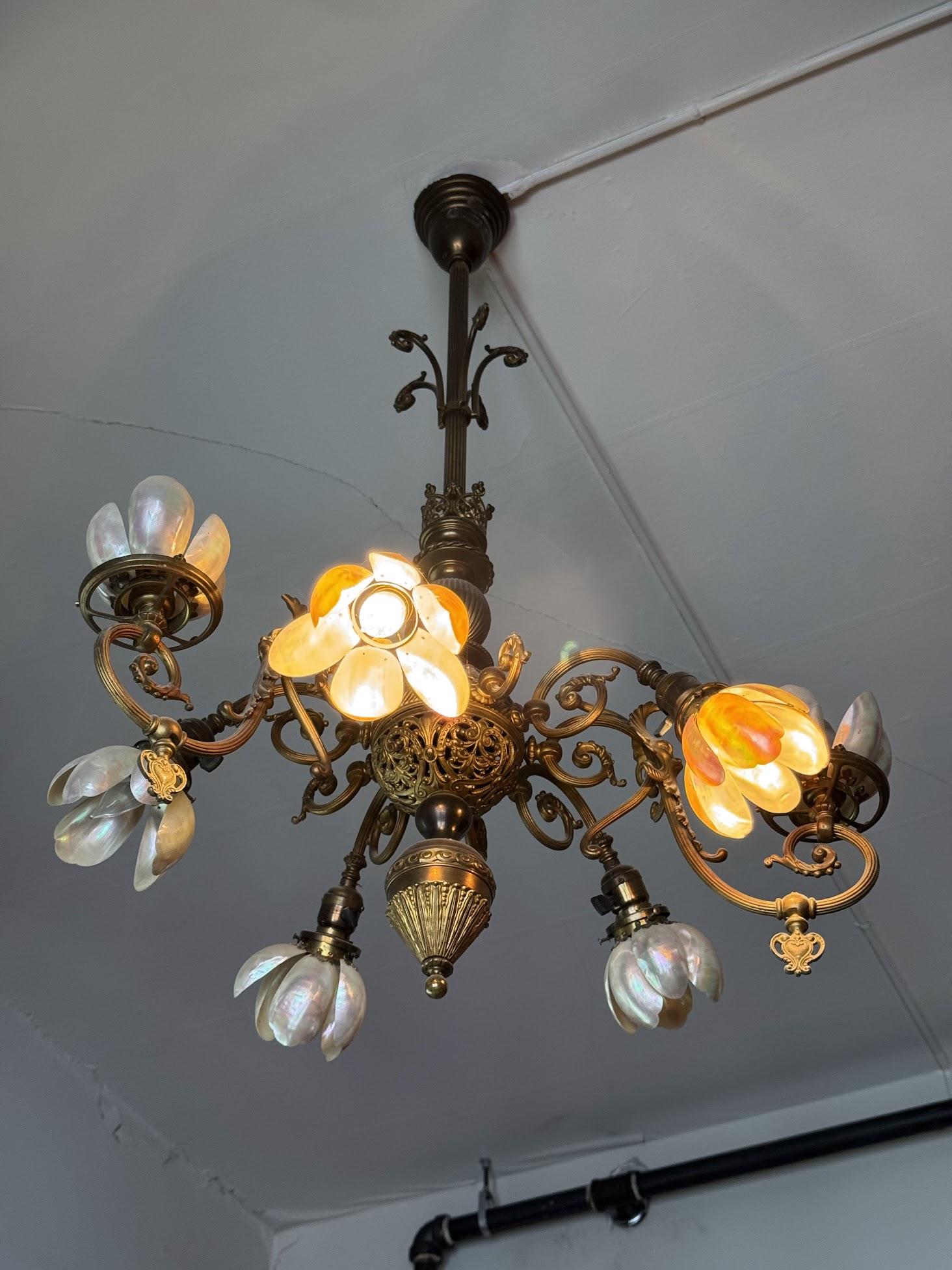
Chandelier

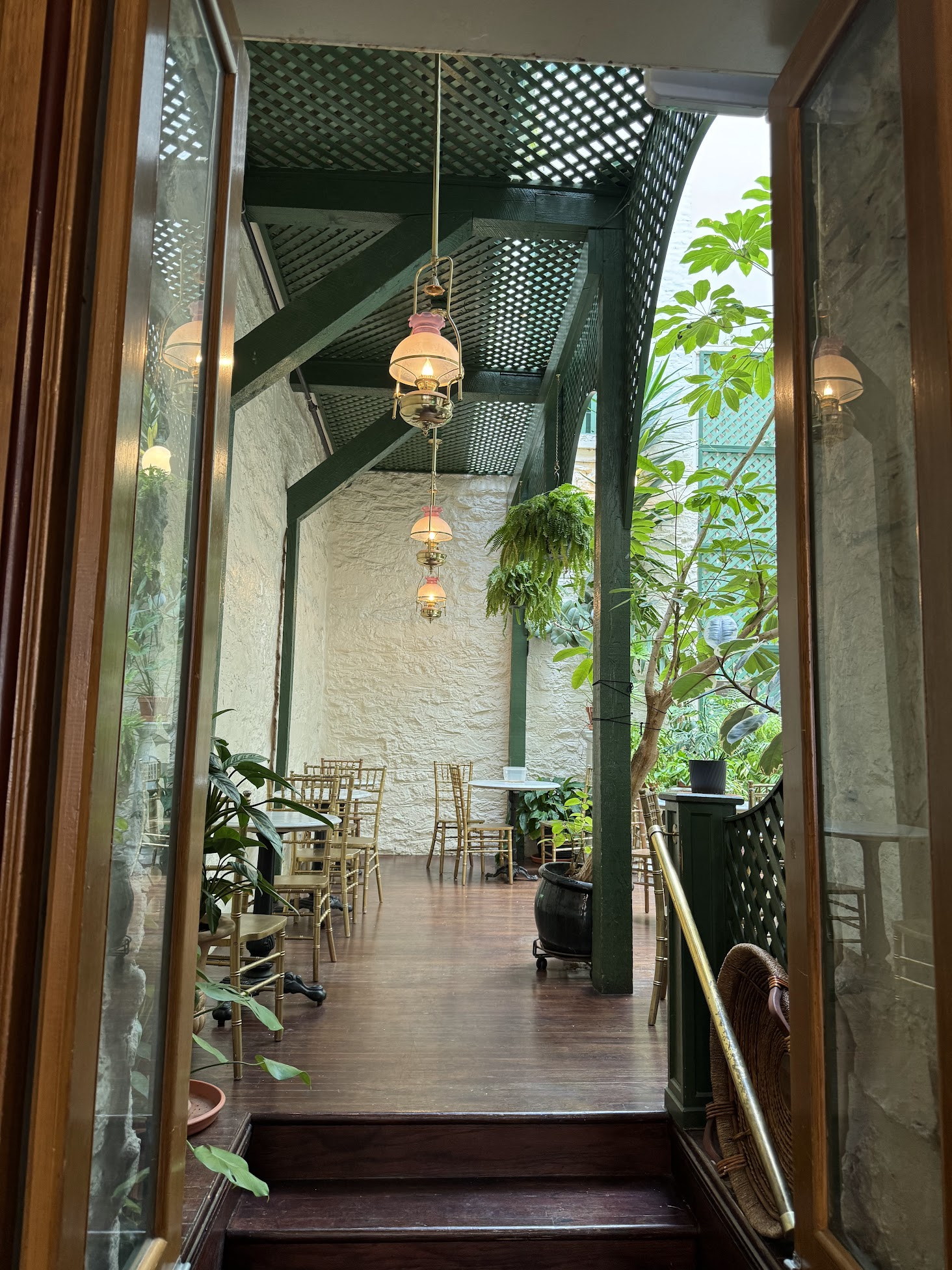
Atrium

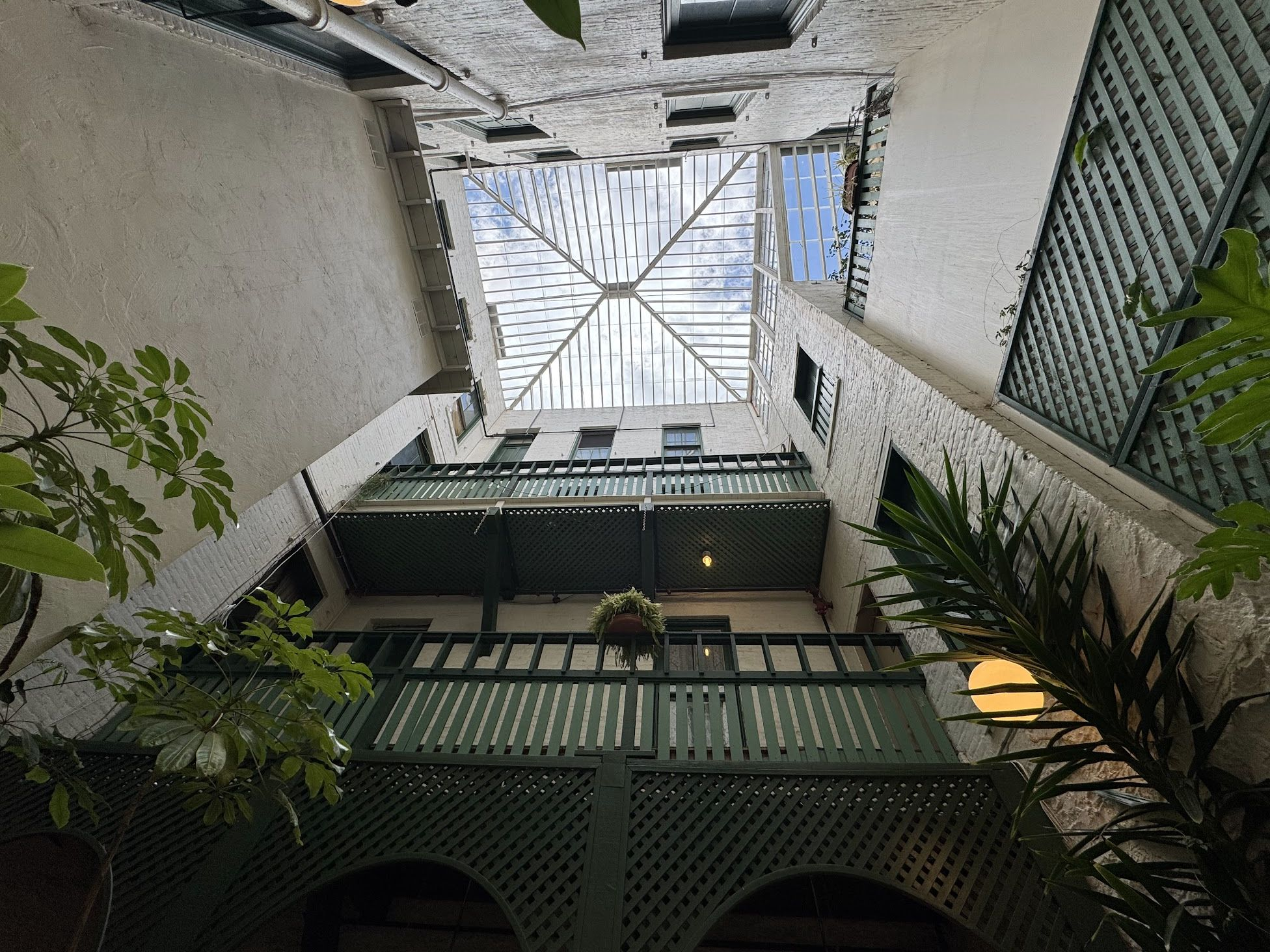
Atrium

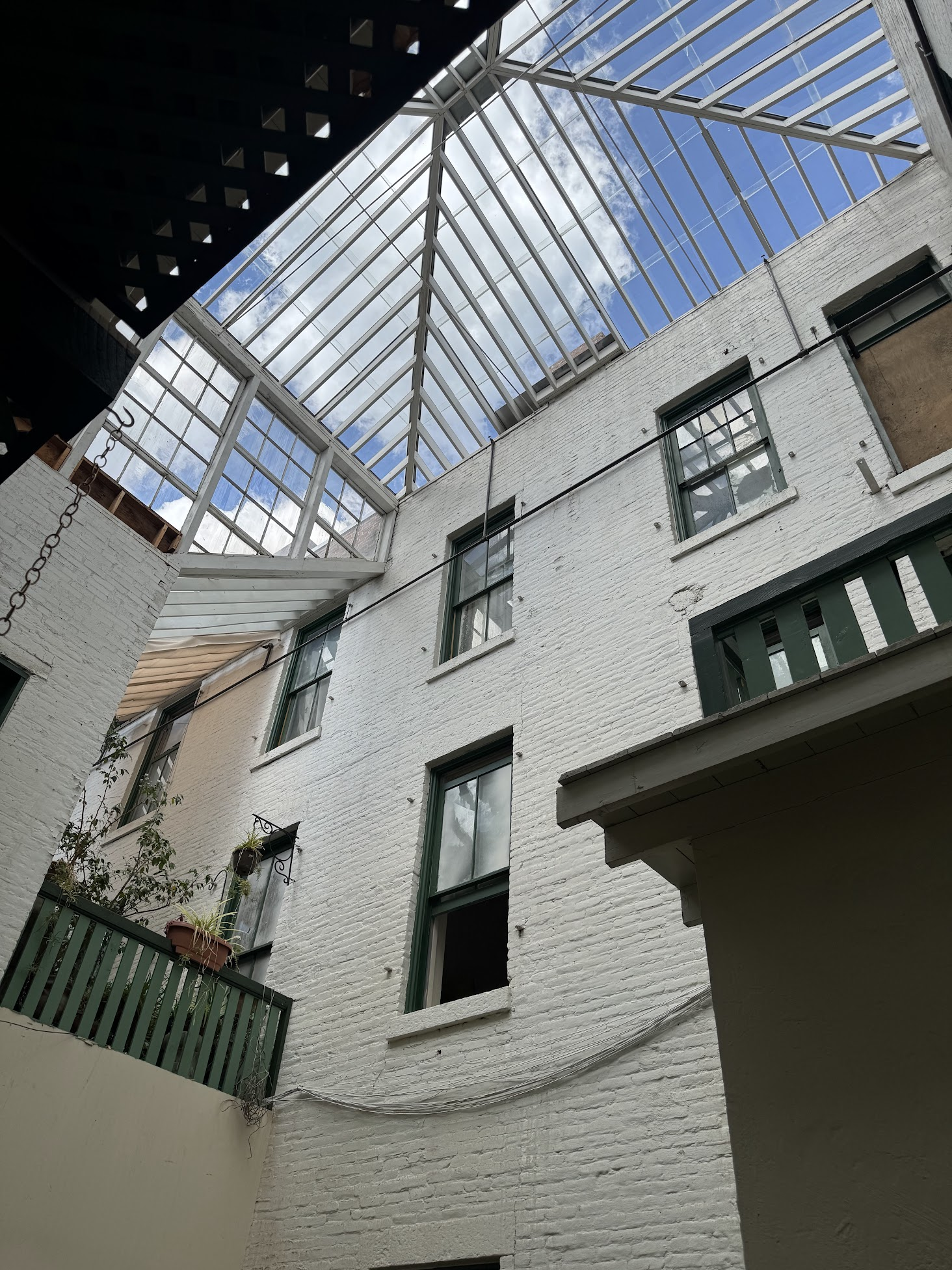
Atrium

== See also ==
- List of casinos in Colorado
- National Register of Historic Places listings in Gilpin County, Colorado
