= Wild West (serial) =

1925 film

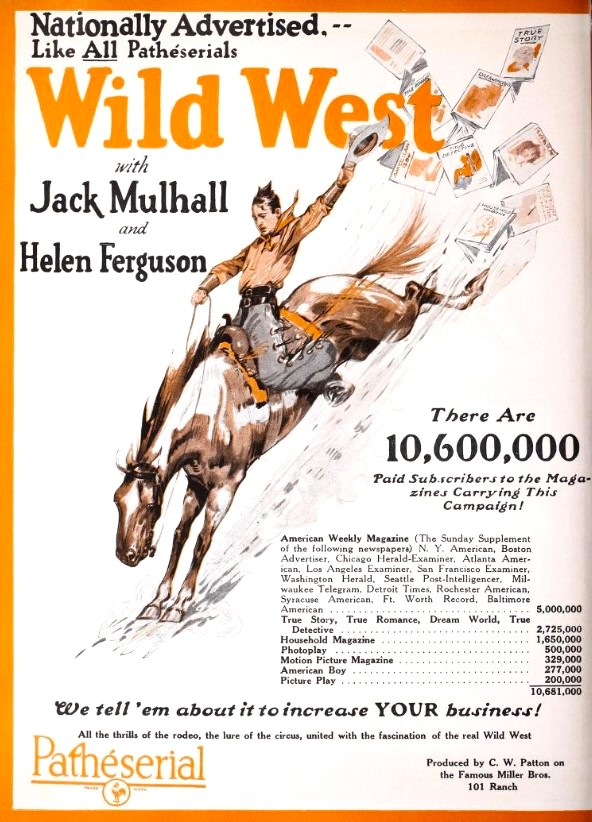
- Trade advertisement
- Directed by: Robert F. Hill
- Written by: Jack Natteford
- Starring: Jack Mulhall; Helen Ferguson
- Distributed by: Pathé Exchange
- Release date: September 27, 1925
- Running time: 10 episodes
- Country: United States
- Language: Silent (English intertitles)

Wild West is a 1925 American silent Western film serial directed by Robert F. Hill. This serial is considered to be a lost film.

== Cast ==
- Jack Mulhall as Jimmy Whitehawk
- Helen Ferguson as Polly Breen
- Edward Burns as Colonel Hardcastle / Tom Osborne (credited as Ed Burns)
- Eddie Phillips as Bob Miller
- Fred Burns as Joe Miller
- Larry Steers as Dr. Alonzo Powers
- George Burton as Dan Norton
- Milla Davenport as Chalky Withers
- Virginia Warwick as Elsie Withers
- Dan Dix as Pat Casey
- Gus Saville
- Buck Lucas as Self
- Nowata Richardson as Nowatta Slim Richardson
- Inez Gomez as Wynoka

== Chapters ==
1. The Land Rush
2. On the Show
3. The Outlaw Elephant
4. Ride 'Em Cowboy
5. The Rustler's Stampede
6. The Diamond Girl
7. The Champion Cowboy
8. Under the Buffalo
9. Stolen Evidence
10. The Law Decides

== See also ==
- List of film serials
- List of film serials by studio
- List of lost films
