= The Face on the Barroom Floor (painting) =

1936 painting by Herndon Davis

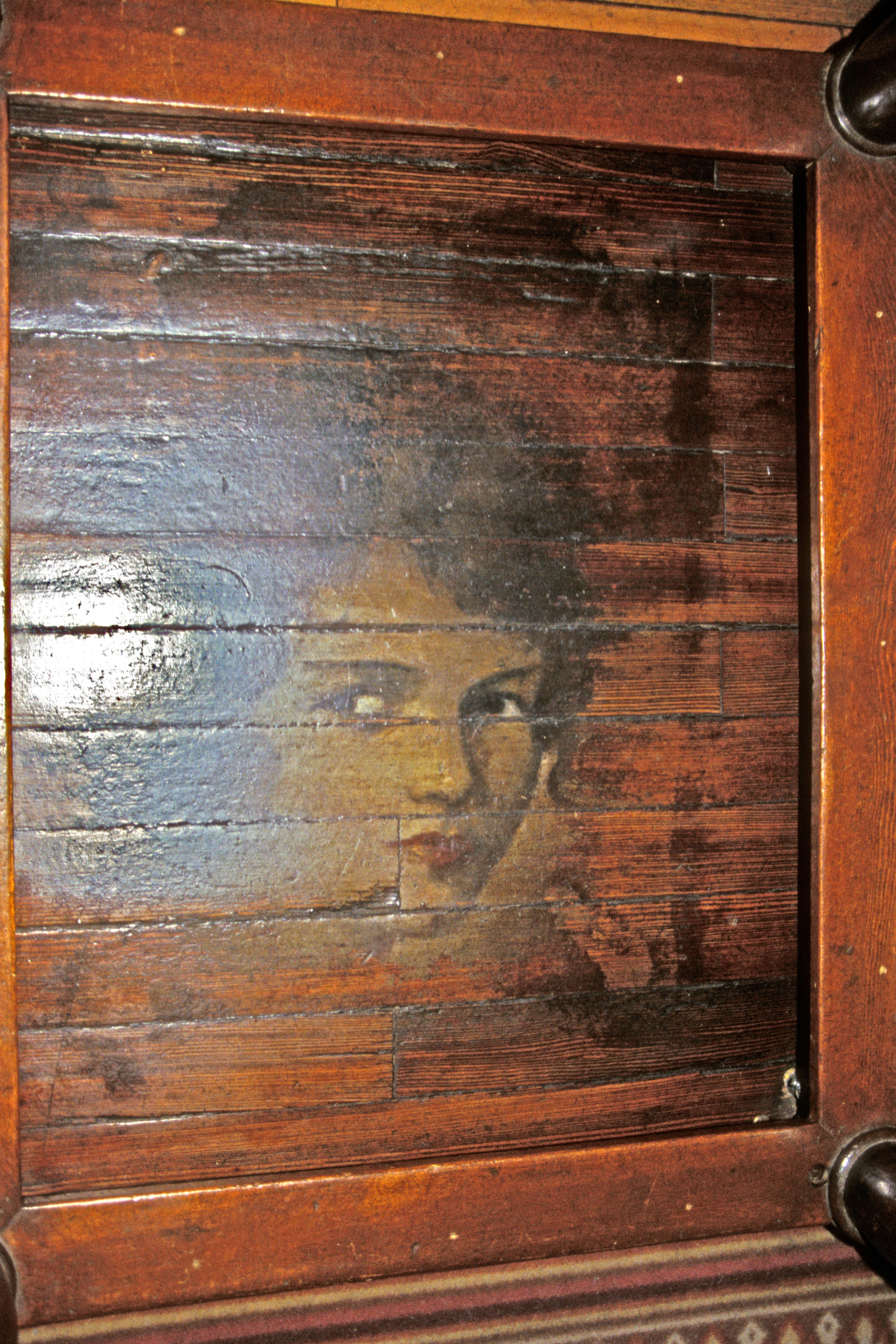
The Face on the Barroom Floor

The Face on the Barroom Floor is a painting on the floor of the Teller House Bar in Central City, Colorado, United States. It was painted in 1936 by Herndon Davis.

The Face On The Barroom Floor was referenced in the Three Stooges short "Movie Maniacs" in 1936.

== Backstory ==
Davis had been commissioned by the Central City Opera Association to paint a series of paintings for the Central City Opera House; he was also requested to do some work at the Teller House. One afternoon at the bar he became embroiled in a heated argument with Ann Evans, the project director, about the manner in which his work should be executed. The upshot of the fight was that Davis was told to quit, or else he would be fired.

According to one version of the story, the painting was the suggestion of a busboy named Joe Libby; knowing that Davis would soon be fired, he suggested that the artist "give them something to remember [him] by".

In Davis' own words:

The Central City Opera House Association hired me to do a series of paintings and sketches of the famous mining town, which they were then rejuvenating as an opera center and tourist attraction. I stayed at the Teller House while working up there, and the whim struck me to paint a face on the floor of the old Teller House barroom. In its mining boom heyday it was just such a floor as the ragged artist used in d’Arcy's famous old poem. But the hotel manager and the bartender would have none of such tomfoolery. They refused me permission to paint the face. Still the idea haunted me, and in my last night in Central City, I persuaded the bellboy Jimmy Libby to give me a hand. After midnight, when the coast was clear, we slipped down there. Jimmy held a candle for me and I painted as fast as I could. Yet it was 3 AM when I finished.

Whatever the inspiration, Davis did not sign his work, and soon the bar's owners chose to capitalize on it. They advertised the painting as that from the poem "The Face on the Barroom Floor" by Hugh Antoine D'Arcy. The actual subject of the painting is Davis' wife Edna Juanita (Cotter) Davis "Nita". She lived at 1323 Kalamath st. in Denver.

In 1951, the bar was renovated by artist Paschal Quakenbush to restore its original design, hidden under 11 layers of paint and wallpaper. As part of this renovation, the painting was covered in a sheet of glass and fenced in by a set of four posts with a banister to preserve it.

== Chamber opera ==
The Teller House painting was the inspiration for a chamber opera titled The Face on the Barroom Floor by Henry Mollicone.

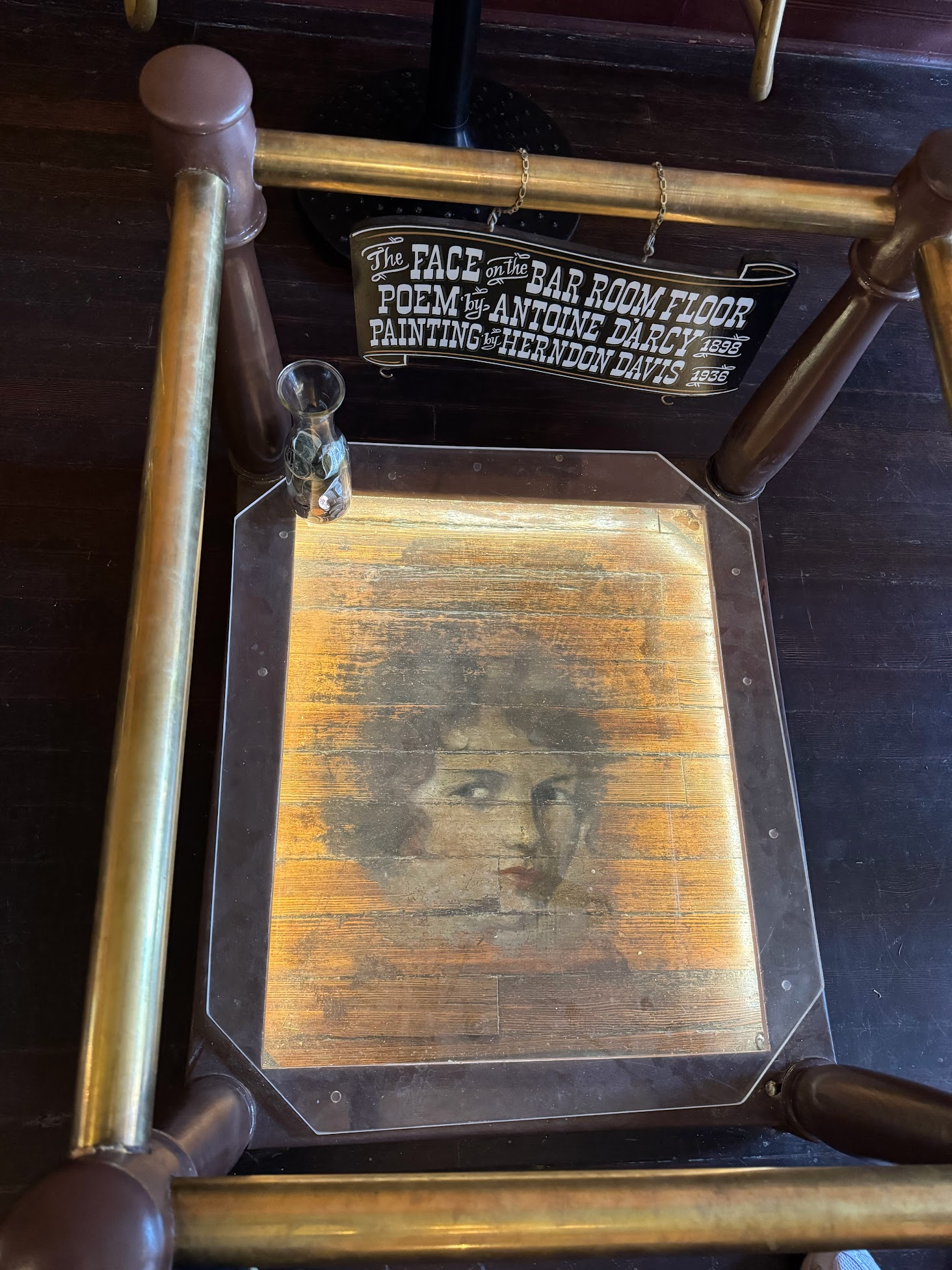
