= Gus Saville =

American actor

Gus Saville (born Augustus C. Tate; 1857 – March 25, 1934) was an American silent film actor. He mostly appeared in action films and western films.

== Early life and career ==
Saville was born in 1857 in Peekskill, New York, the son of U.S. Marshall A.C. Tate. Against his father's wishes, he performed in theatre as a young child and through his adolescence.

=== Arrest ===
In 1890, Saville was arrested for infidelity in Spokane, Washington, upon complaint of his wife.

== Film career ==
It is unknown when Saville entered the film industry, as only his feature films could be researched. During his career, Saville appeared in 17 feature films. He was best known for his roles in Tess of the Storm Country (1922), The Brand (1919), Almost a Husband (1919), and The Girl from Outside (1919).

== Personal life ==
Saville was married to Jessie Tate. He died on March 25, 1934, in Hollywood, California, at the age of 77.

== Partial filmography ==
- Almost a Husband (1919)
- Two Moons (1920)
- The Wolverine (1921)
- Tess of the Storm Country (1922)
- The Face on the Bar-Room Floor (1923)
- Idaho (1925)
- Wild West (1925)
- The High Hand (1926)
