= Idaho (serial) =

1925 film

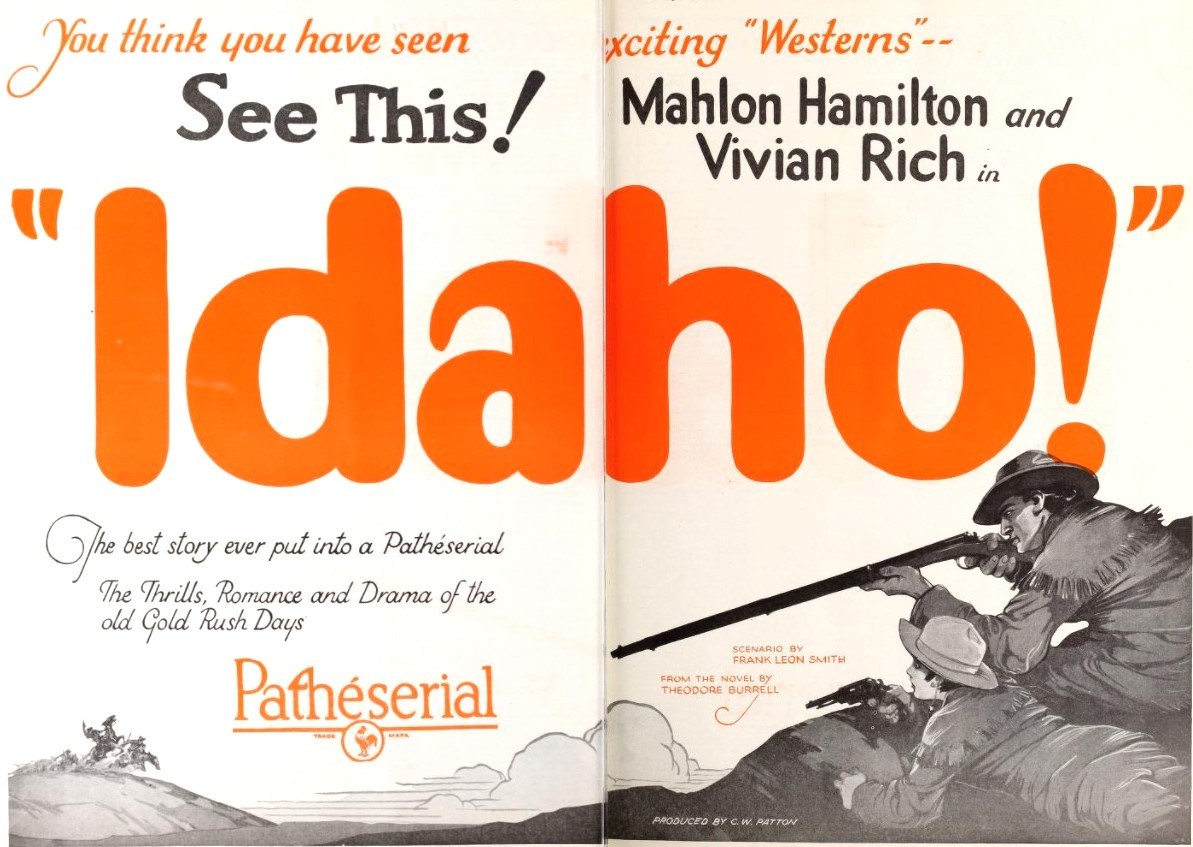
- Advertisement
- Directed by: Robert F. Hill
- Starring: Mahlon Hamilton; Vivian Rich
- Distributed by: Pathé Exchange
- Release date: March 1, 1925
- Running time: 10 episodes
- Country: United States
- Languages: Silent; English intertitles

Idaho is a 1925 American silent Western film serial directed by Robert F. Hill. The films are considered to be lost. The serial starred VIvian Rich and Mahlon Hamilton.

== Cast ==
- Mahlon Hamilton as Boston Graham
- Vivian Rich as Beth Cameron
- Frederick Vroom as David Cameron
- Frank Lackteen as Tex Osborne
- Omar Whitehead as Doctor Gibbs
- William Quinn as Ike Rogers
- Fred DeSilva as Sam Kellerman
- Charles Brinley as Yarrow
- Nelson McDowell as Angus McPherson
- William Dale as Alexander Jones
- Lillian Gale as Mrs. Jones
- Roy Bassett as The Mysterious Stranger
- Gus Saville
- Robert Irwin
- George Burton

== Chapter titles ==
1. Road Agents
2. Hands Up
3. The Stampede
4. Forbidden Testimony
5. Lawless Laws
6. Aroused
7. The Trap
8. The White Streak
9. Unmasked
10. Vigilantes

== See also ==
- List of film serials
- List of film serials by studio
- List of lost films
