= Henry Mollicone =

American composer and musical instructor (1946–2022)

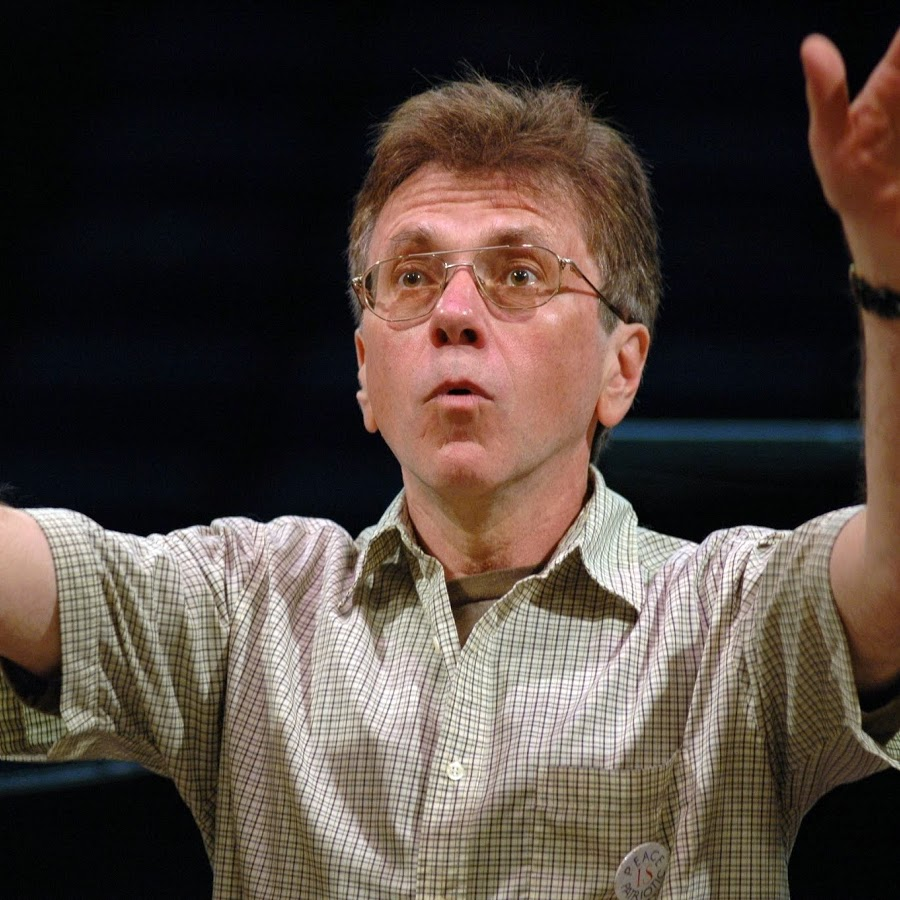
- Born: March 20, 1946
- Died: May 12, 2022 (aged 76)

Henry Mollicone (March 20, 1946 – May 12, 2022) was an American composer and musical instructor. He died on May 12, 2022, following a lengthy illness. At the time of his death, his home was in Saratoga, California.

The Washington Post called him "one of the most distinctive American opera composers".

== Career ==
Mollicone is known for his one-act operas, including Emperor Norton, Starbird, and The Mask of Evil. One of his most popular works is the one-act chamber opera The Face on the Barroom Floor. Originally commissioned in 1978 for the Central City Opera of Central City, Colorado, The Face on the Barroom Floor was inspired by the painting of the same title on the floor of the Teller House Bar in Central City. Mollicone also composed three full-length operas: Coyote Tales, Hotel Eden, and Gabriel's Daughter. In addition, he wrote works for both television and film including The Premonition (1976), as well as pieces for voice, ballet, chorus and other various chamber combinations.

== Other works ==
As a former faculty member of the Santa Clara University Department of Music, Henry Mollicone also acted as an instructor, adjudicator and collaborator. His greatest musical influences were Puccini, Verdi, Britten, and Bernstein.
