= Hugh Antoine d'Arcy =

American poet

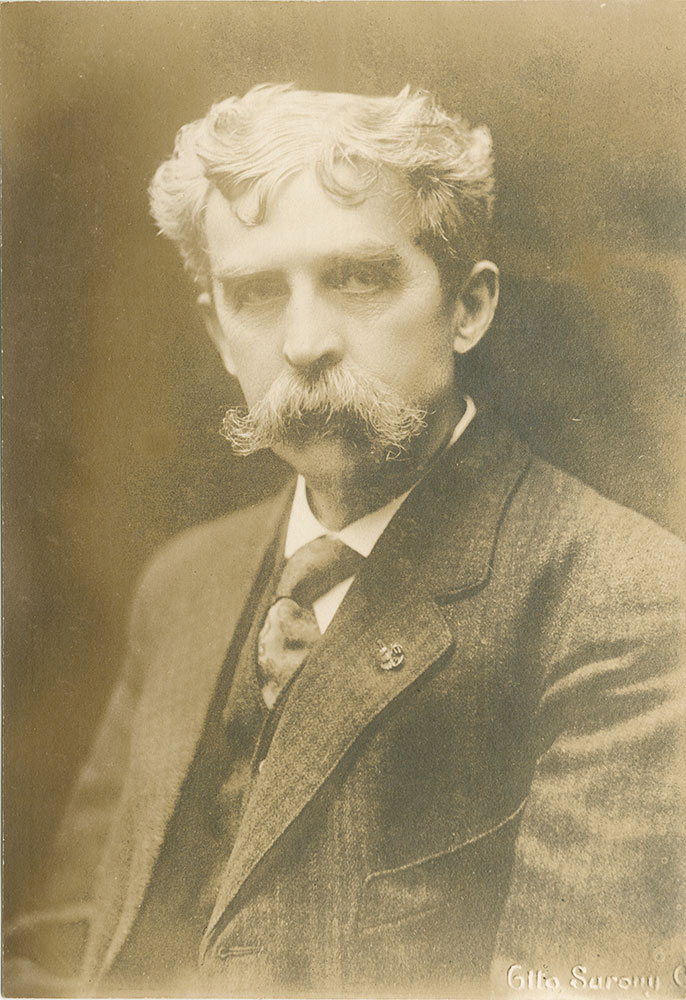
D'Arcy in the 1910s

Hugh Antoine d'Arcy (March 5, 1843 – November 11, 1925) was a French-born poet and writer and a pioneer executive in the American motion picture industry. He is known for his 1887 poem, "The Face upon the Barroom Floor", a sorrowful tale of a painter who takes to drink after his lover deserts him for the fair-haired lad in one of his portraits.

After study at England's Ipswich University, d'Arcy was a call boy and juvenile actor at the Theatre Royal in Bristol. In London, he was well known as a character actor. In 1871, d'Arcy came to America, where he became involved with the business management of stage productions and performers, including Mary Anderson, Ada Grey, DeWolf Hopper, Frank Mayo, Robert Mantell and James O'Neill.

Keystone Studios adapted the poem for a 1914 The Face on the Bar Room Floor starring Charlie Chaplin, and John Ford used it for his film, The Face on the Bar-Room Floor (1923). It was put to song by country music stars Tex Ritter on his 1959 Blood on the Saddle album and Hank Snow on his 1968 Tales of the Yukon album. D'Arcy's byline appeared in a comic book in 1954 when the poem was illustrated by Jack Davis and Basil Wolverton for Mad #10 (April 1954).

D'Arcy married the daughter of Philadelphia film mogul Siegmund Lubin and went to work as the publicity manager for his Lubin Studios. The studio used a story he had written for a 1912 film, Madeline's Christmas.

Hugh Antoine d'Arcy died of bronchitis and chronic heart problems in 1925 in New York City.
