= 1914 in film =

The year 1914 in film involved some significant events, including the debut of Cecil B. DeMille as a director.

== Events ==
- February 2 – Charlie Chaplin's first film, Making a Living, is released.
- February 7 – Release of Charlie Chaplin's second film, the Keystone comedy Kid Auto Races at Venice, in which his character of The Tramp is introduced to audiences (although first filmed in Mabel's Strange Predicament, released two days later).
- February 8 – Winsor McCay's Gertie the Dinosaur greatly advances filmed animation movement techniques.
- February 10 – Release of the film Hearts Adrift; the name of Mary Pickford, the star, is displayed above the title on movie marquees.
- February – Lewis J. Selznick and Arthur Spiegel organize the World Film Corporation, a distributor of independently produced films located in Fort Lee, New Jersey,
- March 8 – D. W. Griffith's first feature film, Judith of Bethulia, is released. It is his last production for the Biograph Company.
- March 20 – Tess of the Storm Country makes Mary Pickford an icon in the US and a celebrity around the world.
- March 31 – The serial The Perils of Pauline, starring Pearl White, is an early example of the damsel in distress in film.
- April 12 – The 3,300-seat Mark Strand Theatre opens in New York City.
- April 18 – Cabiria, directed by Giovanni Pastrone, is released in Italy, the first epic film, featuring the first extensive use of a moving camera dolly in a feature film, and introducing the long-running character Maciste.
- May 8 – Paramount Pictures is formed as a film distributor by William Wadsworth Hodkinson.
- June 13 – 1914 Lubin vault fire: a major fire destroys the main nitrate film vault of the Lubin Manufacturing Company in Philadelphia (U.S.).
- September – The Neptune Film Company opens the Neptune Studios (the first "dark stage" in England) at Borehamwood, north of London.
- November 14 – The Kalem Company of California releases the first in the adventure film series The Hazards of Helen, initially starring actress/stuntwoman Helen Holmes, releasing a new episode every Saturday until February 1917.
- November 19 – William Fox's Box Office Attractions Company releases its first production, Life's Shop Window.
- December 3 – William S. Hart appears in his first feature film, The Bargain, which makes him a star.
- December 21 – Release of the first American made feature-length comedy film, Tillie's Punctured Romance, which also contains Marie Dressler and Charlie Chaplin's feature film debuts.
- December – Chaplin joins Essanay Studios for $1,250 per week.
- Filoteo Alberini introduces a new 70 mm format, Panoramico, with the film Il sacco di Roma.

== Highest-grossing films (U.S.) ==
The top eight 1914 released films by box office gross in North America are as follows:

Highest-grossing films of 1914
| Rank | Title | Studio | Gross |
|---|---|---|---|
| 1 | The Spoilers | General | $1,000,000 |
| 2 | Dough and Dynamite | Paramount | $130,000 |
| 3 | The Virginian | Paramount | $111,518 |
| 4 | Rose of the Rancho | Paramount | $87,028 |
| 5 | The Man from Home | Paramount | $62,091 |
| 6 | What's His Name | Paramount | $61,560 |
| 7 | The Call of the North | Paramount | $52,284 |
| 8 | The Ghost Breaker | Paramount | $50,136 |

== Notable films ==
Films produced in the United States unless stated otherwise

=== A ===
- An American Citizen (lost), directed by J. Searle Dawley, starring John Barrymore
- The Avenging Conscience, directed by D. W. Griffith, starring Blanche Sweet and Henry B. Walthall, based on the works of Edgar Allan Poe

=== B ===
- Back to the Farm, directed by Joseph Levering, starring Oliver Hardy
- The Bargain, directed by Reginald Barker, starring William S. Hart
- The Battle of the Sexes (incomplete), directed by D. W. Griffith, starring Donald Crisp and Lillian Gish
- Between Showers, directed by Henry Lehrman, starring Charlie Chaplin and Ford Sterling
- Brewster's Millions (lost), directed by Oscar Apfel and Cecil B. DeMille, based on the 1902 novel by George Barr McCutcheon
- Brute Force, directed by D. W. Griffith, starring Robert Harron and Mae Marsh
- A Busy Day, directed by and starring Charlie Chaplin
- By the Sun's Rays, directed by Charles Giblyn, starring Lon Chaney

=== C ===
- Cabiria, directed by Giovanni Pastrone – (Italy)
- The Call of the North, directed by Oscar Apfel and Cecil B. DeMille
- Caught in a Cabaret, directed by and starring Mabel Normand, with Charlie Chaplin
- Caught in the Rain, directed by and starring Charlie Chaplin
- A Christmas Carol, directed by Harold M. Shaw, based on the 1843 novella by Charles Dickens – (GB)
- Cinderella, directed by James Kirkwood Sr., starring Mary Pickford, based on the classic fairy tale
- Cruel, Cruel Love, directed by George Nichols and Mack Sennett, starring Charlie Chaplin

=== D ===
- Demolition of the Monument at San Stefano (Ayastefanos'taki Rus Abidesinin Yıkılışı), directed by Fuat Uzkınay – (Ottoman Empire)
- Dough and Dynamite, directed by and starring Charlie Chaplin

=== E ===
- Evangeline (lost), directed by Edward P. Sullivan and William Cavanaugh – (Canada)
- The Exploits of Elaine, film serial directed by Louis J. Gasnier and George B. Seitz, starring Pearl White

=== F ===
- The Face on the Bar Room Floor, directed by and starring Charlie Chaplin
- Fantômas (parts 4 & 5), film serial directed by Louis Feuillade, based on the true crime novels by Pierre Souvestre and Marcel Allain – (France)
- The Fatal Mallet, directed by Mack Sennett, starring Charlie Chaplin and Mabel Normand
- Figures de cire (The Man with Wax Faces), directed by Maurice Tourneur – (France)
- A Film Johnnie, directed by George Nichols, starring Charlie Chaplin, Fatty Arbuckle and Mabel Normand
- A Florida Enchantment, directed by Sidney Drew, starring Edith Storey

=== G ===
- Gentlemen of Nerve, directed by and starring Charlie Chaplin, with Mabel Normand
- Gertie the Dinosaur, animated film directed by Winsor McCay
- Getting Acquainted, directed by and starring Charlie Chaplin, with Mabel Normand
- The Ghost Breaker (lost), directed by Cecil B. DeMille and Oscar C. Apfel, starring H. B. Warner
- A Good Little Devil (incomplete), directed by Edwin S. Porter, starring Mary Pickford

=== H ===
- The Hazards of Helen, film serial directed by J. P. McGowan and J. Gunnis Davis, starring Helen Holmes
- His Favorite Pastime, directed by George Nichols, starring Charlie Chaplin and Fatty Arbuckle
- His Majesty, the Scarecrow of Oz, directed by J. Farrell MacDonald, based on the 1900 novel The Wonderful Wizard of Oz by L. Frank Baum
- His Musical Career, directed by and starring Charlie Chaplin
- His New Profession, directed by and starring Charlie Chaplin, with Fatty Arbuckle
- His Prehistoric Past, directed by and starring Charlie Chaplin
- His Trysting Place, directed by and starring Charlie Chaplin, with Mabel Normand
- Home, Sweet Home, directed by D. W. Griffith, starring Henry B. Walthall, Lillian Gish and Dorothy Gish
- Der Hund von Baskerville (The Hound of the Baskervilles), directed by Rudolf Meinert, based on the 1902 novel by Arthur Conan Doyle – (Germany)

=== I ===
- In the Land of the Head Hunters, directed by Edward S. Curtis

=== J ===
- Judith of Bethulia, directed by D. W. Griffith, starring Blanche Sweet and Henry B. Walthall

=== K ===
- Kid Auto Races at Venice, directed by Henry Lehrman, starring Charlie Chaplin
- The Knockout, directed by Charles Avery, starring Fatty Arbuckle and Charlie Chaplin

=== L ===
- Laughing Gas, directed by and starring Charlie Chaplin
- The Life of General Villa (lost), starring Pancho Villa as himself, with Raoul Walsh, co-produced by D. W. Griffith
- Life's Shop Window (lost), directed by J. Gordon Edwards, first film produced by William Fox

=== M ===
- Mabel at the Wheel, directed by Mack Sennett, starring Mabel Normand and Charlie Chaplin
- Mabel's Blunder, directed by and starring Mabel Normand
- Mabel's Busy Day, directed by and starring Mabel Normand, with Charlie Chaplin
- Mabel's Married Life, directed by and starring Charlie Chaplin, with Mabel Normand
- Mabel's Strange Predicament, directed by and starring Mabel Normand, with Charlie Chaplin
- The Magic Cloak of Oz, directed by J. Farrell MacDonald, starring Mildred Harris, based on the 1905 novel Queen Zixi of Ix by L. Frank Baum
- Making a Living, directed by Henry Lehrman, the first film starring Charlie Chaplin
- The Man from Home, directed by Cecil B. DeMille
- The Masquerader, directed by and starring Charlie Chaplin, with Fatty Arbuckle
- The Million Dollar Mystery (lost), film serial directed by Howell Hansel, starring Florence La Badie
- Mrs. Wiggs of the Cabbage Patch, directed by Harold Entwistle

=== N ===
- The New Janitor, directed by and starring Charlie Chaplin

=== O ===
- The Oubliette, directed by Charles Giblyn, starring Lon Chaney

=== P ===
- The Patchwork Girl of Oz, directed by J. Farrell MacDonald, based on the 1913 novel by L. Frank Baum
- The Perils of Pauline, film serial directed by Louis J. Gasnier, starring Pearl White
- The Property Man, directed by and starring Charlie Chaplin

=== R ===
- Recreation, directed by and starring Charlie Chaplin
- Rose of the Rancho, directed by Cecil B. DeMille, starring Bessie Barriscale
- The Rounders, directed by and starring Charlie Chaplin, with Fatty Arbuckle

=== S ===
- Salomy Jane, directed by William Nigh and Lucius J. Henderson, starring Beatriz Michelena
- The Spoilers, directed by Colin Campbell, starring William Farnum and Kathlyn Williams
- The Squaw Man, directed by Oscar Apfel and Cecil B. DeMille, starring Dustin Farnum
- The Stain, directed by Frank Powell, starring Theda Bara
- The Star Boarder, directed by George Nichols, starring Charlie Chaplin
- A Study in Scarlet (lost), directed by George Pearson, based on the 1887 novel by Arthur Conan Doyle – (GB)

=== T ===
- Tango Tangles, directed by Mack Sennett, starring Charlie Chaplin, Fatty Arbuckle and Ford Sterling
- Tess of the Storm Country, directed by Edwin S. Porter, starring Mary Pickford
- Those Love Pangs, directed by and starring Charlie Chaplin
- Tillie's Punctured Romance, directed by Mack Sennett, starring Marie Dressler, Mabel Normand, Charlie Chaplin and the Keystone Cops
- Twenty Minutes of Love, directed by and starring Charlie Chaplin

=== U ===
- Uncle Tom's Cabin, directed by William Robert Daly, starring Sam Lucas, based on the 1852 novel by Harriet Beecher Stowe

=== V ===
- The Virginian, directed by Cecil B. DeMille, starring Dustin Farnum, based on the 1902 novel by Owen Wister

=== W ===
- What's His Name, directed by Cecil B. DeMille, starring Max Figman and Lolita Robertson
- The Wishing Ring: An Idyll of Old England, directed by Maurice Tourneur, starring Vivian Martin
- The Wrath of the Gods, directed by Reginald Barker, starring Sessue Hayakawa and Frank Borzage

== 1914 film release dates ==
- January – The House of Bondage, a lost 1914 silent film drama directed by Pierce Kingsley and starring Lottie Pickford.
- January 3 – Engelein, German silent comedy film written and directed by Urban Gad
- January 12 – Fantomas Part Four: Fantômas Contre Fantômas (Parts 1 through 3 of this serial were released in 1913, while Parts 4 & 5 were released in 1914)
- January 14 – Captive Souls (Hungarian: Rablélek), a Hungarian film directed by Michael Curtiz
- January 22 – Absinthe, American silent drama film starring King Baggot and Leah Baird and directed by Herbert Brenon
- February 2 – Making a Living, the first film starring Charlie Chaplin.
- February 5 – O Mimi San, starring Sessue Hayakawa, Tsuru Aoki and Mildred Harris
- February 7 – Kid Auto Races at Venice, starring Charlie Chaplin
- February 8 – Gertie the Dinosaur, an animated film that incorporated many cinematic innovations
- February 9 – Mabel's Strange Predicament, starring Mabel Normand and Charlie Chaplin
- February 12 – The Squaw Man, directed by Oscar Apfel and Cecil B. DeMille, starring Dustin Farnum
- March 1 – How Moscha Came Back, silent film comedy short directed by Phillips Smalley
- March 8 – Judith of Bethulia, directed by D. W. Griffith, starring Blanche Sweet
- March 24 – The Avenging Conscience, directed by D. W. Griffith, starring Blanche Sweet and Henry B. Walthall; loosely based on the works of Edgar Allan Poe
- March 31 – The Perils of Pauline, (serial), starring Pearl White
- April 6 – The Old Curiosity Shop directed by Thomas Bentley, starring Alma Taylor
- April 15 – Brewster's Millions
- April 18 – Cabiria, directed by Giovanni Pastrone
- April 18 – Mabel at the Wheel, starring Mabel Normand, Harry McCoy, and Charlie Chaplin
- April 23 – A Little Madonna
- May ? – Fantomas Part Five: Le Faux Magistrat
- May 9 – The Life of General Villa
- May 11 – The Master Mind
- May – Mr. Barnes of New York
- June 8 – The Wrath of Gods, starring Sessue Hayakawa, Tsuru Aoki and Frank Borzage
- June 12 – Der Hund von Baskerville aka The Hound of the Baskervilles (Germany/ Vitascope), directed by Rudolf Meinert, written by Richard Oswald, starring Alwin Neuß and Hanni Weiss; originally released in two parts, later edited down into a feature version.
- June 15 – The Only Son
- June 22 – The Million Dollar Mystery, (serial), starring Florence La Badie
- July 13 – My Official Wife, starring Clara Kimball Young
- July 13 – The Man on the Box
- July 17 – The Stain, starring Theda Bara
- July 22 – By the Sun's Rays
- August 10 – The Call of the North, starring Robert Edeson
- September 7 – The Virginian, starring Dustin Farnum
- September 22 – Ireland a Nation
- September 23 – The Aztec Treasure
- September 28 – The Patchwork Girl of Oz
- September 28 – The Magic Cloak of Oz, starring Mildred Harris
- October 14 – His Majesty, the Scarecrow of Oz, starring Mildred Harris
- October 14 – Mabel's Blunder
- October 22 – What's His Name, starring Max Figman
- November 2 – Salomy Jane
- November 7 – The Hazards of Helen (serial), starring Helen Holmes
- November 7 – His Musical Career, starring Charlie Chaplin
- November 9 – The Man from Home
- November 9 – The Wishing Ring
- November 13 – Demolition of the Monument at San Stefano, directed by Fuat Uzkınay, considered to be the first Turkish movie – (Ottoman Empire)
- November 15 – Rose of the Rancho, starring Bessie Barriscale
- November 19 – Life's Shop Window, first film produced by William Fox's Box Office Attractions Company, the forerunner to Fox Film
- December 7 – The Ghost Breaker (Paramount) directed by Cecil B. DeMille and Oscar C. Apfel, starring H. B. Warner and Rita Stanwood; remade in 1922 and again in 1940.
- December 7 – His Prehistoric Past, written, directed, and starring Charlie Chaplin
- December 7 – In the Land of the Head Hunters
- December 14 – The Last Egyptian, produced and written by L. Frank Baum, directed by Joseph Farrell MacDonald (who also starred), also starring Howard Davies and Jefferson Osborne.
- December 21 – Tillie's Punctured Romance, directed by Mack Sennett, starring Marie Dressler, Mabel Normand and Charlie Chaplin. First comedy feature film.
- December 28 – A Study in Scarlet, directed by George Pearson; based on the Arthur Conan Doyle story
- December 28 – Cinderella, starring Mary Pickford
- December 28 – The Exploits of Elaine, (serial), directed by Louis Gasnier and George B. Seitz, starring Pearl White and Sheldon Lewis

== Short film series ==
- Broncho Billy Anderson (1910–1916)
- Harold Lloyd (1913–1921)
- Charlie Chaplin (1914–1923)

== Births ==
- January 5 – George Reeves, American actor (died 1959)
- January 6
  - David Bruce, American film actor (died 1976)
  - Danny Thomas, American comedian, actor, singer, producer, and philanthropist (died 1991)
- January 13 – Osa Massen, Danish actress (died 2006)
- January 14 – Harold Russell, American actor (died 2002)
- January 15 – Dimples Cooper, Filipina actress (died 1960)
- January 17 – Howard Marion-Crawford, English character actor (died 1969)
- January 28 – Tom Neal, American actor and boxer (died 1972)
- January 30 – John Ireland, Canadian-American actor and film director (died 1992)
- January 31 – Carey Loftin, American stuntman, stunt coordinator and actor (died 1997)
- February 3 – Mary Carlisle, American actress, singer and dancer (died 2018)
- February 6 – Thurl Ravenscroft, American actor and bass singer. (died 2005)
- February 15 – Kevin McCarthy, American actor (died 2010)
- February 17
  - Arthur Kennedy, American actor (died 1990)
  - Wayne Morris, American actor (died 1959)
- February 18 – Mahmoud Zulfikar, Egyptian film director, producer, screenwriter, and actor. (died 1970)
- February 21 – Zachary Scott, American actor (died 1965)
- February 26 – Robert Alda, American actor (died 1986)
- March 2
  - Hansi Knoteck, Austrian actress (died 2014)
  - Martin Ritt, American director, producer, and actor (died 1990)
- March 3 – Charlotte Henry, American actress (died 1980)
- March 5 – Fred Clark, American character actor (died 1968)
- March 8 – Yves Brainville, French film and television actor (died 1993)
- March 20 – Wendell Corey, American actor (died 1968)
- March 27 – Richard Denning, American actor (died 1998)
- April 2 – Alec Guinness, English actor (died 2000)
- April 4 – Richard Coogan, American actor (died 2014)
- April 14 – John Hubbard, American actor (died 1988)
- April 16 – John Hodiak, American actor (died 1955)
- April 24 – Larry J. Blake, American actor (died 1982)
- April 30 – Christopher Rhodes, English actor (died 1964)
- May 5 – Tyrone Power, American actor (died 1958)
- May 10 – Charles McGraw, American actor (died 1980)
- May 18 – Robert J. Wilke, American film and television actor (died 1989)
- May 19 – Beverly Roberts, American actress and singer (died 2009)
- May 24 – Lilli Palmer, German actress and writer (died 1986)
- May 31 – Hannes Schiel, Austrian actor (died 2017)
- June 7 – Khwaja Ahmad Abbas, Indian film director, screenwriter, novelist, and journalist. (died 1987)
- June 11 – Gerald Mohr, American character actor (died 1968)
- June 12 – William Lundigan, American actor (died 1975)
- June 18 – E. G. Marshall, American actor (died 1998)
- June 19 – Harry Lauter, American character actor (died 1990)
- June 21 – Wensley Pithey, South African character actor (died 1993)
- July 2 – Ethelreda Leopold, American actress (died 1998)
- July 10 – Rempo Urip, Indonesian director (died 2001)
- July 17 – Klári Tolnay, Hungarian actress (died 1998)
- July 20 – Masa Niemi, Finnish comic actor (died 1960)
- July 23 – Julie Mitchum, American actress (died 2003)
- July 25 – Woody Strode, American athlete, actor, and author (died 1994)
- July 27 – Gusti Huber, Austrian-born American actress (died 1993)
- July 29
  - Irwin Corey, American actor and stand-up comedian (died 2017)
  - Alexander Gauge, British character actor (died 1960)
- July 30 – Brian Worth, English actor (died 1978)
- July 31 – Louis de Funès, French actor and comedian (died 1983)
- August 2 – Beatrice Straight, American actress (died 2001)
- August 5 – Parley Baer, American actor (died 2002)
- August 13 – Norman Spencer, British film producer, production manager, screenwriter, and supercentenarian. (died 2024)
- August 14 – Andrea Leeds, American actress (died 1984)
- August 31 – Richard Basehart, American actor (died 1984)
- September 9 – James Seay, American character actor (died 1992)
- September 12 – Desmond Llewelyn, Welsh actor (died 1999)
- September 20 – Kenneth More English actor (died 1982)
- September 27 – Sophie Sooäär, Estonian actress and singer (died 1996)
- October 1 – Maciej Maciejewski, Polish screen and stage actor (died 2018)
- October 9 – Edward Andrews, American actor (died 1985)
- October 26 – Jackie Coogan, American actor and comedian (died 1984)
- October 28 – Dody Goodman, American character actress (died 2008)
- October 30 – Anna Wing, British actress (died 2013)
- November 2 – Ray Walston, American actor (died 2001)
- November 6 – Jonathan Harris, American character actor (died 2002)
- November 8 – Norman Lloyd, American actor, producer and director (died 2021)
- November 9
  - Alan Caillou, English actor and screenwriter (died 2006)
  - Hedy Lamarr, Austrian-American actress and inventor (died 2000)
- November 10 – William Henry, American actor (died 1982)
- November 13
  - Amelia Bence, Argentine actress (died 2016)
  - Henri Langlois, French film preservationist (died 1977)
  - Alberto Lattuada, Italian director (died 2005)
- November 20 – Richard Fiske, American actor (died 1944)
- November 22 – Frank Graham, American radio announcer and voice actor (died 1950)
- November 23
  - Roger Avon, British film and television actor (died 1998)
  - Ellen Drew, American actress (died 2003)
- December 2 – Bill Erwin, American actor (died 2010)
- December 10 – Dorothy Lamour, American actress and singer (died 1996)
- December 13 – Larry Parks, American actor (died 1975)
- December 22 – Emil Sitka, American actor (died 1998)
- December 26 – Richard Widmark, American actor and producer (died 2008)
- December 28 – Lee Bowman, American actor (died 1979)

== Deaths ==
- January 9 – Gladys Rankin, American actress as Mrs. Sidney Drew; writer as George Cameron
- January 11 – William A. Russell, 35, American actor
- March 25 – Frédéric Mistral, 83, French writer, Mirèio
- June 19 – Brandon Thomas, 65, British writer, Charley's Aunt
- July 1
  - Grace McHugh, American actress died while filming the movie Across the Border
  - Owen Carter, American cinematographer died while trying to save Grace McHugh, Across the Border
- August 21 – Charles J. Hite, 38, President and CEO of Thanhouser Film Corporation
- August 22 – David Davie Shelby, 66, actor.
- October 24 – Gustav Wied, 56, Danish playwright and novelist
- November 14 – Stellan Rye, 34, Danish film director, Dur Verfuhrte, Evinrude, The Student of Prague

== Film debuts ==
- Mary Alden – The Battle of the Sexes
- Mary Anderson – My Official Wife
- Theda Bara – The Stain
- Ethel Barrymore – The Nightingale
- John Barrymore – An American Citizen
- Lionel Barrymore – Judith of Bethulia
- George Bellamy – The Third String
- Belle Bennett – Mrs. Wiggs of the Cabbage Patch
- Milton Berle – The Perils of Pauline
- Charles Brinley – The Trey o' Hearts
- Mathilde Brundage – The Crucible
- Barbara Castleton – The Ordeal
- Charlie Chaplin – Making a Living
- Edythe Chapman – Richelieu
- Marguerite Clark – Wildflower
- Walter Connolly – The Marked Woman
- Donald Crisp – The Battle of the Sexes
- Dorothy Dalton – Pierre of the Plains
- Harry Davenport – Damon and Pythias
- Cecil B. DeMille (director) – The Squaw Man
- William Elmer – The Squaw Man
- Dustin Farnum – Soldiers of Fortune
- William Farnum – The Spoilers
- Maude Turner Gordon – The Idler
- Judd Green – The Third String
- Alan Hale Sr. – Jane Eyre
- Creighton Hale – The Million Dollar Mystery
- Juanita Hansen – The Patchwork Girl of Oz
- William S. Hart – The Bargain
- Raymond Hatton – The Squaw Man
- Sessue Hayakawa – The Wrath of the Gods
- Jack Holt – Salomy Jane
- Emil Jannings – Im Schützengraben
- Eulalie Jensen – St. Elmo
- Winifred Kingston – Soldiers of Fortune
- Dick La Reno – John Barleycorn
- George Larkin – The Trey o' Hearts
- Lucien Littlefield – Rose of the Rancho
- Cleo Madison – The Dead End
- George Majeroni – The Sign of the Cross
- Vivian Martin – The Wishing Ring: An Idyll of Old England
- Jack McDonald – The Spoilers
- Adolphe Menjou – The Man Behind the Door
- Tom Mix – In the Days of the Thundering Herd
- Fred Montague – The Squaw Man
- Blanche Montel – Loyalty
- Musidora – Severo Torelli
- Pola Negri – Slave of Sin
- James Neill – The Man on the Box
- Wheeler Oakman – The Spoilers
- Doris Pawn – The Trey o' Hearts
- Tyrone Power, Sr. – Aristocracy
- Grete Reinwald – Ein Sommernachtstraum in unserer Zeit
- Charles Richman – The Man from Home
- Cleo Ridgely – The Spoilers
- Theodore Roberts – The Call of the North
- Charlie Ruggles – The Patchwork Girl of Oz
- Monroe Salisbury – The Squaw Man
- Milton Sills – The Pit
- Russell Simpson – The Virginian
- Frank Stanmore – The Third String
- Slim Summerville – Tillie's Punctured Romance
- Ethel Grey Terry – The Sign of the Cross
- Rudolph Valentino – My Official Wife
- May Wallace – The Million Dollar Mystery
- H. B. Warner – The Lost Paradise
- Charles Wellesley – My Official Wife
