= André de Lorde =

French playwright

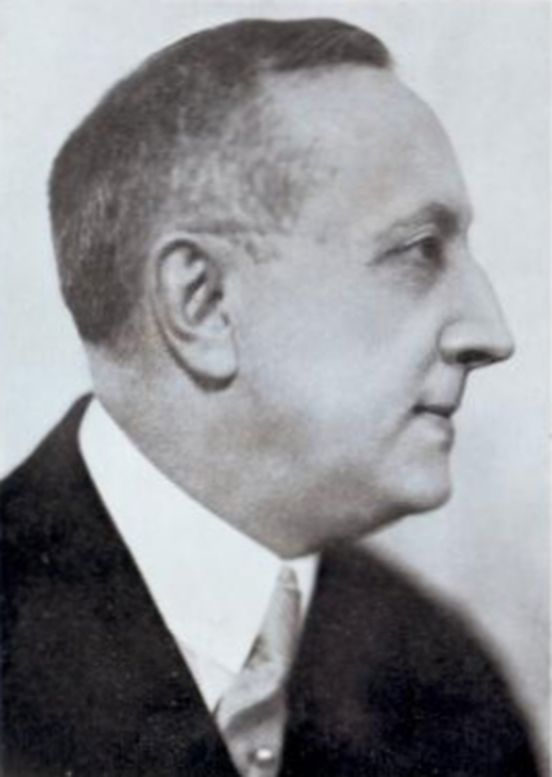
André de Lorde

André de Latour, comte de Lorde (1869–1942) was a French playwright, the main author of the Grand Guignol plays from 1901 to 1926. His evening career was as a dramatist of terror; during daytimes he worked as a librarian in the Bibliothèque de l'Arsenal. He wrote 150 plays, all of them devoted mainly to the exploitation of terror and insanity, and a few novels. For plays the subject matter of which concerned mental illness he sometimes collaborated with psychologist Alfred Binet, the developer of IQ testing.

During the 1920s de Lorde was elected "Prince of Fear" (Prince de la Terreur) by his peers.

== Filmography ==
- The Lonely Villa, directed by D. W. Griffith (1909, short film, based on the play Au Telephone)
- The System of Doctor Goudron, directed by Maurice Tourneur (1913, short film, based on the play Le Système du docteur Goudron et du professeur Plume)
- La Double Existence du docteur Morart, directed by Jacques Grétillat (1920, based on the play La Double Existence du docteur Morart)
- Le Château de la mort lente, directed by Émile-Bernard Donatien (1925, based on the play Le Château de la mort lente)
- Attaque nocturne, directed by Marc Allégret (1931, short film, based on the play Attaque nocturne)
- L'Homme mystérieux, directed by Maurice Tourneur (1934, short film, based on the play L'Homme mystérieux)
- Gosses de misère, directed by Georges Gauthier (1933, based on the play Bagnes d'enfants)

=== Screenwriter ===
- Figures de cire, directed by Maurice Tourneur (1914, short film)
- Li-Hang le cruel, directed by Édouard-Émile Violet (1920)
- Le Roman d'un spahi, directed by Michel Bernheim (1936)
