= Mary Watts =

Mary Watts may refer to:

- Mary Seton Watts (1849–1938), English architect, artist and social reformer
- Mary Stanbery Watts (1868–1958), American novelist

== See also ==
- Mary Watts-Tobin (born 1936), British fencer
