= List of French films of 1914 =

A list of films produced in France in 1914.

Title	Director	Cast	Genre	Notes
Le 2 août 1914				
L'Affaire d'Orcival				
L'Affaire des cinq				
L'Alibi				
L'Ambition de Madame Cabassoul				
L'Amour passe				
L'Amoureuse aventure				
L'Anglais tel que Max le parle				
L'Apprentie				
L'Argent des pauvres				
L'Arriviste				
Arsène Lupin contre Ganimard				
Figures de cire	Maurice Tourneur		Horror	
Onésime et le drame de famille	Jean Durand			

== See also ==
- 1914 in France
