= Rose of the Rancho =

Rose of the Rancho may refer to:

- The Rose of the Rancho, a 1906 play by David Belasco and Richard Walton Tully
- Rose of the Rancho (1914 film), an American silent Western film based on the play
- Rose of the Rancho (1936 film), an American action film based on the play
