= The Gaieties of the Squadron =

- Directed by: Joseph Faivre; Maurice Tourneur
- Written by: Georges Courteline (play); Maurice Tourneur
- Production company: Société Française des Films Éclair
- Distributed by: Société Française des Films Éclair
- Release date: 24 October 1913
- Country: France
- Languages: Silent; French intertitles

The Gaieties of the Squadron (French: Les gaîtés de l'escadron) is a 1913 French silent comedy film directed by Joseph Faivre and Maurice Tourneur and starring Edmond Duquesne, Henry Roussel and Henri Gouget. It is a military-based farce adapted from the popular play by Georges Courteline. Tourneur later remade it as a sound film Fun in the Barracks (1932).

== Plot ==
The life of disorderly soldiers in the barracks dealing with daily routines.

== Cast ==
- Edmond Duquesne as Capitaine Hurtulet
- Henry Roussel as Le général
- Henri Gouget as L'adjudant Flick
- Pierre Delmonde
- Maurice de Féraudy
- Charles Krauss
- Fernande Petit
- Polaire

== Bibliography ==
- Waldman, Harry. Maurice Tourneur: The Life and Films. McFarland, 2001.
