= John van den Broek =

Dutch cinematographer

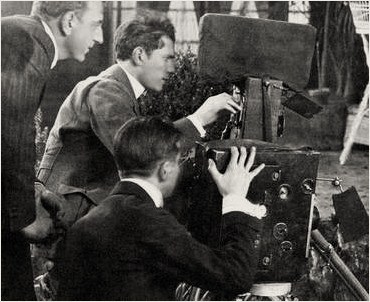
- van den Broek, kneeling, with director Maurice Tourneur on left and cinematographer Lucien Andriot sitting at camera. On the set of The Poor Little Rich Girl
- Born: ?1895; Rotterdam, Netherlands
- Died: 29 June 1918; Schooner Head, Maine
- Occupation: Cinematographer
- Years active: 1914-1918

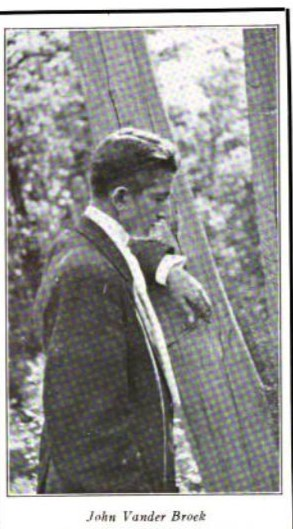

John van den Broek (1895 – 29 June 1918) was a Dutch born cinematographer. He is remembered primarily for his work on the films of Maurice Tourneur. Van den Broek died at 23 while filming the Tourneur directed film Woman in 1918. According to Tourneur's biographer Harry Waldman, Van den Broek was on a cliff in Maine filming some large waves when he got caught in a series of waves that carried him out to sea. His body was never recovered.

== Partial filmography ==
- The Wishing Ring (1914)
- The Rail Rider (1916)
- The Pride of the Clan (1917)
- The Poor Little Rich Girl (1917)
- The Undying Flame (1917)
- The Law of the Land (1917)
- Barbary Sheep (1917)
- The Rise of Jennie Cushing (1917)
- Rose of the World (1918)
- The Blue Bird (1918)
- Prunella (1918)
- A Doll's House (1918)
- The Sporting Life (1918)
