= A Wide Open Town =

1922 silent film

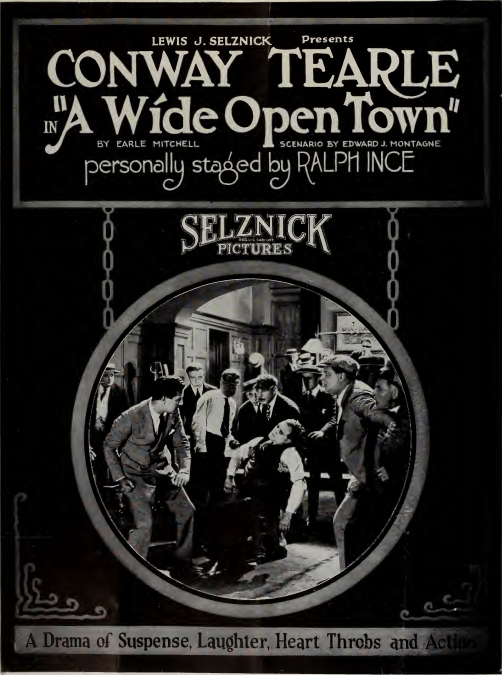
- Directed by: Ralph Ince
- Written by: Earle Mitchell; Edward J. Montagne
- Produced by: Lewis J. Selznick
- Starring: Conway Tearle; Faire Binney; James Seeley
- Cinematography: William F. Wagner
- Production company: Selznick Pictures
- Distributed by: Select Pictures
- Release date: February 19, 1922
- Running time: 50 minutes
- Country: United States
- Languages: Silent; English intertitles

A Wide Open Town is a 1922 American silent drama film directed by Ralph Ince and starring Conway Tearle, Faire Binney and James Seeley.

It is unknown whether the film survives.

== Cast ==
- Conway Tearle as Billy Clifford
- Faire Binney as Helen Morely
- James Seeley as Mayor Morely
- Harry Tighe as Tug Wilson
- Claude Brooks as Fred Tatum
- Ned Sparks as Si Ryan
- Danny Hayes as Rufe Nimbo
- John P. Wade as Gov. Talbot
- Alice May as Mrs. Tatum
- Bobby Connelly as Gov. Talbot as a boy
- Jerry Devine as Billy Clifford as a boy

== Bibliography ==
- Munden, Kenneth White. The American Film Institute Catalog of Motion Pictures Produced in the United States, Part 1. University of California Press, 1997.
