= Here Comes the Bride (1919 film) =

1919 film by John S. Robertson

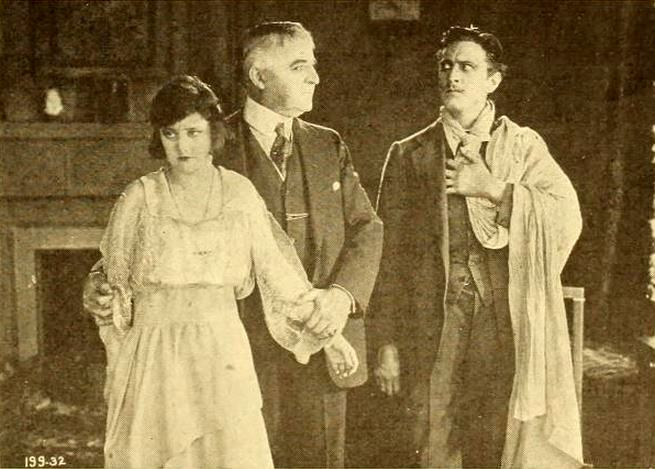
- Film still showing (from left) Faire Binney, Frank Losee, and Jack Barrymore
- Directed by: John S. Robertson
- Written by: Charles Whittaker (scenario
- Based on: Here Comes the Bride by Max Marcin and Roy Atwell
- Produced by: Adolph Zukor; Jesse Lasky
- Starring: John Barrymore; Faire Binney
- Cinematography: Hal Young
- Distributed by: Paramount Pictures
- Release date: January 19, 1919
- Running time: 5 reels; (4,436 feet)
- Country: United States
- Languages: Silent; English intertitles

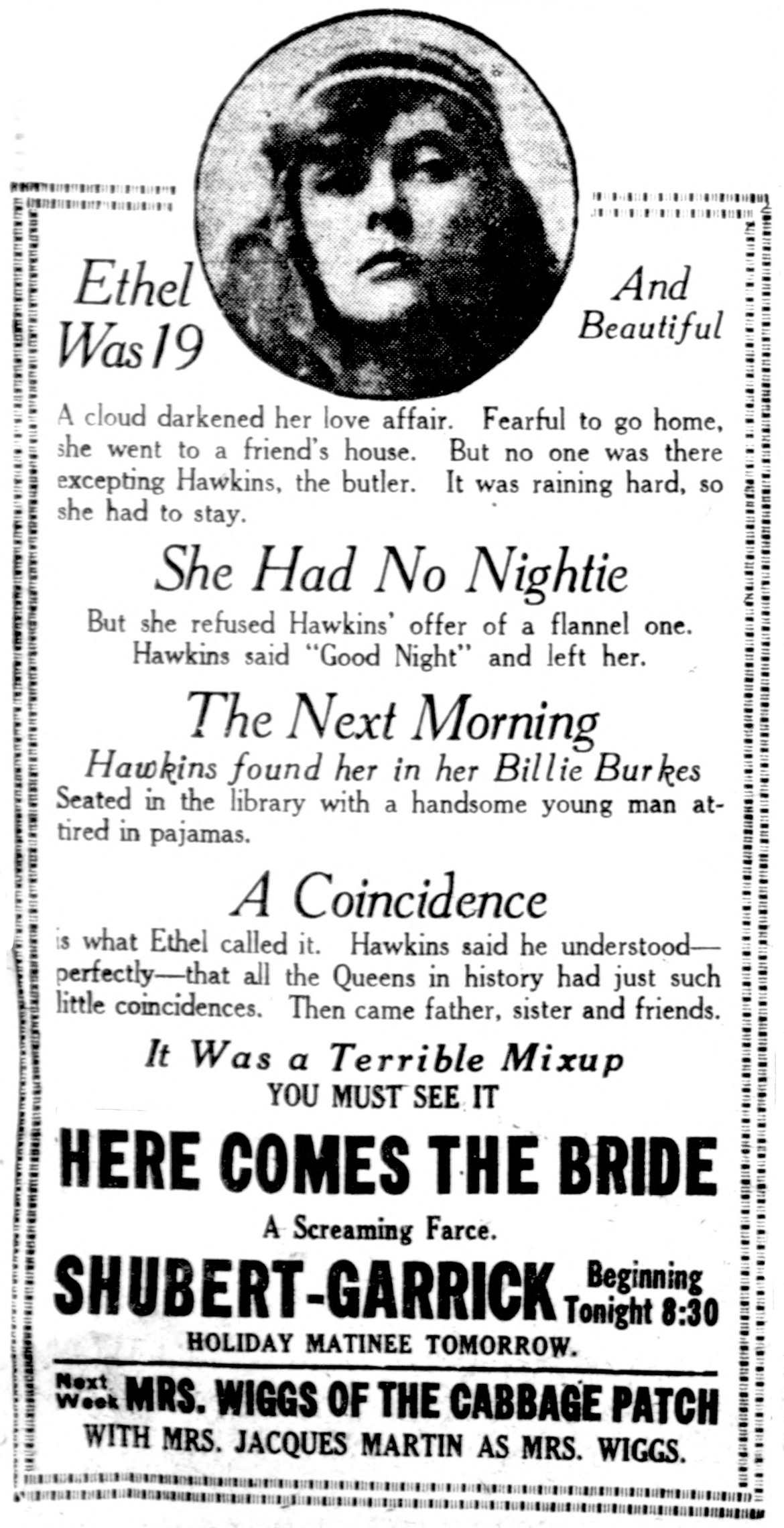
Newspaper advertisement

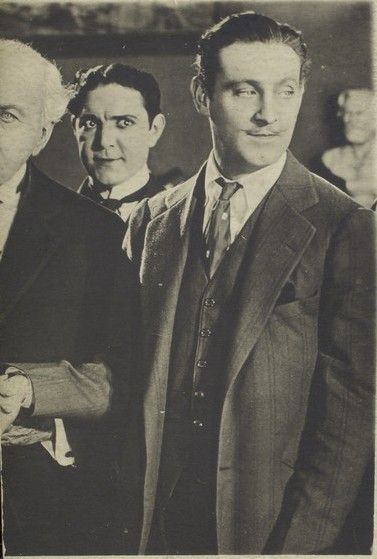
J. Barrymore in the film

Here Comes the Bride is a lost 1919 American silent comedy film produced by Famous Players–Lasky and released by Paramount Pictures. This film is based on the 1917 Broadway play Here Comes the Bride by Max Marcin and Roy Atwell. The film was directed by John S. Robertson and stars John Barrymore.

== Plot ==
As described in a film magazine, poor young man Frederick Tile is in love with the daughter of a rich man, and in order to obtain money agrees to marry a veiled woman from whom he will be divorced in one year and allow some schemers to use his name to obtain a vast property.

After the ceremony, the just married groom by a set of logical circumstances comes to spend the night in the mansion of some friends who have just left town. The young woman he loves, Ethel Sinclair that same night has left home, leaving a note that says she plans to elope with the man she loves, and by another set of logical circumstances sleeps in an adjacent room at the mansion. The next morning they meet at breakfast while still in their bedclothes, resulting in a comical situation.

== Cast ==
- John Barrymore – Frederick Tile
- Frank Losee – Robert Sinclair
- Faire Binney – Ethel Sinclair
- Frances Kay – Nora Sinclair
- Alfred Hickman – James Carleton
- William David – Thurlow Benson
- Leslie King – Ashley
- Harry Semels – Sevier

== See also ==
John Barrymore filmography
