= Figures de cire =

1914 French short silent horror film

Figures de Cire
- Directed by: Maurice Tourneur
- Written by: André de Lorde
- Based on: Figures de cire by André de Lorde
- Starring: Henry Roussel, Emile Tramont, Henri Gouget
- Distributed by: Cinema Éclair
- Release date: 1914
- Running time: 11 minutes
- Country: France
- Language: Silent (French intertitles)

Figures de Cire (also known in English as The Man with Wax Faces, and re-released in 1918 as L'Homme aux figures de cire) is a 1914 French short silent horror film directed by Maurice Tourneur. The film stars Henry Roussel, and was based upon the short story of the same name by André de Lorde. De Lorde adapted the story from the stage play he wrote with Georges Montignac, which was first performed in 1912 at the Grand Guignol in Paris.

The film was believed to be lost until a damaged copy was discovered in 2007, and it was subsequently re-released by French film restoration, publishing and production company Lobster Films. Though the tradition of "Chambers of Horror" in wax museums dates back to the late 18th century, the film has been noted as among the first pieces of horror fiction to involve a wax museum, prefiguring 1924's Waxworks, 1933's Mystery of the Wax Museum, and 1953's House of Wax among others.

== Plot ==
Following a discussion of the nature of fear at a raucous cabaret, a man named Pierre claims that the emotion is unknown to him ("sensation m'est inconnue"), and accepts a bet to stay at a sinister location all night. His friend Jacques, who proposed the bet, chooses a wax museum as the "sinister location."

Pierre pays the employee or proprietor of the wax museum (described simply as "l'homme aux figures de cire," literally "the man with wax figures") to allow him to stay in the museum overnight. The man is reluctant, but agrees on the condition that Pierre not damage anything. He shows Pierre in, and leaves him there.

At first, Pierre is bored, but as he wanders the grim tableaux, he gradually becomes more anxious. Eventually, terrified, he tries to get out, but discovers he is locked in. Meanwhile, Jacques, having left the cabaret around two AM, sneaks into the wax museum through a back entrance. Pierre sees his shadow behind a paper screen, and, frantic with terror, wildly stabs him.

The final intertitle reveals that when Pierre is discovered at dawn, he has lost his mind and "his dagger had added another figure to the wax museum" ("son poignard avait ajouté au musée de cire une figure de plus"). The film ends with a wild, knife-wielding Pierre standing over the body of Jacques while police survey the scene.

== Cast ==
- Henry Roussel as Pierre de Lionne
- Emile Tramont as Jacques (credited as "M. Tramont")
- Henri Gouget as "L'Homme aux figures de cire" (credited as "M. Gouget")

== Production ==
Director Maurice Tourneur, scenarist André de Lorde and actor Henry Roussel had worked together previously a year earlier, in the 1913 silent horror film Le système du docteur Goudron et du professeur Plume (The System of Doctor Goudron, released in the US as The Lunatics), which itself was based on Edgar Allan Poe's 1845 short story The System of Doctor Tarr and Professor Fether and, like Figures de cire, was originally staged as a play at the Grand Guignol in Paris in 1903 (where it had starred Henri Gouget).

Though Figures de cire had originally been written as a stageplay by de Lorde (who wrote hundreds of plays for the Grand Guignol), the film credits state that it is based on his short story (in French, "nouvelles"), which he adapted from his play and published in an eponymous collection in 1932 (the story was first published in English as "Waxworks" in the 1933 anthology Terrors: A Collection of Uneasy Tales, anonymously edited by Charles Birkin).

== See also ==
- List of rediscovered films
- Silent films
- 1914 in film
- Wax museum

== Notes ==
1.Or 1910, sources vary; Adriaensens gives the date for the original play as 1912, Waldman as 1910.
