= The Cub =

1915 film directed by Maurice Tourneur

- Directed by: Maurice Tourneur
- Written by: Maurice Tourneur (scenario)
- Based on: The Cub by Thompson Buchanan
- Produced by: William A. Brady
- Starring: Martha Hedman
- Edited by: Clarence Brown
- Distributed by: World Film Company
- Release date: July 19, 1915
- Running time: 5 reels
- Country: United States
- Language: Silent film (English intertitles)

The Cub is an extant 1915 silent film drama produced by William A. Brady and directed by Maurice Tourneur. The film is based on a 1910 Broadway play, The Cub by Thompson Buchanan, also produced by Brady. This marks the only time stage actress Martha Hedman starred in a film. This film has been recently restored and available for viewing and DVD purchase.

== Cast ==
- Johnny Hines - Steve Oldham
- Martha Hedman - Alice Renlow
- Robert Cummings - Capt. White
- Dorothy Farnum - Peggy White
- Jessie Lewis - Becky King
- Bert Starkey - Stark White
