= Deliverance (1919 film) =

1919 silent film

- Directed by: George Foster Platt
- Written by: Francis Trevelyan Miller
- Produced by: Helen Keller Film Corporation
- Starring: Etna Ross; Ann Mason; Tula Belle; Edith Lyle; Betty Schade; Jenny Lind
- Cinematography: Lawrence Fowler; Arthur L. Todd
- Music by: Anselm Goetzl
- Distributed by: George Kleine System
- Release date: 1919
- Running time: 90 minutes
- Country: United States
- Language: Silent

Deliverance is a 1919 silent film which tells the story of the life of Helen Keller and her teacher, Annie Sullivan. It stars Etna Ross, Tula Belle, Edith Lyle, Betty Schade, Sarah Lind, Ann Mason and Jenny Lind. The film also features appearances by Helen Keller, Anne Sullivan, Kate Adams Keller and Phillips Brooks Keller as themselves. The movie was directed by George Foster Platt and written by Francis Trevelyan Miller.

== Cast (in credits order) ==
- Etna Ross ... Young Helen Keller
- Tula Belle ... Young Nadja
- Edith Lyle ... Younger Anne Sullivan (as Edythe Lyle)
- Betty Schade ... Mrs. Kate Adams Keller as a young woman
- Jenny Lind ... Martha Washington
- Sarah Lind ... Mammy
- Ann Mason ... Helen Keller as a young woman
- Helen Keller ... Herself
- Anne Sullivan ... Herself
- Kate Adams Keller ... Herself
- Phillips Brooks Keller ... Himself
- Polly Thompson ... Helen's secretary
- Ardita Mellinina ... Nadja
- J. Parks Jones ... Nadja's son
- True Boardman ... Helen's boy friend (uncredited)
- Herbert Heyes ... Ulysses (uncredited)

== Preservation status ==
A copy of the film is in the Library of Congress film archive.
