= List of Italian films of 1914 =

A list of films produced in Italy in 1914 (see 1914 in film):

Title	Director	Cast	Genre	Notes
1914
To Forgive, Divine				
L' Abete fulminato				
Gli Abitatori delle fogne				
L' Accordo in minore				
Cabiria	Giovanni Pastrone	Lidia Quaranta, Gina Marangoni, Dante Testa, Umberto Mozzato, Bartolomeo Pagano, Raffaele Di Napoli	Sword and sandal	Silent classic. D. W. Griffith was inspired by Cabiria. Taviani brothers made a tribute in Good Morning, Babylon
Doctor Antonio	Eleuterio Rodolfi	Hamilton Revelle, Fernanda Negri Pouget	Historical	
La donna nuda	Carmine Gallone			
La fuga dei diamanti	Augusto Genina			
