= The System of Doctor Goudron =

1913 French short silent horror film

- Directed by: Maurice Tourneur
- Written by: André de Lorde; Edgar Allan Poe
- Starring: Henri Gouget; Henry Roussel; Renée Sylvaire
- Production company: Société Française des Films Éclair
- Release date: 26 December 1913
- Country: France
- Languages: Silent; French intertitles

The System of Doctor Goudron (French: Le système du docteur Goudron et du professeur Plume, also released in the United States as The Lunatics) is a 1913 French short silent horror film directed by Maurice Tourneur and starring Henri Gouget, Henry Roussel and Renée Sylvaire. It was adapted from a 1903 Grand Guignol play (also starring Gouget) by André de Lorde, which was itself based on the 1845 short story The System of Doctor Tarr and Professor Fether by Edgar Allan Poe. It has been called the first French feature-length horror film.

The film was the first of two Grand Guignol adaptations directed by Tourneur, written by de Lorde, and starring Gouget and Roussel; the second would be 1914's Figures de cire.

It is currently considered lost with no extant copies known to exist.

== Plot ==
The plot revolves around a journalist, who, accompanied by his wife, travels to an old castle (complete with moat) which has been turned into an asylum, in the hopes of writing about a new approach to curing patients which is said to be practiced there. Arriving during a storm, they quickly discover that the inmates have taken over, and that the "cure" to insanity is gouging out an eye and slitting the throat. One "doctor" seems to be practicing this technique; another believes that he can float. Escape seems impossible, and the reporter is drawn to a table to undergo the "cure", but a gust of wind scattering the "doctor's" papers provides a distraction, and, with the help of a sympathetic inmate, the two protagonists are able to flee to safety.

== Cast ==
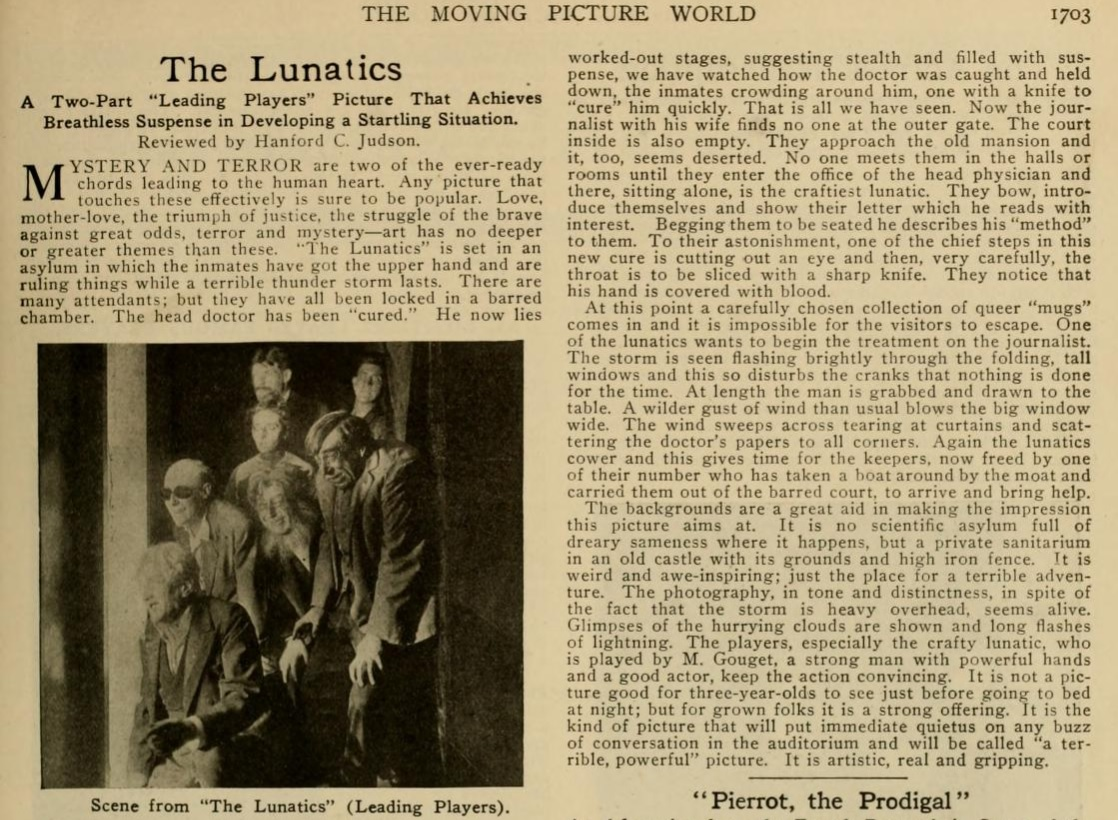
Contemporary trade review (using the US title The Lunatics)

- Henri Gouget as Goudron
- Henry Roussel as Tourist
- Renée Sylvaire as Tourist's wife
- Bahier as Plume
- Robert Saidreau

== Critical reception ==
Hanford Judson, writing for industry trade magazine The Moving Picture World in 1914, called the film “the kind of picture that will put immediate quietus on any buzz of conversation in the auditorium and will be called a ‘terrible, powerful’ picture. It is artistic, real, and gripping,” and praised the cinematography, along with Gouget's performance. Tourneur biographer Harry Waldman described the film as "...one of the first truly original French films - the earliest of the Grand-Guignol genre and the most celebrated if not most shocking of its day."

== Bibliography ==
- Waldman, Harry. Maurice Tourneur: The Life and Films. McFarland, 2001.
