= Sporting Life (1918 film) =

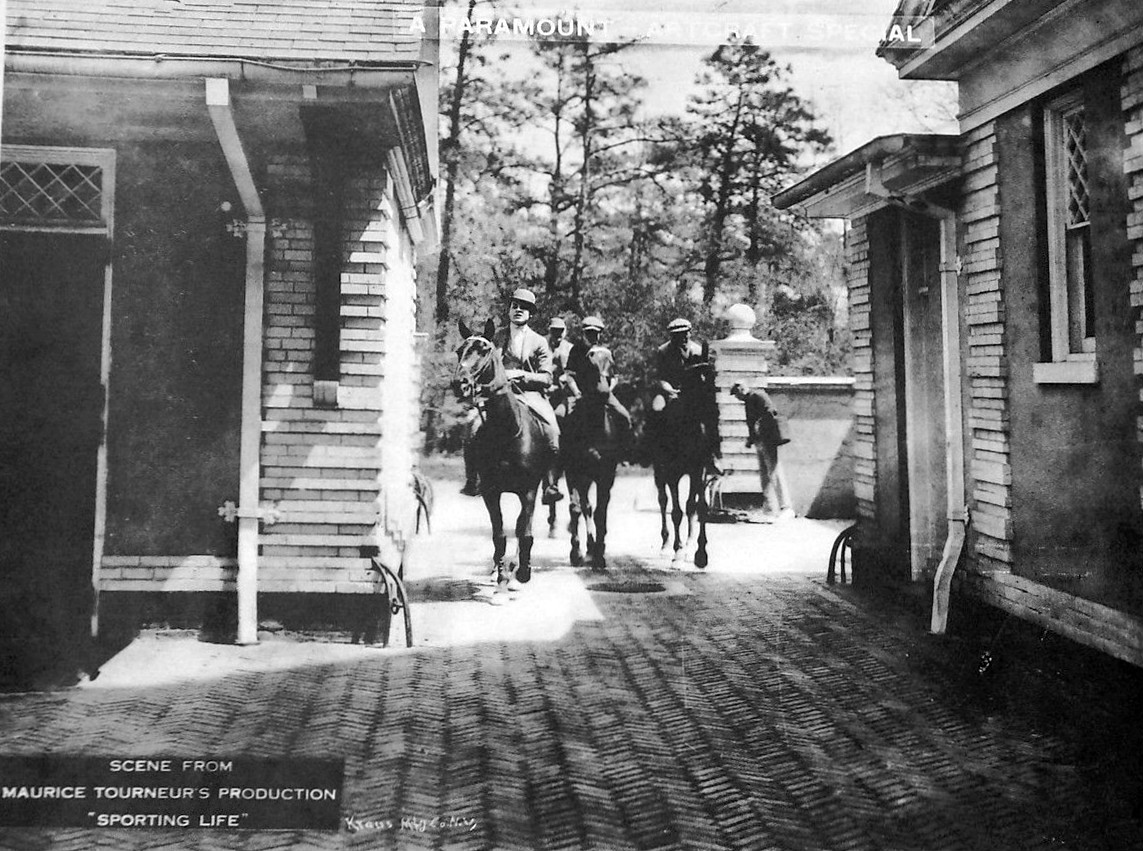
- Lobby card
- Directed by: Maurice Tourneur
- Written by: Winthrop Kelley (scenario)
- Based on: Sporting Life (play) by Seymour Hicks and Cecil Raleigh
- Produced by: Maurice Tourneur
- Starring: Constance Binney; Faire Binney
- Cinematography: John van den Broek
- Production company: Maurice Tourneur Productions
- Distributed by: State's Rights: Hiller & Wilk
- Release date: September 15, 1918 (New York City)
- Running time: 7 reels (6,032 feet)
- Country: United States
- Language: Silent (English intertitles)

Sporting Life is a lost 1918 American silent drama film directed by Maurice Tourneur. It is the first film for sisters Faire Binney and Constance Binney, from the Broadway stage. Tourneur would re-film this story again in 1925.

== Plot ==
As described in a film magazine, Lord Woodstock is in financial difficulties and is counting on a fight and a race to reestablish his fortune. He has plighted his troth to Norah, daughter of his trainer Miles Cavanagh. His sister Kitty is in love with Joe Lee, a Gypsy. Malet de Carteret and his wife Olive are anxious to ruin Woodstock for their own gain. Olive attempts to fascinate Joe so that he will throw the fight as, under the rules of the Club, unless Woodstock can pay his debts after the fight he cannot race. Unable to arrange it any other way, Olive has Joe poisoned. Woodstock then goes into the ring himself and wins the fight. His horse Lady Love has been stolen, but Norah cleverly finds her and gets the horse to the track on time. Then Woodstock is seized, bound, and held on a ferry boat. In case of his death, the horse cannot run, and De Carteret claims that Woodstock is dead. Joe learns of the treachery of the de Carterets and risks his life to save Woodstock. Kitty, who had suffered under the hands of Olive, recovers sufficiently to see the race being won. When the police are taking Joe away because his attack against Olive that was necessary to free Kitty, she is told that the charge will never be pressed. In a charming fadeout two sisters become brides of Woodstock and Joe for a happy ending.

== Cast ==
- Ralph Graves as John, Earl of Woodstock
- Warner Richmond as Joe Lee
- Charles Eldridge as Miles Cavanagh
- Charles Craig as Malet de Carteret
- Henry West as Straker
- Constance Binney as Norah Cavanagh
- Faire Binney as Kitty Cavanagh
- Willette Kershaw as Olive de Carteret
- Harry Harris as Crake
- Eddie Kelly as Woodstock
- Clara Beyers (Undetermined Role)

== Reception ==
Variety's review was positive, and said that the film would "give satisfaction to any audience."

== Censorship ==
Like many American films of the time, Sporting Life was subject to restrictions and cuts by city and state film censorship boards. For example, the Chicago Board of Censors required a cut, in Reel 2, of the two intertitles "Please tell father you want to marry me — if he ever learns the truth" etc. and "The night before Epsom Downs, Kitty endeavors to tell her father her pitiful secret", and, Reel 3, the intertitle "If you had left him alone he would have married me".
