= Sporting Life (1925 film) =

1925 film directed by Maurice Tourneur

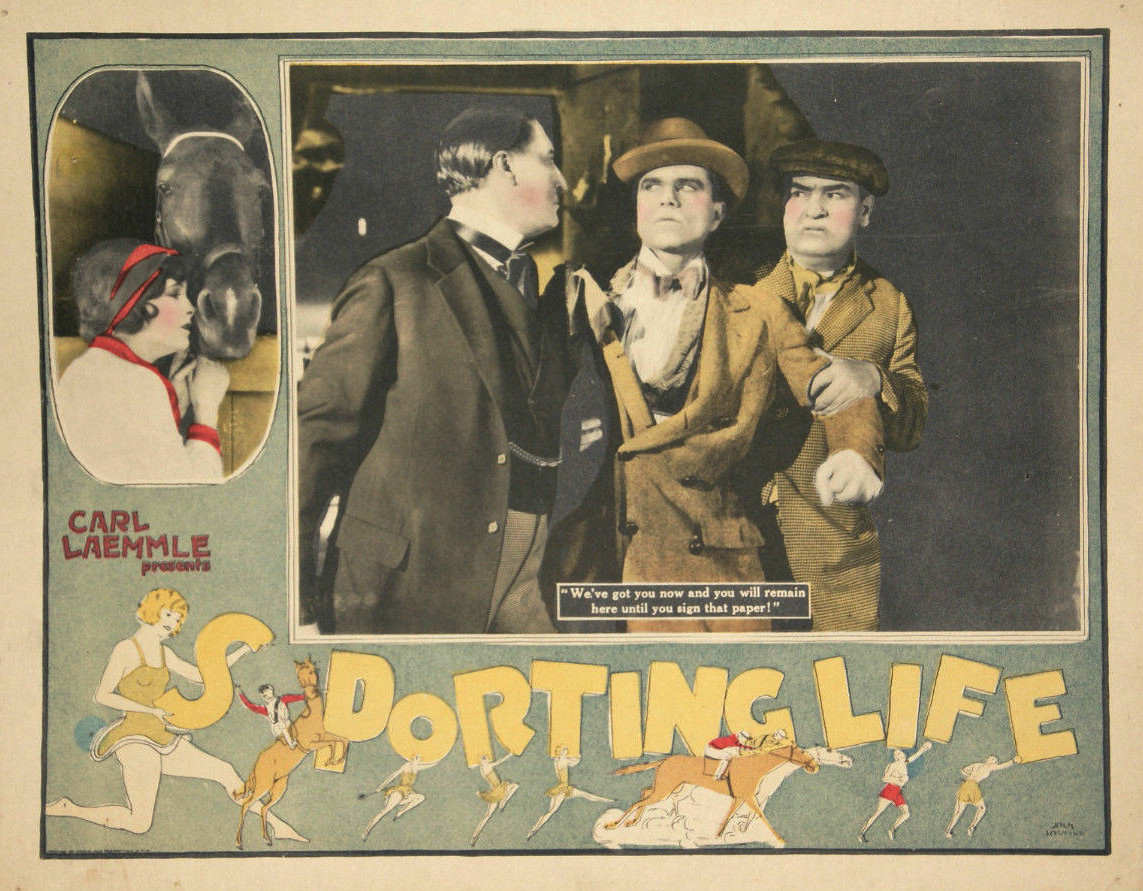
- Lobby card
- Directed by: Maurice Tourneur
- Written by: Cecil Raleigh
- Based on: Sporting Life by Seymour Hicks and Cecil Raleigh
- Produced by: Carl Laemmle
- Starring: Bert Lytell
- Cinematography: Arthur L. Todd
- Distributed by: Universal Pictures
- Release date: November 25, 1925
- Running time: 7 reels (6,709 feet) (c.70 min.)
- Country: United States
- Language: Silent (English intertitles)

Sporting Life is a 1925 American silent comedy drama film directed by Maurice Tourneur and a remake of Tourneur's 1918 film of the same title based on Seymour Hicks's popular play. Universal Pictures produced and released the film.

== Plot ==
As described in a film magazine review, Lord Woodstock loses money as the backer of a musical show and hopes to recoup his losses by betting on his protégé, Joe Lee, a pugilist, and by winning the Derby with his horse, Lady Love. Olive Carteret, an actress, tries to win Woodstock, but he is in love with Nora, the daughter of his trainer. Olive conspires with Phillips, a gambler, to break him. On the night of the fight Lee is drugged. Woodstock takes his place in the ring and wins. Phillips kidnaps Nora, and Woodstock and Lee are imprisoned when they go to the rescue. They escape shortly before the race, but Lee is killed. Lady Love wins the race, and after Phillips is arrested for Lee's murder, Woodstock and Nora are free to marry.

== Cast ==
- Bert Lytell as Lord Woodstock
- Marian Nixon as Nora Cavanaugh
- Paulette Duval as Olive Carteret
- Cyril Chadwick as Phillips, Lord Wainwright
- Charles Delaney as Joe Lee
- George Siegmann as Limhouse Dan Crippen
- Oliver Eckhardt as Jim Cavanaugh
- Ena Gregory as Peggy, a Chorus Girl
- Kathleen Clifford as Molly McGuire, A Chorus Girl
- Frank Finch Smiles as Boxer
- Ted "Kid" Lewis as Gunner Crake, Boxer
- Arthur Lake as Peggy's Admirer in Audience (uncredited)
- Myrna Loy as Chorus Girl with Lord Wainwright (uncredited)
- Lafe McKee as Stage Doorman (uncredited)
- Broderick O'Farrell as Race Track Official (uncredited)

== Preservation ==
Once thought lost, a print of Sporting Life survives at UCLA Film & Television Archive.
