= Gus Weinberg =

Actor and composer

Gus C. Weinberg (c. 1865 – August 11, 1952) was an actor, writer, and composer who appeared in early-twentieth-century American films. He also had theatrical roles during his career. Weinberg lived in Milwaukee but traveled widely, appearing in several lead roles in touring shows in the United States and London. Some of the songs he wrote became popular.

== Life and career ==
He was born in Milwaukee, Wisconsin. As early as 1891, he was described as "familiar to Milwaukee audiences", and it was reported that "his original topical songs are being whistled all over Milwaukee", where he sometimes performed with his sister Joey Weinberg. At least two musicians were recorded performing the song "Girl Wanted" he composed.

In 1934 it was reported that "[F. P.] Choate arranged to take over the historic old Mason theater, where he had acted in musical plays with Gus Weinberg and other stars of the day". Weinberg was still alive as of 1936, when it was reported that "Gus Weinberg, play writer and actor, has returned to New York after a summer vacation spent with his sister on the back shore drive". Shortly after his death, a 1952 retrospective in Omaha, Nebraska, noted:

You will also remember Gus Weinberg who died at 86 in Portland, Me. He played Omaha many times, first in the Pixley and Luders musical comedy "The Burgomaster," then in "The Isle of Spice," "The Forbidden Land," "The Song Birds," "The Gingerbread Man" and others.

== Theater ==
- The Ballet Girl (1898)
- The Storks (1904)
- The Burgomaster (1911)
- A Tailor-Made Man (1917)

== Filmography ==
- To-Day (1917) as Henry Morton
- Frontier of the Stars (1921) as Ganz
- The Ne'er-Do-Well (1923) as Andres Garavel
- Homeward Bound (1923) as Captain Svenson
- Soul-Fire (1925)

== Musical compositions ==
- "Girl Wanted"
- "That Tired Feeling"
- "Moments When One Wants to Be Alone"
- "That Was the Last That I Remembered, A Melodious Comic Song"
- "Now He's Sorry That He Spoke"
