= A Doll's House (1918 film) =

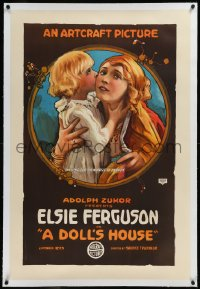
- lobby poster
- Directed by: Maurice Tourneur
- Written by: Charles Maigne (adaptation); Maurice Tourneur (scenario)
- Based on: A Doll's House by Henrik Ibsen
- Produced by: Adolph Zukor; Jesse Lasky
- Starring: Elsie Ferguson
- Cinematography: John van den Broek
- Distributed by: Artcraft Pictures
- Release date: June 2, 1918
- Running time: 5 reels (4,576 feet)
- Country: United States
- Language: Silent (English intertitles)

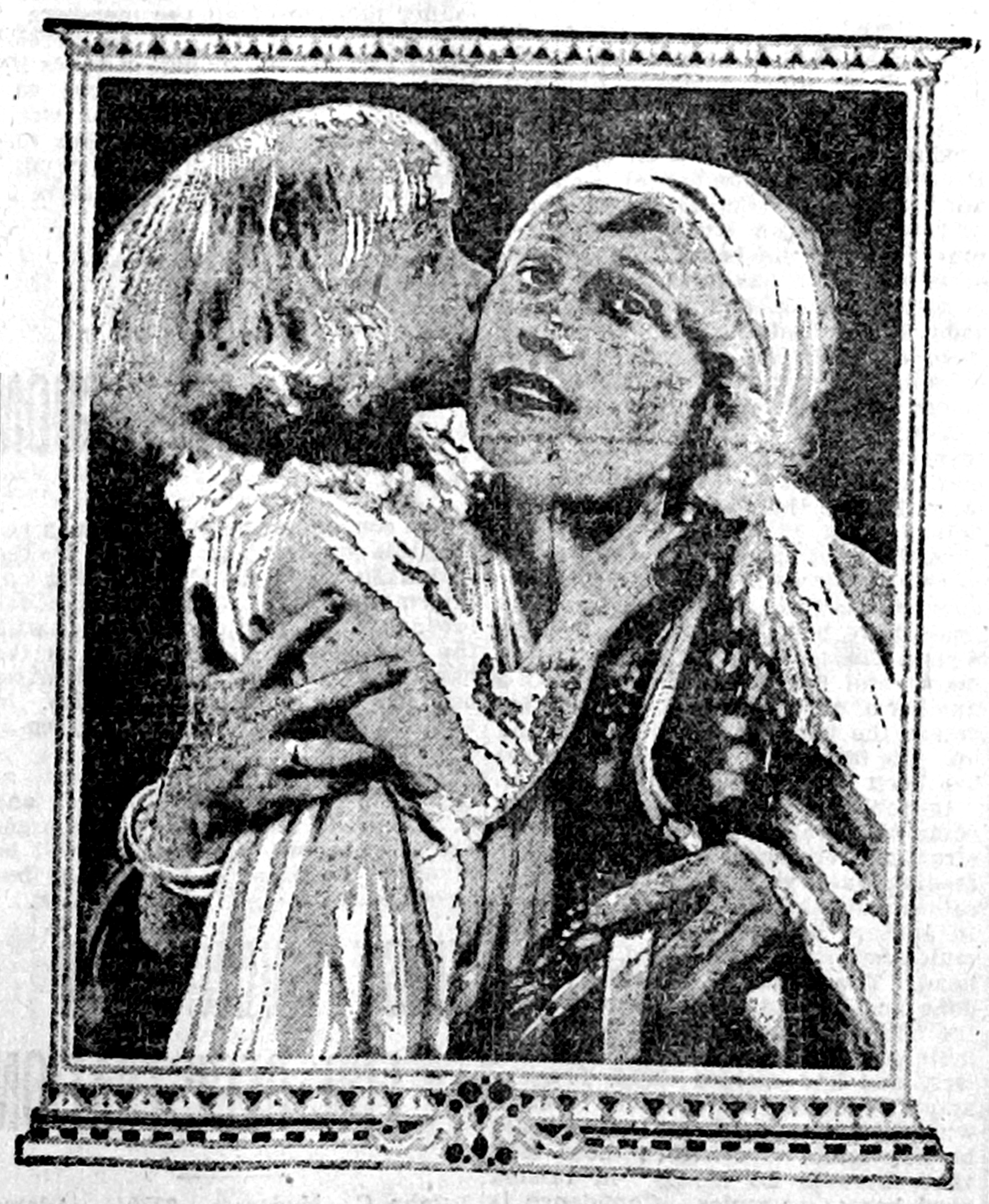
Scene in the film.

A Doll's House is a 1918 American silent drama film produced by Famous Players–Lasky and distributed by Artcraft Pictures, an affiliate of Paramount Pictures. It is the third American motion picture filming of Henrik Ibsen's 1879 play A Doll's House. Maurice Tourneur directed and Elsie Ferguson starred. This film is lost.

== Plot ==
As described in a film magazine, to save her husband's life, Nora Helmer borrows a large sum of money and, after he has recovered, saying nothing to him, she slowly pays the debt. When Helmar discharges Krogstadt, the moneylender, from the bank, Krogstadt threatens to expose Nora's act. Believing that her husband will condone what she has done, Nora confesses. Instead, he blames her. This unexpected action changes the doll-wife into a woman of the world, and as such she leaves her husband and three children to go out into the world and apply her knowledge of the serious side of life for her further education.

== Cast ==
- Elsie Ferguson as Nora Helmer
- Holmes Herbert as Thorvald Helmar
- Alex Shannon as Krogstadt
- Ethel Grey Terry as Mrs. Linden
- Warren Cook as Dr. Rank
- Zelda Crosby as Ellen, the Maid
- Mrs. R.S. Anderson as Anna, the Nurse
- Ivy Ward as Helmar Child
- Tula Belle as Helmar Child
- Douglas Redmond as Krogstadt Child
- Charles Crompton as Krogstadt Child
