= Tula Belle =

Child actor (1906–1992)

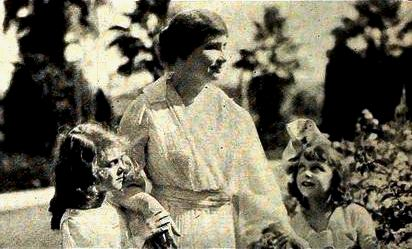
- Child actresses Etna Ross and Tula Belle in Deliverance (1919) about Helen Keller
- Born: Borgny Erna Bull Høegh; July 28, 1906; Kristiania (now Oslo), Norway
- Died: October 13, 1992 (aged 86); Newport Beach, California, USA
- Years active: 1915-1920

Tula Belle (born Borgny Erna Bull Høegh; 28 July 1906 – 13 October 1992) was an American child film actress. She was born in Kristiania (now Oslo), Norway.

She starred in The Blue Bird.

== Death ==
She died in Newport Beach, California, USA at the age of 86 in 1992.

== Filmography ==
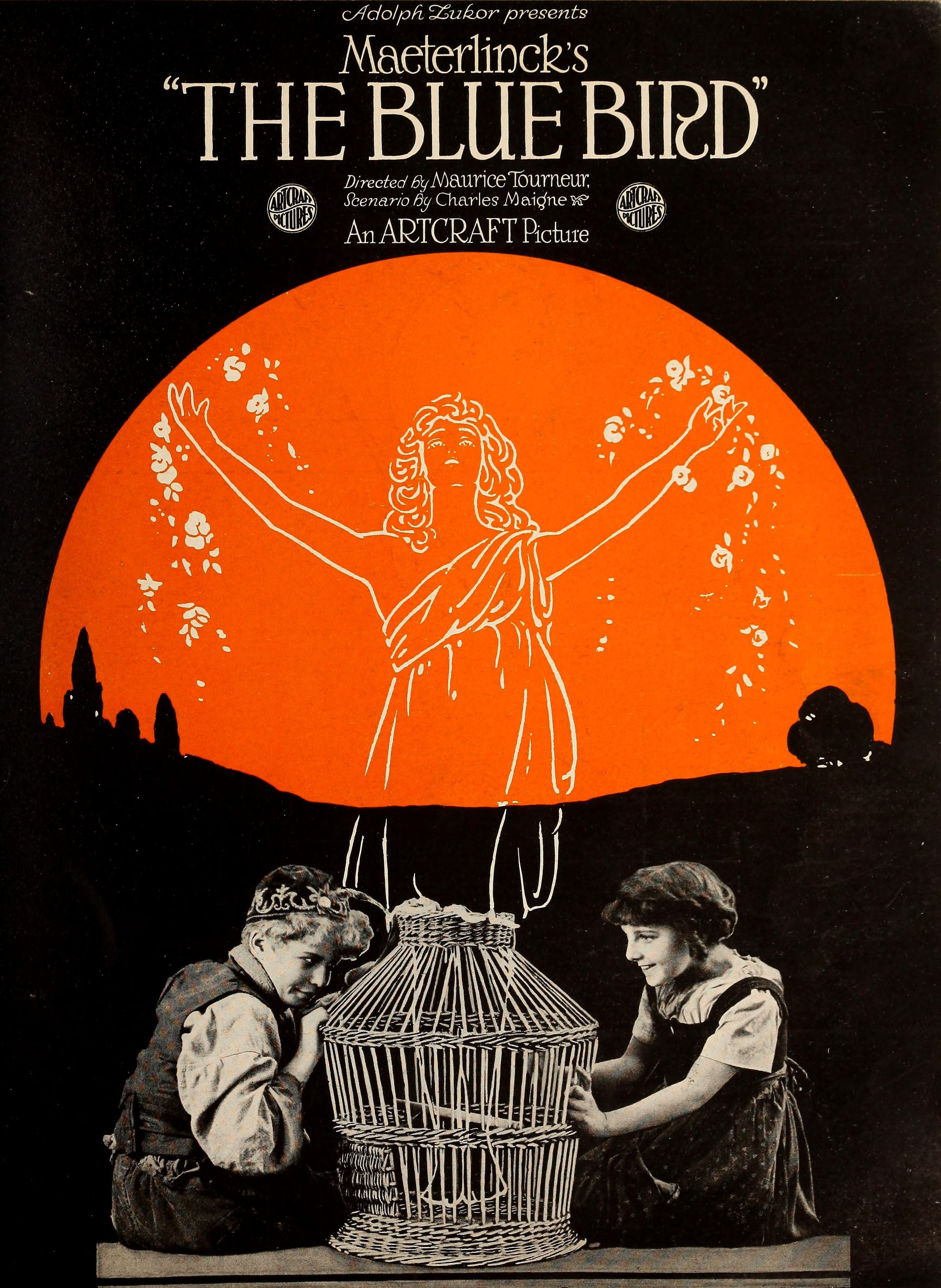
The Blue Bird (1918)

Year	Title	Role	Notes
1916	A Bird of Prey	The Child - Age 5	
1916	The Fear of Poverty	Child	
1916	The Brand of Cowardice	Rana (Idiqui's daughter)	
1917	The Vicar of Wakefield	Dick Primrose	
1917	The Woman and the Beast	The Child	
1917	Over the Hill	Rose's Sister	
1918	The Blue Bird	Mytyl	
1918	At the Mercy of Men	Alice	
1918	A Doll's House	Helmer Child	based on A Doll's House by Henrik Ibsen
1919	Gates of Brass	Margaret Blake as a Child	
1919	Deliverance	Young Nadja (First Episode)	
1919	The Miracle Man		uncredited
1920	Old Dad	Little Girl with Two Mothers	final film role
