= The Rise of Jennie Cushing =

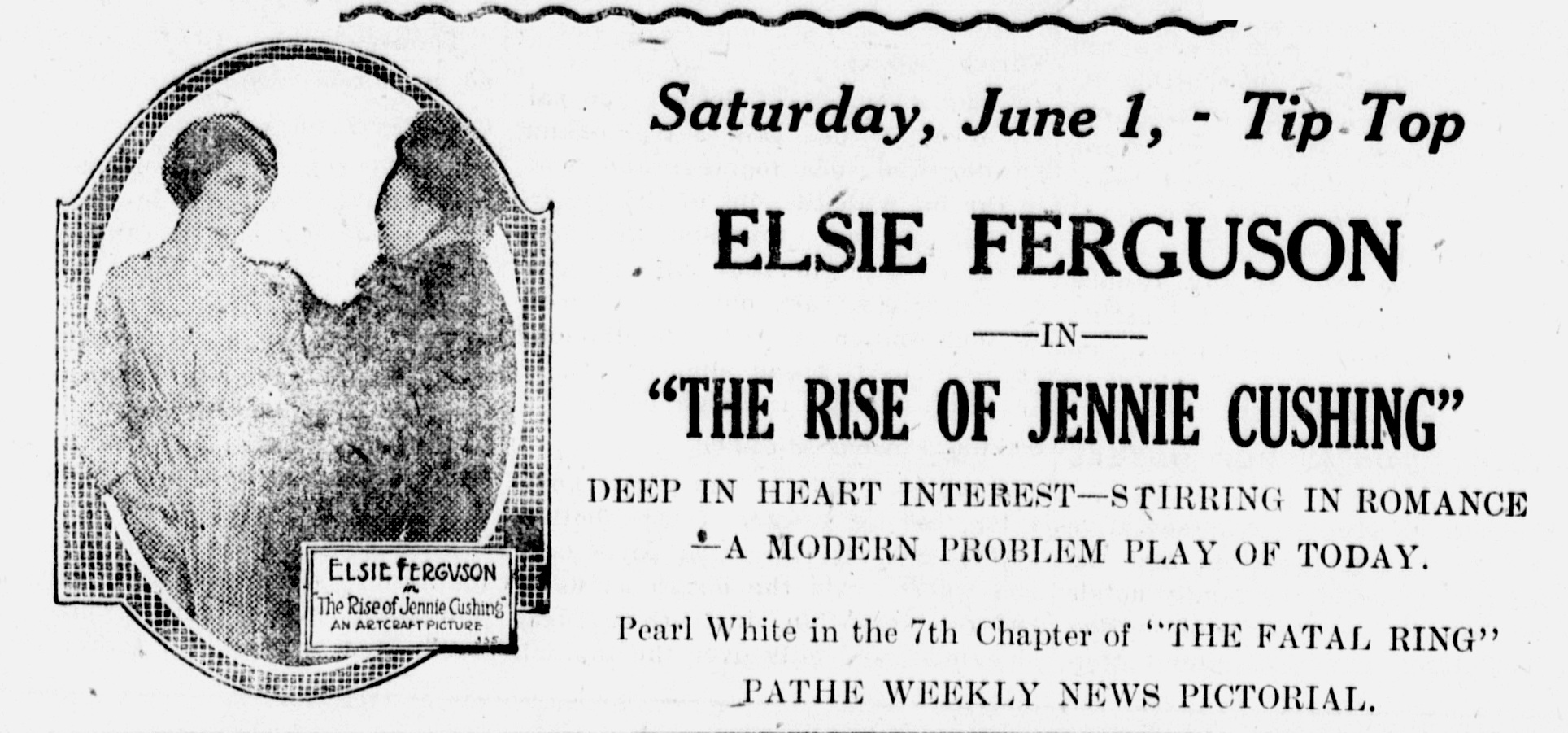
- Newspaper advertisement.
- Directed by: Maurice Tourneur
- Written by: Charles Maigne (scenario)
- Based on: The Rise of Jennie Cushing by Mary Watts
- Produced by: Adolph Zukor
- Starring: Elsie Ferguson
- Cinematography: John van den Broek
- Distributed by: Artcraft Pictures
- Release date: November 11, 1917
- Running time: 5 reels
- Country: United States
- Language: Silent (English intertitles)

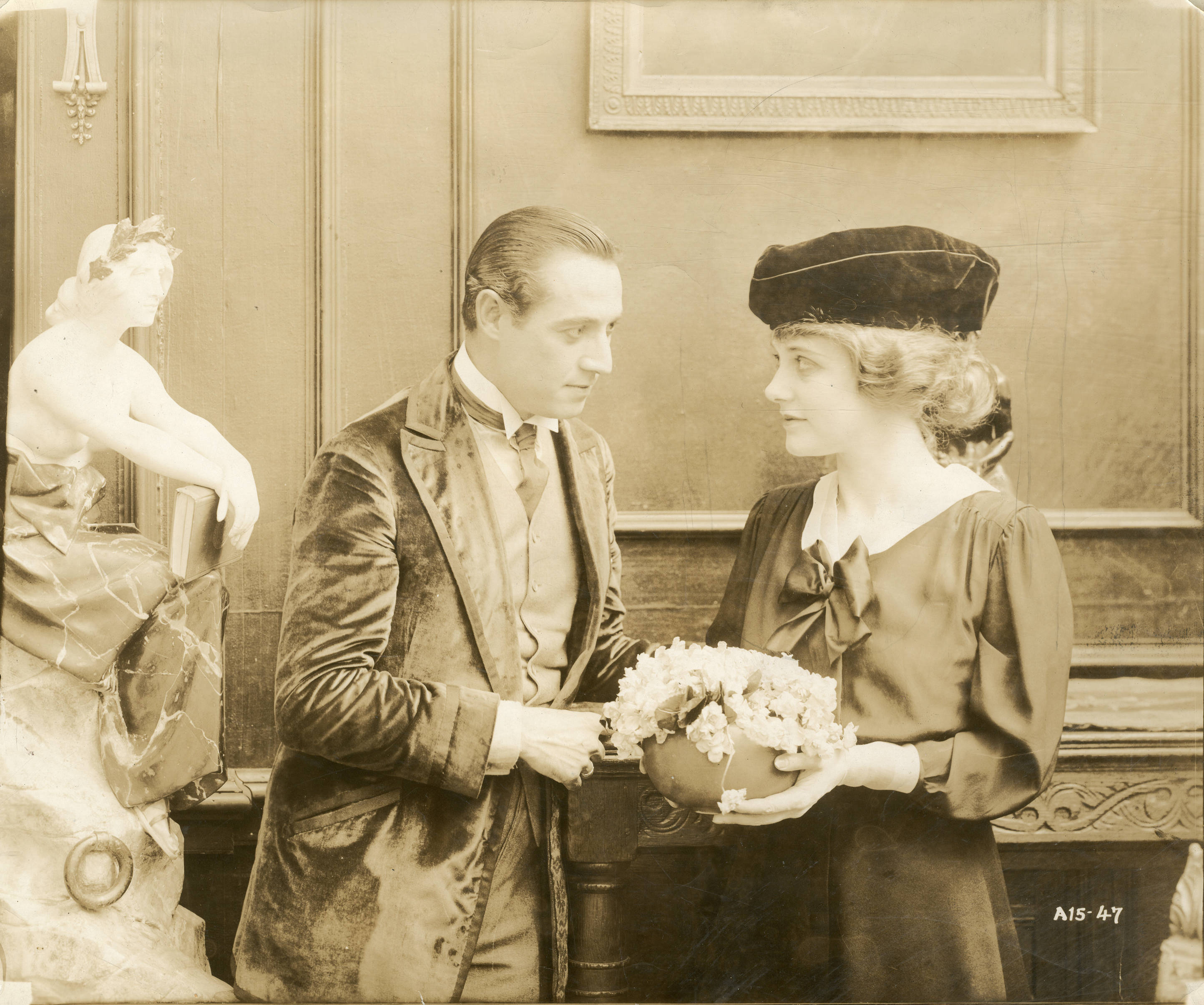
Still with Elliott Dexter and Elsie Ferguson

The Rise of Jennie Cushing is a 1917 American silent drama film directed by Maurice Tourneur, produced by Famous Players–Lasky, and distributed by Artcraft Pictures, an affiliate of Paramount Pictures. The story based upon the novel The Rise of Jennie Cushing by Mary Watts and stars Broadway's Elsie Ferguson. The film marked Ferguson's second motion picture. It is a lost film.

== Plot ==
As described in a film magazine, when the police authorities learn of the type of people Jennie Cushing lives with, they send her to a reformatory. Shortly before the end of her term she becomes the hired girl of the Doane's. From there she goes to the city and becomes the maid to the wealthy Edith Gerrard. When Donelson Meigs, a famous artist, is painting Miss Gerrard's picture, he falls in love with the maid, who accompanies her mistress to each sitting. He persuades Jennie to pose for him and finally tells her of his love. Jennie realizes the difference in their social positions and, although she now lives with him, she will not become his wife. After Jennie discovers that Donelson has learned of her having been in a reformatory, she leaves him and goes to America, where she starts a home for young children of the slums. After a two-year search Donelson finds her and professes his love.

== Cast ==
- Elsie Ferguson - Jennie Cushing
- Elliott Dexter - Donelson Meigs
- Fania Marinoff - Marie
- Frank Goldsmith - Mr. Harrish
- Sallie Delatore - Edith Gerrard
- Mae Bates - Granny
- Edith McAlpin - Mrs. Meigs
- Isabel Vernon - Aunt Carrie
- Marie Burke - (uncredited)
- James Cogan - (uncredited)
- Blanche Craig - (uncredited)

== Reception ==
Like many American films of the time, The Rise of Jennie Cushing was subject to cuts by city and state film censorship boards. The Chicago Board of Censors required cuts of the intertitles "Marie's story was simple, etc.", "It seems wrong and vile - I'll go with you", "Your mother is nearly distracted. Have you really married that Cushing woman?", and "Tell her its Jennie Cushing", the entire incident of the girl's visit to Marie, the intertitles "I won't have a woman like you around my children" and "I want you to be my dear and honored wife", and to change the intertitile "Does Mrs. Jennie Cushing live here?" to "Does Mrs. Jennie Meigs live here?"
