= The Blue Bird (1918 film) =

1918 film by Maurice Tourneur

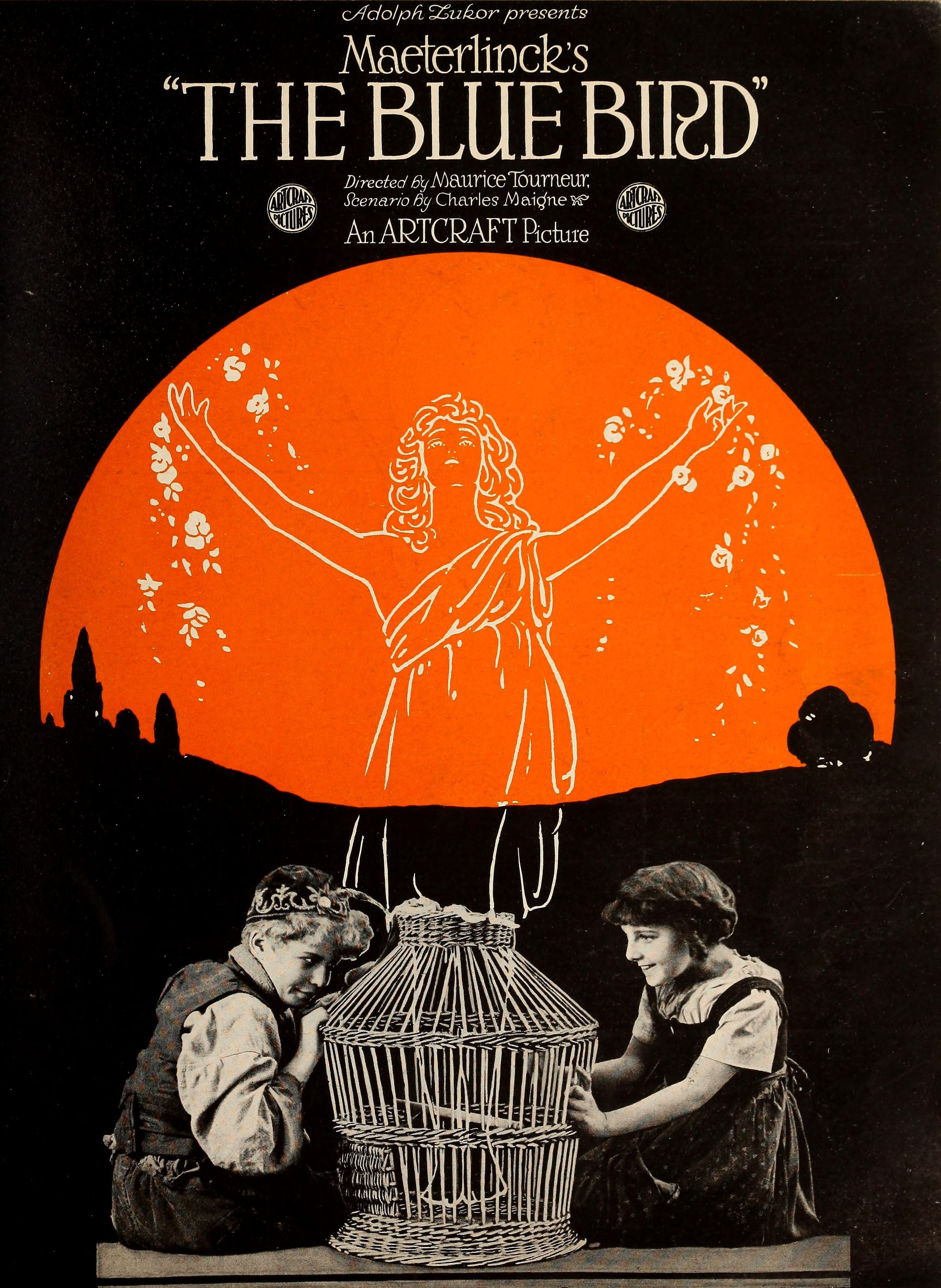
- Directed by: Maurice Tourneur
- Written by: Maurice Maeterlinck; Charles Maigne
- Based on: The Blue Bird; 1908 play by Maurice Maeterlinck
- Starring: Tula Belle; Robin Macdougall
- Cinematography: John van den Broek
- Edited by: Clarence Brown
- Music by: Edward Falck; Hugo Riesenfeld
- Distributed by: Paramount Pictures
- Release date: March 31, 1918
- Running time: 75 minutes
- Country: United States
- Language: Silent (English intertitles)

The Blue Bird

The Blue Bird is a 1918 American silent fantasy film based upon the 1908 play by Maurice Maeterlinck and directed by Maurice Tourneur in the United States, under the auspices of producer Adolph Zukor. In 2004, this film was deemed "culturally, historically, or aesthetically significant" by the United States Library of Congress and selected for preservation in its National Film Registry.

== Plot ==
When poor old widow Berlingot asks Tyltyl and Mytyl, the young son and daughter of her more prosperous neighbors, for the loan of their pet bird to cheer up her ill daughter, Mytyl selfishly refuses. That night, when the children are asleep, the fairy Bérylune enters their home in the semblance of Berlingot, before transforming into her true beautiful appearance. She insists that the children search for the bluebird of happiness. She gives Tyltyl a magical hat which has the power to show him the insides of things. As a result, the souls of fire, water, light, bread, sugar, and milk becoming personified, and their pet dog and cat can now speak with their masters. Before they all set out, Bérylune warns the children that their new companions will all perish once their quest is achieved.

The fairy then takes them to various places to search. At the Palace of Night, the traitorous cat forewarns the Mother of Night, having heard the fairy's prediction. The dog saves Tyltyl from one of the dangers of the palace. In a graveyard, the dead come alive at midnight, and Tyltyl and Mytyl are reunited with their grandmother, grandfather, and siblings. They receive a blue bird, but when they leave, it disappears. Next, they visit the Palace of Happiness. After seeing various lesser joys and happinesses, they are shown the greatest of them all: maternal love in the form of their own mother. Finally, they are transported to the Kingdom of the Future, where children wait to be born, including their brother. Nowhere do they find the bluebird.

Returning home empty-handed, the children see that the bird has been in a cage in their home the whole time. Mytyl gives the bird to Berlingot. She returns shortly afterward with her daughter, now well. However, the bird escapes from the daughter's grasp and flies away. Tyltyl comforts the upset neighbor girl, then turns to the audience and asks the viewers to search for the bluebird where they are most likely to find it: in their own homes.

== Cast ==
- Tula Belle as Mytyl
- Robin Macdougall as Tyltyl
- Edwin E. Reed as Daddy Tyl
- Emma Lowry as Mummy Tyl
- William J. Gross as Grandpa Gaffer Tyl
- Florence Anderson as Granny Tyl
- Edward Elkas as Widow Berlingot
- Katherine Bianchi as Widow Berlingot's Daughter
- Lillian Cook as Fairy Bérylune
- Gertrude McCoy as Light
- Lyn Donelson as Night
- Charles Ascot as Dog
- Tom Corless as Cat
- Mary Kennedy as Water
- Eleanor Masters as Milk
- Charles Craig as Sugar
- Sammy Blum as Bread
- S.E. Potapovitch as Fire
- Rose Rolanda

== Production ==
The film was shot in Fort Lee, New Jersey; many early film studios in America's first motion picture industry were based there at the beginning of the 20th century.

== Reception ==
The New York Times gave the film a highly favorable review, calling it a "hit on screen", and stating that "seldom, if ever, has the atmosphere and spirit of a written work been more faithfully reproduced in motion pictures." Of the actors, the critic wrote, "Tyltyl and Mytyl are as delightful as children, real or imaginary, ever are. Robin Macdougall and Tula Belle make them so", and "all in the play were thoroughly pleasing."
