= Mary Stanbery Watts =

American novelist

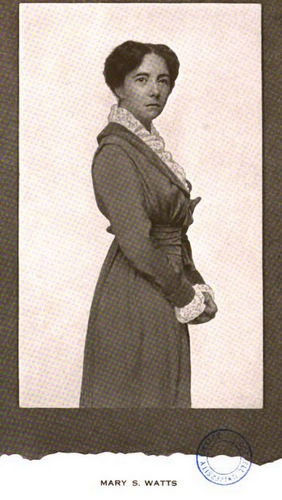
Mary S. Watts, from a 1915 publication.

Mary Stanbery Watts (Mrs. Miles Taylor Watts) (1868–1958) was an American novelist.

== Early life ==
She was born Mary Mott Stanbery on November 4, 1868, on a farm near the Village of Rathbone, by the Scioto river in Liberty Township, Delaware County, Ohio, the younger of two daughters of John Rathbone and Anne (Martin) Stanbery. Her great uncle was Henry Stanbery (1803-1881), Ohio's first attorney-general (1846-1851), and also U.S. attorney-general (1866-1868). Her great grandfather, Dr. Jonas Stanbery (1761-1840), was a founder of Worthington, Franklin County, Ohio. Mary was educated at the Convent of the Sacred in Cincinnati.

On November 11, 1891, Mary was united in marriage with Miles Taylor Watts in the village of Stratford, Ohio. Miles was a first cousin of the William Watts Taylor, known as "The Master of Rookwood," the artist who developed the ceramics that made the Rookwood Pottery Company famous. Mary and Miles had no children of their own, but she became very close to her niece, Anne (Mendenhall) Denison (Mrs. Lonnis Denison), the only child of her sister Adeline (Stanbery) Mendenhall (Mrs. Edward Mendenhall) of Delaware, Ohio.

She died on May 21, 1958, in Cincinnati.

== Literary works ==
Mary Watts's first published pieces were three short stories for McClure's Magazine: "The Gate of the Seven Hundred Virgins" (May 1907), "The Great North Road" (August 1907) and "The Voodoo-Woman" (December 1907). Mrs. Watt's first book The Tenants: An Episode of the Eighties was then published by McClure Publishing Company in March 1908. She published another short story for McClure's Magazine in February 1909: "Camilla's Marriage."

In April 1910, Mary Stanbery Watts's most acclaimed novel, Nathan Burke, an historical novel of the Mexican War, was published by Macmillan Company, which would publish a dozen more novels by Mary Watts. Her second novel was The Legacy: The Story of a Woman in May 1911, followed by Van Cleve in September 1913, set in the time of the Spanish-American War. Then came The Rise of Jennie Cushing in October 1914. This book was made into a silent film by the famous French silent-film director Maurice Tourneur. This may have been one of the first novels for which movie rights were sold.

From 1916 to 1924, Mary S. Watts would publish a novel every year except 1921: The Rudder: A Novel With Several Heroes (March 1916); Three Short Plays. (January 1917); The Boardman Family (April 1918); From Father to Son (June 1919); The Noon-Mark (October 1920); The House of Rimmon (February 1922); Luther Nichols (January 1923) and The Fabric of the Loom (October 1924).

Her last four published pieces, written for Harper's Magazine, were short stories: "The Toiling Masses" (December 1922); "Points of View" (September 1923); "Nice Neighbors" (December 1923) and "White Men" (February 1926).
