= Marguerite Leslie =

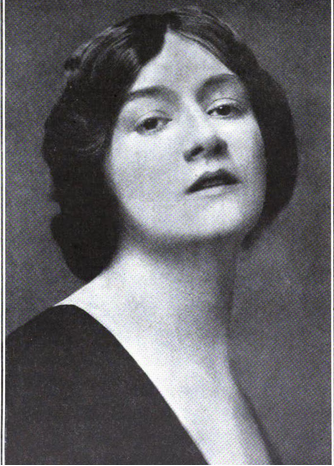
- Marguerite Leslie, from a 1916 publication
- Born: Marguerite Hedman; April 13, 1884; Östersund, Jämtland County, Sweden
- Died: 1958 (aged 73–74)
- Occupation: Actress
- Relatives: Martha Hedman (sister)

Marguerite Leslie (born Marguerite Hedman, April 3, 1884 – 1958) was a Swedish-born English actress.

== Early life ==
Marguerite Hedman was born in Östersund, Jämtland County, Sweden, the daughter of Johan Hedman and Ingrid Kempe. Her sister Martha Hedman also worked as an actress, and later as a writer. The sisters were educated in Sweden, Finland, and London.

== Career ==
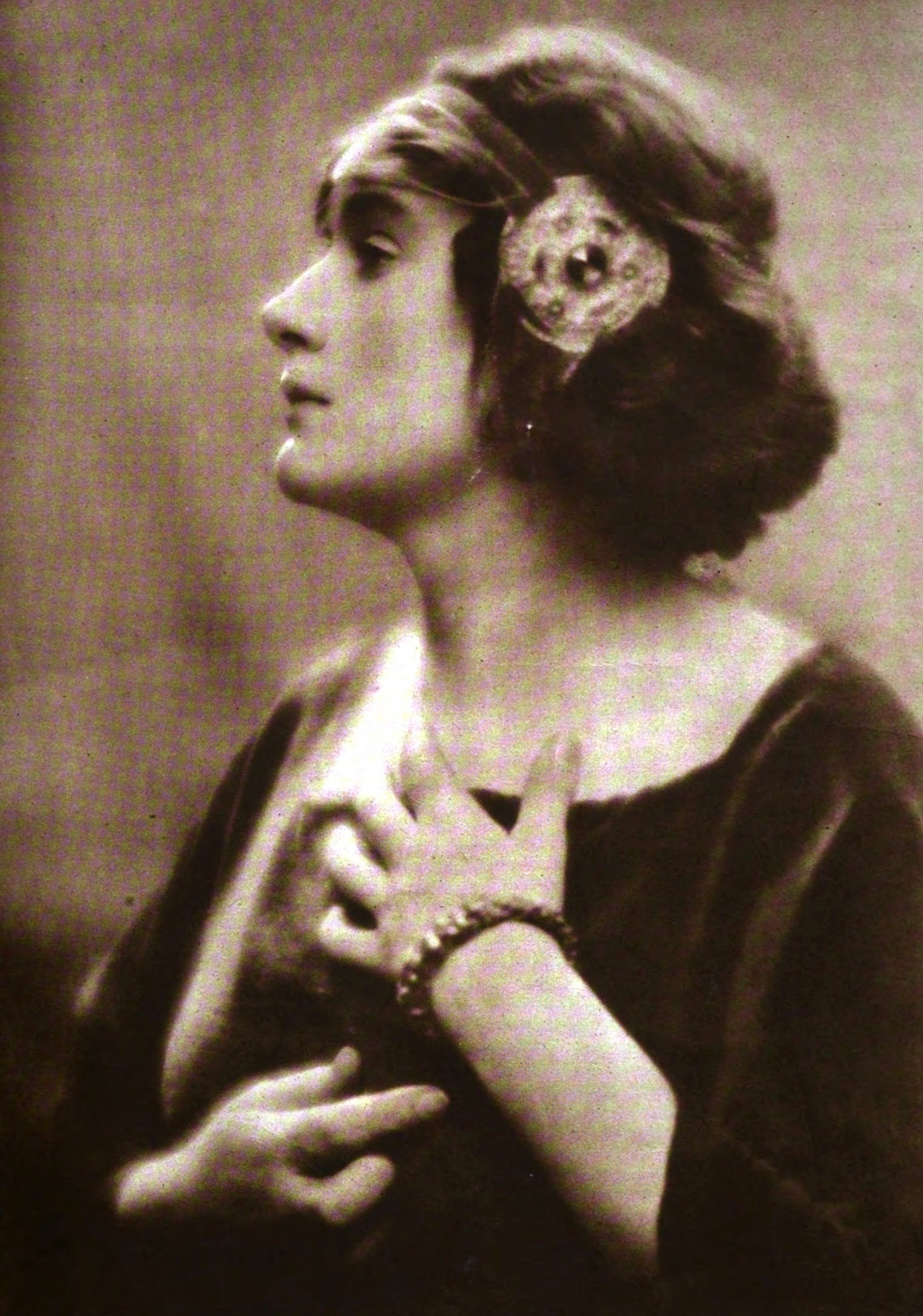
Portrait of Marguerite Leslie, photographed by Arnold Genthe

Marguerite Hedman adopted the name "Marguerite Leslie" as an actress in London, where she appeared in Nero (1906), The Beauty of Bath (1906–1907), My Darling (1907), Concerning a Countess (1907), A Scotch Marriage (1907–1908), Penelope (1909), Preserving Mr. Panmure (1911), The Marionettes (1911–1912), At the Barn (1912), and The Vision of Delight (1912).

Her Broadway credits included The Virginian (1904), Penelope (1909–1910), The Secret (1913–1914), Outcast (1914–1915), and The Basker (1916). In Los Angeles she had roles in The Gamblers (1912) and The Money Moon (1912). She also appeared in four silent films, Jim the Penman (1915, now lost), The Question (1916), The Mite of Love (1919, a short), and The Chosen Path (1919).

She was tall, and considered a beauty as a young actress, a "Burne-Jones girl in an English garden-party hat... quite the pinkest and whitest, fresh daisiest thing we have had for a long while," mused one Los Angeles writer. During World War I she worked raising funds for the Red Cross.
