= Faire Binney =

American silent film actress (1900–1957)

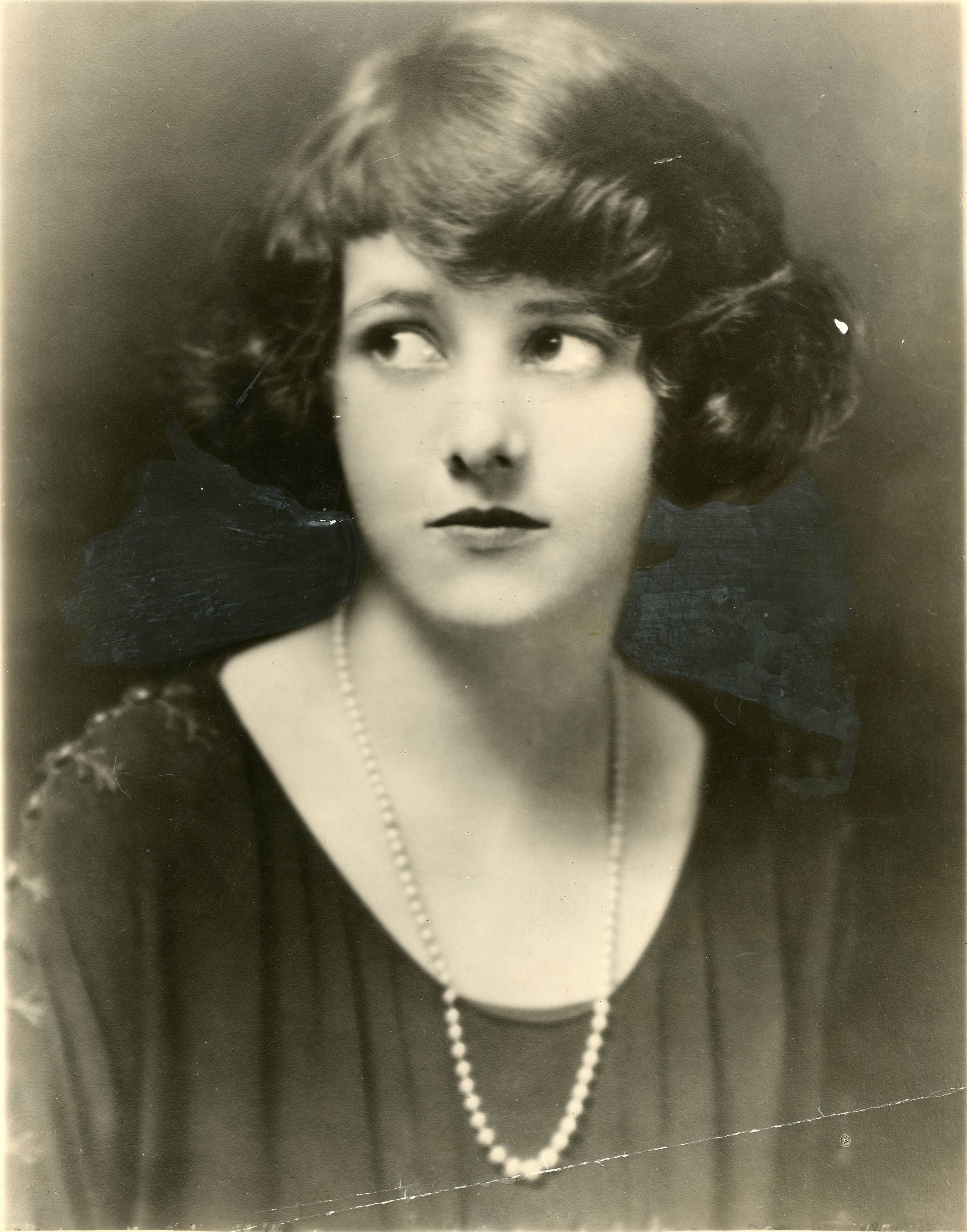
- Born: Frederica Binney; August 24, 1900; Morristown, New Jersey, U.S.
- Died: August 28, 1957 (aged 57)
- Occupation: Actress
- Years active: 1918–1953
- Spouse: David Carleton Sloane (m. 1922)
- Relatives: Constance Binney (sister)

Frederica "Faire" Binney (August 24, 1900 – August 28, 1957) was an American stage and film actress.

== Biography ==
Born Frederica Binney in Morristown, New Jersey, she was the daughter of Horace Binney, a lawyer, and Gertrude Miles Binney. She was educated in private schools in Concord, Massachusetts. She starred in a number of films during the silent era after making her debut in the 1918 film Sporting Life alongside her sister Constance Binney. During the early 1950s she appeared in several small, uncredited parts.

Binney married David Carleton Sloane in October 1922, at her mother's house in New York.

== Selected filmography ==
- Sporting Life (1918)
- Woman (1918)
- Here Comes the Bride (1919)
- Open Your Eyes (1919)
- The Wonder Man (1920)
- The Blue Pearl (1920)
- Madonnas and Men (1920)
- The Girl from Porcupine (1921)
- A Man's Home (1921)
- Frontier of the Stars (1921)
- A Wide Open Town (1922)
- What Fools Men Are (1922)
- Loyal Lives (1923)
- Second Youth (1924)
- The Man Without a Heart (1924)
- The Speed Spook (1924)
- The Lost Chord (1925)
- False Pride (1925)
- Three Guys Named Mike (1951)
- Monkey Business (1952)
- Dream Wife (1953)

== Bibliography ==
- Goble, Alan. The Complete Index to Literary Sources in Film. Walter de Gruyter, 1999.
- John T. Soister, Henry Nicolella & Steve Joyce. American Silent Horror, Science Fiction and Fantasy Feature Films, 1913-1929. McFarland, 2014.
