= Martha Hedman =

American dramatist

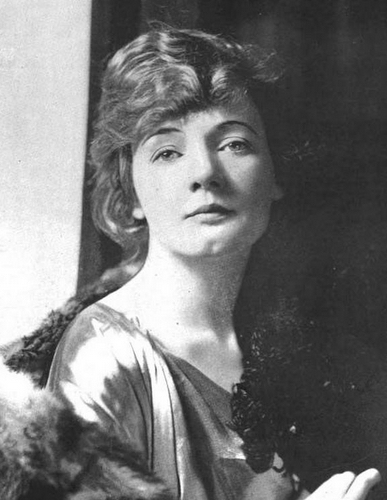
- Photo of Hedman, published in 1918
- Born: Märta Hedman; August 12, 1883; Östersund, Sweden
- Died: June 20, 1974 (aged 90); DeLand, Florida, U.S.
- Occupation: Actress
- Years active: 1905–1942
- Spouse: Henry Arthur House
- Children: 1
- Relatives: Marguerite Leslie (sister)

Martha Hedman (August 12, 1883 – June 20, 1974) was a Swedish-American stage actress popular on the Broadway stage.

== Biography ==
She was born to Johan Hedman and Ingrid Kempe in Östersund, in Jämtland County, Sweden. She studied for the stage under the tutelage of Siri von Essen the wife of playwright and novelist, August Strindberg. She first appeared on the stage in February 1905 in Helsinki, Finland in a Hans Christian Andersen fairy tale. For the next six years appeared in Sweden, Finland and Germany in plays by William Shakespeare, Leo Tolstoy, Gerhart Hauptmann and Ludwig Fulda.

In 1912 theatrical producer Charles Frohman brought Hedman to America and she shared the stage with John Drew. She appears in several of Charles Frohman's productions. In 1915, she appeared in The Trap produced by Arthur Hammerstein. One of her more notable performance was in the 1915-1916 comedy The Boomerang, produced by David Belasco. In 1921 she appeared in a big Shakespearean pageant on Broadway with several other top actresses of the period. She retired from the theater in 1922 but came back in 1942 for one play The First Crocus.

She appeared in one film The Cub directed by Maurice Tourneur in 1915.

During the first year of her career as an actress, she had toured with German-born actor Emile von der Osten (1848–1905). She had a daughter with von der Osten, Ella Alfrida (born on August 30, 1904, in Stockholm, Sweden - died January 17, 2000 Georgetown, South Carolina). Hedman was later married to Henry Arthur House with whom she co-wrote a play What's the Big Idea in 1926.

Martha Hedman wrote a book Uncle, Aunt and Jezabel (Charles Scribner's Sons, New York: 1949). The dedication reads: "To Henry Arthur -the winter of our discontent was turned into glorious summer". She subsequently wrote Mathias and Mathilda (Chapman & Hall. 1951) written under the name, Martha Hedman House. She died in Florida in 1974

Her sister was London actress Marguerite Leslie (1884 - 1958).
