= Le Secret du Lone Star =

1920 film

- Directed by: Jacques de Baroncelli
- Release date: 1920
- Country: France
- Language: Silent film

Le Secret du Lone Star is a 1920 French silent film directed by Jacques de Baroncelli. Along with la Rafale (1920), this was one of two Baroncelli films featuring Fannie Ward. Gaumont hoped that featuring an American actress would lead to a breakthrough in American cinema markets, but the two films were mostly unsuccessful and Baroncelli subsequently focused on French audiences.

Le Secret du Lone Star helped establish the adoption of orphaned or abandoned children by lone adults as a major subject of 1920s French cinema.

== Cast ==
- Fannie Ward
- Gabriel Signoret
- Henri Gouget
- Henri Janvier
- Rex McDougall
