= Frontier of the Stars =

1921 film

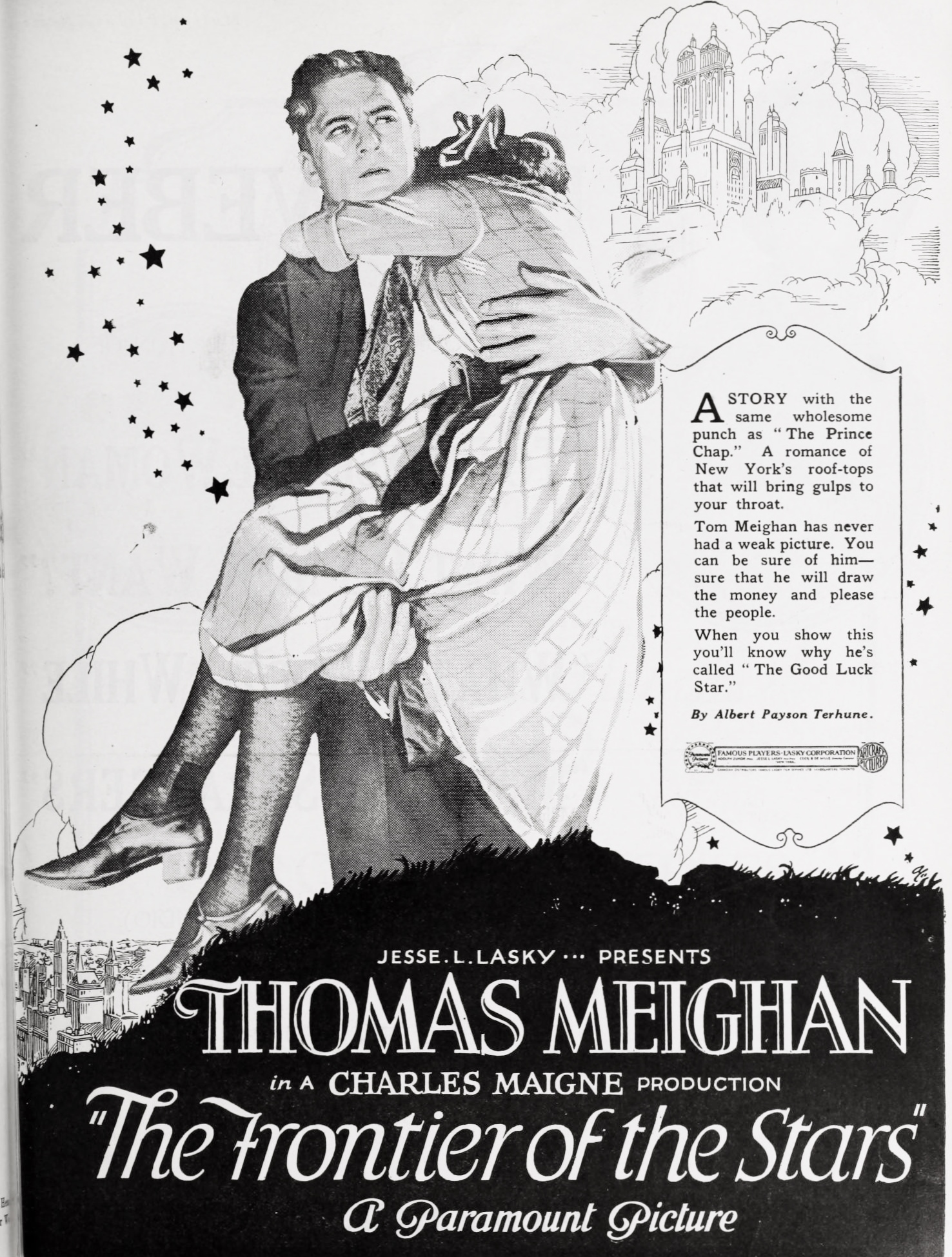
- Directed by: Charles Maigne
- Screenplay by: Charles Maigne; Albert Payson Terhune
- Produced by: Jesse L. Lasky
- Starring: Thomas Meighan; Faire Binney; Alphonse Ethier; Edward Ellis; Gus Weinberg; Florence Johns
- Cinematography: Faxon M. Dean
- Production company: Famous Players–Lasky Corporation
- Distributed by: Paramount Pictures
- Release date: January 30, 1921
- Running time: 60 minutes
- Country: United States
- Language: Silent..English intertitles

Frontier of the Stars is a lost 1921 American drama silent film directed by Charles Maigne and written by Charles Maigne and Albert Payson Terhune. The film stars Thomas Meighan, Faire Binney, Alphonse Ethier, Edward Ellis, Gus Weinberg and Florence Johns. The film was released January 20, 1921, by Paramount Pictures.

== Cast ==
- Thomas Meighan as Buck Leslie
- Faire Binney as Hilda Shea
- Alphonse Ethier as Phil Hoyt
- Edward Ellis as Gregory
- Gus Weinberg as Ganz
- Florence Johns as Mary Hoyt
