= Jean la Poudre =

- Directed by: Emile Chautard; Maurice Tourneur
- Written by: Maurice Tourneur
- Starring: Henri Gouget; Henry Roussel
- Production company: Société Française des Films Éclair
- Release date: 3 October 1913
- Country: France
- Languages: Silent; French intertitles

Jean la Poudre (English: John Powder) is a 1913 French silent drama film directed by Emile Chautard and Maurice Tourneur and starring Henri Gouget and Henry Roussel. It portrays Thomas Robert Bugeaud and his part in the Conquest of Algeria in the nineteenth century.

== Bibliography ==
- Waldman, Harry. Maurice Tourneur: The Life and Films. McFarland, 2001.
