= Tillie's Punctured Romance =

Tillie's Punctured Romance is the name of two early comedy films:

- Tillie's Punctured Romance (1914 film), starring Marie Dressler, Mabel Normand, and Charles Chaplin
- Tillie's Punctured Romance (1928 film), starring W. C. Fields
