= Henri Gouget =

French actor

- Occupation: Actor
- Years active: 1907–1922 (film)

Henri Gouget was a French film actor. He appeared in more than sixty films during the silent era.

== Selected filmography ==
- L'Enfant prodigue (1907)
- The Gaieties of the Squadron (1913)
- Jean la Poudre (1913)
- The System of Doctor Goudron (1913)
- Le Secret du Lone Star (1920)
- The Crime of Bouif (1922)

== Bibliography ==
- Waldman, Harry. Maurice Tourneur: The Life and Films. McFarland, 2001.
