= The Wishing Ring: An Idyll of Old England =

1914 film directed by Maurice Tourneur

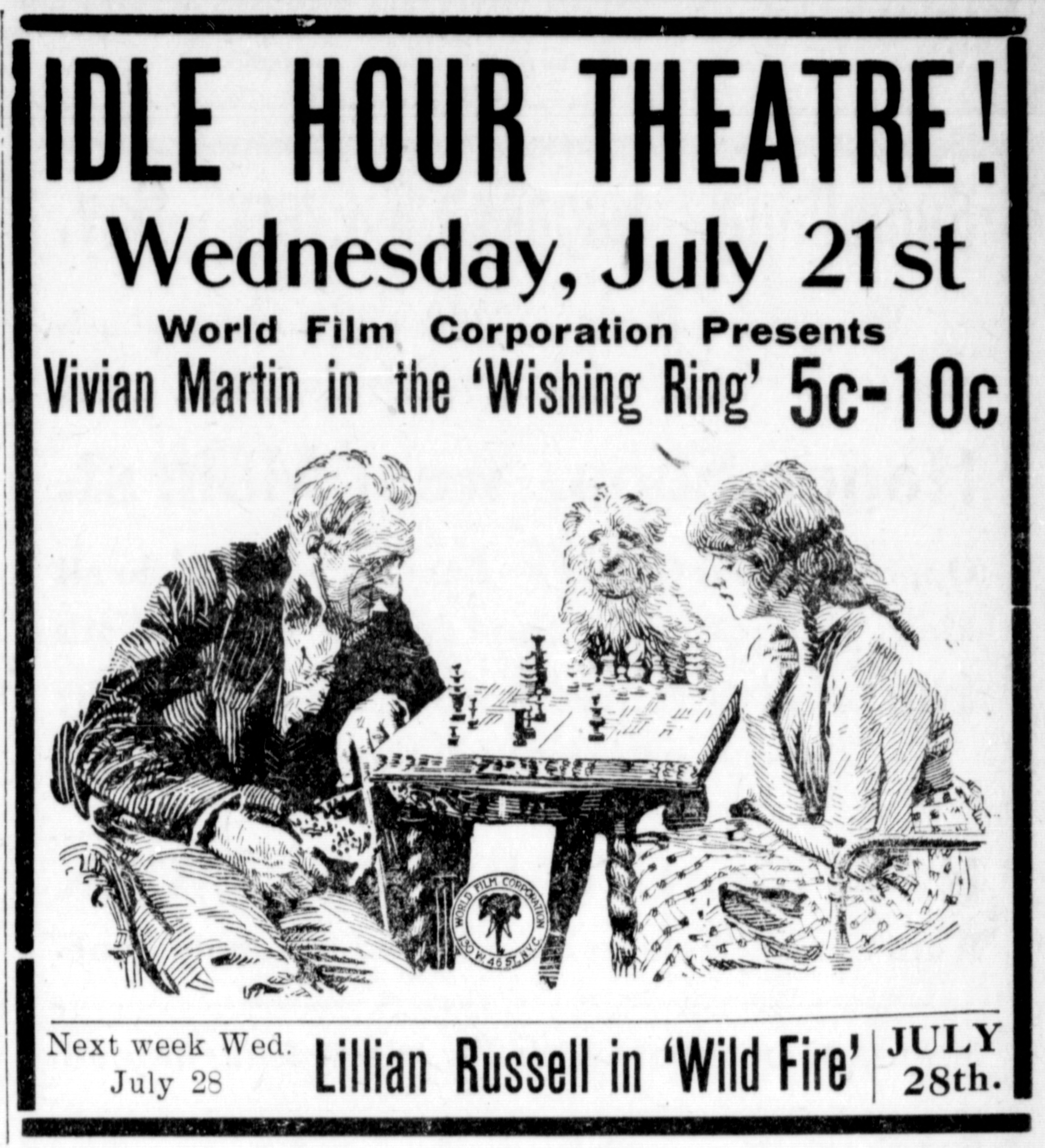
- Newspaper advertisement
- Directed by: Maurice Tourneur
- Written by: Maurice Tourneur (scenario)
- Based on: The Wishing Ring by Owen Davis
- Produced by: William A. Brady; Shubert family
- Starring: Vivian Martin
- Cinematography: John van den Broek
- Distributed by: World Film Company
- Release date: November 9, 1914
- Running time: 54 minutes
- Country: United States
- Languages: Silent; English intertitles

The Wishing Ring: An Idyll of Old England is a 1914 American silent comedy-drama film directed by Maurice Tourneur and starring Vivian Martin. Based on the 1910 play of the same name by Owen Davis that ran on Broadway starring Marguerite Clark, the film was shot in Fort Lee, New Jersey, by the World Film Corporation.

The film was thought to have been lost but a 16mm print of the film was rediscovered by film historian Kevin Brownlow in England. In 2012, it was selected for preservation in the United States National Film Registry by the Library of Congress as being "culturally, historically, or aesthetically significant".

== Plot ==
Giles is the rowdy son of the respected Earl of Bateson, and he routinely sends his father letters while he is away at school, assuring his father that he is achieving good marks in his classes. However, despite these assurances, Giles is kicked out of school for "Gross Misconduct", and he returns home to his father in disgrace.

Giles is given a tutor, but when the tutor falls asleep, Giles sneaks out to visit his Godfather, Mr. Annesley. Annesley has been having troubles himself with someone stealing his roses, and as he is about to leave town, he asks Giles to watch his rose garden for him while he is away. Giles soon learns that Sally, the parson's daughter, has been taking the roses, but when he confronts her about it, he realizes that her motives were pure, and she soon wins him over. Sally thinks he is simply a gardener, and she takes him to meet her father as the two become better acquainted.

One day, Giles pays some Gypsies to give Sally a silver ring, which they call a "Wishing ring" that will grant the wish of whoever wears it, and later, he sneaks behind Sally and kisses her after she wishes for "A kiss from her true love". After a few days, Giles receives word that Annesley is coming back, and he asks Giles to invite all of the neighbors to a lawn party to welcome him home. However, when Giles tells Sally, she realizes that she does not have the proper clothes for a fancy party. Undeterred, Giles goes out to buy her a new dress and shoes, and sneaks it into her home without her noticing, writing "From the Wishing Ring" on the box.

Before the party, Giles receives a letter from his father, telling him that he knows where he is, and that he does not wish to see him until he can earn a half-crown to prove his diligence. Later, at the party, the letter falls out of Giles pocket, and Sally and her father find the note and read it, unbeknownst to Giles. Sally, with her pure heart, takes it upon herself to reconcile the relationship between father and son, and she goes to the home of the Earl, quickly befriending him as they play chess together. In fact, Sally visits him every day, and she becomes very sad for him as he is pained by a serious case of Gout. She decides to ask the Gypsies about a cure for the Earl, and they tell her to visit the "Devils Cliff" at midnight, by the light of the moon, where she will find a magic herb that cures all disease.

That night, Sally leaves her house in the middle of the night at travels to Devils cliff, but the next morning, she is found seriously injured, having fallen off the cliff in the dark. As Sally is taken to her home, word spreads quickly that she has been injured, and the Earl immediately runs out of his house (with his gout) to make his way to her. Along the way though, his horse goes lame and he stops to borrow another horse, paying the man he borrows it from a half-crown. However, the horse actually belongs to Giles, and the man gives Giles the half crown while simultaneously telling him about Sally's fall.

Much like his father, Giles immediately runs to Sally, getting there just before his father, and the two briefly chat before the Earl arrives. Giles at first hides as his father comes in to check on Sally, but soon Giles comes out, angering his father. However, Sally tells the Earl that he must forgive his son, as he has fulfilled his conditions and earned a half-crown. The two smile and embrace each other, and all is well.

The film ends with a celebratory feast at the wedding of Sally and Giles.

The Wishing Ring – An Idyll Of Old England (1914)

== Cast ==
- Vivian Martin – Sally, The parson's daughter
- Alec B. Francis – The Earl of Bateson
- Chester Barnett – The Earl's Son Giles
- Gyp Williams – The Orphan
- Simeon Wiltsie – The Parson
- Walter Morton – Mr. Annesley
- Johnny Hines – Jolly Boy (billed as John Hines)
- Rose Melville – Sis Hopkins
- Frederick Truesdell
- Holbrook Blinn
- James Young
