= Rose of the Rancho (1914 film) =

1914 film

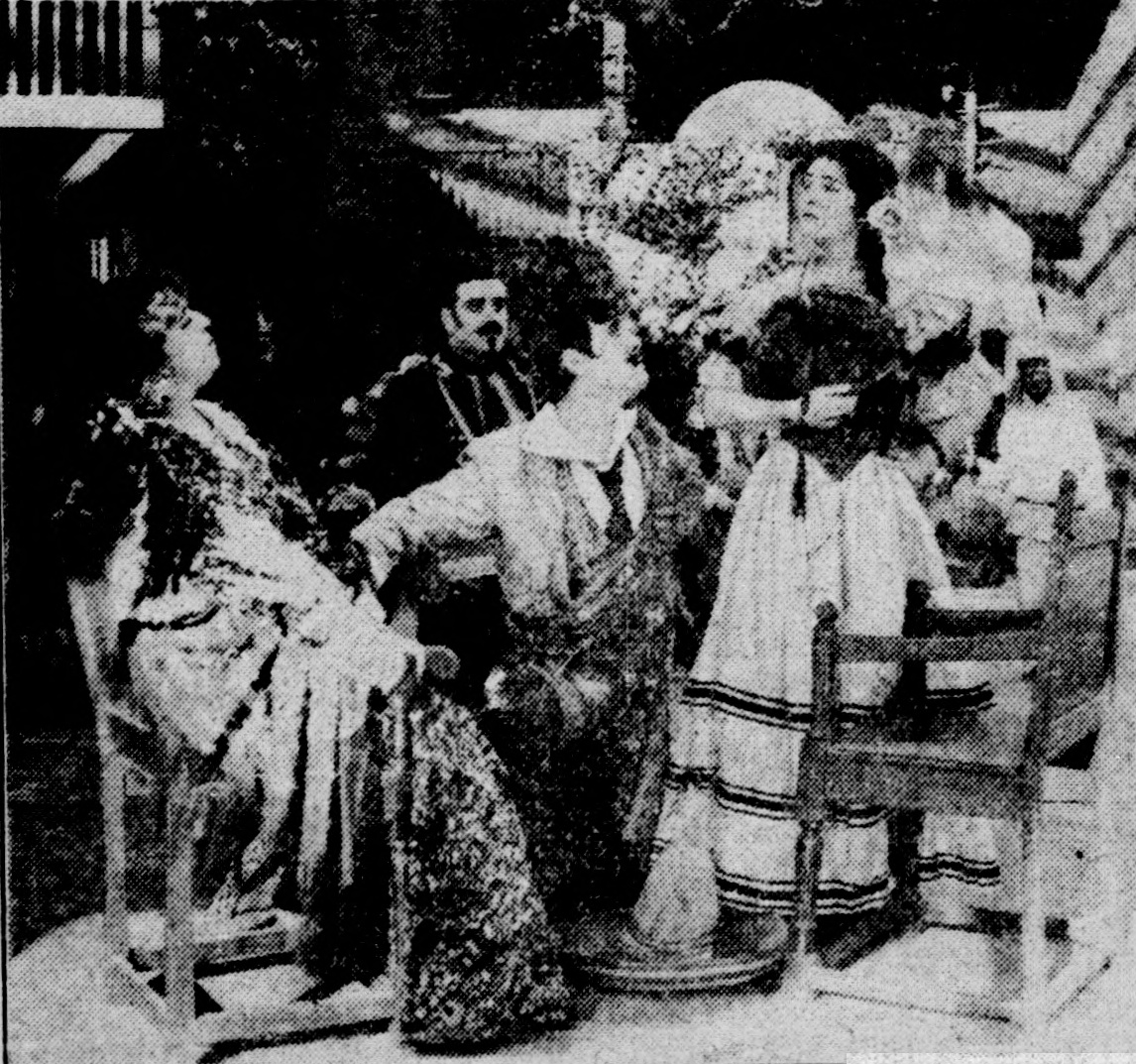
- Scene from the film.
- Directed by: Cecil B. DeMille
- Written by: David Belasco (play); Richard Walton Tully (play); Cecil B. DeMille
- Produced by: Cecil B. DeMille; Jesse L. Lasky
- Starring: Bessie Barriscale
- Cinematography: Alvin Wyckoff
- Edited by: Cecil B. DeMille
- Production company: Jesse Lasky Feature Plays
- Distributed by: Paramount Pictures
- Release date: November 15, 1914
- Running time: 50 minutes
- Country: United States
- Languages: Silent; English intertitles

Rose of the Rancho is a 1914 American silent Western film directed by Cecil B. DeMille. It is based upon the play of the same name by David Belasco and Richard Walton Tully. The film cost $16,988 to make, and grossed $87,028.

The film was remade in 1936 by Paramount and starred John Boles and Gladys Swarthout.

== Plot ==
Esra Kincaid takes land by force and, having taken the Espinoza land, his sights are set on the Castro rancho. US government agent Kearney holds him off till the cavalry shows up and he can declare his love for Juanita "The Rose of the Rancho".

== Cast ==
- Bessie Barriscale as Juanita
- Dick La Reno as Esra Kincaid
- Jack W. Johnston as Kearney, Government Agent (as J.W. Johnston)
- Monroe Salisbury as Don Luis Del Torre
- James Neill as Padre Antonio
- Sydney Deane as Espinoza
- William Elmer as Half Breed
- Jane Darwell as Senora Castro Kenton, Juanita's
- Al Ernest Garcia
- Jeanie Macpherson (as Jeanie McPherson)
- Mrs. Lewis McCord
- Francisca de la Vinna as Priest at wedding ceremony
- William C. deMille (uncredited)
- Lucien Littlefield (uncredited)

== Preservation ==
A complete 35 mm print of Rose of the Rancho is held by the George Eastman Museum in Rochester, New York.
