= Maurice Tourneur =

French film director and screenwriter (1876–1961)

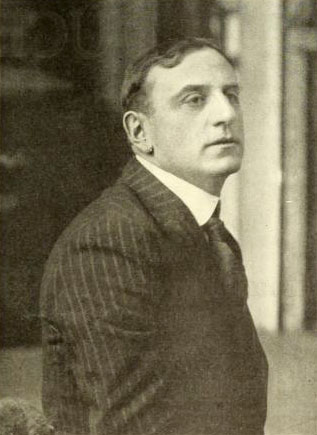
- Tourneur in 1916
- Born: Maurice Félix Thomas; 2 February 1876; Épinettes, Paris, France
- Died: 4 August 1961 (aged 85); Paris, France
- Resting place: Père Lachaise Cemetery
- Spouse(s): Fernande Petit (m. 1904, divorced) Louise Lagrange
- Children: Jacques Tourneur

Maurice Félix Thomas (French pronunciation: [mɔʁis feliks tɔmɑ]; 2 February 1876 – 4 August 1961), known as Maurice Tourneur (pronounced [tuʁnœʁ]), was a French film director and screenwriter.

== Life ==
Born Maurice Félix Thomas in the Épinettes district (17th arrondissement of Paris), his father was a wholesaler. As a young man, Maurice Thomas first trained as a graphic designer and a magazine illustrator but was soon drawn to the theater. In 1904, he married the actress Fernande Petit. They had a son, Jacques (1904–1977), who would follow his father into the film industry, establishing his own reputation as a director of American films in the 1940s and 1950s.

Using the stage name Maurice Tourneur, he began his show business career performing in secondary roles on stage and eventually toured England and South America as part of the theater company for the great star Gabrielle Réjane. Drawn to the new art of filmmaking, in 1911 he began working as an assistant director for the Éclair company. A quick learner and an innovator, within a short time he was directing films on his own using major French stars of the day such as Polaire.

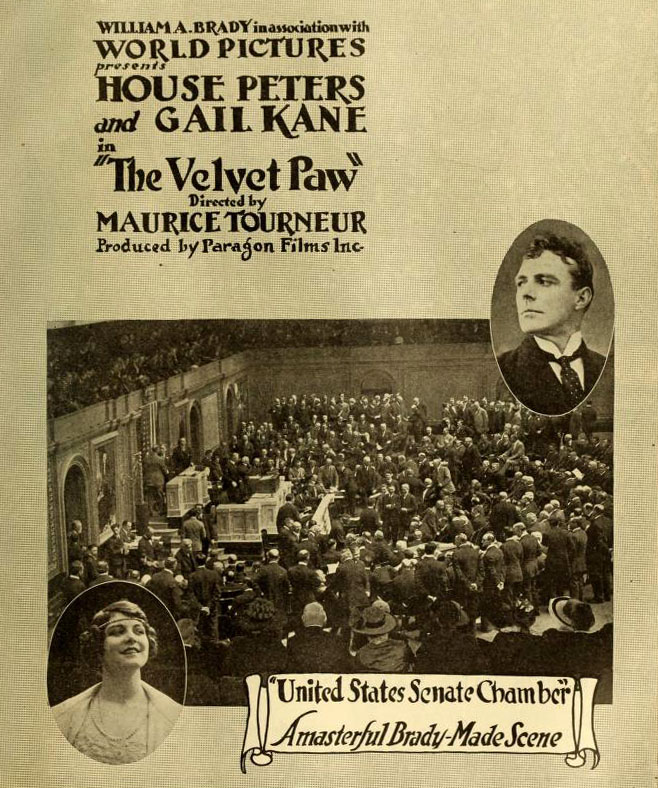
The Velvet Paw (1916)

In 1914, with the expansion of the giant French film companies into the United States market, Tourneur moved to New York City to direct silent films for Éclair's American branch studio in Fort Lee, New Jersey before moving to William A. Brady's World Film Corporation, where he directed important early American feature-length films such as The Wishing Ring, Alias Jimmy Valentine, The Cub (Martha Hedman's only screen performance) and Trilby, the last starring Clara Kimball Young and noted stage actor Wilton Lackaye as Svengali. Before long, Maurice Tourneur was a major and respected force in American film and a founding member of the East Coast chapter of the Motion Picture Directors Association. As the feature film evolved in the mid 1910s, he and his team (comprising screenwriter Charles Maigne, art director Ben Carré, and cameramen John van den Broek and Lucien Andriot) coupled exceptional technological skill with unique pictorial and architectural sensibilities in their productions, giving their films a visual distinctiveness that met with critical acclaim.

"Making pictures is a commercial business, the same as making soap and, to be successful, one must make a commodity that will sell. We have a choice between making bad, silly, childish and useless pictures, which make a lot of money, and make everybody rich, or nice stories, which nobody wants to see...the American film producers will have to change entirely their machine-made stories and come to a closer and truer view of humanity ..."
—Maurice Tourneur in Shadowland, May 1920.

Tourneur admired D. W. Griffith and considered the skill level of American actors at the time ahead of their counterparts in Europe. Of the actresses he worked with, he called Mary Pickford the finest screen actress in the world and believed that stage actress Elsie Ferguson was a brilliant artist. However, Tourneur opposed the evolving star system that Carl Laemmle had begun with his advertising campaign for actress Florence Lawrence.

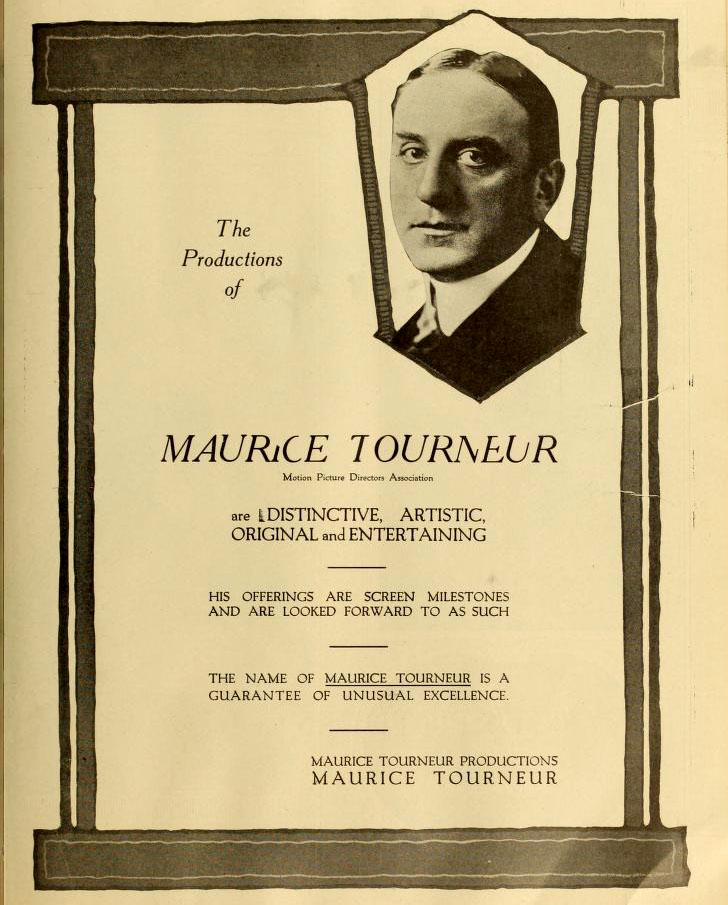
Advertisement (1919)

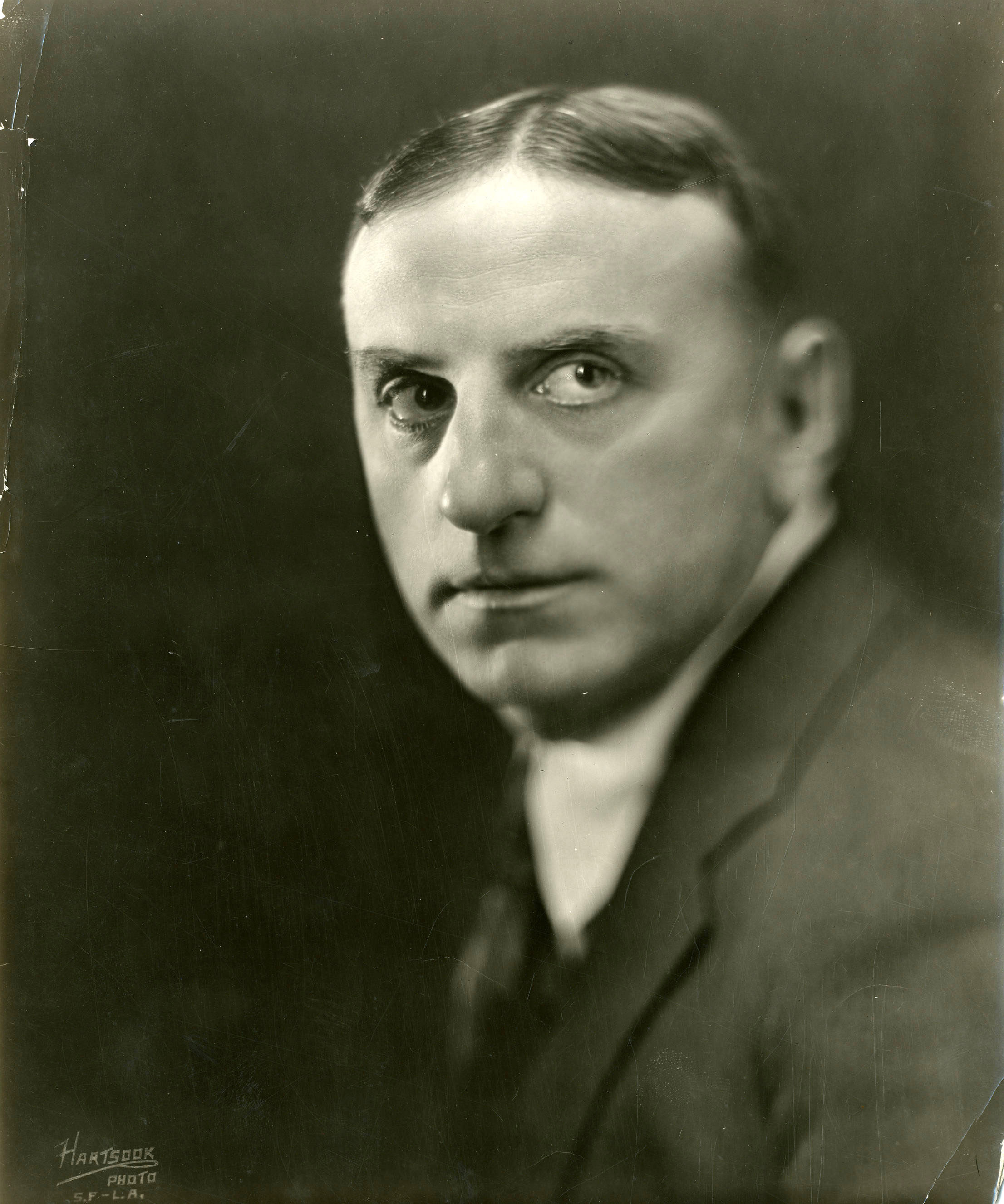
In 1920, photographed by Fred Hartsook

After directing several innovative films for Adolph Zukor's Artcraft Pictures Corporation (which released through Paramount) in 1917 and 1918, Tourneur launched his own production company with the film Sporting Life. In 1921 he became a naturalized citizen of the United States. By 1922 he believed that the future of the film industry lay in Hollywood and the following year he was hired by Samuel Goldwyn to go to the West Coast and make a film version of the Hall Caine novel The Christian. However, Tourneur's career in the United States faltered in the 1920s as his pictorialism sometimes hampered the narrative drive of his later films, and he also separated from his wife Fernande in 1923. He was removed from production on Metro-Goldwyn-Mayer's version of Jules Verne's The Mysterious Island in 1928, and this marked the end of his American career.

After his trouble with MGM, Tourneur decided to move back to his native France. There, he continued to make films both at home and in Germany, easily making the change to talkies. In 1933 he met his second wife, actress Louise Lagrange (1898–1979), while shooting his film, L'Homme mystérieux. Tourneur went on to direct another two dozen films, several of which were crime thrillers, until a 1949 automobile accident in which he was seriously injured and lost a leg. Health and age prevented him from directing more films, but a voracious reader and a skilled hobby artist, he kept busy painting and translating detective novels from English into French.

After his death in 1961, Maurice Tourneur was interred in the Père Lachaise Cemetery in Paris.

Maurice Tourneur was honored with a star on the Hollywood Walk of Fame at 6243 Hollywood Blvd.

His 1917 film, The Poor Little Rich Girl, his 1918 film The Blue Bird and his 1920 film The Last of the Mohicans have since been deemed "culturally significant" by the United States Library of Congress and selected for preservation in the National Film Registry. Recently, the American Film Institute's Center for Film and Video Preservation and the National Archives of Canada have been cooperating on the restoration of Tourneur's 1915 film, The Cub.

== Partial filmography ==
- Jean la Poudre (1913)
- The System of Doctor Goudron aka The Lunatics (1913)
- The Mystery of the Yellow Room (1913)
- Figures de cire (1914)
- Mother (1914) Lost
- The Man of the Hour (1914) Lost
- The Wishing Ring (1914) Extant
- Alias Jimmy Valentine (1915) Extant
- The Cub (1915) Extant
- The Ivory Snuff Box (1915) Lost
- The Butterfly on the Wheel (1915)
- The Pawn of Fate (1915) Extant
- The Hand of Peril (1916) Lost
- The Closed Road (1916) Extant
- The Velvet Paw (1916) Lost
- The Rail Rider (1916) Extant (fragments)
- A Girl's Folly (1916) Extant
- The Whip (1917) Extant
- The Undying Flame (1917) Lost
- Exile (1917) Lost
- The Law of the Land (1917) Lost
- The Pride of the Clan (1917) Extant
- The Poor Little Rich Girl (1917) Extant
- Barbary Sheep (1917) Incomplete
- The Rise of Jennie Cushing (1917) Lost
- Rose of the World (1918) Extant
- The Blue Bird (1918) Extant
- Prunella (1918) Incomplete
- A Doll's House (1918) Lost
- The Sporting Life (1918) Lost
- Woman (1918) Extant
- My Lady's Garter (1919) Lost
- The White Heather (1919) Extant
- The Life Line (1919) Extant
- Victory (1919) Extant
- The Broken Butterfly (1919) Extant
- The County Fair (1920) Extant
- The Great Redeemer (1920) Lost
- Treasure Island (1920) Lost
- The White Circle (1920) Lost
- Deep Waters (1920) Lost
- The Last of the Mohicans (1920) Extant
- The Bait (1921) Lost
- Foolish Matrons (1921) Extant
- Lorna Doone (1922) Extant
- The Brass Bottle (1923) Lost
- Les Deux Gosses (1923)
- The Christian (1923) Extant
- The Isle of Lost Ships (1923) Lost
- While Paris Sleeps (1923) Lost
- Torment (1924) Lost
- The White Moth (1924) Extant
- The Sporting Life (1925) Extant
- Never the Twain Shall Meet (1925) Lost
- Aloma of the South Seas (1926) Lost
- Old Loves and New (1926) Lost
- The Crew (1928)
- The Ship of Lost Souls (1929)
- Accusée, levez-vous! (Accused, Stand Up!) (1930)
- Departure (1931)
- Dance Hall (1931)
- In the Name of the Law (1932)
- Les Gaietés de l'escadron (1932)
- The Two Orphans (1933)
- Le Voleur (1933)
- Justin de Marseille (1934)
- Koenigsmark (1935)
- Samson (1936)
- The Patriot (1938)
- Katia (1938)
- Sins of Youth (1941)
- Volpone (1941)
- La Main du diable (The Hand of the Devil, aka Carnival of Sinners) (1943)
- Cécile est morte (1944)
- After Love (1948)
- Dilemma of Two Angels (1948)
