= A Race of Noblemen =

1927 film

- Directed by: Tony D'Algy
- Written by: Luis S. Enciso (novel); Enrique Suárez de Deza (novel)
- Produced by: Ricardo Sánchez
- Starring: Tony D'Algy; Helena D'Algy; José Nieto
- Cinematography: Alberto Arroyo; Frederik Fuglsang
- Production company: Unidad Cinematográfica Española
- Release date: 1927
- Country: Spain
- Languages: Silent; Spanish intertitles

A Race of Noblemen (Spanish:Raza de hidalgos) is a 1927 Spanish silent film directed by and starring Tony D'Algy. It was shot at the Berlin studios of UFA as part of a co-production agreement.

== Cast ==
- Helena D'Algy
- Tony D'Algy
- Mercedes Jares
- José Nieto

== Bibliography ==
- Labanyi, Jo & Pavlović, Tatjana. A Companion to Spanish Cinema. John Wiley & Sons, 2012.
