= Gove (disambiguation) =

Gove most commonly refers to Michael Gove (born 1967), a British politician and journalist.

Gove may also refer to:

== People ==
- Gove (name)

== Places ==
=== Australia ===
- Gove, former name of Nhulunbuy, a town in the Northern Territory
- Gove Peninsula, Northern Territory, Australia
  - Gove Airport in Gove Peninsula

=== United States ===
- Gove County, Kansas
  - Gove City, Kansas
  - Gove Township, Gove County, Kansas

=== Other countries ===
- Gove, Bhiwandi, a village in the Thane district of Maharashtra, India
- Gove (Baião), a civil parish in the municipality of Baião, Portugal - see List of parishes of Portugal: B

== Other uses ==
- Gove Australian Football League
