= Joseph Depew =

American actor (1912–1988)

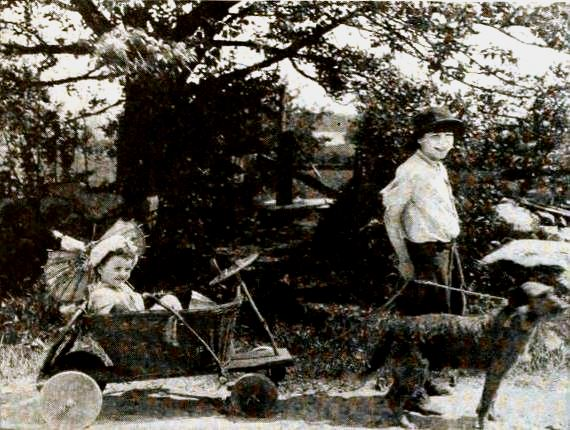
- Still with Helen Rowland and Joseph Depew in Timothy's Quest (1922)
- Born: July 11, 1912; Harrison, New Jersey
- Died: October 30, 1988 (aged 76); Escondido, California
- Occupations: Television director and producer, actor
- Years active: 1922–1971
- Spouse: Dorothy Depew

Joseph Depew (July 11, 1912 – October 30, 1988) was an American television director and producer and actor.

== Early years ==
Born on July 11, 1912, in Harrison, New Jersey, Depew spent much of his youth in northern Maine.

== Career ==
Depew began his career as a child stage actor at the age of three. He was influenced by his mother, also a stage performer. He later worked as a second unit director or an assistant director in 22 films and 26 television series episodes. He directed numerous episodes across the first six seasons of The Beverly Hillbillies, an actor in 14 films, an assistant producer in 11 episodes of The Bob Cummings Show and a production manager in one movie.

Depew's work on Broadway included portraying Andrew Lane Jr. in The Hero (1921).

== Personal life and death ==
Depew was married to Dorothy Depew. They had eight children. On October 30, 1988, Depew died at the age of 76 in Escondido, California.

== Selected filmography ==
Film
Year	Film	Role	Notes
1922	Timothy's Quest	Timothy	
1923	The Daring Years	LaMotte son	
1923	The Steadfast Heart	Angus Burke, as a child	
1924	The Fifth Horseman	Sonny	
1925	The Swan	Prince George	
1929	Sweetie	Freddie Fry	
1931	Seas Beneath	Naval reservist	Uncredited
1941	Niagara Falls	Elevator Boy	Uncredited
1944	The Bridge of San Luis Rey	-	Assistant director
1945	Captain Kidd	-	Assistant director
1946	The Diary of a Chambermaid	-	Assistant director
1947	Intrigue	-	Assistant director
1948	Lulu Belle	-	Assistant director Credited as Joseph DePew
1949	Mrs. Mike	-	Assistant director Credited as Joseph DePew
1950	The Golden Gloves Story	-	Assistant director Credited as Joseph Depew
1952	Park Row	-	Assistant director
Television
Year	Title	Role	Notes
1953–1961	The Jack Benny Program	-	Assistant director, 6 episodes
1955–1958	The Bob Cummings Show	-	Assistant director, 15 episodes
1962–1963	Don't Call Me Charlie!	-	Director, unknown number of episodes
1963	Petticoat Junction	-	Assistant director, 3 episodes
1963–1969	The Beverly Hillbillies	-	Director, 144 episodes
