= Timothy's Quest =

Timothy's Quest may refer to:

- Timothy's Quest (1922 film), an American silent drama film
- Timothy's Quest (1936 film), an American comedy film
