= The Boob =

1926 film directed by William A. Wellman

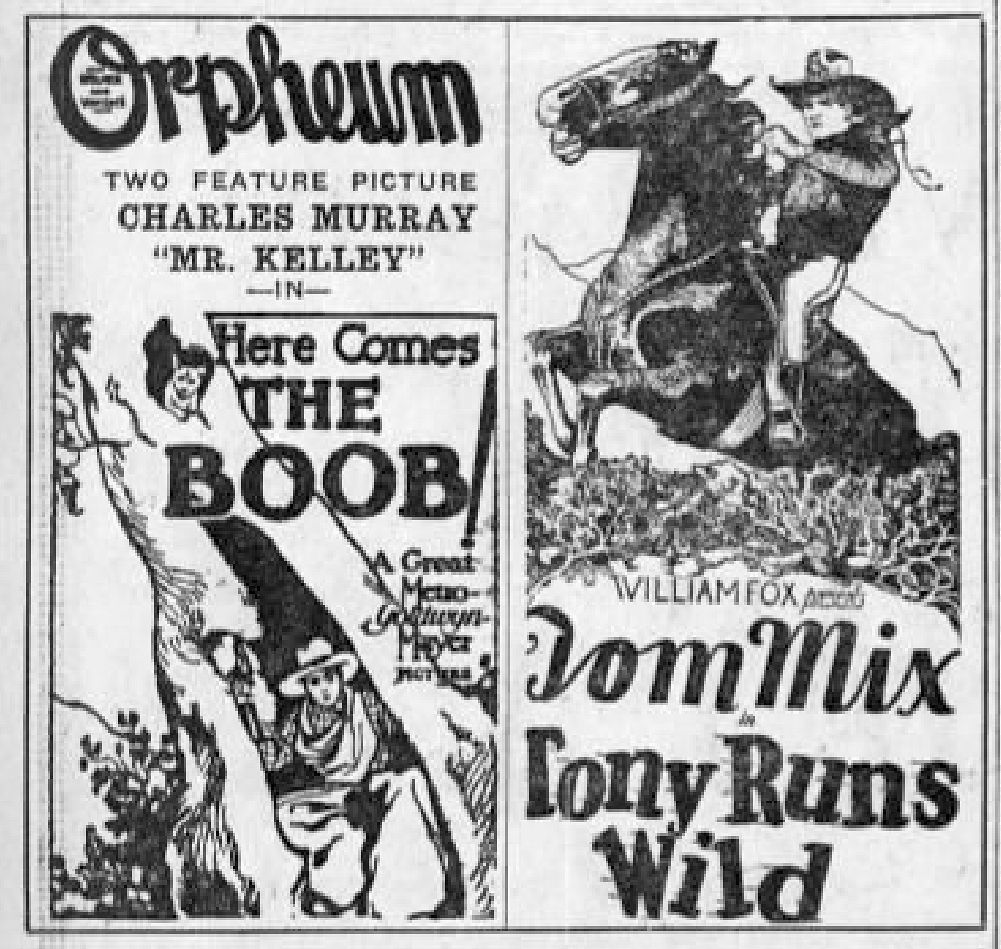
- Newspaper advertisement for The Boob and Tony Runs Wild (1926)
- Directed by: William A. Wellman
- Written by: Kenneth B. Clarke (scenario); Katherine Hilliker (titles); H. H. Caldwell (titles)
- Story by: George Scarborough; Annette Westbay
- Starring: Gertrude Olmstead; George K. Arthur; Joan Crawford; Charles Murray; Tony D'Algy
- Cinematography: William H. Daniels
- Edited by: Ben Lewis
- Production company: Metro-Goldwyn-Mayer
- Distributed by: Loew's, Inc.
- Release date: May 17, 1926
- Running time: 64 minutes
- Country: United States
- Language: Silent (English intertitles)

The Boob (1926) by William A. Wellman

The Boob (released in the UK as The Yokel) is a 1926 American silent romantic comedy film directed by William A. Wellman, and starring Gertrude Olmstead, Tony D'Algy, George K. Arthur, and Joan Crawford as a law enforcement agent.

== Plot ==
Peter Good, a courteous idealist, is in love with his childhood friend Amy. However, she is in a relationship with the urbane Harry Benson, whom she has only known for one week. Peter has two friends, Ham Bunn (who is accompanied with a dog Benzine) and Cactus Jim. Peter meets with Cactus Jim, who dresses him in his old cowboy gear, thinking it will impress Amy. Meanwhile, Harry pledges to have dinner with Amy at a roadhouse called "The Booklovers" and marry her before he drives off. Outside, Peter asks Amy to accompany him for a late-night walk but she declines. Distraught, Peter returns to Cactus Jim's barnyard home and follows after Harry, suspecting he is a bootlegger. Cactus Jim, who is a closet alcoholic, follows Peter hoping to find more liquor to drink.

Along the road, Peter meets an old lady and volunteers to give her a ride home. He learns from her that the Booklovers are suspected of being in league with bootleggers. Peter drops her off at her retirement home, which houses impoverished women. Meanwhile, Ham Bunn ventures on his separate journey to find Peter. Later that night, Amy has dinner with Harry at the Booklovers, which uses antique book covers as a disguise to hold alcoholic beverages. There, Jane, an undercover Prohibition agent, shares information with her colleagues that Harry is the leader of the bootlegging ring. She attempts to eavesdrop on a closed-door meeting but is unsuccessful.

Peter arrives at the Booklovers and fires his gun in the air, frightening some patrons. However, he is thrown out. Cactus Jim arrives and hoards some used liquor bottles inside his clothes. Ham Bunn reunites with Peter near a graveyard. There, Jane approaches Peter who learns the bootleggers are planning to meet at a nearby mill. Peter and Ham Bunn arrive there where the bootleggers unearth a casket full of liquor bottles.

The next morning, they confront the bootleggers, but are beaten up. Harry arrives to transport the casket and throws an injured Peter into the river. Cactus Jim and Ham Bunn save Peter and they all pursue Harry. Peter catches up to Harry and fights him inside his vehicle, while Amy is driving. The vehicle crashes into the same retirement home, injuring all occupants. Later on, Prohibition agents arrive and arrest Harry for bootlegging. Amy apologizes to her father while Jane awards Peter five thousand dollars for helping to stop Harry. Moved by Peter's bravery, Amy kisses him.

== Cast ==
- Gertrude Olmstead as Amy
- George K. Arthur as Peter Good
- Joan Crawford as Jane
- Charles Murray as Cactus Jim
- Tony D'Algy as Harry Benson (credited as Antonio D'Algy)
- Hank Mann as The Village Soda Clerk
- Edythe Chapman as The Old Lady (uncredited)
- Babe London as Fat Girl (uncredited)

== Preservation ==
According to the Library of Congress, a print of The Boob has been preserved by MGM.
