= The Great O'Malley =

1937 film by William Dieterle

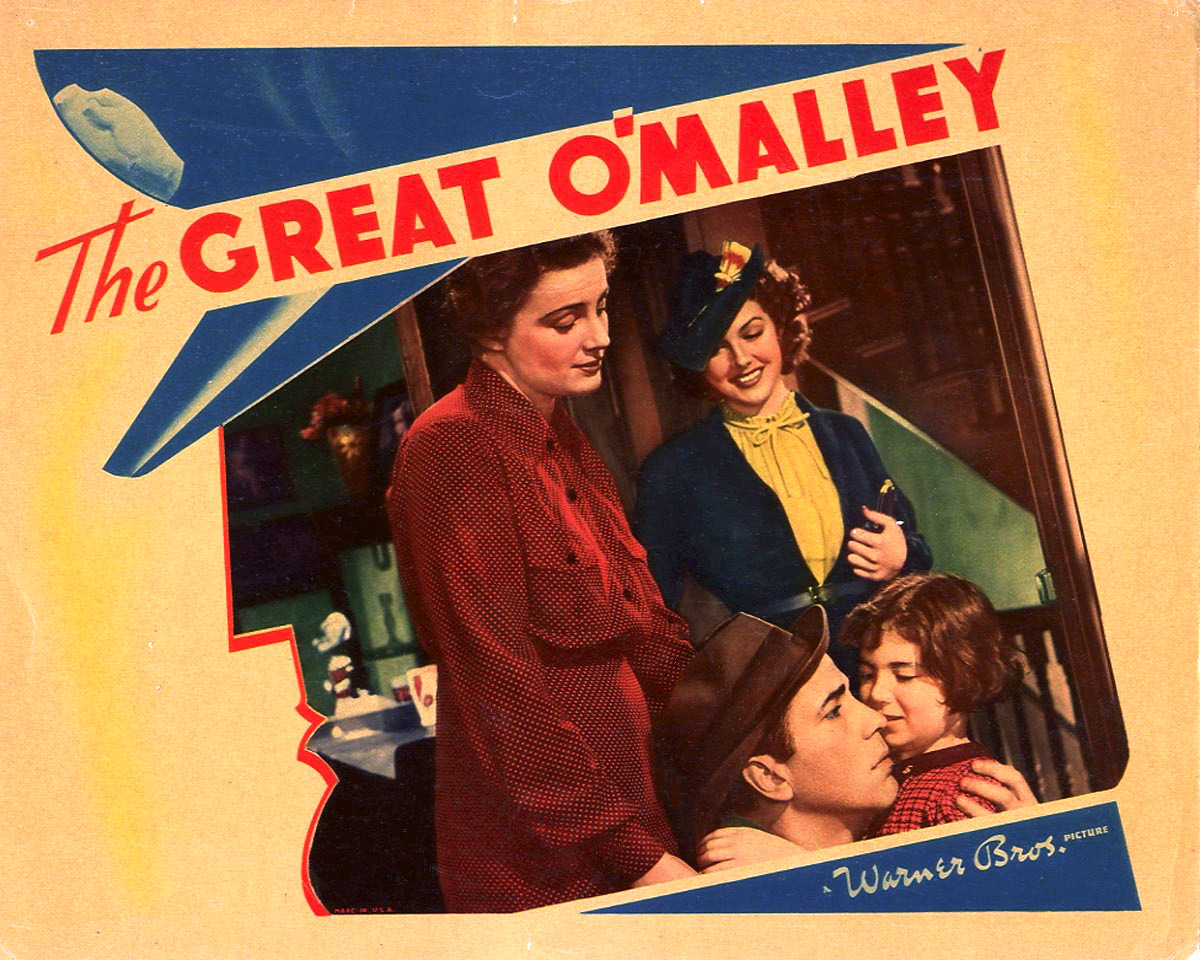
- Lobby card for the film.
- Directed by: William Dieterle
- Screenplay by: Milton Krims; Tom Reed
- Based on: The Making of O'Malley; 1924 story in Redbook by Gerald Beaumont
- Produced by: Jack L. Warner; Hal B. Wallis
- Starring: Pat O'Brien; Sybil Jason; Humphrey Bogart
- Cinematography: Ernest Haller
- Edited by: Warren Low
- Music by: Heinz Roemheld
- Production company: Warner Bros. Pictures
- Distributed by: Warner Bros. Pictures
- Release date: February 13, 1937
- Running time: 71 minutes
- Country: United States
- Language: English

The Great O'Malley is a 1937 American crime drama film directed by William Dieterle and starring Pat O'Brien, Sybil Jason, Humphrey Bogart, and Ann Sheridan. The 1925 silent version The Making of O'Malley starred Milton Sills, Dorothy Mackaill and Helen Rowland.

== Plot ==
James O'Malley (Pat O'Brien) is an overzealous, unforgiving officer who abides by the letter of the law and hands out citations for petty infractions. He pulls over John Phillips (Humphrey Bogart) for a noisy muffler, delaying him long enough to cause him to be late for arriving at his new job that would help him to take care of his wife (Frieda Inescort) and crippled daughter, Barbara (Sybil Jason). After losing the job for being late, Phillips becomes desperate and attempts to pawn his war medals and a revolver. The store owner does not want to pay him what the items are worth, causing Phillips to become enraged, knocking the clerk down, and taking money from the cash register. This leads to Phillips being arrested and sentenced to prison for robbery. Meanwhile, O'Malley is being ridiculed for being too hard on normal working people and gets demoted by Captain Cromwell (Donald Crisp), being reassigned as a school crossing guard at the same school where Phillips' daughter attends. Barbara and O'Malley strike up a friendship, while he falls in love with her teacher, Judy Nolan (Ann Sheridan), whose disdain softens his disciplinarian attitude. After O'Malley finds out that Barbara is the daughter of the man that he sent to jail, he provides for her and her mother, secretly finding the physician to fix Barbara's crippled leg, working out a payment plan to fund it, and helping to get Phillips paroled. Unaware of O'Malley's help, Phillips, seeking revenge, shoots the officer out of desperation, thinking O'Malley is simply hounding him straight after his parole. O'Malley, further humanized by this experience, decides to exonerate Phillips, claiming that the shooting was accidentally brought on by himself, after tripping down the stairs. O'Malley soon recovers, and is reinstated to his old beat, with the respect of his fellow officers and the loving admiration of Judy.

== Cast ==
- Pat O'Brien as James Aloysius O'Malley
- Sybil Jason as Barbara "Babs" Phillips
- Humphrey Bogart as John Phillips
- Ann Sheridan as Judy Nolan
- Frieda Inescort as Mrs. Phillips
- Donald Crisp as Captain Cromwell
- Henry O'Neill as Defense Attorney
- Craig Reynolds as Motorist
- Hobart Cavanaugh as Pinky Holden
- Gordon Hart as Doctor
- Mary Gordon as Mrs. O'Malley
- Mabel Colcord as Mrs. Flaherty
- Frank Sheridan as Father Patrick
- Lillian Harmer as Miss Taylor
- Delmar Watson as Tubby
- Frank Reicher as Dr. Larson
- Granville Bates as Jake, Bar Proprietor (uncredited)
- Stanley Fields as Convict in Prison Shop (uncredited)
- Armand Wright as Vegetable Peddler (uncredited)
- Raymond Brown as Factory Owner (uncredited)
- Egon Brecher as Pawnbroker (uncredited)

== Critical reception ==
Variety reviewed the film in their December, 1936 edition, and wrote that the plot was the film’s "chief drawback" and that it was "no fault of [Pat O’Brien and Humphrey Bogart] that this film shoots wide of its mark…. Dieterle has made a valiant attempt to overcome the screenplay’s weaknesses …. There’s practically no action for the first 40 minutes, and subsequent footage hardly is in the very exciting class. If anything, the picture depends almost wholly on the appeal of moppet [Sybil] Jason."

In their March, 1937 edition, Modern Screen gave the film a one-star review saying that Pat O’Brien "goes through his usual paces …. for 15,000 feet of film" until Ann Sheridan and Sybil Jason enter the story and inspire him to develop some warmth. It concluded that "maybe we’re short on heart ourselves, but this whole set up left us cold."
