= Incorrigible =

Incorrigible may refer to:

- Incorrigibility
- Incorrigible (1946 film)
- Incorrigible (1975 film)

== See also ==
- The Incorrigible, a 1931 film
