= The White Dove (1942 film) =

- Directed by: Claudio de la Torre
- Written by: Alejandro Pérez Lugín (novel); José Andrés Vázquez (novel); Claudio de la Torre; Luis Fernández de Sevilla
- Starring: Juanita Reina; Tony D'Algy; Antonio Huelves
- Cinematography: Segismundo Pérez de Pedro 'Segis'
- Edited by: Juan J. Doria
- Music by: Manuel L. Quiroga
- Production company: Diana Exclusivas
- Distributed by: Diana Exclusivas
- Release date: 2 November 1942
- Running time: 76 minutes
- Country: Spain
- Language: Spanish

The White Dove (Spanish: La blanca Paloma) is a 1942 Spanish musical drama film directed by Claudio de la Torre and starring Juanita Reina, Tony D'Algy and Antonio Huelves. It was remade in 1955 as It Happened in Seville with Reina again in the role of Esperanza.

== Cast ==
- Juanita Reina as Esperanza
- Tony D'Algy as Juan Antonio
- Antonio Huelves as Alberto
- José Portes as Don Fernando
- Dolores Bremón as Tita Pasión
- Eloísa Mariscal as Martina
- Isabel Urcola as Setefilla
- Josefina de la Torre as La enfermera
- Narciso Ojeda as Tachuelita
- Rafael Ragel as Ponciles
- Félix Fernández as Licenciado
- José Andrés Vázquez as Don Ricardo

== Bibliography ==
- Eva Woods Peiró. White Gypsies: Race and Stardom in Spanish Musical Films. U of Minnesota Press, 2012.
