= Helena D'Algy =

Portuguese film actress (1906–1992)

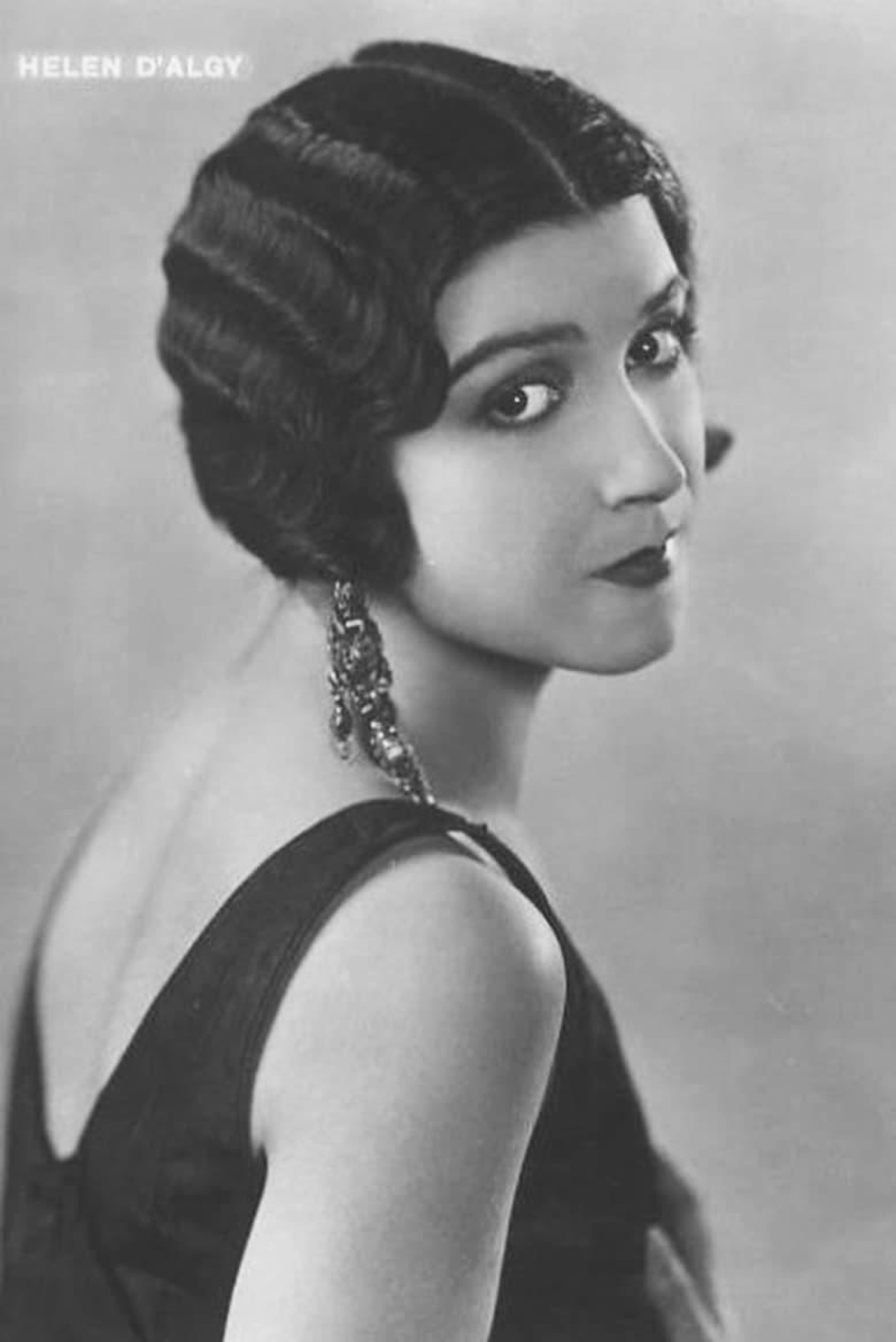
- D'Algy circa 1926
- Born: Antónia Lozano Guedes Infante; 18 June 1906; Madrid, Spain
- Died: 1992 (aged 85–86)
- Other name: Helen D'Algy
- Occupation: Actress
- Years active: 1924–1933

Helena D'Algy (June 18, 1906 – 1992) was a Portuguese opera singer and actress. She appeared in several Hollywood films during the silent era, most notably opposite Rudolph Valentino in A Sainted Devil (1924). D'Algy also performed on Broadway in the Ziegfeld Follies of 1923 and The Sex Fable.

== Biography ==
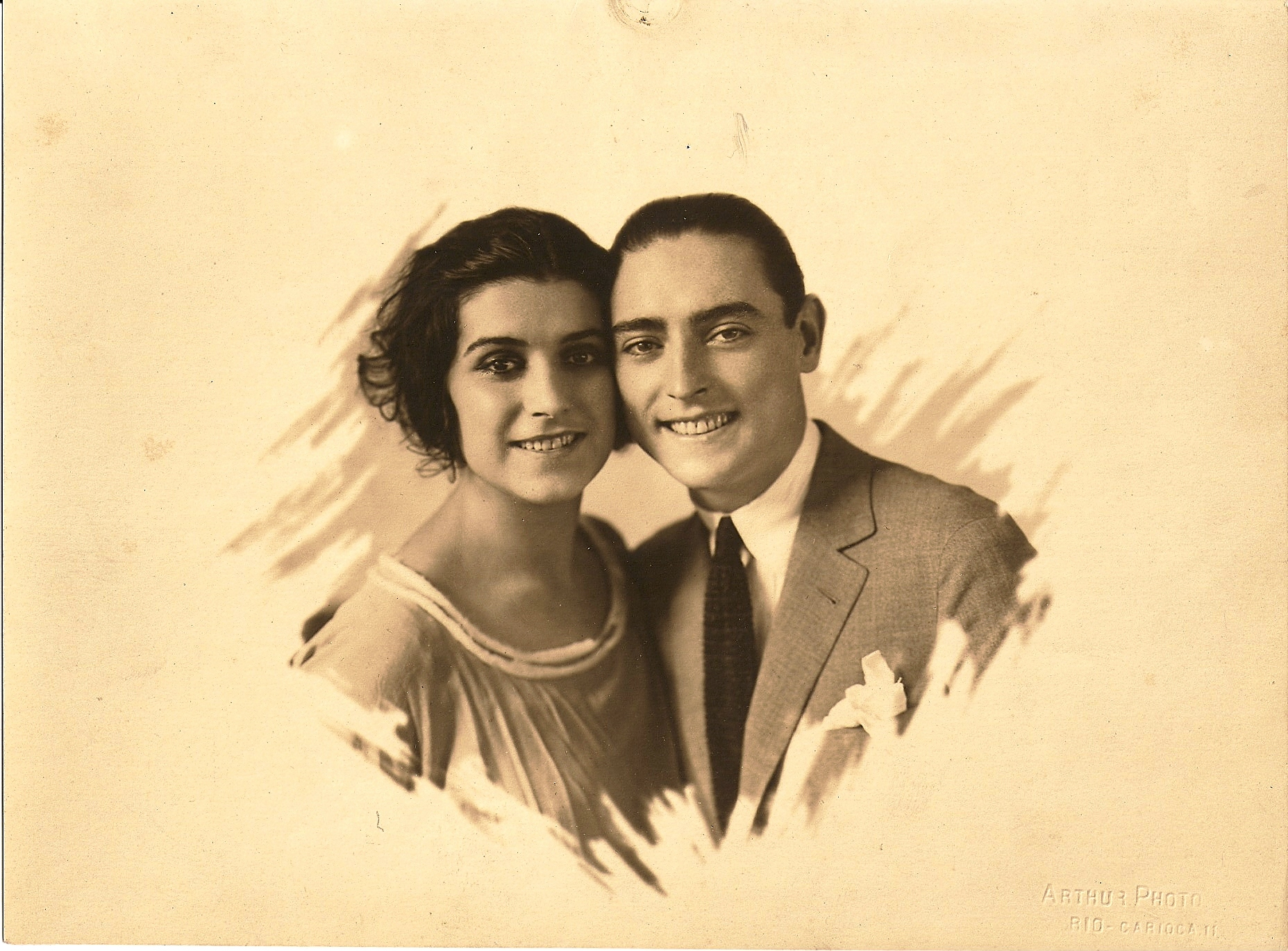
D'Algy and her brother Tony D'Algy, 1923

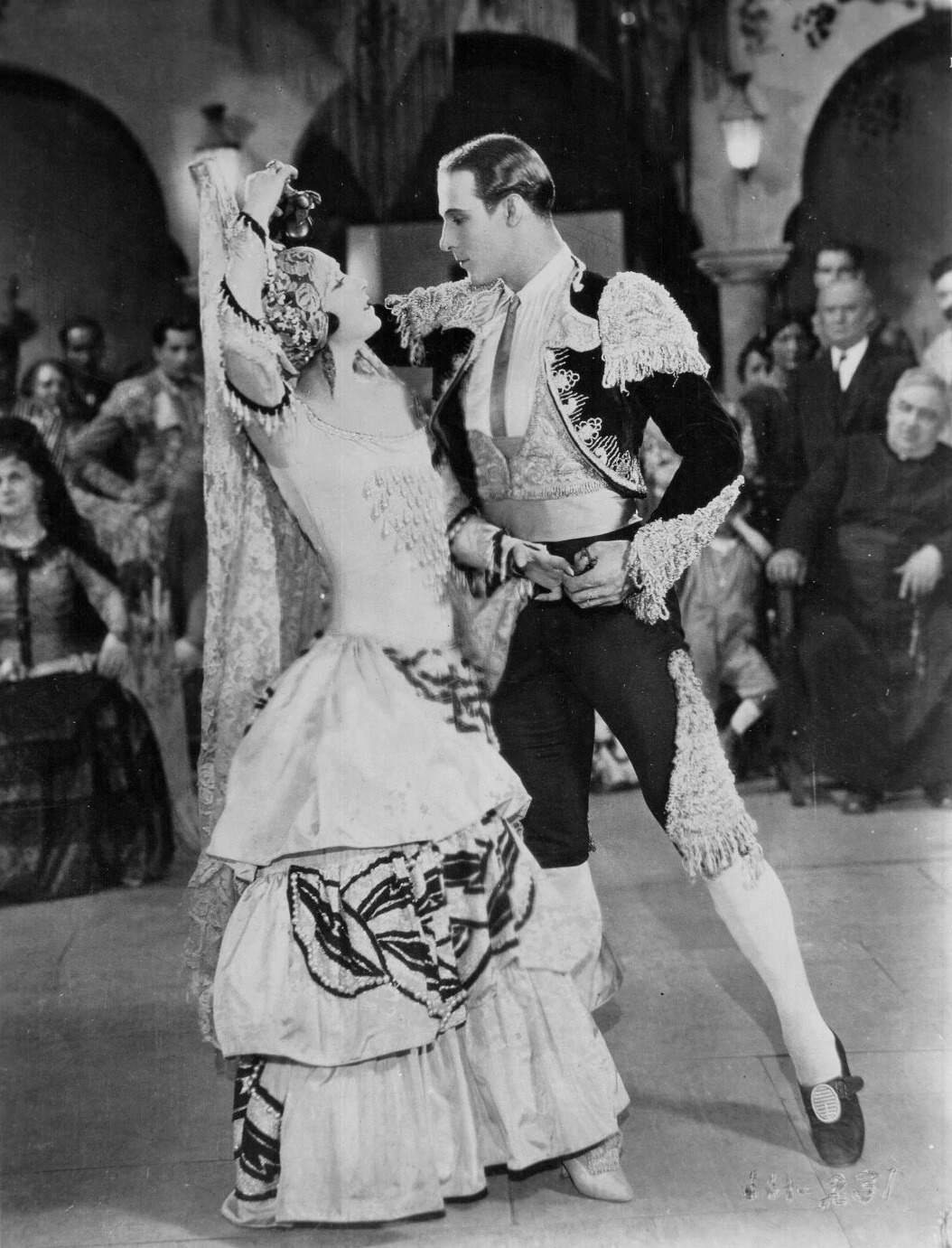
Film still of D'Algy and Rudolph Valentino in A Sainted Devil (1924)

Born in Portugal, Helena D'Algy spent her early childhood in Spain before her family relocated when she was still young. She and her brother, Tony D'Algy, caught the stage bug early and joined a stock company in Buenos Aires, where she became a popular actress on both stage and screen.

D'Algy was a prima donna who had previously performed with the Opéra-Comique in Paris before appearing as one of the principal singers with the Spanish Grand Opera Company on tour in Buenos Aires and Montevideo. She was said to possess a lovely soprano voice.

D'Algy arrived in New York in May 1923 and initially faced a series of setbacks until she caught the attention of Florenz Ziegfeld. Struck by her presence, Ziegfeld immediately signed her, and she appeared for a full season in his celebrated Follies. That experience proved invaluable when she returned to motion pictures: she was cast in a key role in Lend Me Your Husband, followed by notable performances in The Fool and Let No Man Put Asunder. She then appeared in Paramount's The Side Show of Life.

At Paramount, D'Algy was regarded as a major "find." Critics praised her for screening "like a million dollars" while also possessing genuine dramatic ability. Though she had the look of a Spanish heroine, she was not limited to a single "type", any more than contemporaries such as Bebe Daniels or Nita Naldi. Her most famous role was opposite matinée idol Rudolph Valentino in A Sainted Devil, which also featured her brother in a supporting role.

She appeared in several films between 1925 and 1926. Her career began to falter following the introduction of sound, and she returned to Broadway with The Sex Fable (1931).

D'Algy later starred in the Spanish-language box office hit Suburban Melody (1933), her last known film role. In 1991, she appeared in the Spanish TV series Imágenes perdidas.

D'Algy died in 1992.

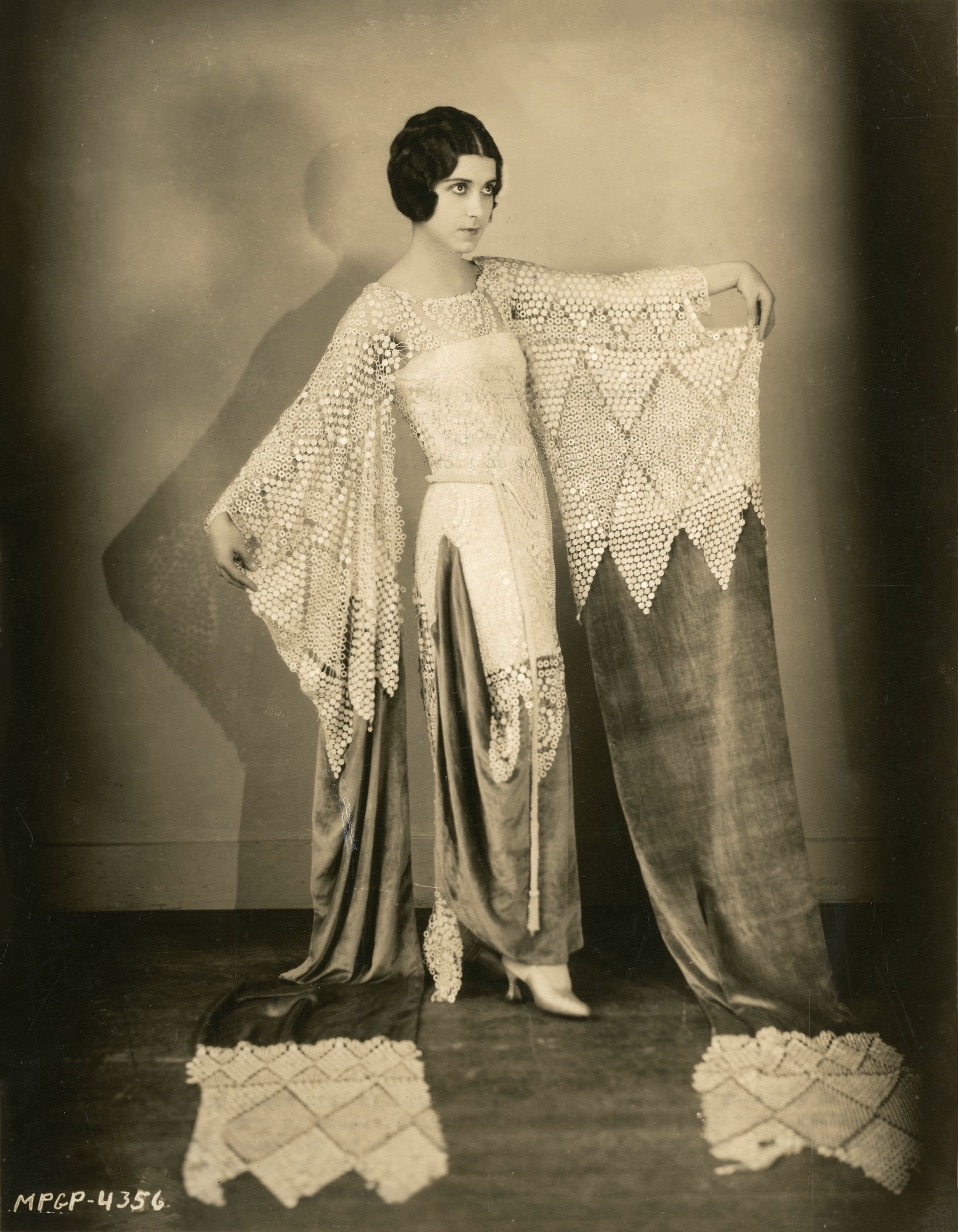
D'Algy circa 1925

== Selected filmography ==
- Lend Me Your Husband (1924)
- Let Not Man Put Asunder (1924)
- It Is the Law (1924)
- A Sainted Devil (1924)
- Pretty Ladies (1925)
- Daddy's Gone A-Hunting (1925)
- Confessions of a Queen (1925)
- Siberia (1926)
- Don Juan (1926)
- The Cowboy and the Countess (1926)
- The Exquisite Sinner (1926)
- The Silver Treasure (1926)
- A Race of Noblemen (1927)
- Let's Get Married (1931)
- Between Night and Day (1932)
- Suburban Melody (1933)

== Bibliography ==
- Finkielman, Jorge (2004). The Film Industry in Argentina: An Illustrated Cultural History. Jefferson, North Carolina: McFarland ISBN 0-7864-1628-9
