= Moonlight and Honeysuckle =

1921 film

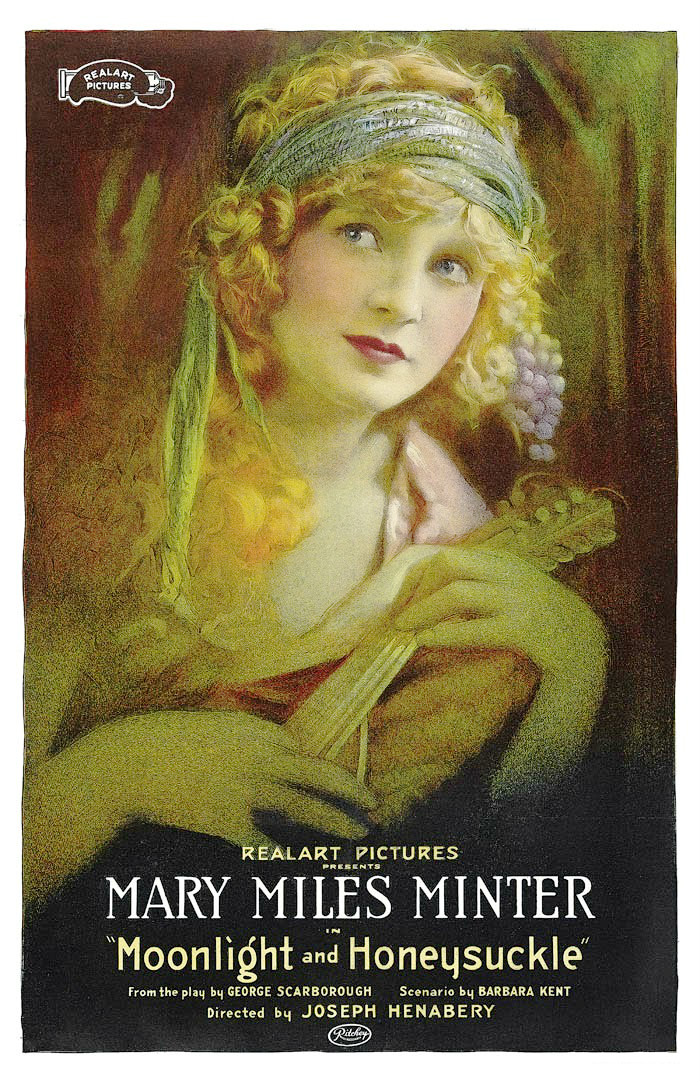
- lobby poster
- Directed by: Joseph Henabery
- Written by: Barbara Kent (scenario)
- Based on: Moonlight and Honeysuckle by George Scarborough
- Starring: Mary Miles Minter; Monte Blue
- Cinematography: Faxon M. Dean
- Production company: Realart Pictures Corporation
- Distributed by: Realart Pictures Corporation
- Release date: July 1921
- Running time: 5 reels
- Country: United States
- Language: Silent (English intertitles)

Moonlight and Honeysuckle is a 1921 American silent romantic comedy film directed by Joseph Henabery and starring Mary Miles Minter and Monte Blue. It was adapted by Barbara Kent from the 1919 stage play of the same name by George Scarborough. As with many of Minter's features, it is thought to be a lost film.

== Plot ==
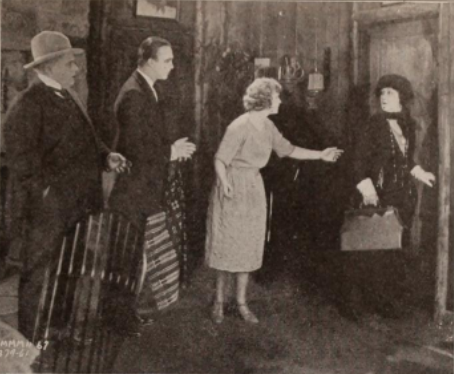
Scene from "Moonlight and Honeysuckle" (1921) starring Mary Miles Minter

As described in various film magazine reviews, Judith Baldwin lives on the Arizona ranch owned by her father. When her father is elected as senator and moves to Washington, Judith accompanies him, leaving behind ranch hand Tod Musgrove, who is in love with her.

In Washington Judith attracts the attention of two suitors; Congressman Hamill and Robert Courtney. Her father is keen for her to make a choice so that he can pursue his own relationship with the widowed Mrs. Langley, who refuses to marry him until Judith is out of the picture. Unsure which man to choose, Judith comes up with the idea of a "trial marriage" for each man at her aunt's woodland cabin, chaperoned by her old nurse.

Judith soon decides that Congressman Hamill is terribly boring and not the man for her. However, a servant at the lodge has recognised him and reported his presence to the newspapers, claiming that he has eloped with Judith. When the news appears in the papers, Hamill is forced to travel to the village to telephone through a denial; however, the published news has brought Courtney to the lodge ahead of his allotted time, as well as Tod Musgrove, who is determined to win Judith.

In the meantime, Senator Baldwin has secretly wed Mrs. Langley, and they arrive at the lodge anticipating a quiet honeymoon. Instead they find their daughter, her two Washington suitors, the assembled press, and Tod, who is threatening to shoot both men. Rejected by Judith and threatened by Tod, Hamill and Courtney depart swiftly, leaving Judith to decide upon Tod as the only husband for her.

== Cast ==
- Mary Miles Minter as Judith Baldwin
- Monte Blue as Tod Musgrove
- Willard Louis as Senator Baldwin
- Grace Goodall as Hallie Baldwin
- Guy Oliver as Congressman Hamill
- William Boyd as Robert V. Courtney
- Mabel Van Buren as Mrs. Langley
- Justine Johnstone in a bit part (Uncredited)
