= The Making of O'Malley =

1925 film

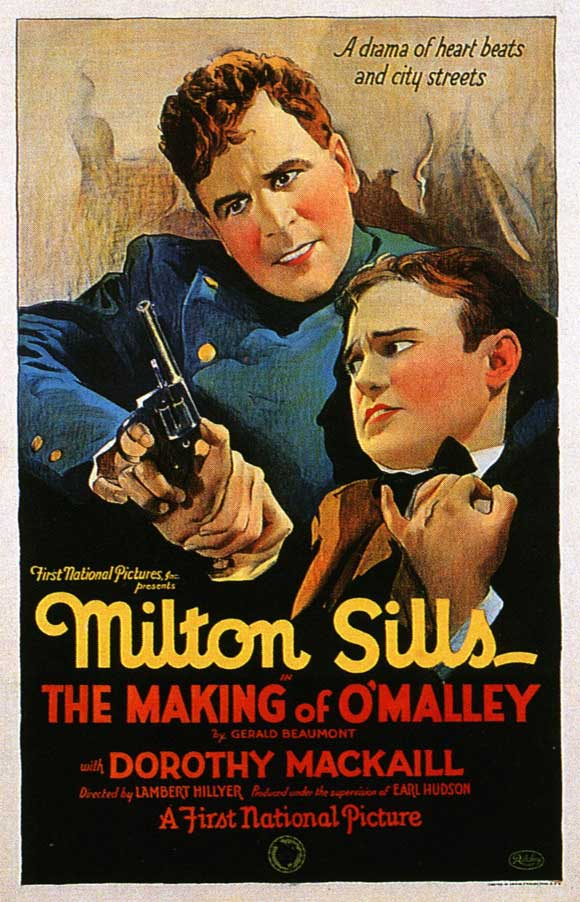
- Theatrical release poster
- Directed by: Lambert Hillyer
- Screenplay by: Eugene Clifford
- Based on: The Making of O'Malley; 1924 story in Red Book by Gerald Beaumont
- Starring: Milton Sills; Dorothy Mackaill; Helen Rowland; Warner Richmond; Thomas Carrigan; Julia Hurley
- Cinematography: Roy Carpenter
- Edited by: Arthur Tavares
- Production company: First National Pictures
- Distributed by: First National Pictures
- Release date: June 28, 1925
- Running time: 80 minutes
- Country: United States
- Language: Silent (English intertitles)

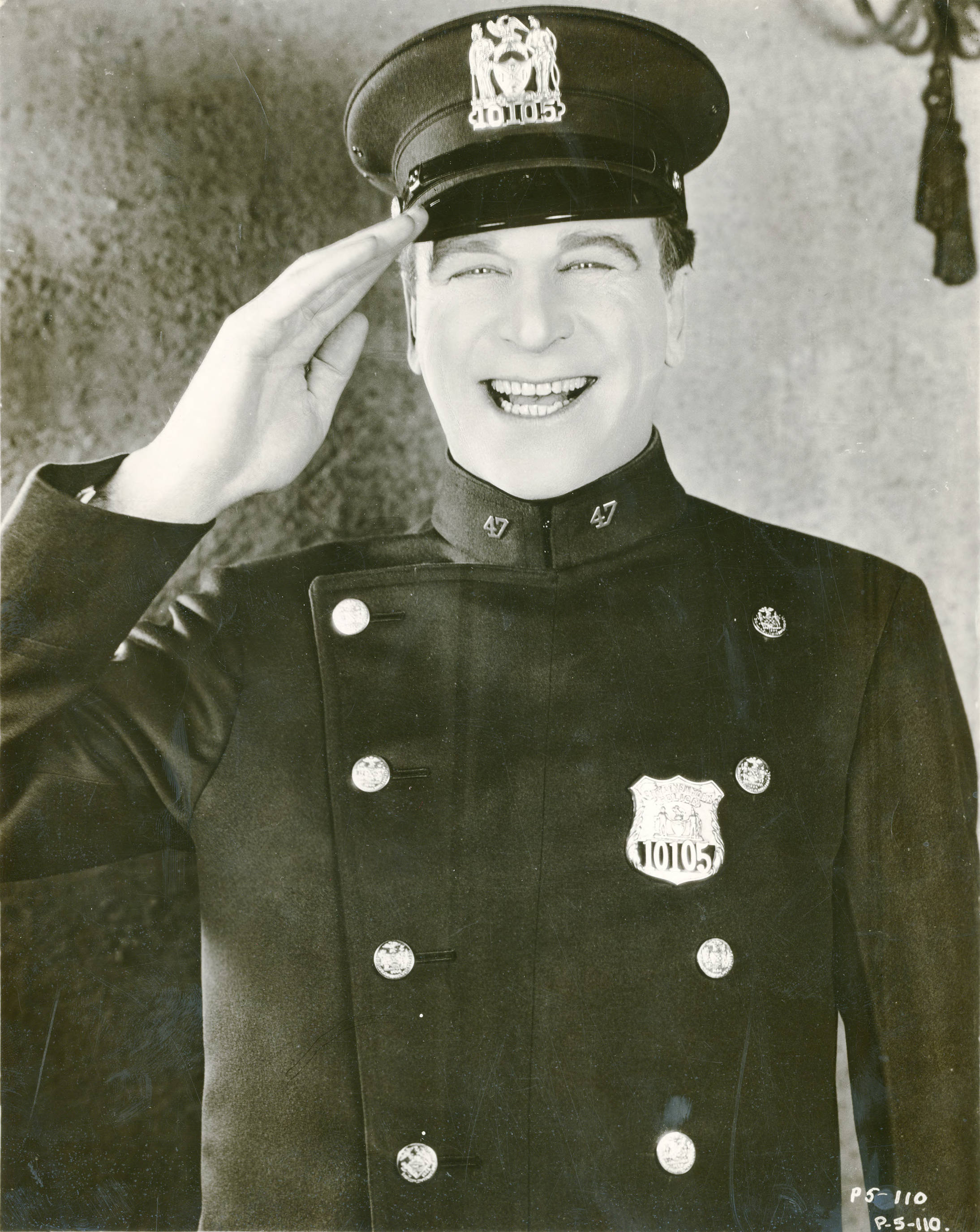
Milton Sills as O'Malley, 1925

The Making of O'Malley is a 1925 American silent drama film directed by Lambert Hillyer and written by Eugene Clifford. The film stars Milton Sills, Dorothy Mackaill, Helen Rowland, Warner Richmond, Thomas Carrigan and Julia Hurley. The film was released on June 28, 1925, by First National Pictures. The Gerald Beaumont short story was also the basis of the 1937 Warner Bros. film The Great O'Malley, directed by William Dieterle and starring Pat O'Brien and Humphrey Bogart.

== Plot ==
As described in a film magazine review, Lucille tires of her time as a young society woman and takes a position in the public schools. She requests aid in capturing a band of bootleggers. Policeman O'Malley is sent with orders to obey Lucille. O'Malley makes friends with Margie, a crippled child, whose father is in prison because O'Malley arrested him. O'Malley obtains a pardon for this man. Herbert Browne, the head of the bootleggers, is an admirer of Lucille. On the night of a masquerade ball held by Lucille, a raid is made on the band of bootleggers and Browne is found. He knocks O'Malley unconscious. When O'Malley reaches the ball, Browne is there. O'Malley arrests Browne while masking his face, but then releases him when he realizes he is Lucille's sweetheart. As O'Malley leaves the house, he is shot by Danny, whom he had received a pardon for. Danny divulges the name of Browne to the police captain. Realizing the magnamity of O'Malley, Lucille turns to him as the film ends.

== Cast ==
- Milton Sills as O'Malley
- Dorothy Mackaill as Lucille Thayer
- Helen Rowland as Margie
- Warner Richmond as Danny the Dude
- Thomas Carrigan as Herbert Browne
- Julia Hurley as Margie's Grandmother
- Claude King as Capt. Collins
- Allen Brander as Doctor
- Charles E. Graham as Sgt. Patterson
- John De Lacey as Clerk
- Blanche Craig as Dowager
- Thomas Wigney Percyval as Lawyer
- Charles Craig as Englishman
