= Gove (name) =

Gove is both a surname and a given name. The name is of Scottish origin and is derived from the Gaelic word for "smith" or "metalworker". Notable people with the name include:

== Surname ==
- Anna Maria Gove (1867–1948), American physician
- Cyril Gove (1890–1973), Australian Rules footballer
- David Gove (1978–2017), American ice hockey player
- DiAnne Gove (born 1951), American politician in New Jersey
- Jeff Gove (born 1971), American golfer
- Jennifer Gove (born 1940), South African cricketer
- Jesse Gove (1824–1862), soldier in the American Civil War
- Marguerite Gove (1877–1969), American suffragist
- Kirstin Gove (born 1973), Scottish TV presenter
- Michael Gove (born 1967), Scottish journalist, author, and retired politician
- Philip Babcock Gove (1902–1972), editor of Webster's dictionary
- Samuel F. Gove (1822–1900), U.S. Representative from Georgia

== Given name ==
- Gove Saulsbury (1815–1881), American politician
- Gove Scrivenor, American musician
