= Basil King =

Canadian clergyman (1859–1928)

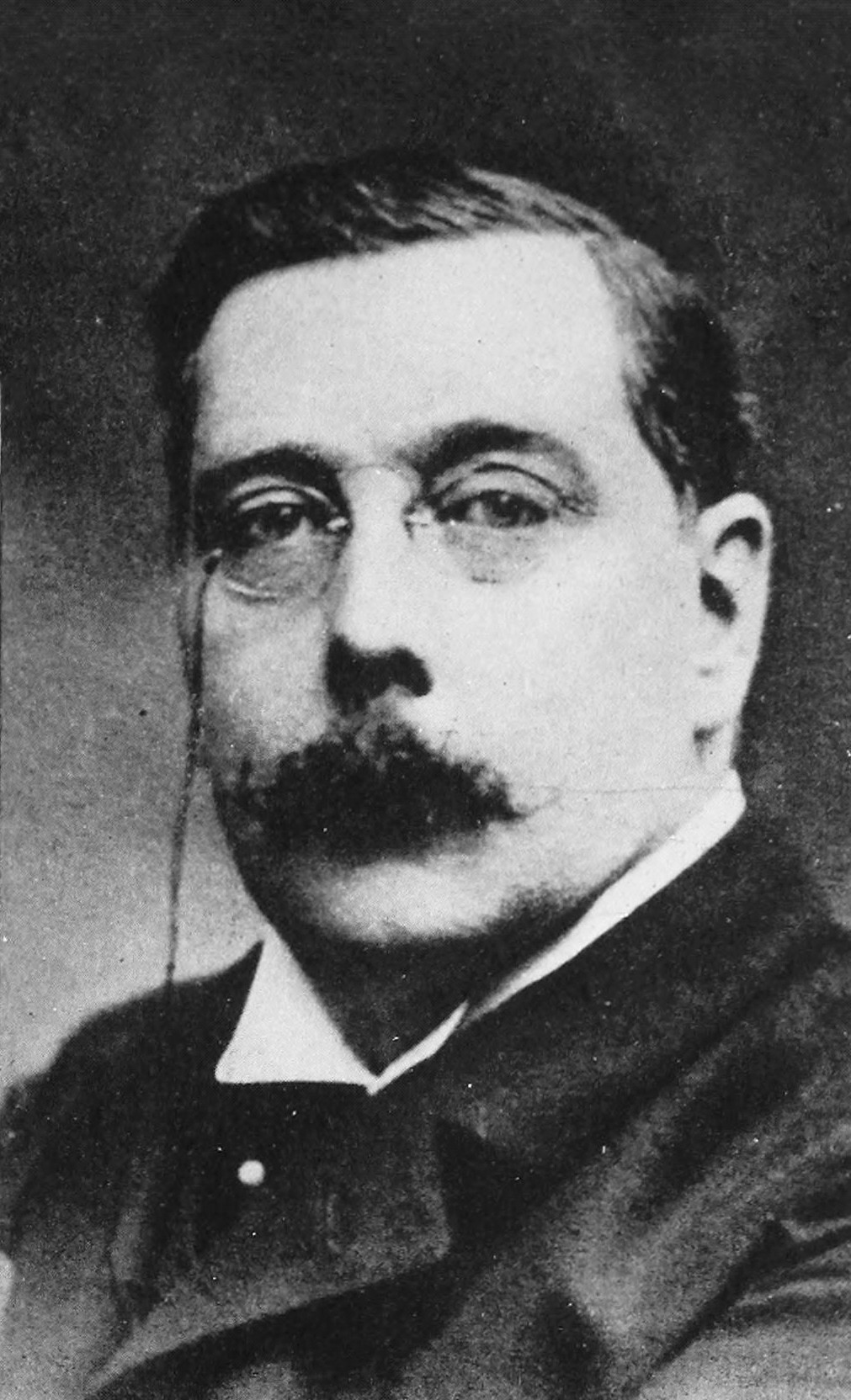
Basil King in a 1919 ad for a film

William Benjamin Basil King (1859 – 1928) was a Canadian clergyman who became a writer after retiring from the clergy. His novels and non-fiction were spiritually oriented.

== Life and career ==
He was born on February 26, 1859, in Charlottetown, Prince Edward Island. He was graduated from the University of King's College in Nova Scotia, and served as an Anglican rector at St. Luke's Pro-Cathedral in Halifax, Nova Scotia, and later at Christ Church in Cambridge, Massachusetts.

King began writing in 1900 after he was forced to retire from the clergy due to loss of eyesight and thyroid disease. His anonymously published novel The Inner Shrine, about a French Irish girl whose husband is killed in a duel, became very popular when published in 1909. King subsequently published a number of best-selling works.

King's spiritual orientation increased later in his life. His The Abolishing of Death (1919) described the transmission of messages from a deceased chemist. The Conquest of Fear (1921) portrayed his own struggle with ill health and eventual spiritual growth, and lays out his somewhat mystical approach to religious understanding. Critics often faulted King's fiction for its sentimentality and didacticism.

He died in Cambridge, Massachusetts on June 22, 1928.

== Quotes ==
"Go at it boldly, and you'll find unexpected forces closing round you and coming to your aid." sometimes cited as "Be bold and mighty forces will come to your aid."

== Selected works ==
- Griselda (1900)
- Let Not Man Put Asunder (1902)
- The Giant's Strength (1907)
- The Inner Shrine (1909)
- The Wild Olive (1910)
- The Street Called Straight (1912)
- The Way Home (1913)
- The Letter of the Contract (1914)
- The Side of the Angels (1916)
- The High Heart (1917)
- The Lifted Veil (1917)
- Abraham's Bosom (1918)
- The Abolishing of Death (1919)
- The City of Comrades (1919)
- Going West (1919)
- The Thread of Flame (1920)
- The Conquest of Fear (1921)
- The Dust Flower (1922)
- The Discovery of God (1923)
- The Happy Isles (1923)
- The Bible and Common Sense (1924)
- The Spreading Dawn: Stories of the Great Transition (1927). The collection contains six short stories:
  - The Spreading Dawn (first appeared as short story in Saturday Evening Post, 1916)
  - The Ghost's Story (first appeared as short story in The Red Book Magazine, 1918)
  - Heaven (first appeared as short story in Cosmopolitan, 1924)
  - Abraham's Bosom (first appeared as short story in Saturday Evening Post, 1918)
  - Going West (first appeared as short story in Pictorial Review, 1918)
  - The Last Enemy

== Filmography ==
- The Wild Olive, directed by Oscar Apfel (1915, based on the novel The Wild Olive)
- The Inner Shrine, directed by Frank Reicher (1917, based on the novel The Inner Shrine)
- The Lifted Veil, directed by George D. Baker (1917, based on the novel The Lifted Veil)
- The Spreading Dawn, directed by Laurence Trimble (1917, based on the short story The Spreading Dawn)
- The City of Comrades, directed by Harry Beaumont (1919, based on the novel The City of Comrades)
- The Street Called Straight, directed by Wallace Worsley (1920, based on the novel The Street Called Straight)
- Earthbound, directed by T. Hayes Hunter (1920, based on the short story The Ghost's Story)
- The Dust Flower, directed by Rowland V. Lee (1922, based on the novel The Dust Flower)
- Let Not Man Put Asunder, directed by J. Stuart Blackton (1924, based on the novel Let Not Man Put Asunder)
- Damaged Hearts, directed by T. Hayes Hunter (1924, based on a story by Basil King)
- Tides of Passion, directed by J. Stuart Blackton (1925, based on the novel In the Garden of Charity)
- Earthbound, directed by Irving Pichel (1940, based on the short story The Ghost's Story)
