= The Rejected Woman =

1924 film

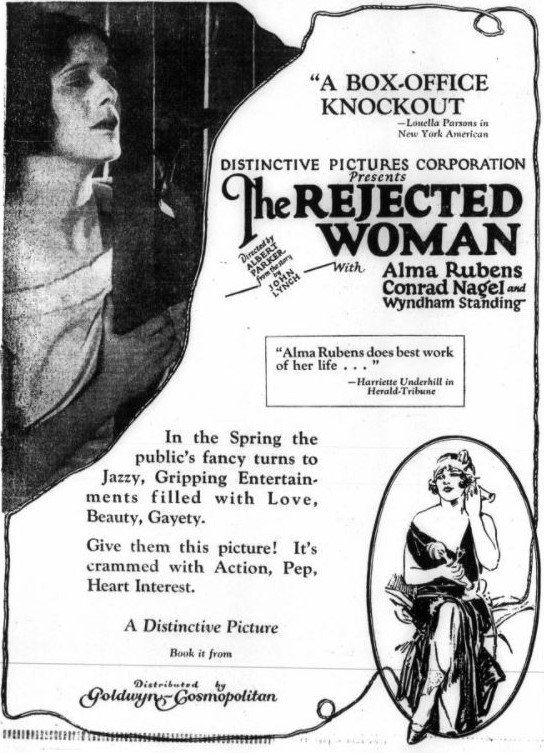
- Advertisement
- Directed by: Albert Parker
- Screenplay by: John Lynch
- Story by: John Lynch
- Starring: Alma Rubens; Conrad Nagel; Bela Lugosi
- Cinematography: J. Roy Hunt
- Production company: Distinctive Pictures
- Distributed by: Goldwyn-Cosmopolitan Distributing Corporation
- Release date: May 4, 1924
- Running time: 80 minutes
- Country: United States
- Language: Silent (English intertitles)

The Rejected Woman is a 1924 American silent drama film directed by Albert Parker (in New York) and written by John Lynch. The film stars Alma Rubens, Conrad Nagel, and Bela Lugosi in a supporting role as Jean Gagnon. It was produced by Distinctive Pictures and distributed by Goldwyn-Cosmopolitan Distributing Corporation. A print of The Rejected Woman is preserved at the George Eastman House.

== Plot ==
John Leslie (Nagel) is a rich New York City man who leads a brilliant life. While piloting his plane in Canada, he meets Diane Du Prez (Rubens) while seeking refuge from a storm. Shortly after John returns to New York City, Diane moves to town, and the two begin dating. Leslie's friends are scandalized by the relationship, as Diane is poor, shabbily dressed, and unsophisticated. Unbeknownst to John, his business manager James Dunbar (Wyndham Standing) offers Diane financial assistance so that she can buy the clothing and receive the proper training to fit in with John's upper-class friends. Diane's father Samuel (George MacQuarrie) attempts to dissuade Diane from accepting the offer, but she disregards her father's advice as she is convinced that John will never love her unless she becomes well dressed and sophisticated.

Shortly thereafter, John and Diane marry. After John learns of the arrangement Diane has made with his business manager, he becomes angry and the two quarrel. The couple eventually reconcile after realizing their love is greater than their differences.

== Cast ==
- Alma Rubens as Diane Du Prez
- Conrad Nagel as John Leslie
- Wyndham Standing as James Dunbar
- Bela Lugosi as Jean Gagnon, a continental
- George MacQuarrie as Samuel Du Prez
- Frederick Burton as Leyton Carter
- Antonio D'Algy as Craig Burnett
- C. Aubrey Smith as Peter Leslie
- Juliette La Violette as Aunt Rose
- Leonore Hughes as Lucille Van Tuyl (credited as Leonora Hughes)

== See also ==
- Béla Lugosi filmography
