= Annette Westbay =

American actress and playwright

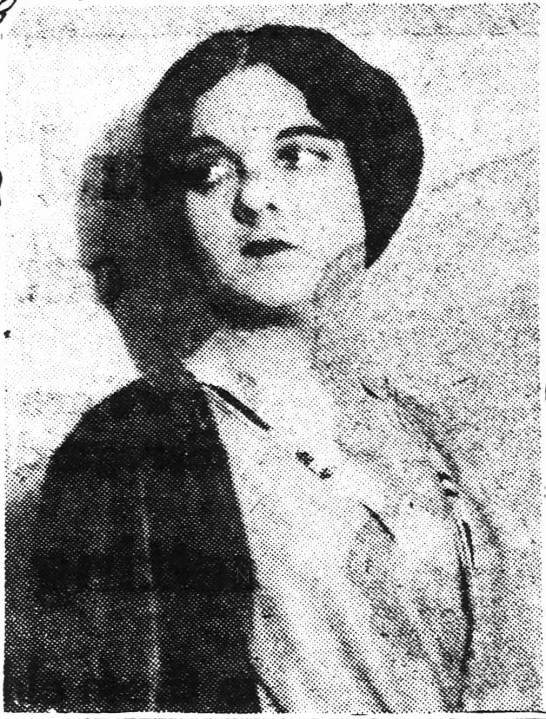
- Annette Westbay in a 1921 publicity photo for The Passion Flower
- Born: 1896; Warsaw, Poland
- Died: 1960 (aged 63–64)
- Occupations: Actress; playwright

Annette Westbay (1896–1960) was an American actress and playwright who was active in the early 20th-century. Born in Poland, she was adopted by an American couple and began to perform in theater productions in the 1910s. She wrote plays, sometimes in collaboration with her husband, George Scarborough.

== Early life ==
Westbay was born in Warsaw, Poland in 1896. Her mother was the Polish pianist Melanie Wienzkowska, and her father was a revolutionary. Her family were forced to flee the country due to political persecution. Shortly after they left Poland, Westbay's father died.

After her father's death, Westbay and her mother lived in the United States while her mother performed around the country. Westbay's mother later died, and she was then adopted by Henry E. Westbay, a New York dentist, and his wife.

== Career ==
By age 14, Westbay was considered talented at singing and piano playing, and had written for magazines, including Munsey's. She graduated from the American Academy of Dramatic Arts.

In 1916, she started acting in stage productions, playing the part of the maid in His Majesty Bunker Bean. In 1920, she acted the part of Acacia in an American production of the play The Passion Flower.

Around 1921, she married playwright George Scarborough. In 1922, Scarborough's play The Mad Dog was produced, and afterwards he had a "nervous breakdown". Due to his health, Westbay and Scarborough moved from the eastern United States to Nevada. They later settled in Las Vegas for at least a few years.

Westbay and Scarborough wrote Don Quixote, Jr., and in 1925, Metro-Goldwyn-Mayer bought the rights to the story. The work was adapted into the 1926 film, The Boob. Westbay and Scarborough wrote the play The Heaven Tappers, which premiered in 1926 at the San Francisco Columbia theatre. Westbay was cast in the play for a 1927 production at the Lyceum theatre. In March 1927, the play was produced on Broadway.

Westbay acted in other theatrical plays, including as Katchen in Forbidden, as The Princess in the first showing of Her Friend the King, as Tecla in Bad Babies, and in The Awful Truth.

Westbay died in 1960.

== Plays ==
- The Heaven Tappers, co-written by George Scarborough
- Madame Alias (c. 1927), co-written by Florence Hopkins
- The Girl I Loved, co-written by George Scarborough; adapted from poem by James Whitcomb Riley
- Cuckoo (1925), co-written by George Scarborough
