= Confessions of a Queen =

1925 film by Victor Sjöström

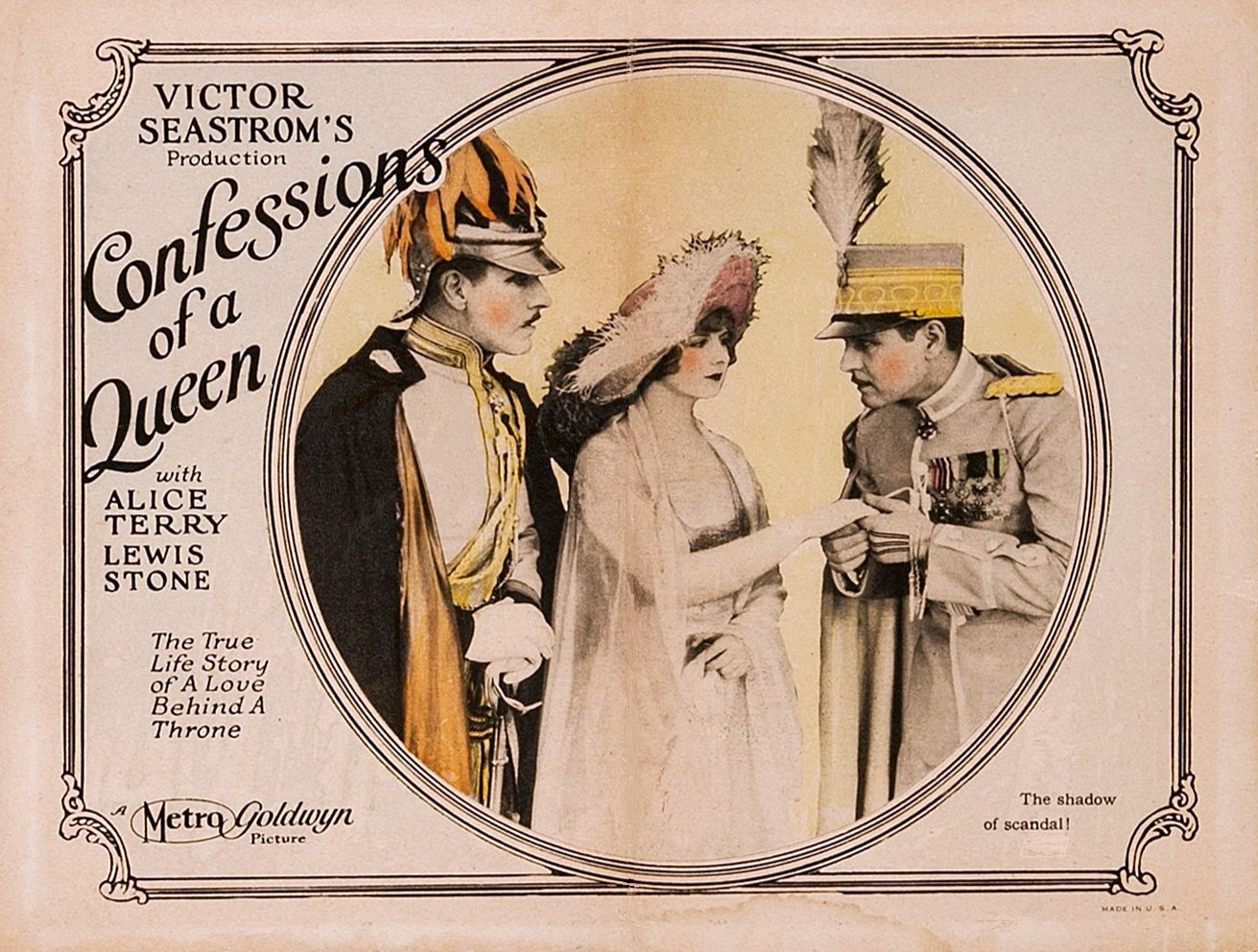
- Lobby card
- Directed by: Victor Sjöström
- Written by: Agnes Christine Johnston
- Based on: Les Rois en Exil by Alphonse Daudet
- Starring: Alice Terry; Lewis Stone; John Bowers
- Cinematography: Percy Hilburn (*French)
- Edited by: Hugh Wynn
- Production company: Metro-Goldwyn-Mayer
- Distributed by: Metro-Goldwyn Distributing Corporation
- Release date: March 30, 1925
- Running time: 64 minutes
- Country: United States
- Language: Silent (English intertitles)
- Budget: $148,000
- Box office: $440,000 (worldwide rentals)

Confessions of a Queen is a 1925 American silent drama film directed by Victor Sjöström based upon a novel by Alphonse Daudet, Les Rois en Exil. Only an incomplete print of the film survives.

The film's sets were designed by the art director James Basevi.

== Plot ==
The King of Illyris marries a neighboring princess, who finds out he has a mistress, Sephora. Revolted, she turns to Prince Alexei for friendship. Turmoil increases as a revolution demands the abdication of the King and the Queen opposes this decision.

== Cast ==
- Alice Terry as Frederika / Queen
- Lewis Stone as King
- John Bowers as Prince Alexei
- Eugénie Besserer as Eleanora
- Helena D'Algy as Sephora
- Frankie Darro as Prince Zara
- Joseph J. Dowling as Duke of Rosen (credited as Joseph Dowling)
- George Beranger as Lewin (credited as André de Beranger)
- Bert Sprotte as Revolutionary Leader
- Wilbur Higby as Revolutionary Officer
- Otto Hoffman as King's Valet
- Frances Hatton as Maid
- James McElhern as King's Parisian Valet
