= A Sainted Devil =

1924 film

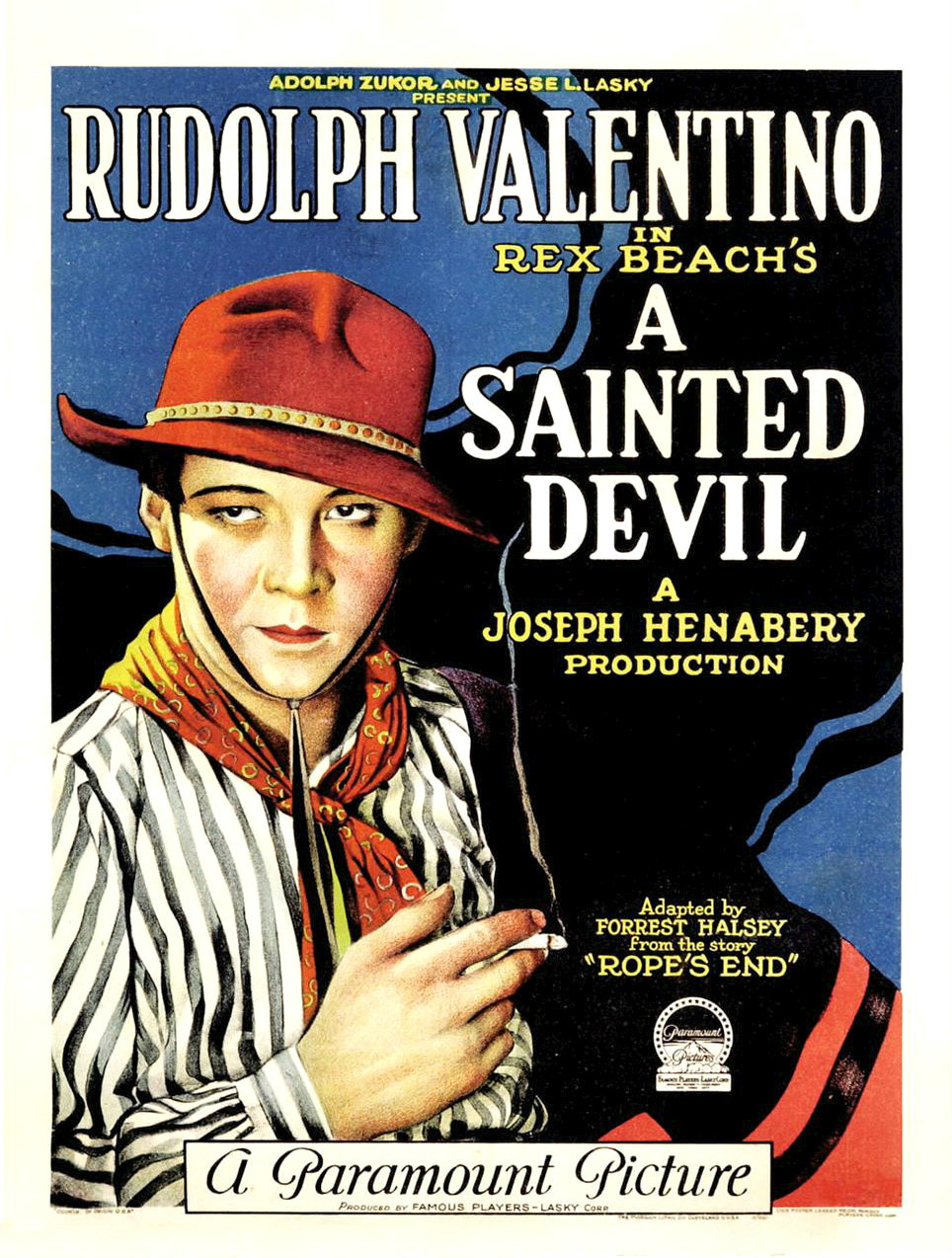
- Theatrical poster
- Directed by: Joseph Henabery
- Written by: Forrest Halsey (adaptation)
- Based on: "Rope's End" by Rex Beach
- Produced by: Jesse L. Lasky; Adolph Zukor
- Starring: Rudolph Valentino
- Cinematography: Harry Fischbeck
- Production company: Famous Players–Lasky
- Distributed by: Paramount Pictures
- Release date: November 17, 1924 (United States)
- Running time: 90 minutes
- Country: United States
- Language: Silent (English intertitles)

A Sainted Devil is a 1924 American silent romantic drama film directed by Joseph Henabery and starring Rudolph Valentino. Based on the novel Ropes End by Rex Beach, the film tells the story of a Latin American revolutionary who disguises himself as a priest while seeking revenge against a corrupt dictator. The film was produced by Adolph Zukor and Jesse Lasky. A Sainted Devil was the second film Valentino made under his new production arrangement following his highly publicized dispute with Famous Players–Lasky. The film received mixed critical reviews but performed strongly in its first week at the box office.

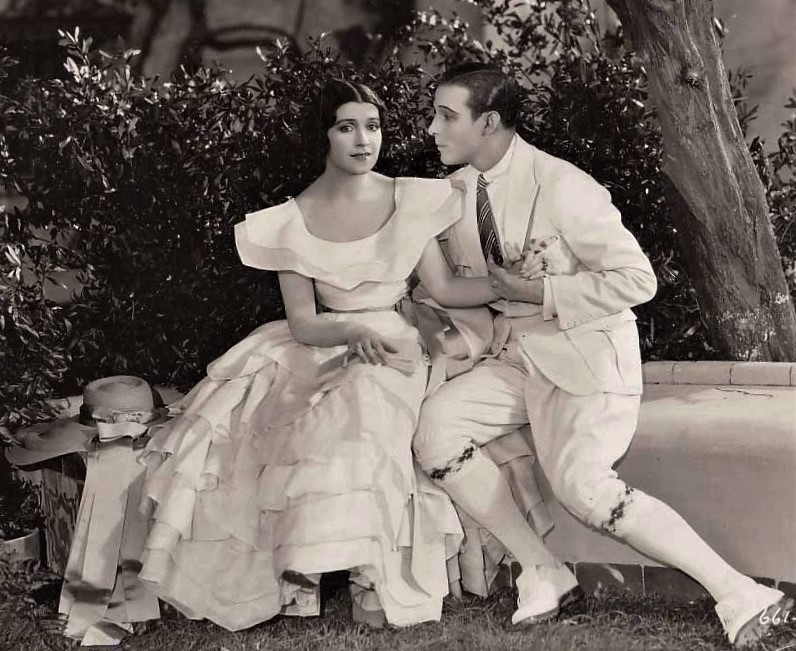
Film still of Helena D'Algy and Valentino

== Plot ==
As described in a review in a film magazine, in accordance with custom, Castro arranges the marriage of his son, Don Alonzo, with Julietta, the daughter of a proud Spanish family, and she comes to the South American state for the wedding. Carlotta, daughter of the major domo, is jealous and with her father arranges with a bandit, El Tigre, who loots the estate on the Don's wedding night and kidnaps Julietta. The Don goes to her rescue, but believes she is unfaithful when he sees El Tigre embracing Carlotta, who is wearing Julietta's mantilla. The Don becomes disgusted with women and seeks to become revenged on El Tigre. Julietta and Carmelita, a dancer, escape and Julietta goes to a convent. Finally the Don meets El Tigre and his friend, Don Luis, stabs him in a fight. Carmelita, who loves the Don, hides the truth, but eventually takes him to Carmelita and they begin life anew together.

== Cast ==
- Rudolph Valentino as Don Alonzo Castro
- Nita Naldi as Carlotta
- Helena D'Algy as Julietta (credited as Helen D'Algy)
- Dagmar Godowsky as Doña Florencia
- Jean Del Val as Casimiro
- Antonio D'Algy as Don Luis
- George Siegmann as El Tigre
- Rogers Lytton as Don Baltasar
- Isabel West as Doña Encarnación
- Louise Lagrange as Carmelita
- Rafael Bongini as Congo
- Frank Montgomery as Indian Spy
- William Betts as Priest
- Edward Elkas as Notary
- A. De Rosa as Jefe Politico
- Ann Brody as Duenna
- Evelyn Axzell as Guadulupe
- Marie Diller as Irala
- Genevieve Belasco as Minor Role (uncredited)

== Reception ==
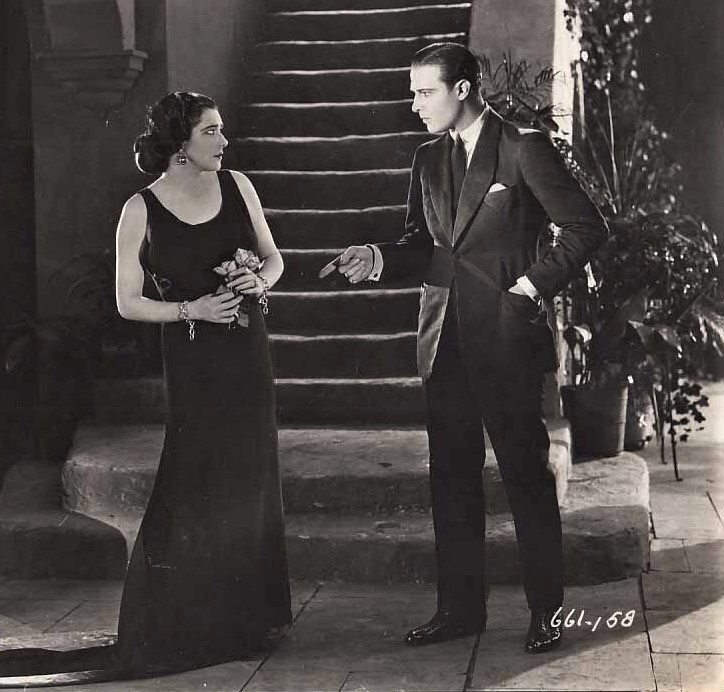
Film still of Nita Naldi and Valentino

=== Box office ===
When A Sainted Devil premiered, it initially drew strong business at the Strand Theatre in New York City, opening to $9,000 on the first day, which was about $1,000 better than Valentino's previous film Monsieur Beaucaire got on its first day of engagement. The film reportedly attracted audiences ranging "from flappers to grandmothers." Attendance, however, declined quickly, and the planned three-week engagement was shortened to a two-week run.

At the Loew's State Theatre in Boston, it grossed $16,000 in its first week, considered exceptional business for that time of year. It earned $11,000 in its opening week at the Stanley Theatre in Pittsburgh, the theater's best performance in some time, and $15,000 in its first week at the Columbia Theatre in Washington, D.C. Although it did not surpass the receipts of Monsieur Beaucaire at the Loew's Century Theatre in Baltimore, it nonetheless posted a strong opening there with $16,000.

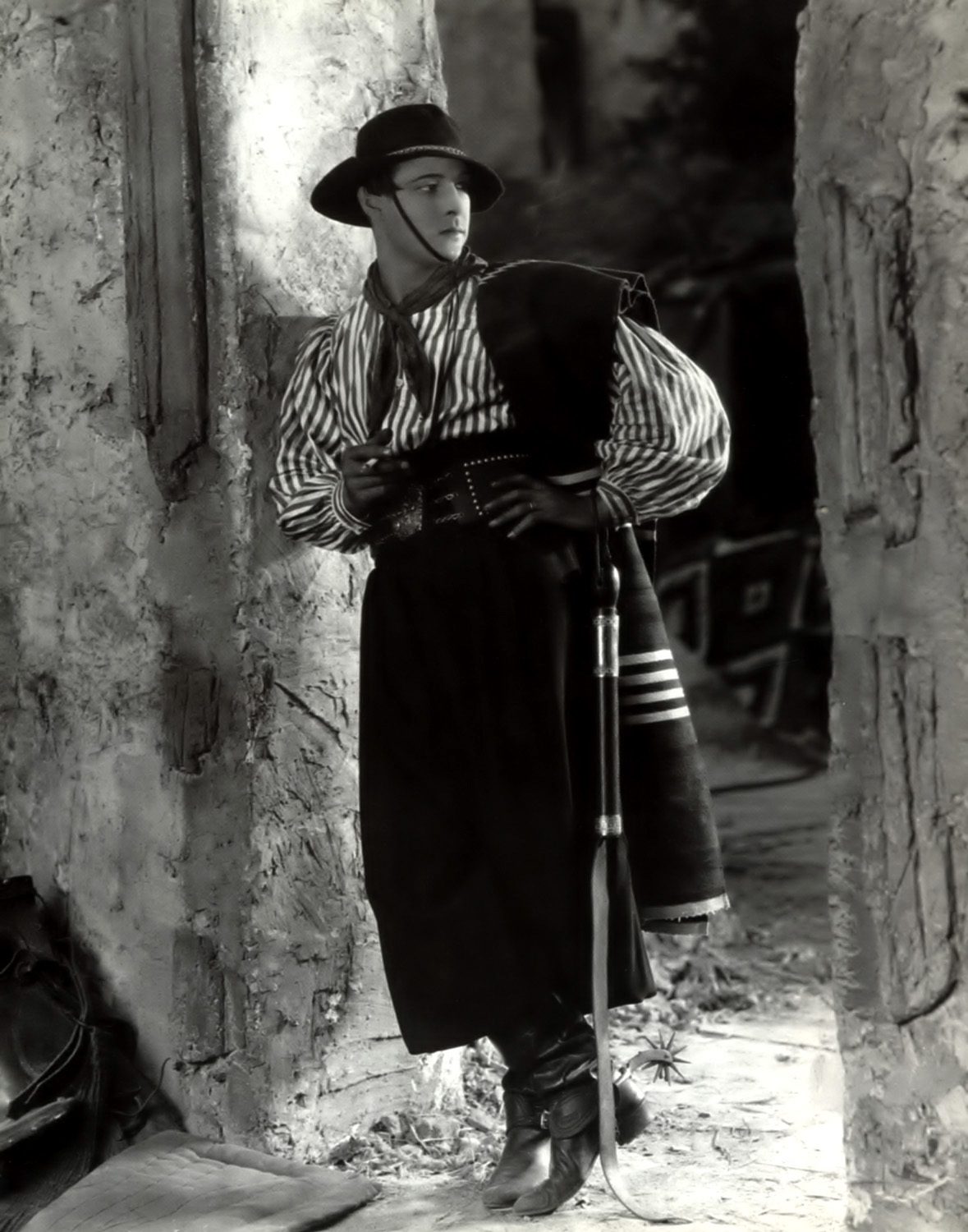
Publicity still of Valentino as Don Alonzo

=== Reviews ===
In a review for The New York Times, Mordaunt Hall wrote that A Sainted Devil "is enhanced by the glamour of picturesque and glistening costumes. The narrative is told with certain deliberation, the same tempo being sustained for its full length. There are times, however, when subtitles cover action which it would have been better to include as scenes. Then in several instances one does not receive a clear idea of the passage of time, and here and there one perceives scenes which are introduced with tranquil poses. ... Mr. Valentino is, however, a far better actor in this film than in 'Monsieur Beaucaire.' The atmosphere evidently suits him. Toward the end of the film he flings aside all thoughts of good looks and soft smiles, and gives a splendid portrayal of a man seeing red. His rage in this sequence is most impressive, as it comes as a marked contrast to his calm bearing throughout most of the other stretches."

A Sainted Devil was not very well received by Photoplay, saying the film "lacks force, as well as the charm of Monsieur Beaucaire. There are several reasons. Rex Beach's romance has been clumsily told and Rudy himself isn't real in his stressed emotional moments," concluding with "the story gets involved in inessentials and misses anything like a big sensation."

== Preservation ==
With no prints of A Sainted Devil located in any film archives, it is a lost film.

== See also ==
- List of lost films
