= The Wild Olive =

1915 film by Oscar Apfel

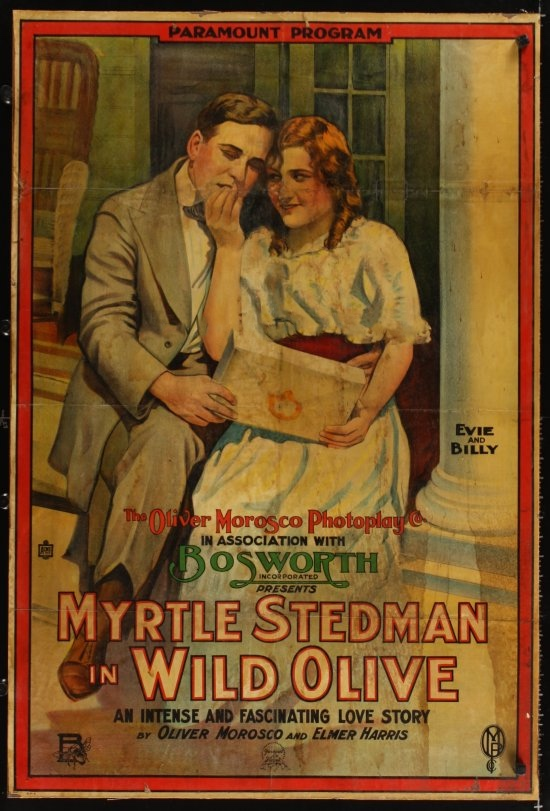
- lobby poster
- Directed by: Oscar Apfel
- Screenplay by: Elmer Blaney Harris; Oliver Morosco
- Based on: the novel The Wild Olive by Basil King
- Produced by: Hobart Bosworth
- Starring: Myrtle Stedman; Forrest Stanley; Mary Ruby; Charles Marriott; Edmund Lowe; Herbert Standing
- Cinematography: James Van Trees
- Production companies: Hobart Bosworth Productions; Oliver Morosco Photoplay Company
- Distributed by: Paramount Pictures
- Release date: June 24, 1915
- Running time: 5 reels
- Country: United States
- Language: Silent..English titles

The Wild Olive is a lost 1915 American drama silent film directed by Oscar Apfel and written by Elmer Blaney Harris, Basil King and Oliver Morosco. The film stars Myrtle Stedman, Forrest Stanley, Mary Ruby, Charles Marriott, Edmund Lowe and Herbert Standing. The film was released on June 24, 1915, by Paramount Pictures.

== Plot ==
Nicknamed "Wild Olive," Miriam Strange discovers that her mom was an Indian, she moves to a hovel close to an Allegheny stumble camp. Norrie Passage, straight from school, visits his uncle, the tormenting manager of the camp, and meets Miriam. After his uncle is killed with a blade discovered covered up under Norrie's bedding, Norrie is condemned to pass on. In spite of the fact that he pledged to wed her, after his letters to "Wild Olive" return undelivered, Norrie, wearing a facial hair growth and an accepted name, gets connected with to Evie Wayne, Miriam's stepsister. At the point when Norrie is shipped off be his association's New York director, he meets Miriam once more. She forfeits her adoration and consents to wed attorney Charles Victory, in the event that he will demonstrate Norrie's blamelessness. After Evie finds out about Norrie's past and breaks the commitment, the killer makes a deathbed admission. Conquest discharges Miriam when he sees that she adores Norrie.

== Cast ==
- Myrtle Stedman as Miriam Strange, 'The Wild Olive'
- Forrest Stanley as Norrie Ford
- Mary Ruby as Evie Wayne
- Charles Marriott as Judge Wayne
- Edmund Lowe as Charles Conquest
- Herbert Standing as South American businessman
