= Let Not Man Put Asunder =

1924 film

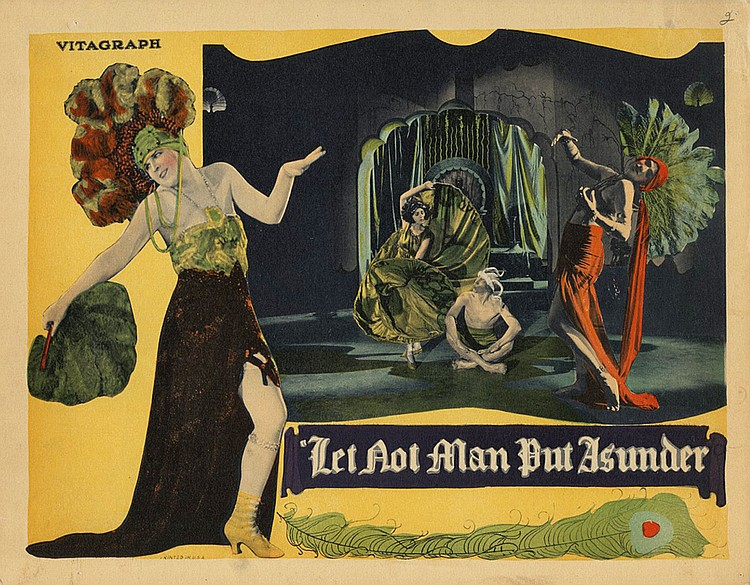
- Directed by: J. Stuart Blackton
- Written by: Charles Gaskill (scenario)
- Based on: Let Not Man Put Asunder by Basil King
- Produced by: J. Stuart Blackton
- Starring: Pauline Frederick; Lou Tellegen
- Production company: Vitagraph Company of America
- Distributed by: Vitagraph Company of America
- Release date: February 1924
- Running time: 55 minutes
- Country: United States
- Language: Silent (English intertitles)

Let Not Man Put Asunder is a 1924 American silent drama film starring Pauline Frederick, produced and directed by J. Stuart Blackton, and distributed by Vitagraph, a company Blackton co-founded. The story is based on a 1902 novel of the same name by Basil King about divorce.

Similarly, Let No Man Put Asunder, titled film was made in 1913 by the Essanay Company starring Francis X. Bushman and Beverly Bayne.

== Cast ==
- Pauline Frederick as Petrina Faneuil
- Lou Tellegen as Dick Lechmere
- Leslie Austin as Harry Vassall
- Helena D'Algy as Felicia De Proney
- Pauline Neff as Lady De Bohun
- Barbara Leonard as Polly De Bohun
- Maurice Costello as Sir Humphrey
- Martha Petelle as Mrs. Vassall
- Gladys Frazin as Gentian Tyrell
- Homer Lynn as Chaillot
- Clifton Webb as Major Bertie (uncredited)

Costars Tellegen and Frazin both committed unrelated suicides after their respective serial divorces and career declines.

== Preservation ==
With no prints of Let Not Man Put Asunder found in any film archive, it is a lost film.
