= Lend Me Your Husband (1924 film) =

1924 film

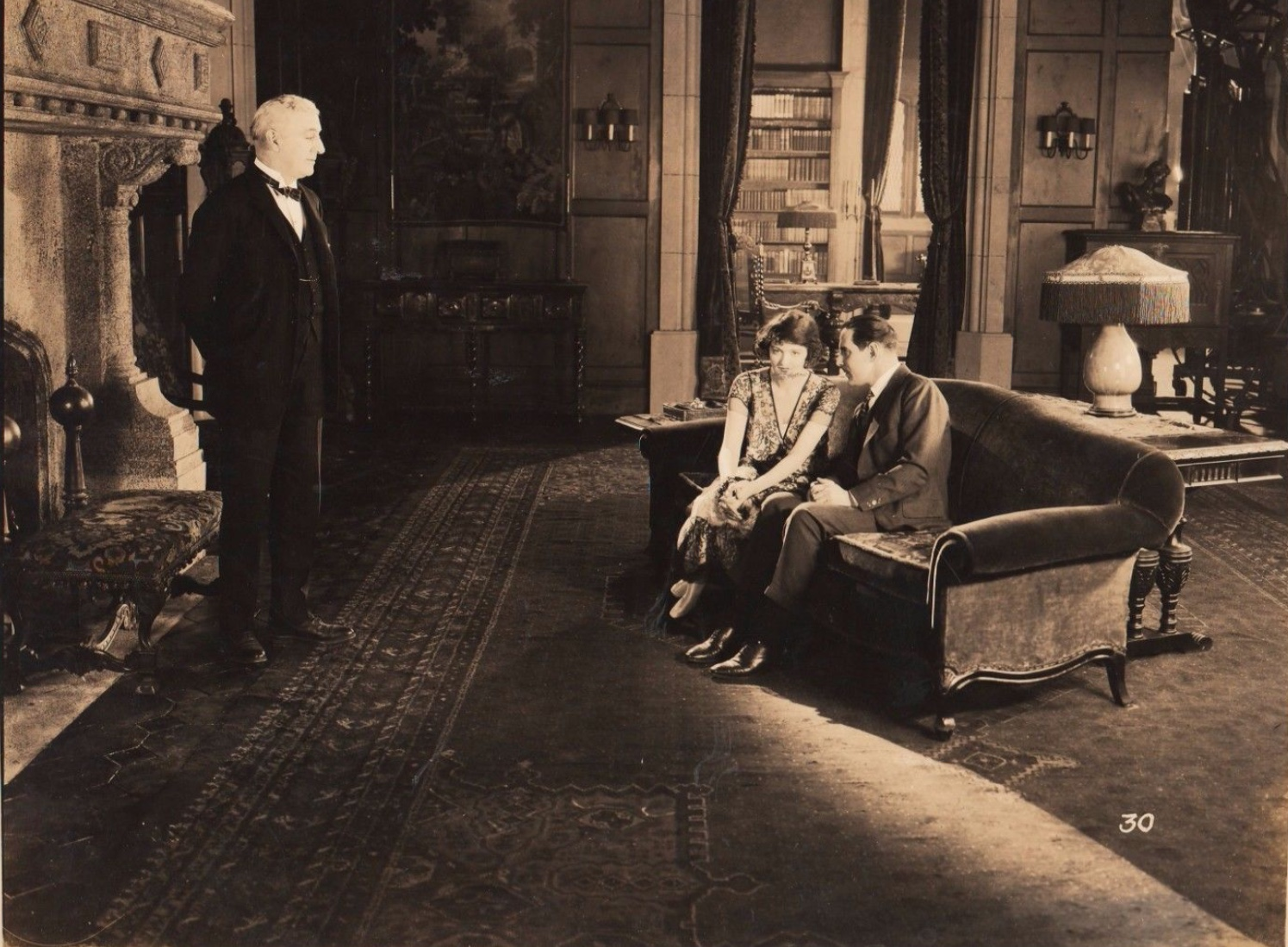
- Directed by: Christy Cabanne
- Written by: Marguerite Gove; Ray Harris
- Produced by: C.C. Burr
- Starring: Doris Kenyon; David Powell; Dolores Cassinelli
- Cinematography: John W. Brown; Neil Sullivan
- Production company: C.C. Burr Productions
- Distributed by: Associated Exhibitors
- Release date: June 15, 1924
- Running time: 60 minutes
- Country: United States
- Language: Silent (English intertitles)

Lend Me Your Husband is a 1924 American silent drama film directed by Christy Cabanne and starring Doris Kenyon, David Powell, and Dolores Cassinelli.

== Synopsis ==
A fast living society girl is engaged to be married, but becomes involved with a married man with a bad reputation. Unknown to her, he is also having an affair with her friend.

== Cast ==
- Doris Kenyon as Aline Stackton
- David Powell as Henry Seton
- Dolores Cassinelli as Mrs. Seton
- J. Barney Sherry as Burrows Stackton
- Violet Mersereau as Jenny MacDonald
- Burr McIntosh as Fergus MacDonald
- Cornelius Keefe as Robert Towers
- Coit Albertson as Count Ferrari
- Helena D'Algy as Countess Ferrari

== Bibliography ==
- Munden, Kenneth White. The American Film Institute Catalog of Motion Pictures Produced in the United States, Part 1. University of California Press, 1997.
