= It Happened in Seville =

- Directed by: José Gutiérrez Maesso
- Written by: Antonio Abad Ojuel; José Gutiérrez Maesso; Leonardo Martín; Alejandro Pérez Lugín; Enrique Songel; Manuel Suárez Caso; José Andrés Vázquez (novel)
- Starring: Juanita Reina; Rubén Rojo; Alfredo Mayo
- Cinematography: Emilio Foriscot
- Edited by: Julio Peña
- Music by: Juan Ruiz de Azagra
- Production company: Altamira Ind. Cinematográfica
- Distributed by: CIFESA
- Release date: 17 January 1955
- Running time: 84 minutes
- Country: Spain
- Language: Spanish

It Happened in Seville (Spanish: Sucedió en Sevilla) is a 1955 Spanish musical film directed by José Gutiérrez Maesso and starring Juanita Reina, Rubén Rojo and Alfredo Mayo. It is a remake of the 1942 film The White Dove in which Reina had also starred. It was remade again in 1966 as Road to Rocío with Carmen Sevilla as the lead.

The film's sets were designed by Enrique Alarcón.

== Cast ==
- Juanita Reina as Esperanza
- Rubén Rojo as Juan Antonio
- Alfredo Mayo as Alberto Campos
- Maria Piazzai as María Jesús
- Julia Caba Alba as Sirvienta
- José Calvo as Mayoral Manuel
- Concha Colado
- María Fernanda D'Ocón
- José Marco Davó as Fernando Aguilar
- Manuel Fuentes
- Cándida Losada as Cristina
- María Vicenta Martín
- Juanjo Menéndez as Morton
- Mario Moreno as Ricardo Parra 'Ceci'
- Elisa Méndez as Doña Martina
- Amelia Ortas
- Luis Pavón
- Manuel Portela
- Prudencio Rivas
- Luisa Sala
- Carmen Sanz
- Josefina Serratosa
- Laura Valenzuela as Alberto's flirt

== Bibliography ==
- Juan Francisco Cerón Gómez. El cine de Juan Antonio Bardem. EDITUM, 1998.
