= The Dust Flower =

- Advertisement for the film
- Directed by: Rowland V. Lee
- Screenplay by: Charles Kenyon
- Story by: Basil King
- Based on: The Dust Flower by Basil King
- Starring: Helene Chadwick; James Rennie; Claude Gillingwater
- Cinematography: Max Fabian
- Production company: Goldwyn Pictures
- Release date: July 2, 1922
- Running time: 6 reels
- Country: United States
- Language: Silent (English intertitles)

The Dust Flower is a 1922 drama film directed by Rowland V. Lee. It is based on the novel of the same name by Basil King.

== Plot ==
Letty Gravely attempts to end her miserable existence by plunging into a lake and is saved by Rashley Allerton, a millionaire. He has just been turned down by his sweetheart and has threatened to marry the first girl he meets. Letty accepts his marriage offer more as a protection than anything else. Arriving at the palatial Allerton home, Rashley finds a repentant note from his former fiancee. He visits her and tells her of the sudden marriage to another. Barbara, the fiancee, demands that he dismiss the girl. His wife, however, feeling that Rashley would be happier with Barbara, runs away. Rashley traces her to a slum cabaret where her stepfather has forced her to work as a cigarette girl. A terrific fistic encounter between the stepfather and Rashley ensues. Rashley wins. He takes his wife home where he learns that it was Barbara’s scheming that turned his bride from him. He sends Barbara away forever.

== Cast ==
- Helene Chadwick as Letty Gravely
- James Rennie as Ashleigh Allerton
- Claude Gillingwater as Steptoe
- Mona Kingsley as Barbara Holbrook
- Edward Peil Sr. as Judson Flack
- George Periolat as Ott

== Reception ==
A contemporary newspaper review praised Chadwick's performance. A review in The Macon Telegraph also praised Chadwick's performance, along with the rest of the cast.
