= Juanita Reina =

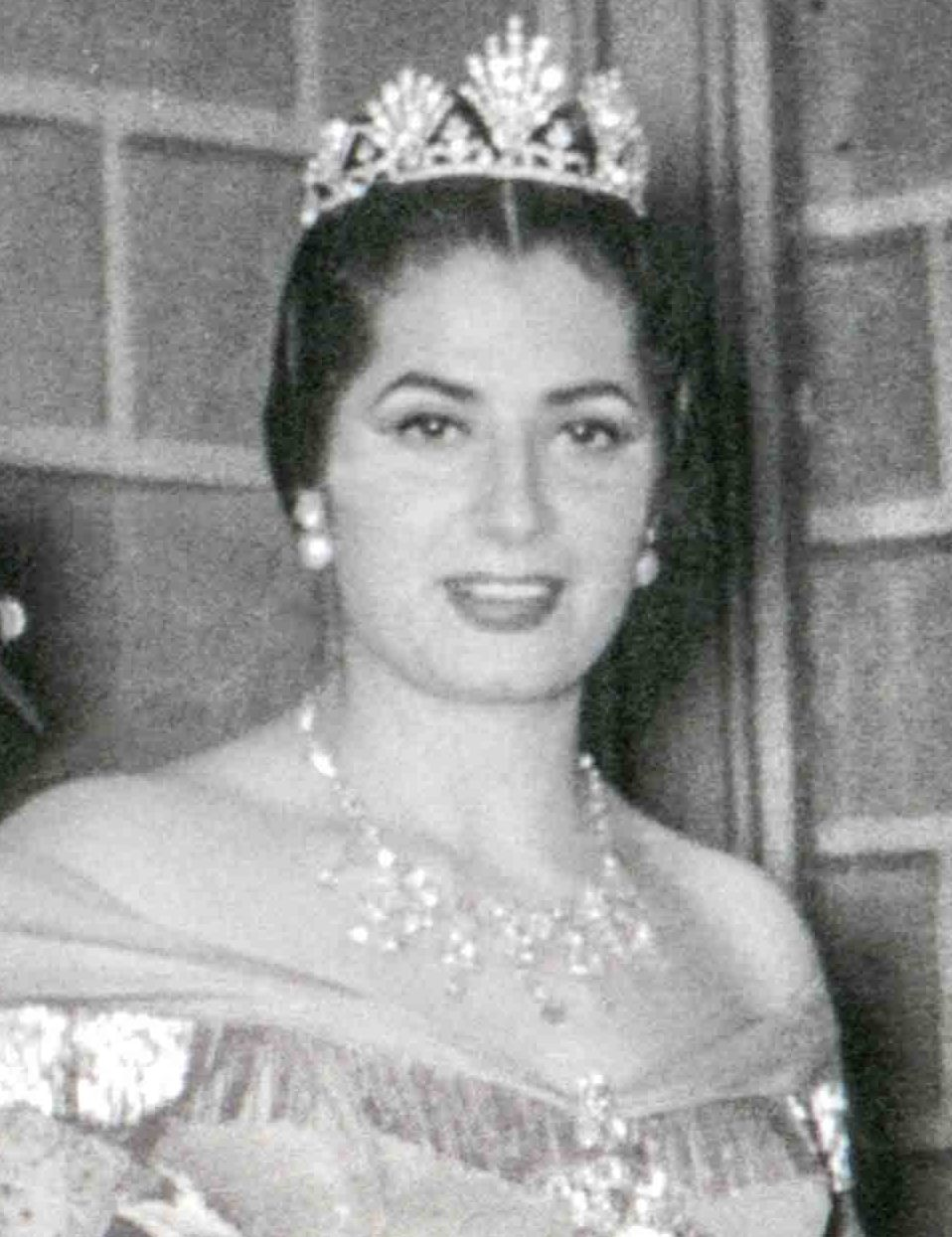
- Juanita Reina in 1955

Background information
- Also known as: La Reina de la Copla
- Born: Juana Reina Castrillo; 25 August 1925; Seville, Spain
- Died: 19 March 1999 (aged 73) Seville, Spain
- Genres: Copla
- Occupations: Singer, actress
- Instrument: Vocals
- Years active: 1941–1960s

Juana Reina Castrillo (25 August 1925 in Seville – 19 March 1999 in Seville) better known as Juanita Reina, was a Spanish actress and copla singer.

She was born in the Sevillian district, la Macarena, Seville and studied in Enrique el Cojo's academy.

She became popular thanks to songs by famous copla songwriters like León or Quiroga and she debuted in movies with La blanca Paloma (White Pigeon) (1941).

On 15 June 1964 she married the flamenco dancer Federico Casado Algrenti, and she later inaugurated a restaurant in Madrid and a dancing academy in Seville.

She died from a respiratory insufficiency and she is buried in the cemetery San Fernando in Seville.

== Filmography ==
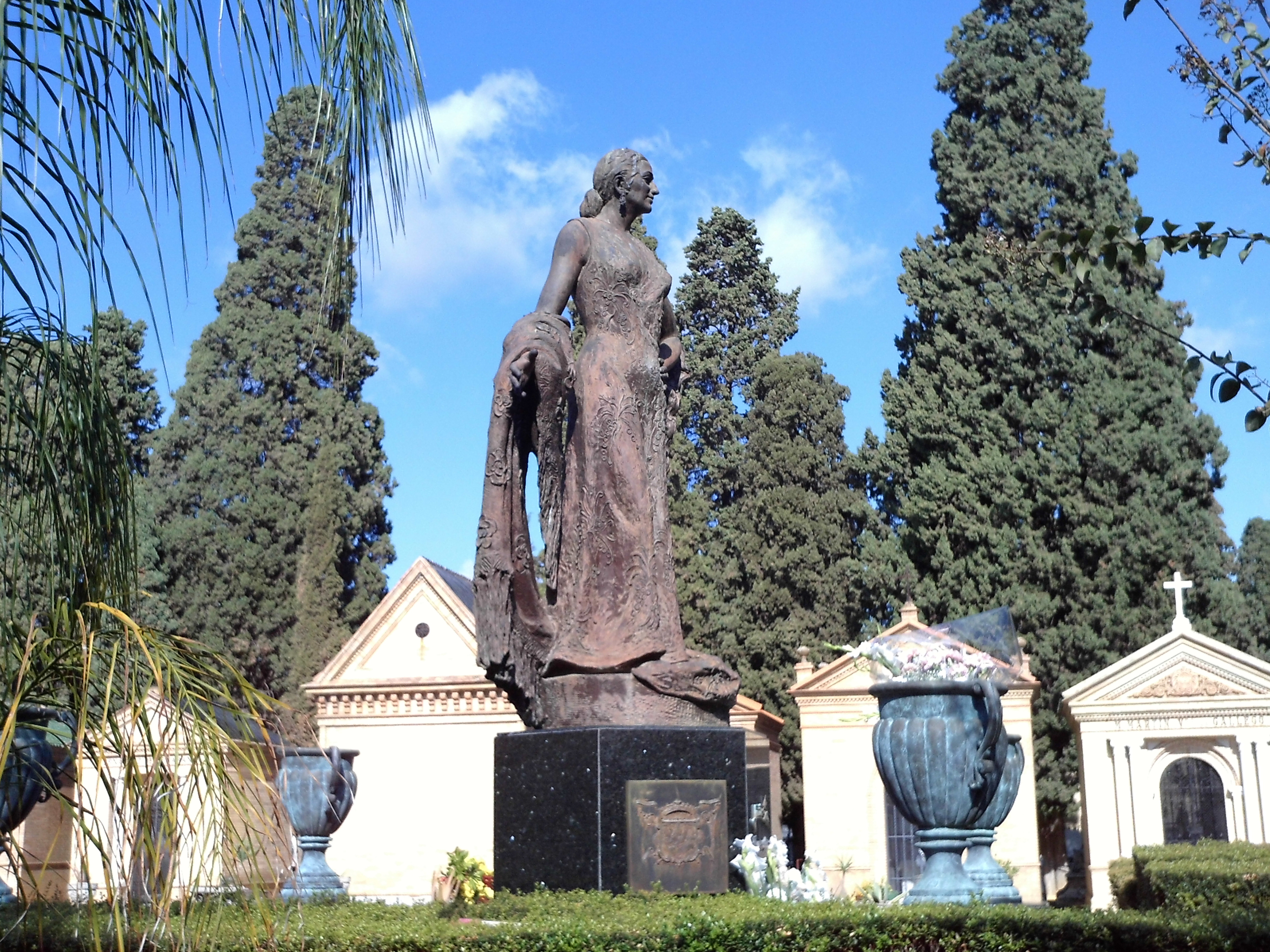
Grave of Juanita Reina at the San Fernando Cemetery in Seville

- The White Dove (1942)
- Cinnamon Flower (1943)
- Serenata española (1947)
- Lola Leaves for the Ports (1947)
- Tempest (1949)
- Lola the Coalgirl (1952)
- Gloria Mairena (1952)
- Airport (1953)
- It Happened in Seville (1955)
- La novia de Juan Lucero (1958)
- Canciones de nuestra vida (1975)
