= Damaged Hearts =

1924 film

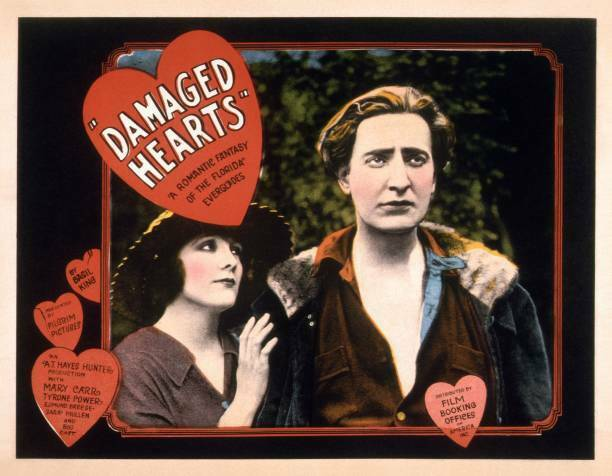
- Directed by: T. Hayes Hunter
- Written by: Barbara Kent; Basil King
- Produced by: T. Hayes Hunter
- Starring: Eugene Strong; Mary Carr; Helen Rowland; Tyrone Power Sr.
- Cinematography: Abe Scholtz
- Production company: Pilgrim Pictures
- Distributed by: Film Booking Offices of America
- Release date: February 21, 1924
- Running time: 70 minutes
- Country: United States
- Language: Silent (English intertitles)

Damaged Hearts is a 1924 American silent drama film directed by T. Hayes Hunter and starring Eugene Strong, Mary Carr, Helen Rowland, and Tyrone Power Sr. It marked the feature film debut of the future star Brian Donlevy.

== Plot ==
As described in a film magazine review, owing the entire world a grudge, David immures himself from society in the Everglades. An orphan, his only sister had been adopted by some wealthy folks but had died, and he was badly treated by Hugh, the son of the family. Later, in revenge he kidnaps Edwina, the wife of Hugh, and they fall in love. Learning that her husband is suspected of having slain her, she returns to her lawful spouse, but finds him with another charmer. The husband seeks revenge, and there is an underwater fight with Hugh and David clad in diving suits. A hunchback, jealous of David, intervenes and accidentally stabs Hugh to death. The Everglades hermit finds happiness with Edwina, the woman he abducted.

== Cast ==
- Mary Carr as The Mother
- Jerry Devine as David (the Boy)
- Helen Rowland as The Girl
- Tyrone Power Sr. as Sandy
- Jean Armour as Celia Stevens
- Thomas Gillen as Hugh Winfield
- Edmund Breese as Innkeeper
- Effie Shannon as His Wife
- Rolinda Bainbridge as The Florida 'Cracker'
- Eugene Strong as David (the Man)
- Florence Billings as Mrs. Langham
- Sara Mullon as Edwina Winfield
- Charles De Forrest as The Cripple
- Brian Donlevy as Jim Porter

== Bibliography ==
- Munden, Kenneth White. The American Film Institute Catalog of Motion Pictures Produced in the United States, Part 1. University of California Press, 1997.
