= The Steadfast Heart =

1923 film

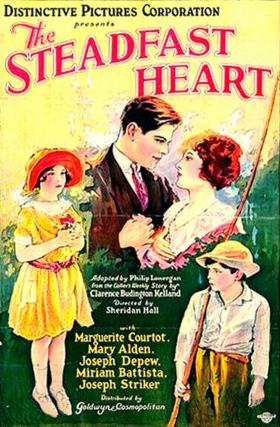
- Film poster
- Directed by: Sheridan Hall
- Written by: Philip Lonergan
- Based on: The Steadfast Heart by Clarence Budington Kelland
- Produced by: Distinctive Pictures
- Starring: Marguerite Courtot; Miriam Battista
- Distributed by: Goldwyn Pictures
- Release date: October 7, 1923
- Running time: 70 minutes
- Country: United States
- Language: Silent (English intertitles)

The Steadfast Heart is a 1923 American silent drama film directed by Sheridan Hall and produced by George Arliss (Distinctive Pictures). Based upon the novel of the same name by Clarence Budington Kelland, the film was released by Goldwyn Pictures.

== Plot ==
As described in a film magazine review, while a boy, Angus Burke shoots and kills a sheriff that is about to arrest his father. His mother dies, and he is tried for murder but is acquitted. He works for the local newspaper, but prejudice forces him to leave the town. Twelve years later, he returns and takes possession of the newspaper. He exposes a plot that intended to rob the citizens and then weds his childhood sweetheart Lydia.

== Cast ==
- Marguerite Courtot as Lydia Canfield
- Miriam Battista as Lydia Canfield, as a child
- Joseph Striker as Angus Burke
- Joseph Depew as Angus Burke, as a child
- Hugh Huntley as Malcolm Crane
- Jerry Devine as Malcolm Crane, as a child
- Sherry Tansey as Birwang
- Mary Alden as Mrs. Burke
- William B. Mack as Crane
- William Black as Henry Woodhouse
- Mario Majeroni as David Wilkins
- Harlan Knight as Jake Bicknell
- Walter P. Lewis as Titus Burke
- Louis Pierce as Trueman
- Mildred Arden as Mary

== Production ==
The Steadfast Heart was partially filmed on location in Fredericksburg, Virginia.

== Preservation ==
A print of The Steadfast Heart survives in France at the Centre national du cinéma archive in Fort de Bois-d'Arcy.
