= The Heart of Wetona =

1919 film by Sidney Franklin

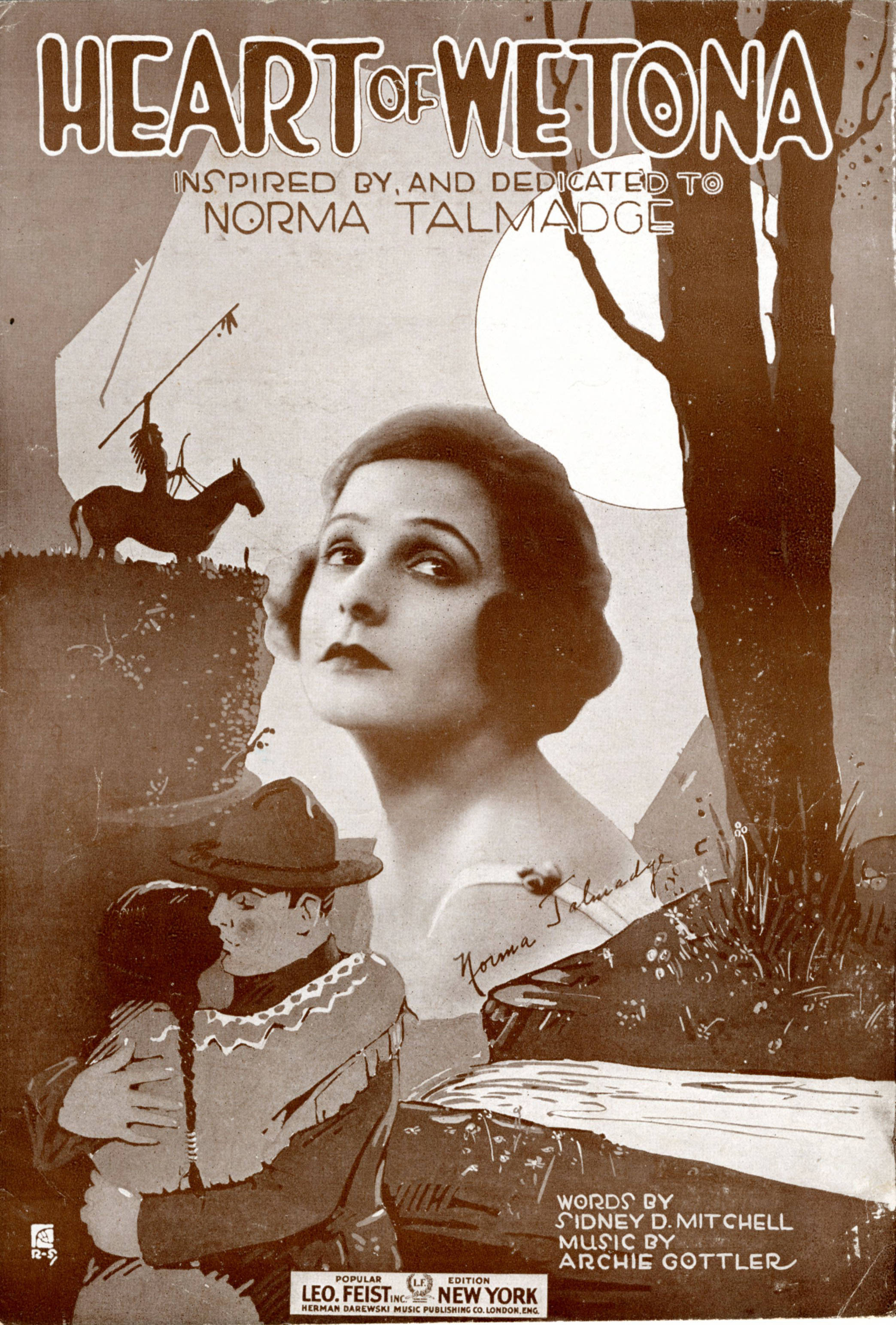
- Directed by: Sidney Franklin
- Written by: Mary Murillo
- Based on: The Heart of Wetona by George Scarborough
- Starring: Norma Talmadge
- Cinematography: David Abel
- Distributed by: Select Pictures
- Release date: January 5, 1919
- Running time: 72 minutes
- Country: United States
- Language: Silent (English intertitles)

The Heart of Wetona is a 1919 American silent adventure drama film directed by Sidney Franklin and starring Norma Talmadge, Fred Huntley, and Thomas Meighan. The film is preserved in several film archives.

== Plot ==
The film tells the story of some Comanche Indians and their preparations for a Corn Dance. The father of Wetona finds out she loves a white man.

== Cast ==
- Norma Talmadge
- Fred Huntley
- Thomas Meighan
- Gladden James
- F.A. Turner
