= Claudio de la Torre (writer) =

Spanish writer and director

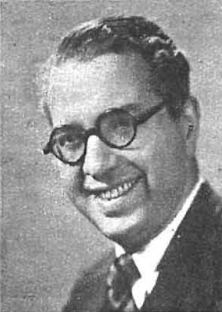
Claudio de la Torre

Claudio de la Torre (October 30, 1895 – January 10, 1973) was a Spanish writer, novelist, poet, dramatist and film director. He was the brother of poet and actress Josefina de la Torre.

== Selected filmography ==
- To Live Happily (1932)
- When Do You Commit Suicide? (1932)
- The White Dove (1942)
