= Josefina de la Torre =

Spanish poet, novelist, opera singer and actress

Josefina de la Torre on a 1944 cover of film magazine Primer Plano, where she worked as a columnist during the 1940s

Josefina de la Torre Millares (25 September – 12 July 2002) was a Spanish poet, novelist, and opera singer, as well as a stage, film, radio, and television actress. She was closely associated with the Generation of '27, an influential group of poets including Ernestina de Champourcín, Juan José Domenchina, Concha Méndez and Carmen Conde, that arose in Spanish literary circles between 1923 and 1927, essentially out of a shared desire to experience and work with avant-garde forms of art and poetry.

In 1934, de la Torre did work as a voice actress for Paramount, dubbing over Marlene Dietrich, and also dubbed Alexander Hall's Miss Fane's Baby Is Stolen (1934). She returned to Madrid in 1935, where she began concentrating on her theatrical and musical repertoire, becoming a successful soprano. In the 1940s, de la Torre gained a reputation as a stage actress at the Teatro Nacional, and also performed in films in the 1940s, several of which were under her brother, Claudio de la Torre. In 1946, the siblings and de la Torre's husband, actor Ramón Corroto, formed the theatre company, Compañía de Comedias Josefina de la Torre, which put on numerous plays, including productions of Miguel Mihura's El caso de la mujer asesinadita and Henrik Ibsen's A Doll's House. She continued as a Madrid-based stage actress in the 1950s and 1960s, although she published two novels in 1954, En el umbral and Memories de una estrella. Despite her success in the Spanish-speaking countries, her poems were not translated into English until 2000 when a bilingual edition of Poemas de la Isla was published with translations of two volumes of her poetry by Carlos Reyes.

== Biography ==
=== Early life and work ===
Born in Las Palmas, Gran Canaria, Canary Islands, Josefina de la Torre Millares was the youngest of six children, the daughter of Las Palmas businessman Bernardo de la Torre y Comminges and Francisca Millares Cubas, the daughter of the historian, novelist and musician Agustín Millares Torres. It is therefore not surprising that her artistic temperament was diverse, although mainly music, poetry and dramatic interpretation. She was introduced into the musical field by her uncle, Néstor de la Torre Comminges, a baritone with extensive experience in the Canaries.

De la Torre began to write poetry from the young age of 8, and in 1915 she wrote a poem dedicated to the modernist poet Alonso Quesada. Her first poem was published in 1920 while her first book, Versos y estampos, published in 1927, was a collection of pieces she wrote in her teens. Her older brother, Claudio de la Torre, became a successful novelist and playwright in the early 1920s, winning the National Book Award in 1924, which inspired his sister. Her work includes four collections of poems and two short stories. Her contribution to poetry during this period led to her association with the Generation of '27, an influential group of poets including Ernestina de Champourcin, Concha Méndez and Carmen Conde, that arose in Spanish literary circles between 1923 and 1927, essentially out of a shared desire to experience and work with avant-garde forms of art and poetry. Their first formal meeting took place in Seville in 1927 to mark the 300th anniversary of the death of the baroque poet Luis de Góngora. From 1927, she gave singing recitals in Madrid, moving increasingly from her literary career into the theatre as she and her playwright brother, Claudio de la Torre created the Teatro Mínimo company in Majorca. In 1934, Gerardo Diego included her as one of only two women in his overview of Spanish poetry Poesia española.

=== Singer and actress ===
In 1934, de la Torre did work as a voice actress for Paramount, dubbing over Marlene Dietrich for films in Joinville, and also dubbed Alexander Hall's Miss Fane's Baby Is Stolen (1934). She returned to Madrid in 1935, where she began concentrating on her theatrical and musical repertoire, becoming a successful soprano. In February 1935 she performed in the "Concierto de 1900" at the Teatro María Guerrero, accompanied on piano by Cipriano Rivas Cherif. She had a stint as the soloist for the Madrid Symphony Orchestra, performing the works of Fauré, Debussy, Esplá, and Saint-Saëns. During the Spanish Civil War she returned to her hometown. There she would publish her first cinematic novels under the pseudonym of Laura de Comminges, publishing the La Novela Ideal collection in 1937.

In the 1940s, de la Torre gained a reputation as a stage actress at the Teatro Nacional, and also performed in films in the 1940s. Between 1944 and 1957, she also performed on stage at the Teatro invisible de RNE. She made her debut in Primer amor, dirigida, directed by her brother Claudio, and she subsequently appeared in the films such as Claudio's La blanca paloma (1942) and Misterio en la marisma (1943), José María Castellví's El camino del amor (1943), Julio de Fletchner's Y tú, ¿quién eres? (1944), Miguel Pereyra's Una herencia en París (1944) and Edgar Neville's La vida en un hilo, su último trabajo (1945), opposite Conchita Montes and Rafael Durán. During this period she also did work as an assistant director, as a screenwriter and from 1942, she was a columnist in the film magazine Primer Plano, appearing on the cover twice. She also participated as an actress in soap operas of the Radio Nacional. She later appeared in television from 1966.

In 1946, de al Torre formed her own theatre company, Compañía de Comedias Josefina de la Torre, in collaboration with her actor husband Ramón Corroto, and her director brother Claudio. They put on numerous plays, including productions of Miguel Mihura's El caso de la mujer asesinadita and Henrik Ibsen's A Doll's House. Until 1958, she also worked in theatres such as Teatro María Guerrero, Dido Pequeño Teatro, and Ensayo del Teatro Español. In the 1960s, she often worked with the likes of Amparo Soler Leal, Nuria Espert, María Fernanda D'Ocón and Vicente Parra. In the late 1960s, she was one of the first actresses, along with Camille Carrión and Eider Barber, to appear in a Spanish musical version of The Sound of Music, for which she earned critical acclaim.

=== Return to writing and death ===
In 1954, she published the novels En el umbral and Memories de una estrella. In her later years, she returned to her poetic roots, with a retrospective named Marzo incompleto in 1968. In 1989, the Biblioteca Básica Canaria published an anthology of her works. However, despite her success in the Spanish-speaking countries, her poems were not translated into English until 2000 when a bilingual edition of Poemas de la Isla was published with translations of two volumes of her poetry by Carlos Reyes. Josefina de la Torre died in Madrid in 2002.
