= Gove, Bhiwandi =

Village in Maharashtra

Gove
- village
- Location in Maharashtra, India Gove (India)
- Coordinates: 19.2564215°N 73.0921755°E
- Country: India
- State: Maharashtra
- District: Thane
- Taluka: Bhiwandi
- Elevation: 11 m (36 ft)

Population (2011)
  - Total: 4,766
- Time zone: UTC+5:30 (IST)
- 2011 census code: 552659

Gove is a village in the Thane district of Maharashtra, India. It is located in the Bhiwandi taluka.

== Demographics ==
According to the 2011 census of India, Gove has 1032 households. The effective literacy rate (i.e. the literacy rate of population excluding children aged 6 and below) is 75.14%.

Demographics (2011 Census)
	Total	Male	Female
Population	4766	2642	2124
Children aged below 6 years	700	377	323
Scheduled caste	440	238	202
Scheduled tribe	116	56	60
Literates	3055	1879	1176
Workers (all)	1893	1580	313
Main workers (total)	1515	1254	261
Main workers: Cultivators	167	123	44
Main workers: Agricultural labourers	24	13	11
Main workers: Household industry workers	71	46	25
Main workers: Other	1253	1072	181
Marginal workers (total)	378	326	52
Marginal workers: Cultivators	57	47	10
Marginal workers: Agricultural labourers	9	8	1
Marginal workers: Household industry workers	26	20	6
Marginal workers: Others	286	251	35
Non-workers	2873	1062	1811
