= The Incorrigible =

1931 film

- Directed by: Leo Mittler
- Written by: George Abbott; Alice Duer Miller (novel); José Luis Salado
- Starring: Enriqueta Serrano; Tony D'Algy; Gabriel Algara
- Cinematography: Fred Langenfeld
- Production company: Paramount Pictures
- Distributed by: Paramount Pictures
- Release date: March 17, 1931
- Running time: 94 minutes
- Country: United States
- Language: Spanish

The Incorrigible (Spanish: La incorregible) is a 1931 film directed by Leo Mittler and starring Enriqueta Serrano, Tony D'Algy and Gabriel Algara. Made at the Joinville Studios in Paris, it is the Spanish-language version of the 1930 American film Manslaughter. Such multi-language versions were common in the early years of film. Paramount Pictures also made French, German and Swedish versions of the film.

== Cast ==
- Enriqueta Serrano as Evelyn
- Tony D'Algy as Roy O'Bannon
- Gabriel Algara as Albee
- Marita Ángeles as Elinor
- Ricardo Baroja as Mason
- Carmen Muñoz as Mary
- Francisco Gómez Ferrer as Detective
- Antonia Arévalo
- Manuel Bernardos
- Antonio Gentil
- Alfonso Granada
- Rafaela Lozano

== Bibliography ==
- Jorge Finkielman. The Film Industry in Argentina: An Illustrated Cultural History. McFarland, 2003.
