= Tony D'Algy =

Portuguese actor (1897–1977)

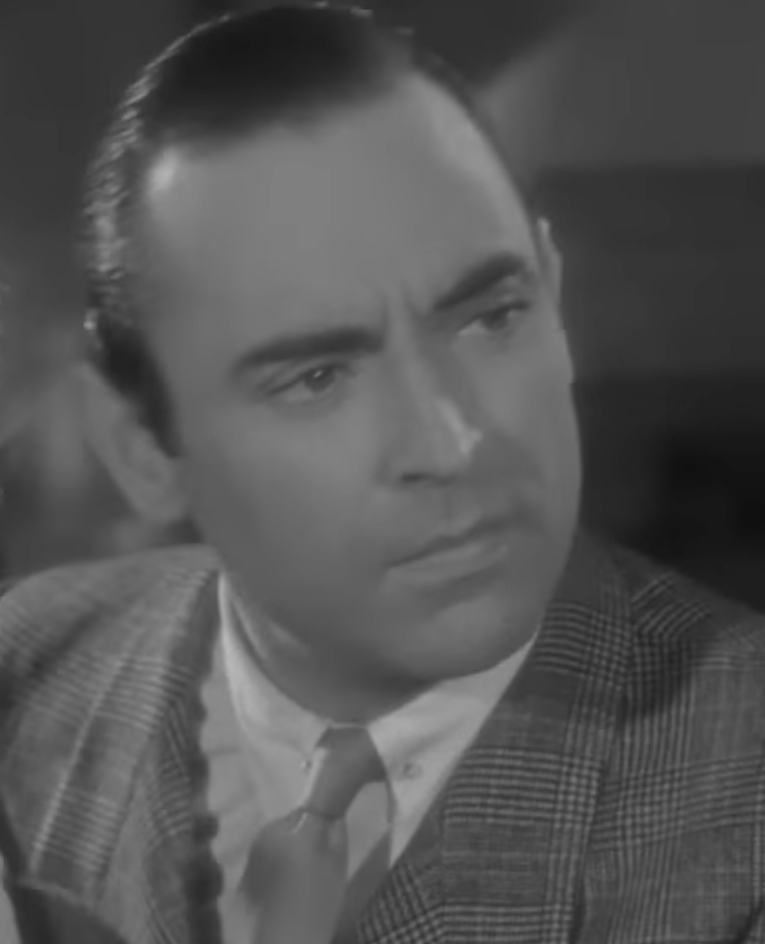
- D'Algy in 1939
- Born: Antonio Eduardo Lozano Guedes; 1897; Luanda, Angola
- Died: 29 April 1977 (aged 79–80); Lisbon, Portugal
- Occupation: Actor
- Years active: 1924–1949

Tony D'Algy (born Antonio Eduardo Lozano Guedes; 1897 – 29 April 1977) was a Portuguese film actor. He appeared in 57 films between 1924 and 1949, including The Boob, a silent comedy where Joan Crawford makes one of her first appearances. He was born in Luanda, Angola, and died in Lisbon, Portugal. He was the older brother of actress Helena D'Algy (born 1906).

== Selected filmography ==
- A Sainted Devil (1924)
- The Rejected Woman (1924)
- Meddling Women (1924)
- Soul Mates (1925)
- The Boob (1926)
- Figaro (1929)
- An Ideal Woman (1929)
- The Incorrigible (1931)
- The Birth of Salome (1940)
- Whirlwind (1941)
- The White Dove (1942)
