= Timothy's Quest (1922 film) =

1922 film

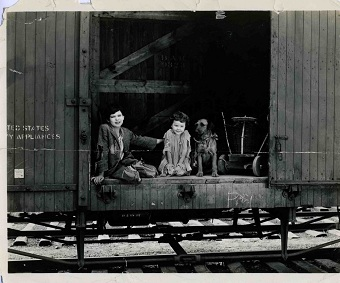
- Lobby card
- Directed by: Sidney Olcott
- Written by: Kathryn Stuart
- Based on: Timothy's Quest by Kate Douglas Wiggin
- Produced by: Charles M. Seay (Dirigo Films)
- Starring: Joseph Depew
- Cinematography: Al Liguori; Eugene French
- Distributed by: American Releasing Corporation
- Release date: September 17, 1922
- Running time: 7 reels
- Country: United States
- Language: Silent (English intertitles)

Timothy's Quest is a 1922 American silent drama film produced by Dirigo Films and distributed by American Releasing. It was directed by Sidney Olcott based on a story written by Kate Douglas Wiggin and starred the child actor Joseph Depew.

The Library of Congress has a copy of this film.

== Cast ==
Timothy's Quest (1922)

- Joseph Depew as Timothy
- Baby Helen Rowland as Lady Gay
- Marie Day as Mrs. Avilda Cummins
- Margaret Seddon as Samantha Ann Ripley
- Bertram Marburgh as Jabe Slowcum
- Vivia Ogden as Hitty Tarbox
- Gladys Leslie as Miss Dora
- William F. Haddock as Dave Milliken
- Rags as The Dog

== Production notes ==
The film was shot in Maine and at Tec-Art Studios, 318 East 48th Street, New York City.
