= Alberto Arroyo =

American runner

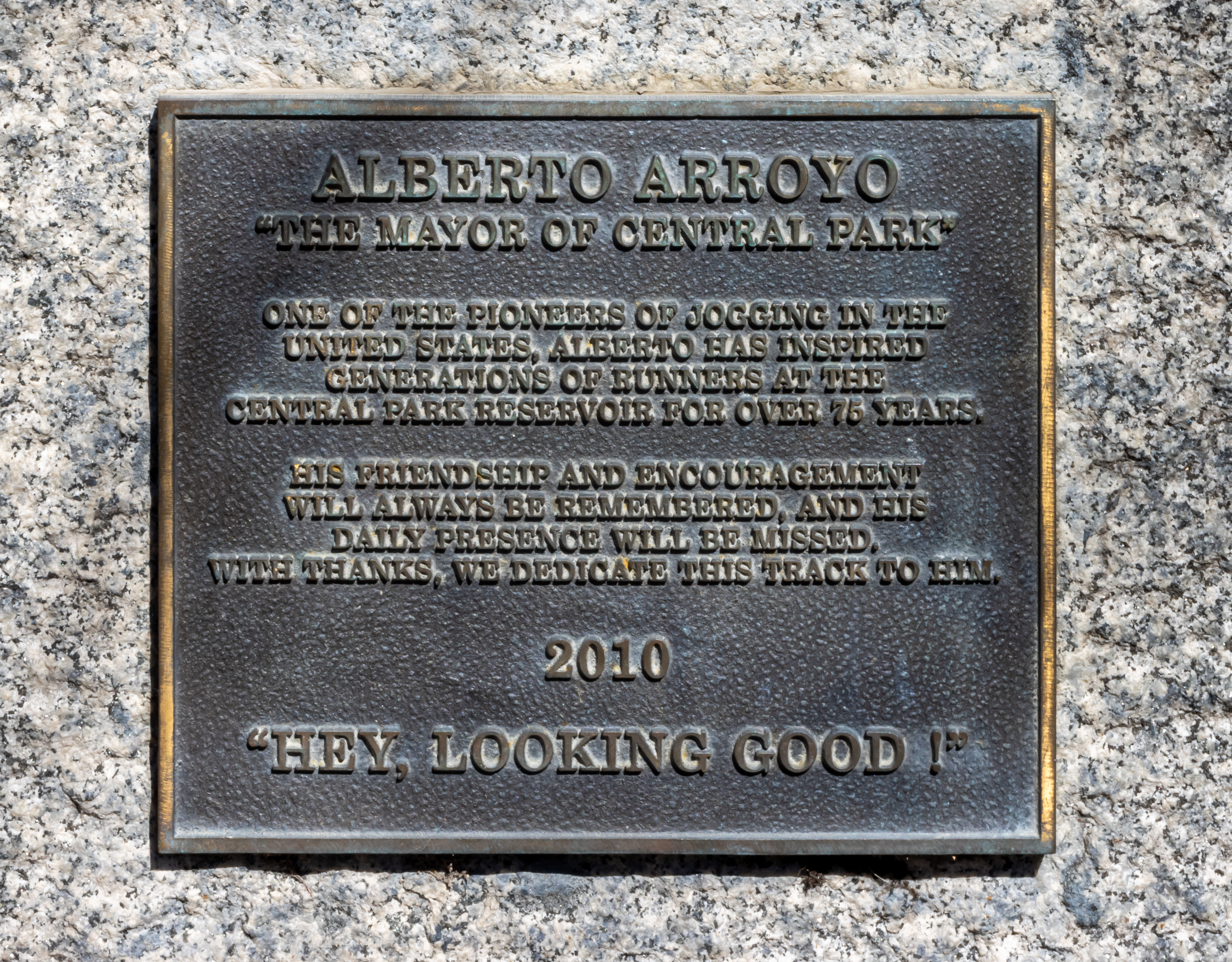
Plaque to Arroyo in Central Park

Alberto Arroyo (February 15, 1916-March 25, 2010) was a well-known New York City runner who was honored with a State Senate resolution in 1985 for his fifty years of running and recognized as one of the founders of the modern fitness movement. Arroyo was an amateur boxer who moved to New York City from Puerto Rico in 1935 who became known as the "Mayor of Central Park." Subsequent to his retirement from Bethlehem Steel, he was known for the many hours he spent in Central Park.

The jogging track around the Central Park Reservoir was named in his honor in part due to his claim to be the first person to run around it. Achilles International has an award named in his honor for his efforts to restore the track in 1993.
