= Marguerite Gove =

American suffragist (1877 –1969)

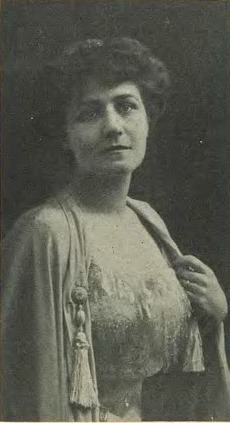
Marguerite Gove

Marguerite Gove (February 1877 – November 1, 1969) was an American suffragist, journalist and short story writer.

== Biography ==
Born as Daisy Pannill in February 1877 in San Francisco, United States, Marguerite Gove was the fifth child of Walter Pannill (1841–1913) and Carrie Reid Jenkins (1848–1895), a journalist. She regularly wrote for the society pages of newspapers in St. Louis and Milwaukee. On October 1, 1903, she married Henry W. Blodgett (1876–1959), US District Attorney for St. Louis. She was granted a divorce in 1911. After the divorce, she moved with her sister to Milwaukee and changed her name Margaret and then Marguerite. While contributing for journals in Milwaukee, she met George R. Gove (1881–1970), a private secretary to Walter L. Fisher, United States Secretary of the Interior. She married Gove and the couple settled in Washington, D.C.

In Washington, D.C., she regularly attended the suffrage events and spoke for women's rights. She involved in the planning of the 1913 woman suffrage procession as vice chair of the hospitality committee. The couple subsequently moved to New York City and settled there for the rest of their lives. In the 1920s, she started working in the film industry and became the scenario editor for the New York-based Bray Studios. Her husband became the director of the New York State Housing Commission and the executive head of the New York State Board of Housing in the 1920s and 1930s.

Along with Ora Carter Colton, she directed a series of educational films. She wrote short stories first under the name of Sidney Poole Sandys. She also wrote the story for the 1924 film Lend Me Your Husband, starring Doris Kenyon and David Powell.

She died on November 1, 1969.
