= George Scarborough (writer) =

American playwright

George Moore Scarborough (1875 – 1951) was an American lawyer, playwright, and writer whose works appeared on stage and screen.

== Biography ==
He was born in Mount Carmel, Texas and studied at Baylor University and University of Texas. He became a lawyer at his father's firm before deciding to write for the theater and moving to New York after his father's death in 1905.

While seeking out a producer for his work, he served as a newspaperman and Secret Service agent. He later used those experiences in his stories.

His Broadway plays include such successes as The Lure (1913), At Bay (1913), The Heart of Wetona (1916), Moonlight and Honeysuckle (1919), and The Son-Daughter (1919), Mrs. Hope's Husband (1921), The Heaven Tappers (1926), The Girl I Loved (1929), and The Moon of Honey (1929). Several of his works were adapted to film.

During a 1929 Los Angeles performance of his play Bad Babies, Scarborough, eight actors and the stage manager were all arrested for staging an "indecent and lewd exhibition." Scarborough subsequently sued the police for $50,000 of damages on behalf of the cast.

His sister Dorothy Scarborough was a novelist and musicologist. Around 1921, he married actress Annette Westbay. They later wrote plays together.

== Theatrical works ==
- The Last Resort
- At Bay (1913)
- The Heart of Wetona (1916)
- The Son-Daughter (1919)
- The Merrie Month of May (c. 1919)
- The Heaven Tappers, co-authored by Annette Westbay
- Bad Babies
- The Mad Dog
- The Lure (1913)

== Film adaptations ==
Several of Scarborough's plays and written works have been adapted into films, including:

- The Lure (1914)
- The Final Judgment (1915)
- At Bay (1915)
- The Painted Madonna (1917)
- Stolen Honor (1918)
- Cupid's Round Up (1918) from his story "Maria of the Roses" (1918)
- The Forbidden City (1918)
- Luck and Pluck (1919)
- The Heart of Wetona (1919)
- Moonlight and Honeysuckle (1921)
- The Grail (1923)
- Hell's Hole (1923)
- The Son-Daughter
- Shameful Behavior? (1926)
