= Helen Rowland (actress) =

American actress (born 1918/1919)

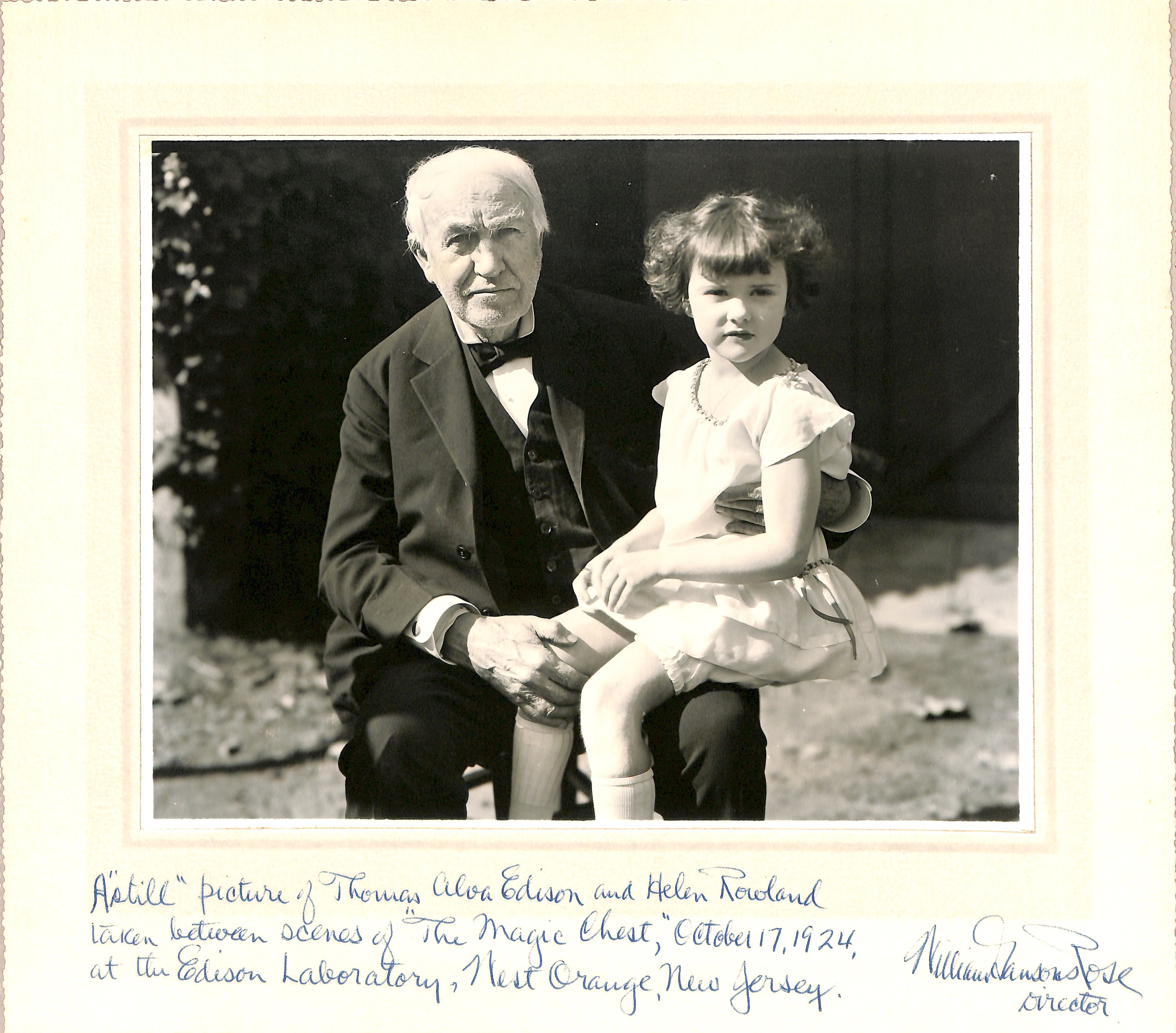
- Helen Rowland with Thomas Edison
- Born: 1918 or 1919
- Other names: Baby Helen Rowland, Baby Helen Lee
- Occupation: Child actress
- Years active: 1922–1927

Helen Rowland (credited in her early films as Baby Helen Rowland, or from the character she played in her second film, Baby Helen Lee; born 1918 or 1919) is an American child actress who appeared in over ten films in the 1920s, starting with the 1922 adaptation of George Eliot's 1861 novel Silas Marner. Her last two roles were in sound films.

== Filmography ==
- Silas Marner (1922) as Eppie
- What's Wrong with the Women? (credited as Baby Helen Lee) (1922)
- Timothy's Quest (1922) as Lady Gay
- Jacqueline (1923)
- His Children's Children
- The Empty Cradle (1923) - as Baby Louise
- The Daring Years (1923) as LaMotte Sister
- Damaged Hearts (1924)
- The Making of O'Malley (1925) as Margie
- The Perfect Sap (1927) - as Cissie Alden
