= Frankie Mann (actress) =

American actress (1892–1969)

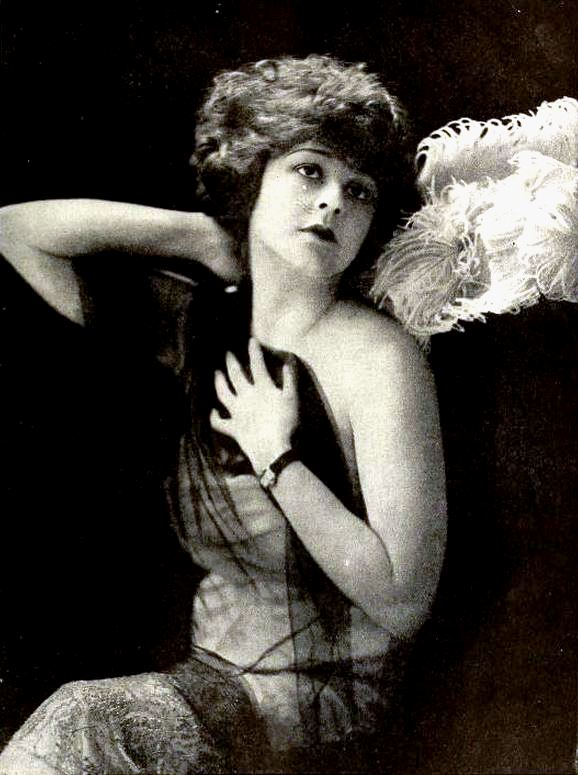
- Frankie Mann, from a 1919 magazine
- Born: Frances Hampton Mann; June 13, 1892; Mill Hall, Pennsylvania, U.S.
- Died: June 23, 1969 (aged 77); New York City, U.S.
- Other name: Frances H. Johnson
- Occupation: Actress
- Spouse(s): Donald Hall (actor), Gardiner P. Johnson
- Relatives: Alice Mann (sister)

Frances "Frankie" Mann (June 13, 1892 – June 23, 1969) was an American actress, who appeared in over forty silent films between 1913 and 1925.

== Early life ==
Frances Hampton Mann was born in Mill Hall, Pennsylvania, and raised in Massachusetts, the daughter of Robert Mann Jr. and Alice Eloise Mann. Her grandfather, Robert Mann Sr., founded an axe company, the Mann Edge Tool Company. Her father, a financier, lost his fortune in the economic Panic of 1907, and died in 1910.

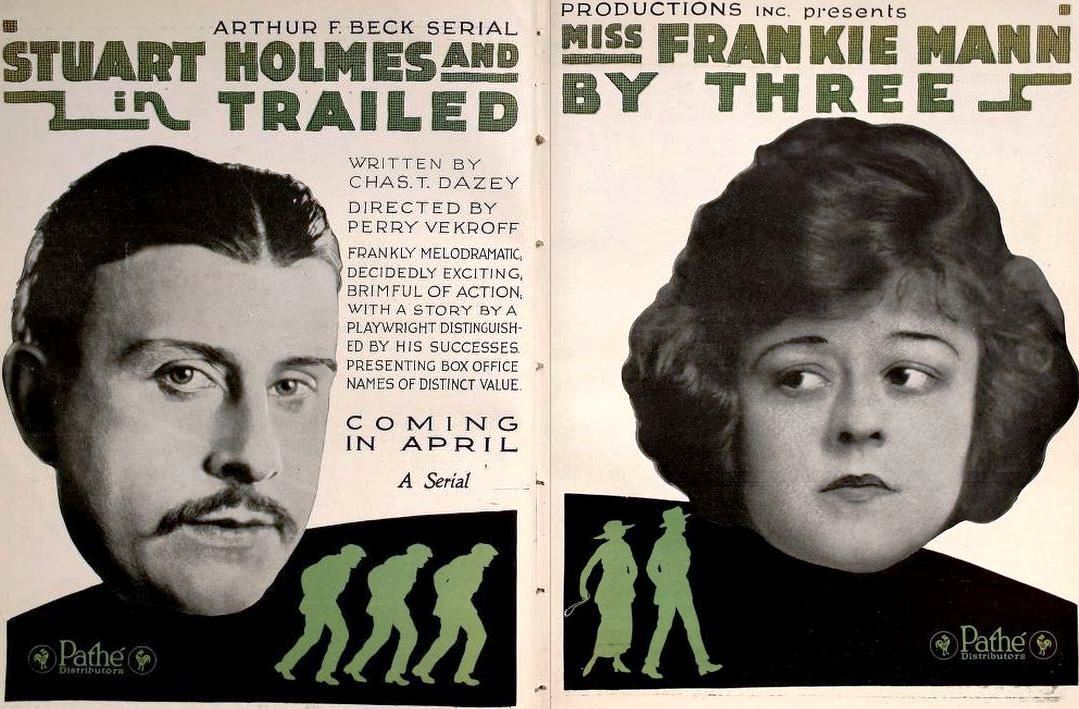
Advertising campaign for Trailed by Three (1920), featuring Stuart Holmes and Frankie Mann

== Career ==
Mann was an actress and appeared in over forty silent films made between 1913 and 1925, with various studios. She was often cast as a "vamp", or temptress character. "Time after time she turned to the camera to register a vampire's sneery smile, and believe me this was awful," reported one reviewer in 1916. "Once or twice would have been enough to have 'queered' her, but she did it all through the film."

Among Mann's film credits were roles in The Battle of Shiloh (1913), Through Fire to Fortune (1914), The Wolf (1914), The House Next Door (1914), The Road o' Strife (1915), The Sporting Duchess (1915), Anselo Lee (1915), The Climbers (1915), The Great Ruby (1915), The Shielding Shadow (1916), Her Surrender (1916), The Sex Lure (1916), The Girl Who Did Not Care (1917), Fortune's Child (1919), The Root of Evil (1919), Fruits of Passion (1919), Trailed by Three (1920), The Place of Honeymoons (1920), The Passionate Pilgrim (1921), Shadows of the Sea (1922), Unconquered Woman (1922), John Smith (1922), On Time (1924), The Fortieth Door (1924), and Barriers Burned Away (1925). Mann also had a stage career, mainly in Philadelphia.

== Personal life ==
Mann married British actor Donald Hall in 1915 and Gardiner P. Johnson in 1923, and had two children. She died in 1969, at the age of 77 in Florida.
