= One Exciting Night =

One Exciting Night may refer to:

- One Exciting Night (1922 film), an American Gothic silent mystery film
- One Exciting Night (1944 film), a British musical comedy film
