= Comedy horror =

Genre that combines elements of horror and comedy

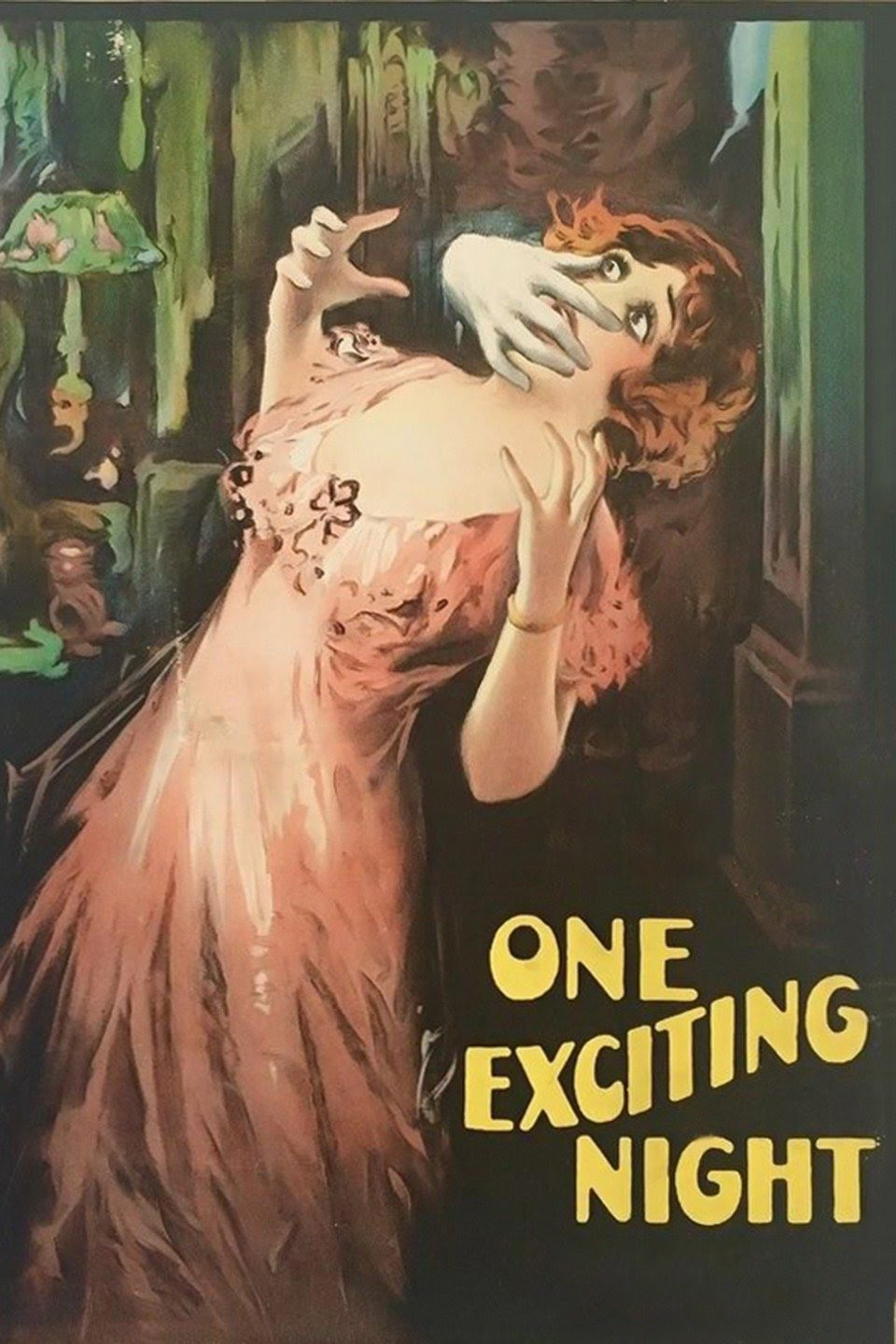
Poster for the American comedy horror film One Exciting Night (1922)

Comedy horror (also called horror comedy) is a literary, television and film genre that combines elements of comedy and horror fiction. Comedy horror has been described as having three types: "black comedy, parody and spoof." Comedy horror can also parody or subtly spoof horror clichés as its main source of humour or use those elements to take a story in a different direction. Examples of comedy horror films include Abbott and Costello Meet Frankenstein (1948), An American Werewolf in London (1981), the Evil Dead franchise (1981–present), Gremlins (1984), Shaun of the Dead (2004) and The Cabin in the Woods (2011).

== In literature ==
Horror and comedy have been associated with each other since the early days of horror novels. Author Bruce G. Hallenbeck cites the 1820 short story "The Legend of Sleepy Hollow" by Washington Irving as "the first great comedy horror story". The story made readers "laugh one moment and scream the next" and its premise was based on mischief typically found during the holiday Halloween.

Shortly after the publication of Mary Shelley's Frankenstein, comedic parodies appeared. Edgar Allan Poe put humor and horror on the same continuum, and many nineteenth century authors used black humor in their horror stories. Author Robert Bloch called them "opposite sides of the same coin".

== In film ==
In comedy horror films, gallows humor is a common element. While comedy horror films provide scares for audiences, they also provide something that dramatic horror films do not: "the permission to laugh at your fears, to whistle past the cinematic graveyard and feel secure in the knowledge that the monsters can't get you".

In the era of silent film, the source material for early comedy horror films came from stage performances instead of literature. One example, The Ghost Breaker (1914), was based on a 1909 play, though the film's horror elements were more interesting to the audience than the comedy elements. In the United States following the trauma of World War I, film audiences sought to see horror on screen but tempered with humor. The "pioneering" comedy horror film was One Exciting Night (1922), written, directed and produced by D. W. Griffith, who noticed the stage success of the genre and foresaw a cinematic translation. The film included blackface performances and footage of a hurricane for a climactic storm. As an early experiment, the various genres were not well-balanced with horror and comedy, and later films improved the balance and took more sophisticated approaches. Charles Bramesco of Vulture.com identifies Abbott and Costello Meet Frankenstein as the first commercially successful comedy horror film. Its success legitimized the genre and established it as commercially viable.

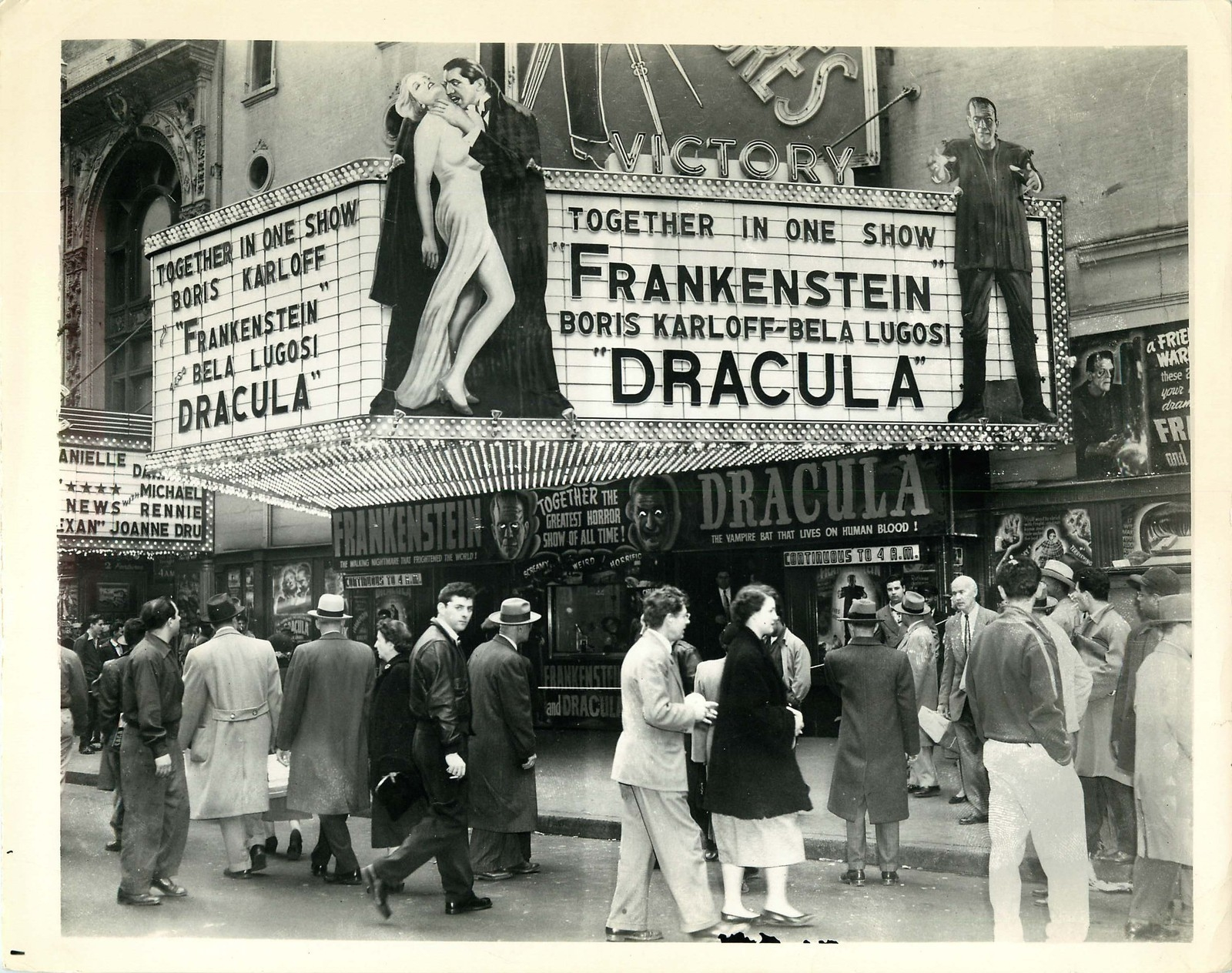
Frankenstein & Dracula In Theatres in New York City, 1952.

Following the success of Universal’s classic monster films, horror comedies in the mid-20th century often combined slapstick humor with supernatural elements. Films like The Fearless Vampire Killers (1967) blended parody with gothic horror. This era established the foundation for later films that would more evenly mix horror and comedy.

=== Slapstick and gore in horror comedy (1980s–1990s) ===
The 1980s marked a shift toward more extreme and graphic horror comedies. Films like An American Werewolf in London (1981), Evil Dead II (1987) and Braindead (1992) featured elaborate practical effects and exaggerated gore, merging body horror with absurd humor. Other notable entries, such as Gremlins (1984) and Beetlejuice (1988), embraced fantasy-horror elements while maintaining a comedic tone suitable for wider audiences.

The 1990s saw a continuation of self-aware horror comedies, as seen in Scream (1996), which satirized slasher tropes while still functioning as a horror film. This approach influenced later films that incorporated meta-humor.

=== Meta-horror and satirical trends (2000s–present) ===
Horror comedies in the 21st century frequently incorporate meta-commentary on the horror genre itself. Scary Movie (2000) and its sequels directly parodied popular horror films, such as Scream (1996) and I Know What You Did Last Summer (1997). Unlike traditional horror-comedies, Scary Movie primarily functions as a comedy with horror references. Films such as Shaun of the Dead (2004) offered a comedic but heartfelt homage to zombie cinema. Cabin in the Woods (2012) took a self-aware approach by deconstructing horror archetypes.

In the 2010s and 2020s, horror comedies also began incorporating social satire. Get Out (2017) blended psychological horror with dark humor to critique racial dynamics, while Ready or Not (2019) and Bodies Bodies Bodies (2022) used horror-comedy to comment on class and generational divides.

== In television ==
Horror comedy on television dates back to classic sitcoms like The Munsters and The Addams Family and has since expanded to include a variety of styles. Notable examples range from the gory slapstick of Ash vs Evil Dead and Stan Against Evil to mockumentaries like the What We Do in the Shadows franchise and Wellington Paranormal. Other comedic horror series include Todd and the Book of Pure Evil, Shining Vale, and Santa Clarita Diet, while animated entries feature Beetlejuice, Invader Zim, School for Vampires, Scooby-Doo, Courage the Cowardly Dog, and The Grim Adventures of Billy & Mandy. More recent additions to the genre include The Ghost and Molly McGee, Wednesday, Don't Hug Me I'm Scared, Gravity Falls, Hazbin Hotel, Helluva Boss, and Bunsen Is a Beast.

== See also ==
- List of comedy horror films
- List of genres
- Zombie comedy – a subgenre involving zombies
- Black comedy

== Bibliography ==
- Hallenbeck, Bruce G. (2009). Comedy-Horror Films: A Chronological History, 1914–2008. Jefferson, NC: McFarland & Company, Inc. ISBN 978-0-7864-3332-2.
