= The Man with Two Faces (1934 film) =

1934 film by Archie Mayo

- 1934 theatrical poster
- Directed by: Archie Mayo
- Screenplay by: Tom Reed; Niven Busch
- Based on: The Dark Tower; 1933 play by George S. Kaufman; Alexander Woollcott
- Produced by: Robert Lord; Hal B. Wallis; Jack L. Warner
- Starring: Edward G. Robinson; Mary Astor
- Cinematography: Tony Gaudio
- Edited by: William Holmes
- Music by: Leo F. Forbstein; Bernhard Kaun
- Production company: First National Pictures
- Distributed by: Warner Bros. Pictures
- Release date: August 4, 1934
- Running time: 72 minutes
- Country: United States
- Language: English

The Man with Two Faces is an American drama film directed by Archie Mayo, and starring Edward G. Robinson and Mary Astor. The supporting cast features Ricardo Cortez, Louis Calhern, Mae Clarke, and David Landau. The story was adapted by Tom Reed and Niven Busch from the play The Dark Tower by George S. Kaufman and Alexander Woollcott.

The Man with Two Faces was actress Margaret Dale's last film and her only talkie. She and Anton Stengel are the only two actors from the Broadway play to appear in the film. In 2010, this film became available on DVD from the Warner Archive Collection.

== Plot ==
Jessica Wells is a beautiful and talented actress, returning to the stage after a three-year absence. Although her triumphal return seems certain, family and friends are shocked when Vance, her long-lost husband with a criminal past, shows up at the family home. He immediately exerts his influence on the vivacious Jessica, and she becomes a sleepwalking automaton blindly obeying orders.

The avaricious and opportunistic Vance (who appears carrying pet mice in a cage) has heard that his wife holds half the rights to the play in which she will be featured, a prospective hit, but a certain disaster in her somnambulist state.

Stage star Damon Wells lends theatrical prestige to his sister's comeback while helping to reclaim her talent as her acting coach. He and Jessica's manager realize that the verminous Vance must be dealt with at once, so Damon begins an elaborate ruse, presenting himself to the schemer as the bearded French theatrical producer Jules Chautard.

Vance is lured to a hotel room by Jules/Damon, thinking that he will be paid handsomely for Jessica's half-interest in the play, but is instead drugged and then stabbed to death. Damon cannily covers his tracks in the murder, but he accidentally leaves a few theatrical mustache-whiskers when closing a Gideon Bible.

Police Sergeant William Curtis cracks the case when he connects the artificial hair to the art of an actor and confronts Damon in his dressing room. The detective, however, is aware of the suspicious past of the victim and not unsympathetic to the actor. Wells is left with the suggestion that he can perhaps act his way out of the rap.

== Cast ==
(in credits order)

- Edward G. Robinson as Damon Wells / Jules Chautard
- Mary Astor as Jessica Wells
- Ricardo Cortez as Producer Ben Weston
- Mae Clarke as Daphne Flowers
- Louis Calhern as Stanley Vance
- Arthur Byron as Dr. Kendall
- John Eldredge as Horace "Barry" Jones
- David Landau as Sergeant William Curtis
- Emily Fitzroy as Hattie, Martha's Housekeeper
- Henry O'Neill as Inspector Crane
- Anton Stengel as Stage Manager
- Arthur Aylesworth as Morgue Keeper
- Margaret Dale as Aunt Martha Temple
- Virginia Sale as Peabody, Weston's Secretary
