= The Dark Tower (play) =

1933 mystery drama

The Dark Tower is a mystery drama by George S. Kaufman and Alexander Woollcott, first produced in 1933.

The play was later adapted for the Warner Bros. film The Man with Two Faces (1934) starring Mary Astor, Louis Calhern, and Edward G. Robinson. In 1943, Warners remade the film in England as The Dark Tower with Ben Lyon and Anne Crawford.

In January 1938, the future President of the United States Richard Nixon was cast in the Whittier Community Players production of this play. He was cast opposite a high school teacher named Thelma "Pat" Ryan, whom he would later marry.

A half-hour radio adaptation, starring Orson Welles, was broadcast on Suspense! radio program on May 4, 1944.
