= The Unpardonable Sin =

1919 film by Alfred Edward Green, Marshall Neilan

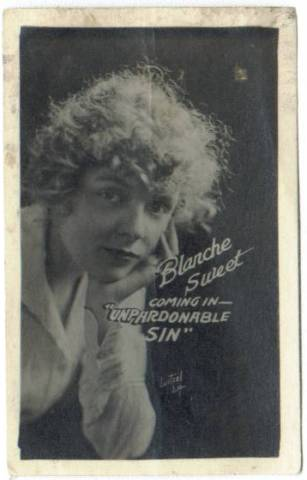
- Blanche Sweet coming attraction shot
- Directed by: Marshall Neilan; Alfred E. Green (assistant director)
- Written by: Kathryn Stuart (scenario)
- Based on: The Unpardonable Sin by Rupert Hughes
- Produced by: Harry Garson; Blanche Sweet
- Starring: Blanche Sweet; Edwin Stevens; Mary Alden
- Cinematography: Tony Gaudio; Henry Cronjager
- Production company: Blanche Sweet Productions / Harry Garson Productions
- Distributed by: World Pictures
- Release date: March 2, 1919
- Running time: 9 reels (2,700 meters)
- Country: United States
- Language: Silent (English intertitles)

The Unpardonable Sin is a 1919 American silent drama/propaganda film set during World War I. The film was produced by Harry Garson, directed by Marshall Neilan, written by Kathryn Stuart, and stars Neilan's wife, Blanche Sweet, who portrays dual roles in the film. The Unpardonable Sin is based on the novel of the same name by Rupert Hughes. The Silent Era site reports that it is not known whether the film currently survives, suggesting that it is a lost film. However, prints and/or fragments did turn up in the Dawson Film Find in 1978, so some of it at least survives.

== Plot ==
As described in a film magazine, the film follows two American sisters, Alice and Dimny Parcot (Sweet in a dual role). Alice and their mother (Alden) are stranded in Belgium when World War I breaks out. Both are raped by German soldiers. Dimny, who is still in the United States, is found by Nol Windsor (Moore), a medical instructor, in a faint on the street. He takes her to his home and learns she is bound for Belgium in search of her mother and sister. Nol is going over to Belgium for the Commission for Relief in Belgium, and they apply for passports at the same time. Dimny is refused a passport because she is single, so they agree to marry in name only to facilitate their travel. In Belgium they meet Colonel Klemm, the German officer who outraged her sister Alice, and he mistakes Dimny for his victim. After undergoing many insults and affronts, Nol and Dimny finally find Alice and her mother, secure passports for them, and they start for the Dutch border. When Colonel Klemm lures Dimny to his quarters and attacks her, Nol arrives in time to rescue her, and a race to the border begins. They eventually escape and Nol and Dimny find happiness.

== Cast ==
- Blanche Sweet as Alice Parcot / Dimny Parcot
- Edwin Stevens as Stephen Parcot
- Mary Alden as Mrs. Parcot
- Matt Moore as Nol Windsor
- Wesley Barry as George Washington Sticker
- Wallace Beery as Colonel Klemm
- Bull Montana as The Brute
- Bobby Connelly as Boy Scout

== Reception ==
Like many American films of the time, The Unpardonable Sin was subject to cuts by city and state film censorship boards. For example, upon its release, the film was banned by the Kansas Board of Review due to its depiction of rape. The censorship board of Milwaukee, Wisconsin, initially banned the film but after protests in the press authorized the showing of the film with cuts, in Reel 1, of the scene showing Blanche Sweet standing against the wall with clothing disheveled and the shadow of a soldier next to her, Reel 2, portion of scene with Belgian priest where he falls, the intertitle "On every side the cruel reminder of motherhood.", scene of soldiers using machine gun on people and people falling, Reel 4, the intertitle "At Malines they encountered Suslich, whose specialty is searching pretty women. He to whom chastity is hard should be counseled against it.", and to eliminate all searching of woman scenes where her clothing is torn off by brutal soldiers.

== See also ==
- War rape
- Blanche Sweet filmography
