= Coney Island (1917 film) =

1917 film by Roscoe Arbuckle

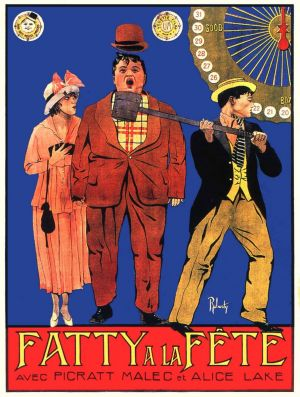
- French theatrical poster for film
- Directed by: Roscoe Arbuckle
- Written by: Roscoe Arbuckle
- Produced by: Joseph M. Schenck
- Starring: Roscoe Arbuckle; Buster Keaton; Al St. John
- Cinematography: George Peters
- Edited by: Herbert Warren
- Distributed by: Paramount Pictures
- Release date: October 29, 1917
- Running time: 24 minutes
- Country: United States
- Language: Silent (English intertitles)

Coney Island (also known as Fatty at Coney Island) is a 1917 American two-reel silent comedy film starring, written and directed by Roscoe "Fatty" Arbuckle and featuring Buster Keaton.

Full film

== Plot ==
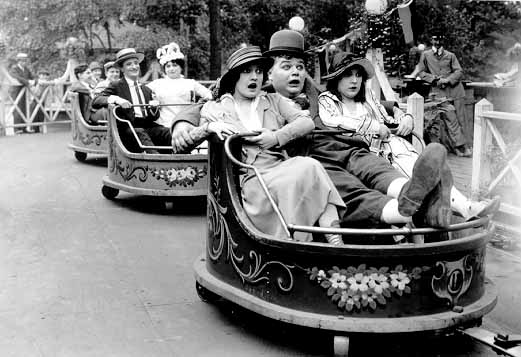
Fatty rides "The Whip" in Coney Island

Fatty has been dragged along to Coney Island by his wife who insists they spend their time together on the beach. Getting inspiration from a dog digging a hole in the sand, Fatty ditches his wife by burying himself in the sand then making a run for the amusement park as she searches for him. Fatty's wife enlists the help of an old friend who enters the park to look for Fatty, however once inside he notices an attractive young lady who is there on a date with a young man and promptly woos her into entering the park with him rather than Rival, leaving the latter distraught.

Finding he has no money, Rival gains entry to the park by hiding in a barrel and follows Pretty Girl and Old Friend around the park. Once inside, Rival and Old Friend both attempt to impress Pretty Girl, Rival by trying to win on the high striker and Old Friend by buying her ice cream but Pretty Girl is ultimately unimpressed by both men's childish behavior

Fatty shows up on the scene and is likewise smitten with Pretty Girl and begins making polite conversation with her. When Old Friend returns with the ice cream, Fatty pretends he got them for her in order to impress her which it does. Old Friend furiously threatens Fatty, but Fatty kicks a nearby policemen in the rear and makes him think Old Friend did it leading to the latter being arrested.

Fatty and Pretty Girl next go for a ride on the log flumes but the force of the impact upon hitting the water sends both flying into the surrounding pool. Rival saves Pretty Girl and Fatty but is immediately knocked accidentally into the pool by Fatty who, seeing that Rival can swim and will not drown, once again walks off with Pretty Girl. Spotting his wife looking for him, Fatty takes Pretty Girl into a nearby boathouse and the two dress up (Fatty as a woman and Pretty Girl in a new dress and a long wig) to avoid detection before heading to the beach.

Arbuckle's wife has heard that Old Friend has been arrested and bails him out of jail and the two go to the beach to come up with a new plan where they bump into Fatty and Pretty Girl in their disguises. Old Friend finds himself attracted to Fatty dressed up as a woman and flirts with him before Rival arrives on the scene and reveals that the woman is in fact Fatty. Furious, Old Friend chases Fatty to the sea where they begin to fight. Pretty Girl, realizing that Old Friend is a sleazy womanizer and Fatty has a wife, decides to return to Rival and the two run off down the beach together. Fatty's wife calls the police to break up the fight and three police officers arrive at the beach to arrest both men. They are taken to jail but before they can be locked up they overpower all of the cops and throw them in the jail cell. Before Fatty can leave he receives a furious dressing down from his wife until he can take no more and throws her in the jail cell as well.

In the film's closing moments Fatty and Old Friend stand on the police steps and agree that the pursuit of women was the reason for all of their misfortune today and both swear off women for good. However, just after making this pact two attractive women walk past them and the two gleefully give chase.

In the original ending to the film Arbuckle approaches a well-dressed woman on the street. She turns and is revealed to be a Black woman. Arbuckle mugs for the camera and runs away in a parody of fear. Most cuts of the film since the 1920's have deleted this reveal and end the film with Arbuckle approaching the woman from behind.

== Cast ==
- Roscoe "Fatty" Arbuckle - Fatty
- Agnes Neilson - Fatty's wife
- Al St. John - Old friend of Fatty's wife
- Buster Keaton - Rival / cop with mustache
- Alice Mann - Pretty girl
- Joe Bordeaux - Sledgehammer Man / Cop (as Joe Bordeau)
- Jimmy Bryant
- Alice Lake
- Luke the Dog - uncredited

== Production notes ==
The film was shot on location at Coney Island, and prominently features many contemporary rides and attractions as venues for the slapstick action. These include The Witching Waves and Shoot-the-Chutes.

Coney Island was filmed before Keaton had fully established his screen persona. Because of this, he employs a wide range of facial expressions, including mugging and laughing, differing drastically from his subsequent unsmiling, but still eloquent, expression.

Arbuckle breaks the fourth wall in one scene where, about to change his clothes, he directly looks at the camera and gestures for it to raise its view above his waist; the camera obligingly does so.

== Reception ==
Like many American films of the time, Coney Island was subject to cuts by city and state film censorship boards. The Chicago Board of Censors required a cut of a scene with a girl raising her dress above her knee. The original ending was considered racist by the mid-1920s and was cut from the film.

== Preservation ==
A 35 mm print is held by George Eastman House.

== See also ==
- List of American films of 1917
