= The Water Lily (film) =

1919 film by George Ridgwell

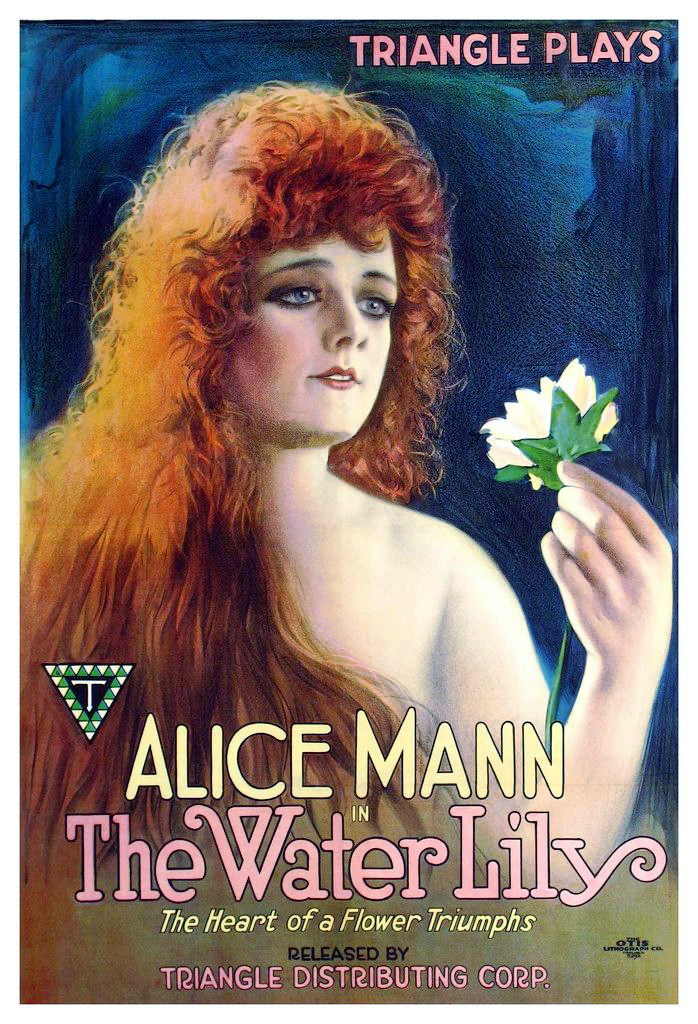
- Film poster
- Directed by: George Ridgwell
- Written by: Lillian Case Russell
- Produced by: Triangle Film Corporation
- Starring: Alice Mann
- Cinematography: Harry L. Keepers
- Distributed by: Triangle Distributing
- Release date: May 18, 1919
- Running time: 50 minutes
- Country: United States
- Language: Silent (with English titles)

The Water Lily is a 1919 American silent drama film directed by George Ridgwell and starring Alice Mann.

Prints survive in the Library of Congress collection and the BFI National Archive.

== Cast ==
- Alice Mann - Genevieve Conners
- Emil De Varney - Jim Conners
- Philip Yale Drew - Dick Carlisle
- Francis Mann - Evelyn Carlisle
- Donald Hall - Willard Carlisle
- Eloise Hampton - Mrs. Lawson
- Charles A. Robins - Biff Dunton
- Edgar Wedd - Dwight Lawson
- Leatrice Joy - ?
