= Kempton Greene =

American actor

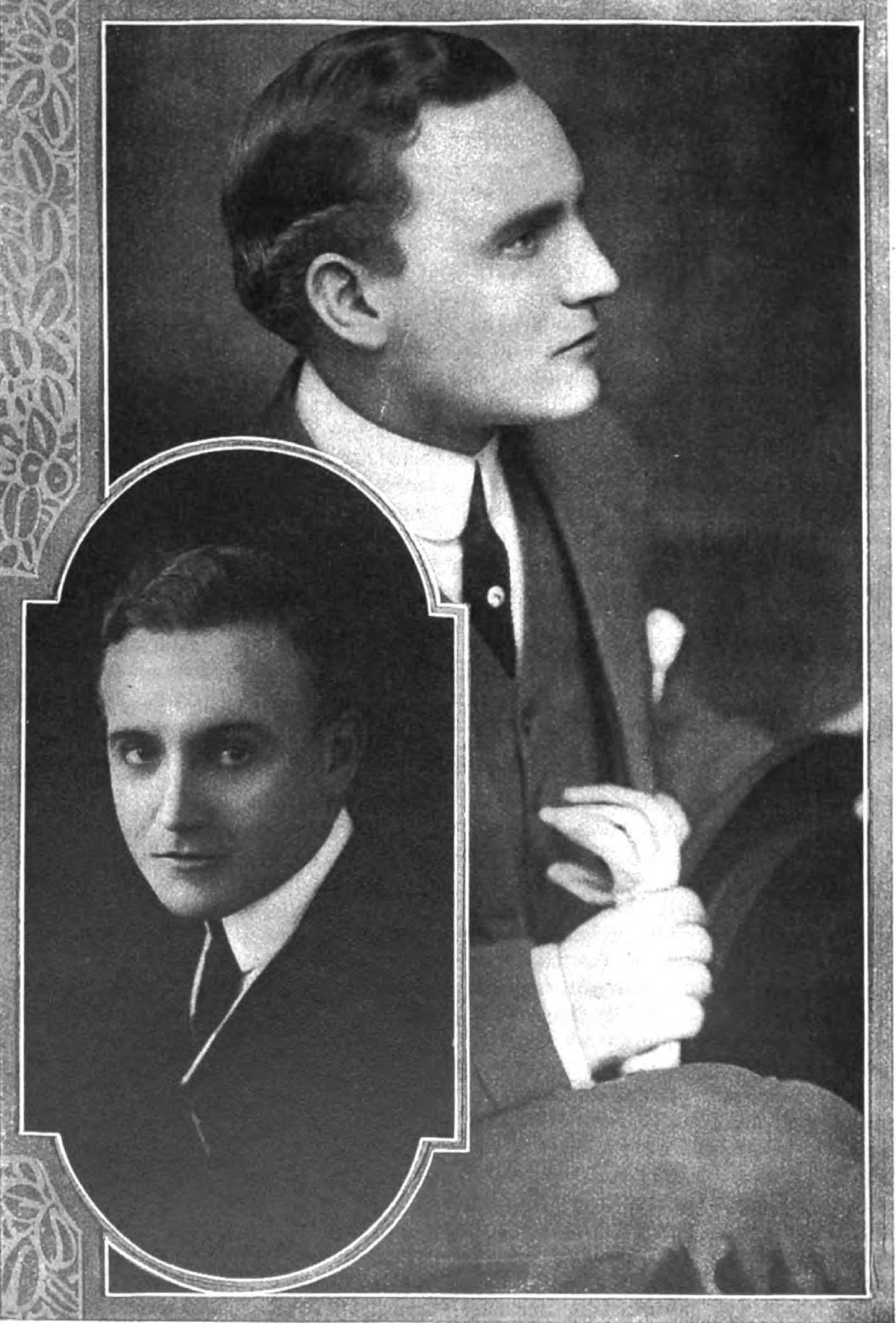
- Photos of Greene from Motion Picture Magazine (September, 1915)
- Born: June 28, 1889; Philadelphia, Pennsylvania, US
- Died: May 17, 1939 (aged 49); Trenton, New Jersey, US
- Occupation: Actor
- Years active: 1911–1921

I like to specialize in wayward sons, dissolute brothers, and bad boys generally.

— Kempton Greene, Motion Picture Classic, February 1916, page 40.

Kempton Greene (June 28, 1889 – May 17, 1939) was an American film actor of the silent era. He appeared in more than 80 films between 1911 and 1921, sometimes playing opposite Louise Huff. He was born in Philadelphia, Pennsylvania. George Terwilliger gave him his first part in his play, "The Cry of the Blood," and then brought him to St. Augustine, Florida, where the silent film industry flourished. He is listed in 35 silent films in the Braff working papers.

== Selected filmography ==
- Brown of Harvard (1911)
- The Daughters of Men (1914)
- Love and Bullets (1916)
- The Eyes of Mystery (1918)
- Brown of Harvard (1918)
- Our Little Wife (1918)
- Fool's Gold (1919)
- My Little Sister (1919)
- Sentimental Tommy (1921)
- Ten Nights in a Bar Room (1921)
- Behind Masks (1921)
- The Family Closet (1921)
