= Away Goes Prudence =

1920 film by John S. Robertson

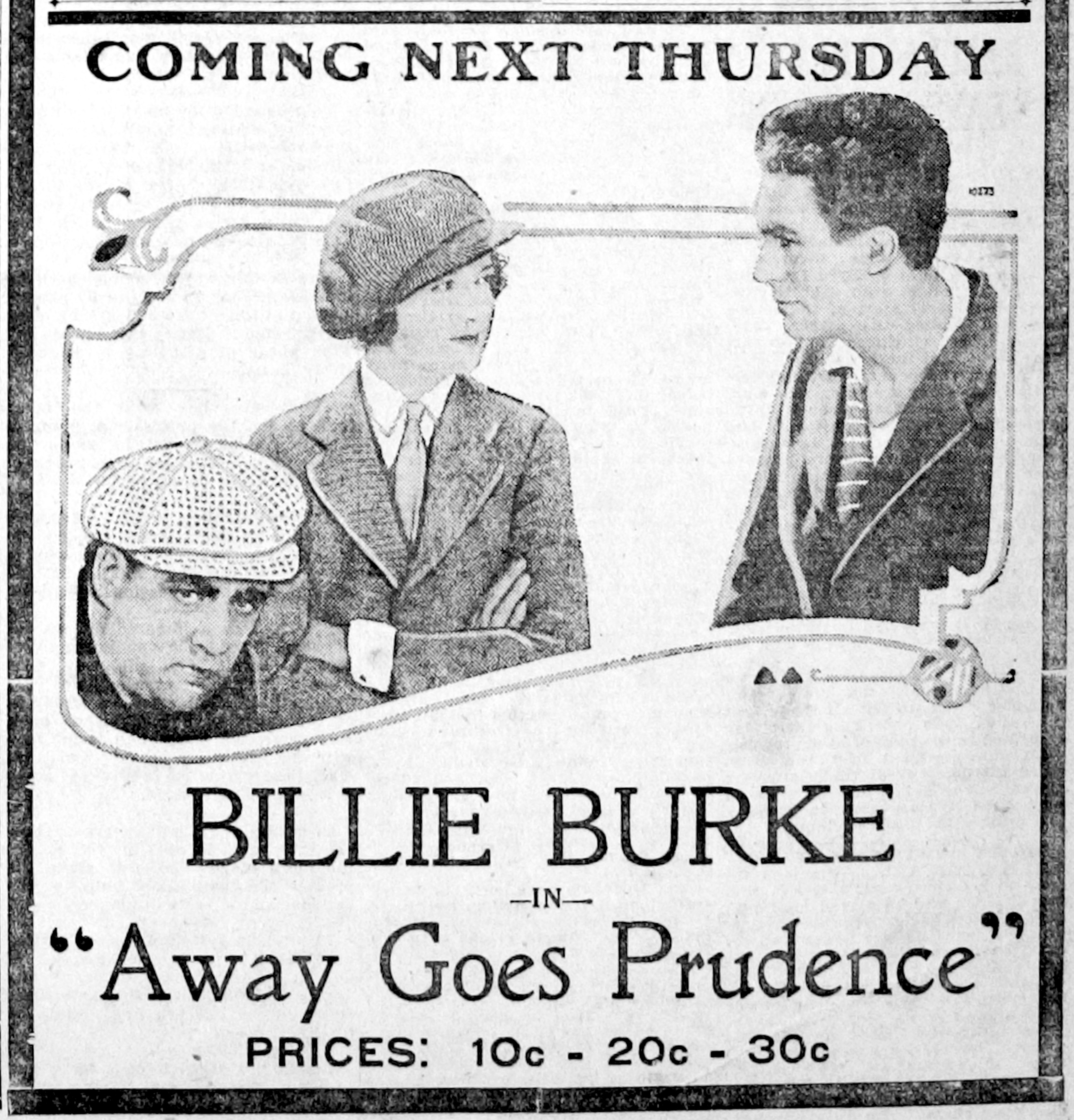
- A newspaper advertisement for the film
- Directed by: John S. Robertson
- Written by: Josephine Lovett (story); Kathryn Stuart (scenario)
- Produced by: Adolph Zukor; Jesse L. Lasky
- Starring: Billie Burke
- Cinematography: Roy Overbaugh
- Production company: Famous Players–Lasky/Artcraft
- Distributed by: Paramount Pictures
- Release date: July 1920
- Running time: 5 reels (5,046 feet)
- Country: United States
- Language: Silent (English intertitles)

Away Goes Prudence is a 1920 American silent comedy film produced by Famous Players–Lasky and distributed by Paramount Pictures. This picture was directed by John S. Robertson and starred Billie Burke. Screenwriter Josephine Lovett provided a story direct for the screen. This is now considered a lost film.

== Cast ==
- Billie Burke as Prudence Thorne
- Percy Marmont as Hewitt Harland
- Maude Turner Gordon as Aunt Prudence Thorne
- Charles Lane as Mr. Thorne
- Dorothy Walters as Mrs. Ryan
- Bradley Barker as Michael Ryan
- M. W. Rale as Chinaman
- Albert Hackett as Jimmie Ryan
