= The Family Closet =

1921 silent film

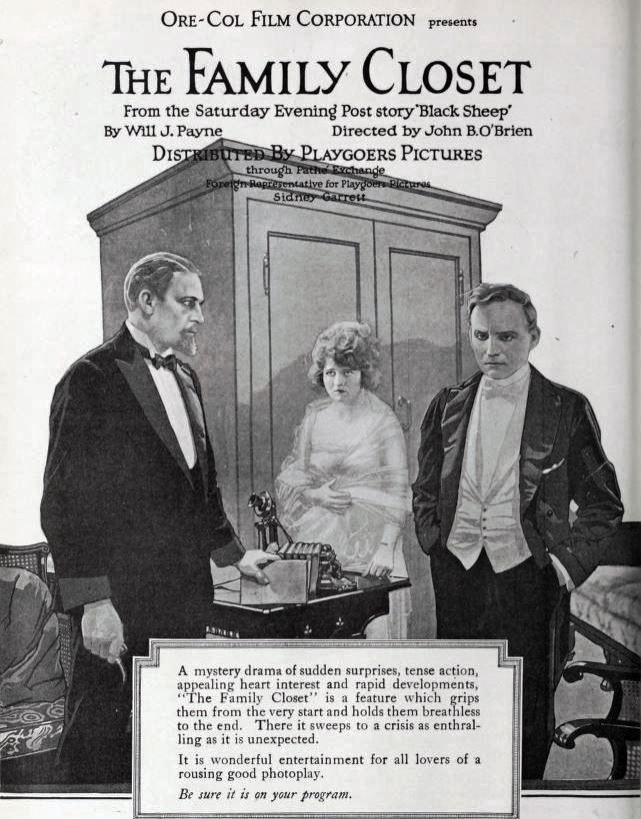
- Directed by: John B. O'Brien
- Written by: Will J. Payne
- Starring: Holmes Herbert; Alice Mann; Kempton Greene
- Cinematography: Larry Williams
- Production company: Ore-Col Film Corporation
- Distributed by: Playgoers Pictures
- Release date: September 18, 1921
- Running time: 60 minutes
- Country: United States
- Languages: Silent; English intertitles

The Family Closet is a 1921 American silent mystery film directed by John B. O'Brien and starring Holmes Herbert, Alice Mann and Kempton Greene.

== Cast ==
- Holmes Herbert as Alfred Dinsmore
- Alice Mann as Louise Dinsmore
- Kempton Greene as Ned Tully
- Byron Russell as J. Wesley Tully
- Josephine Frost as Mrs. Tully
- Walter Ware as Charles Purcell
- John Webb Dillion as Denis J. McMurty
- Verne Layton as Lowell Winthrope
- Walter P. Lewis as John Colby
- May Kitson as Mrs. Dinsmore

== Bibliography ==
- Goble, Alan. The Complete Index to Literary Sources in Film. Walter de Gruyter, 1999.
