= Margaret Dale (actress) =

American actress

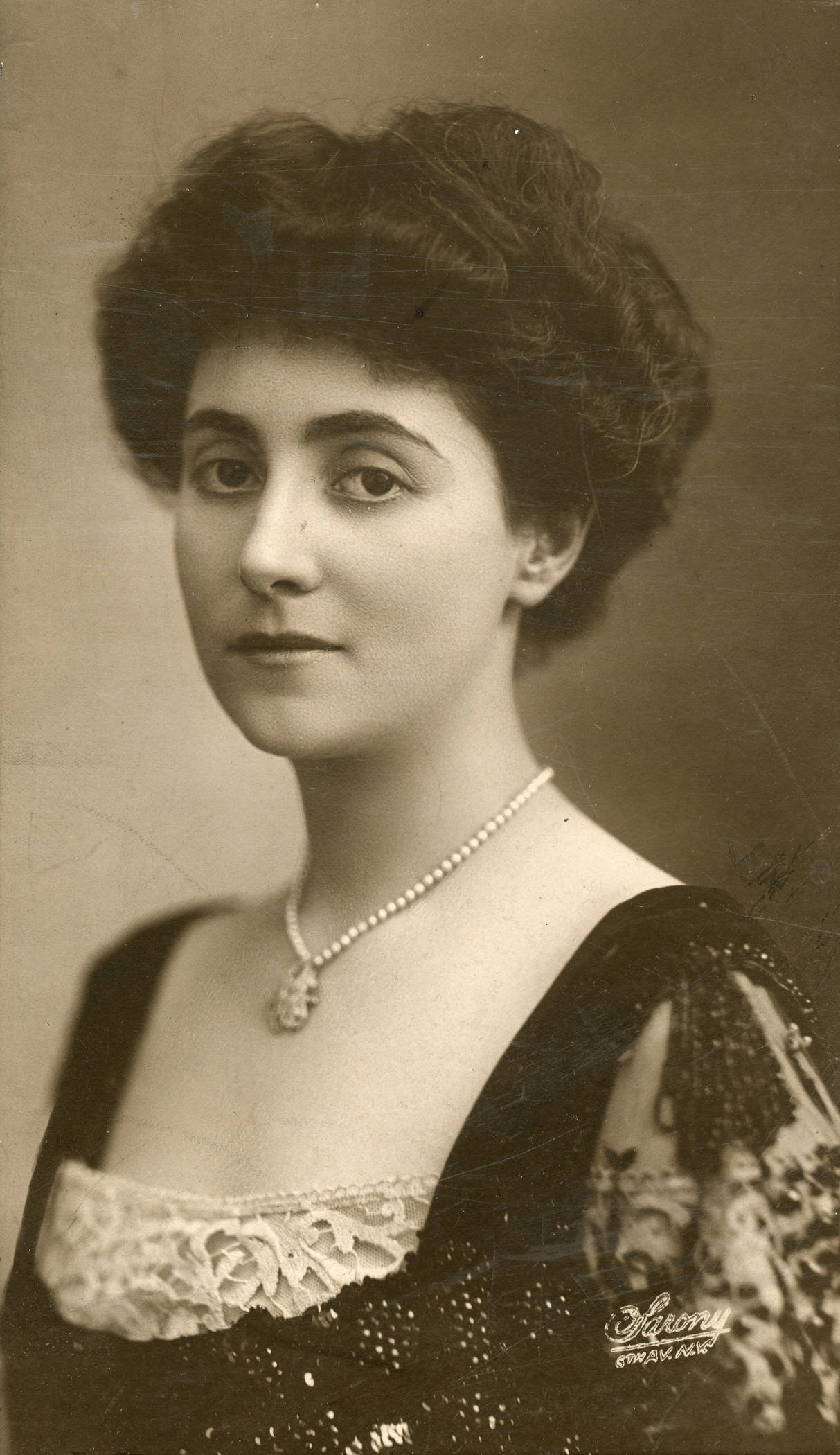
- Born: Margaret Rosendale; March 6, 1876; Philadelphia, Pennsylvania, U.S.
- Died: March 23, 1972 (aged 96); New York City, U.S.
- Occupation: Actress
- Years active: 1898–1948

Margaret Dale (born Margaret Rosendale; March 6, 1876 – March 23, 1972) was an American stage and film actress. She performed on Broadway for over fifty years and occasionally did films in the 1920s. She appeared in a large number of Broadway hits over the course of her years as an actress.

== Early life ==
Margaret Rosendale was born on March 6, 1876, in Philadelphia, Pennsylvania, although some sources give her birth year as 1880. Her father was Julius Rosendale, a wealthy physician, jeweler and translator. She was interviewed in Munsey's Magazine in 1903 where a brief noting of her career had her living in Germantown at one time and was currently single and living with her mother.

== Theater career ==
She began her career in Charles Frohman acting company in 1898, often in support of the leading actors such as Henry Miller. She became the leading lady of John Drew from 1902 to 1905. She appeared in the George Ade western Father and the Boys 1908-1911. Dale performed with George Arliss in the long running play Disraeli, 1911 to 1917. In 1923 she portrayed Mrs. Horatio Winthrop in Rudolf Friml's Broadway musical Cinders. In the mid-1920s she was part of an ensemble cast that included Mary Boland, Edna May Oliver, Humphrey Bogart, Raymond Hackett and Gene Raymond in the popular play The Cradle Snatchers.

== Motion Pictures ==
In 1920 Dale appeared in her first feature movie The World and His Wife, directed by Robert G. Vignola. She would appear in six films between 1920 and 1934 preferring the theater. She rejoined Arliss in 1921 for the film version of Disraeli which was produced by his production company Distinctive and released through United Artists. Dale did not return to Arliss when he made his talking version of Disraeli in 1929 for Warner Brothers.

In 1922 Dale appeared in D. W. Griffith's One Exciting Night, a haunted house melodrama. This movie had all the spirit of a Mary Roberts Rinehart story, then gaining popularity, but was an original story by Griffith. One Exciting Night was shot at Griffith's Mamaroneck studios on Long Island. The 1921 version of Disraeli is a lost film with one reel in existence at the George Eastman House. However a complete print is rumored to exist at Gosfilmofond in Russia. One Exciting Night was on home video (VHS) briefly in the 1990s. In 2014 it is available on DVD from Alpha Video Dale's last film and only talkie was The Man with Two Faces starring Edward G. Robinson and Mary Astor and now available from Warner Archive Collection. Dale died in New York in March 1972.

== Filmography ==
- The World and His Wife (1920) *lost film
- Disraeli (1921)
- One Exciting Night (1922)
- Second Youth (1924)
- Week End Husbands (1924) *lost film
- The Man with Two Faces (1934)

== Sources ==
- "ABOUT STAGE PEOPLE; Margaret Dale to be John Drew's New Leading Woman". The New York Times. February 20, 1902.
- Appelbaum, Stanley Great Actors and Actresses of the American Stage in Historic Photographs: 332 Portraits from 1850-1950, c. 1983
- Fells, Robert M. George Arliss: The Man Who Played God, c. 2004
- Fells, Robert M. The 1921 "Lost" Disraeli: A Photo Reconstruction of the George Arliss Silent Film c.2013
