= Parnell (film) =

1937 film by John M. Stahl

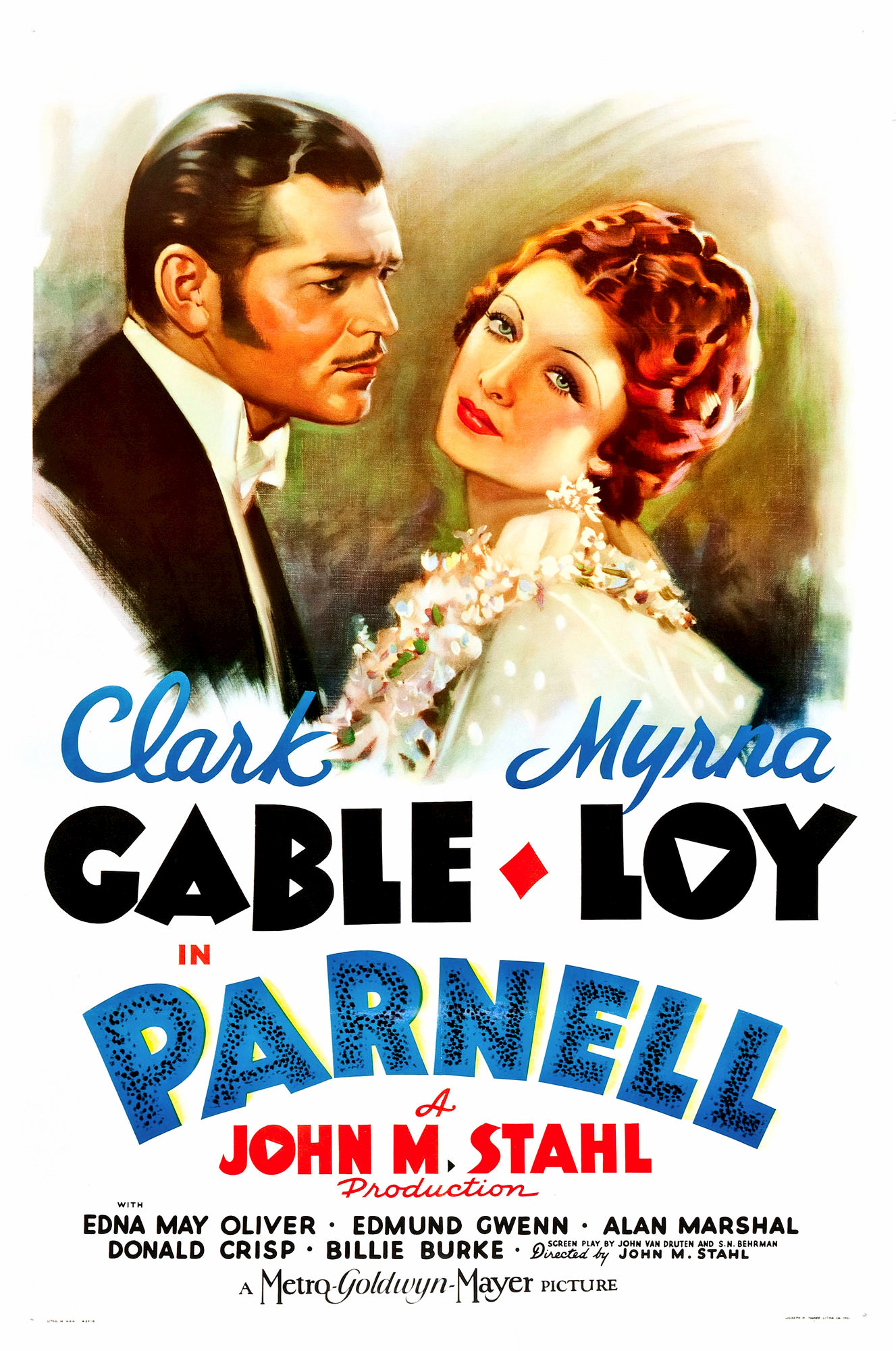
- Directed by: John M. Stahl
- Written by: John Van Druten; S. N. Behrman
- Based on: Parnell; 1935 play by Elsie T. Schauffler
- Produced by: John M. Stahl
- Starring: Clark Gable; Myrna Loy; Edna May Oliver; Edmund Gwenn
- Cinematography: Karl Freund
- Edited by: Frederick Y. Smith
- Music by: Dr. William Axt
- Production company: Metro-Goldwyn-Mayer
- Distributed by: Loew's Inc.
- Release date: June 4, 1937
- Country: United States
- Language: English
- Budget: $1.5 million
- Box office: $1.6 million

Parnell is a 1937 American biographical film produced by Metro-Goldwyn-Mayer, starring Clark Gable as Charles Stewart Parnell, the famous Irish politician. It was Gable's least successful film and is generally considered his worst, and it is listed in The Fifty Worst Films of All Time. The movie addresses the adulterous relationship that destroyed Parnell's political career, but its treatment of the subject is highly sanitized (and fictionalized) in keeping with Hollywood content restrictions at the time.

== Plot ==
The life of Irish politician and Home Rule activist Charles Stewart Parnell.

== Cast ==
Credited cast

- Clark Gable as Charles Stewart Parnell
- Myrna Loy as Katie O'Shea
- Edna May Oliver as Aunt Ben Wood
- Edmund Gwenn as Campbell
- Alan Marshal as Captain William O'Shea
- Donald Crisp as Davitt
- Billie Burke as Clara Wood
- Berton Churchill as The O'Gorman Mahon
- Donald Meek as Murphy
- Montagu Love as Gladstone
- Byron Russell as Healy
- Brandon Tynan as Redmond
- Neil Fitzgerald as Pigott/Dr. Gillespie
- George Zucco as Sir Charles Russell

Uncredited cast

- Halliwell Hobbes as W.H. Smith
- Robert Homans as Irish Cop in New York
- Olaf Hytten as House of Commons Member
- Murray Kinnell as Sir Richard Webster
- Frank Mayo as Judge
- Frank McGlynn Sr. as Pat Hogan
- Lee Strasberg as Pat
- Frank Sheridan as Sheriff

== Production ==
Parnell had originally been cast to star Gable and his frequent co-star Joan Crawford. Myrna Loy, meanwhile, was to star in The Last of Mrs. Cheyney (1937). Metro-Goldwyn-Mayer flipped the assignments as Crawford did not want to do another costume picture after 1936's The Gorgeous Hussy. Another issue was how much to alter Gable's appearance to suit the period when the film took place. Fans balked at the idea of Gable wearing a beard as the real Parnell had done, and Gable, whose limit in facial hair was his mustache, agreed with them. He wound up adding only a set of sideburns instead of a beard.

The film was Gable’s pet project. He insisted MGM make the film and wanted Joan Crawford as his co-star. She thought the story was dull and would not agree to star in it with him. Gable was so upset he refused to speak to her for months. Later, when the film bombed at the box office and with critics, he told her she was right. As filming began, Gable felt very uneasy with his role, either unable or unwilling to portray the sensitive nature required to capture the character. Loy later recalled, "I learned about another side of him at that time. He was a man who loved poetry and fine literature, read it, and knew it. He would read poetry to me sometimes during breaks, but he didn't want anyone to know it." One of the many concerns that Gable had about this production was the acting that would be required of him to play out a believable death scene. During the filming of the death scene, Stahl put on mood music to help the actors get into character. Gable loathed the music and complained to Carole Lombard. The next day, when Stahl called for the music to be turned on, a jazzy version of "I'll Be Glad When You're Dead, You Rascal You", went floating throughout the studio.

== Reception ==
According to MGM records Parnell earned $992,000 in the US and Canada and $584,000 elsewhere, resulting in a loss of $637,000.

Writing for Night and Day in 1937, Graham Greene gave the film a mildly poor review, decrying the anodyne and sterilized story and condemning "the Metro-Goldwyn-Mayer dream of how history should have happened". Greene's only concession was that he was well "pleas[ed] to think how ... virginal and high-minded" were MGM's dreams.

The film was included in the 1978 book The Fifty Worst Films of All Time (and How They Got That Way) by Harry Medved, Randy Dreyfuss, and Michael Medved.

Parnell has been labeled the worst film in both Gable's and Loy's long and successful film careers. Loy said of the film later, "Disgruntled fans wrote to the studio by the thousands — they did that in those days. Some of the critics complained that we played against type. We were actors, for God's sake. We couldn't be Blackie Norton and Nora Charles all the time."

Following Parnell, Gable vowed never to do a costume drama or biopic again. Its failure made Gable afraid of doing Gone with the Wind, but he was persuaded otherwise, and ultimately went on to his greatest success with his role as Rhett Butler.
