= Oh Doctor! (1917 film) =

1917 film

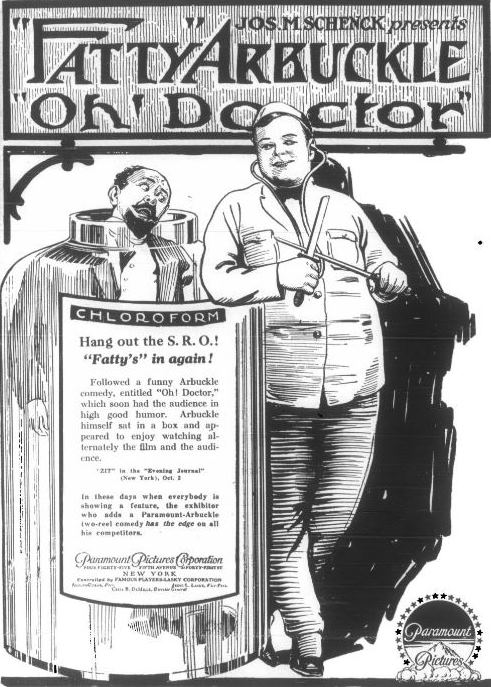
- Advertisement in Variety magazine
- Directed by: Roscoe Arbuckle
- Written by: Jean Havez; Joseph Anthony Roach
- Starring: Roscoe Arbuckle; Buster Keaton
- Cinematography: George Peters
- Edited by: Herbert Warren
- Production company: Comique Film Company
- Distributed by: Paramount Pictures
- Release date: September 30, 1917
- Running time: 23 minutes
- Country: United States
- Language: Silent (English intertitles)

Oh Doctor! (1917) by Roscoe Arbuckle

Oh Doctor! is a 1917 American two-reel silent comedy film directed by and starring Roscoe "Fatty" Arbuckle and featuring Buster Keaton.

== Plot ==
Young Dr. Holepoke arrives at the horse-racing with his teenage son and his wife. The doctor flirts with a nearby girl. He stabs his son in the knee with a pin so that his wife swaps seats and he ends up next to the girl. She asks what he specializes in and he gestures the poking of holes.

A tipster Snapper whispers to the girl to bet all on "Lightning" and the doctor eavesdrops.

He bets $1000 on Lightning with a dodgy character standing outside the clubhouse. The race begins. Lightning is last then runs the wrong way. His money is gone. "If we don't have an epidemic soon we will be out begging" he quips as he rips up the betting slip. They drive home to 31 Cemetery Way.

He goes to his study and reads a letter from the funeral home, M. Balm Moribund, asking for a list of his critically ill patients.

Meanwhile the tipster is in his own home talking to the girl and finds the doctor's calling card. They decide to lure him to their house and she calls him on the telephone and says she has accidentally drunk a bottle of shoe polish. En route to the girl he stops the car to listen to a soap salesman expounding the idea that using his soap will mean you never need a doctor and you will "live until you die". He gets out of the car and lets it run into the small crowd which is listening to the salesman. He whistles to his car and it comes back to him.

At the girl's house the maid answers the door and watches as he diagnoses the girl. He brings cocktail ingredients out of his bag and mixes to drinks. She asks if it is "bottoms up time".

Downstairs the maid is visited by her policeman friend who takes off his jacket. Snapper has gone to the doctor's house and starts stealing things. He is spotted by Junior and jumps out of the window. Junior follows him down the street.

A friend calls with a message to the tipster to put $500 on "Romeo". The girl takes the message. She shows the doctor the secret sign to get into the illegal betting shop and he gets in and makes the bet.

Snapper gets home and gives the girl a necklace he stole from Mrs Holepoke. Junior watches and phones mum who then realizes her loss. The doctor goes back to the girl and she hides the necklace. Snapper hides in a cupboard.

Junior has told mother where her necklace is so she goes there too and knocks on the door. The doctor panics. He hides in the pantry and finds the police uniform. He puts it on and also creates a fake mustache. The wife enters and the two women start to fight, Snapper comes out of the cupboard and gets knocked out by them. The mother gets shut in the cupboard.

Snapper panics when he sees the policeman and escapes to the flat roof. He has the necklace. The doctor chases him but his mustache falls off. Snapper falls through a roof light back into his living room. Mother gets out and gets her necklace back. Junior arrives with the real police and arrest Snapper and the girl.

At the racetrack Romeo wins at odds of 500 to 1 so the doctor wins a fortune. But he forgets how he is dressed and goes to the illegal gambling shop dressed as a policeman. All staff and customers run off through the back door so he helps himself to all the money. His wife drags him home by the ear.

== Cast ==
- Roscoe "Fatty" Arbuckle as Dr. Fatty Holepoke
- Buster Keaton as Junior Holepoke
- Al St. John as Snapper the Gambler
- Alice Mann as the girl/Vamp
- Alice Lake as Snapper's Maid

== Reception ==
Like many American films of the time, Oh Doctor! was subject to cuts by city and state film censorship boards.

The Chicago Board of Censors required a cut of the scene where a man is pulling a women's skirt up to her knees.
