= The Place of Honeymoons =

- Directed by: Kenean Buel
- Written by: Ida Harrison
- Based on: the 1912 novel, The Place of Honeymoons by Harold MacGrath
- Starring: Emily Stevens; Montagu Love; Frankie Mann; Joseph Selman
- Production company: Atlas Film Corp.
- Distributed by: Pioneer Film Corp.
- Release date: November 1920 (US)
- Running time: 5 reels
- Country: United States
- Language: English

The Place of Honeymoons is a 1920 silent American film written by Ida Harrison and directed by Kenean Buel. It stars Emily Stevens, Montagu Love, Frankie Mann and Joseph Selman.

== Cast list ==
- Emily Stevens as Nora Harrigan
- Frankie Mann as Celeste Furnier
- Joseph Selman as Grand Duke Michael
- Mabel Bardine as Flora Desimone
- Herbert Evans as Herr Rosen
- Montagu Love as Edward Courtlandt
- Charles Coleman as Jimmie Harrigan
- Edward Cullen as Donald Abbott
- Harry Guy Carleton as Colonel Wester
- Mlle. Nila Devi as "The Darling of Paris"
- Anonia Petrucelli as Barone Galli
- Mabel Whitcomb as Nora's mother

== Production ==
The production was filmed in Newton, Massachusetts at the Atlas Film Company studios. While ready for release earlier in the year, it was not distributed until November 1920 by Pioneer Films.

== Reception ==
Moving Picture World did not give the film a good review. They felt the film's pace was slow and rambling, and the relationship between the two leads, Emily Stevens and Montagu Love, was never well developed. While they enjoyed Love's performance, the felt that Stevens was miscast and not carry off her role well.
