= Fruits of Passion (1919 film) =

1919 silent film

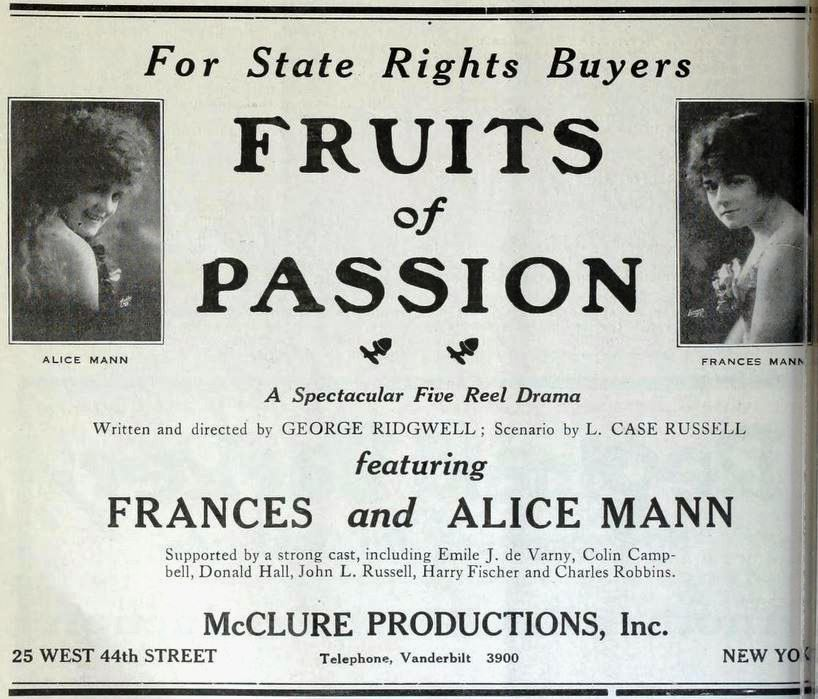
- Directed by: George Ridgwell
- Written by: Henry Russell Miller (novel); Lillian Case Russell
- Starring: Alice Mann; Donald Hall
- Production company: McClure Publishing
- Distributed by: Triangle Distributing
- Release date: August 9, 1919
- Running time: 50 minutes
- Country: United States
- Languages: Silent; English intertitles

Fruits of Passion is a lost 1919 American silent drama film directed by George Ridgwell, written (adapted) by Lillian Case Russell and starring Alice Mann and Donald Hall. Location shooting took place in the Adirondack Mountains.

== Cast ==
- Alice Mann
- Frankie Mann
- Emil De Varney
- Colin Campbell
- Philip Yale Drew
- Donald Hall
- John Lowell
- Harry Fisher
- Charles A. Robins

== Preservation ==
With no holdings located in archives, Fruits of Passion is considered a lost film.

== Bibliography ==
- Goble, Alan. The Complete Index to Literary Sources in Film. Walter de Gruyter, 1999.
