= Alice Mann (actress) =

American actor (1899–1986)

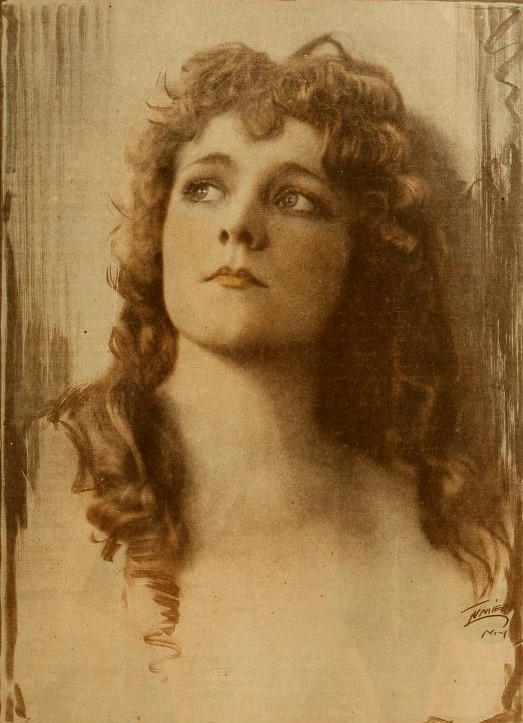
- Motion Picture Magazine, 1918
- Born: October 10, 1899; Lewistown, Mifflin County, Pennsylvania, U.S.
- Died: March 2, 1986 (aged 86); New York City, U.S.
- Occupation: Actress
- Years active: 1915–1925
- Spouse: Sidney G. Ash (m. 1921; died 1952)

Alice Mann (October 10, 1899 – March 2, 1986) was an American silent film actress.

== Biography ==
Mann began her film career in late 1915 with the Lubin Manufacturing Company, appearing in six shorts before the production company ceased operations the following year. She then moved to Vitagraph Studios, appearing in ten shorts in 1916 and 1917, many with veteran vaudeville actor Jimmy Aubrey and nine of which were directed by nascent film comedian/director Larry Semon. Roscoe Arbuckle then cast her in three of his early Comique shorts (produced by Joseph M. Schenck) made with Buster Keaton. Her best-known film appearances are with Arbuckle and Keaton in Coney Island, His Wedding Night, and Oh Doctor! when she was only 17 years of age.

When the Comique production company relocated to California in late 1917, Mann remained in the New York City metro area. In addition to Lubin, Vitagraph and the Comique Comedy Paramount film unit, she also worked with New York-based McClure Productions. She received top billing in the film drama The Water Lily, released by Triangle Pictures in 1919. and directed by George Ridgwell. Ridgwell also directed Alice and her older sister, actress Frances (Frankie) Mann, in Fruits of Passion (1919). Frankie's husband Donald Hall also appeared in the film.

Subsequent appearances include Scrambled Wives, the last movie by famed screen and stage waif Marguerite Clark. Alice Mann's film career apparently ended in 1925 and, like many early cinema actresses, she vanished into history. Only seven of her credited thirty films are known to survive. In 1921, she married Sidney G. Ash.. According to the 1940 US Census, they had two children, Sidney born 1922 and Alice born 1926. She was working as a saleslady of Cosmetics.

== Selected filmography ==
- There and Back (1916) -- extant
- Rips and Rushes (1917) -- extant
- The Third Ingredient (1917) -- presumed lost
- Worries and Wobbles (1917) -- extant
- His Wedding Night (1917) -- extant
- Oh Doctor! (1917) -- extant
- Coney Island (1917) -- extant
- A Pair of Sixes (1918) -- presumed lost
- Help! Help! Police! (1919) -- presumed lost
- The Water Lily (1919) -- extant
- Fruits of Passion (1919) -- presumed lost
- Scrambled Wives (1921) -- presumed lost
- Perjury (1921) -- presumed lost
- The Family Closet (1921)
- West of the Water Tower (1923) -- presumed lost
- Unrestrained Youth (1925) -- presumed lost

== Sources ==
- Young, Jr., Robert. Roscoe "Fatty" Arbuckle : a bio-bibliography. Westport, Conn. : Greenwood Press, 1994. ISBN 0313265372
- Nunn, William Curtis. Marguerite Clark, America's Darling of Broadway and the Silent Screen. Ft. Worth, TX: Texas Christian University Press, 1981. ISBN 978-0-912646-69-5
