= Harry Handworth =

American film director

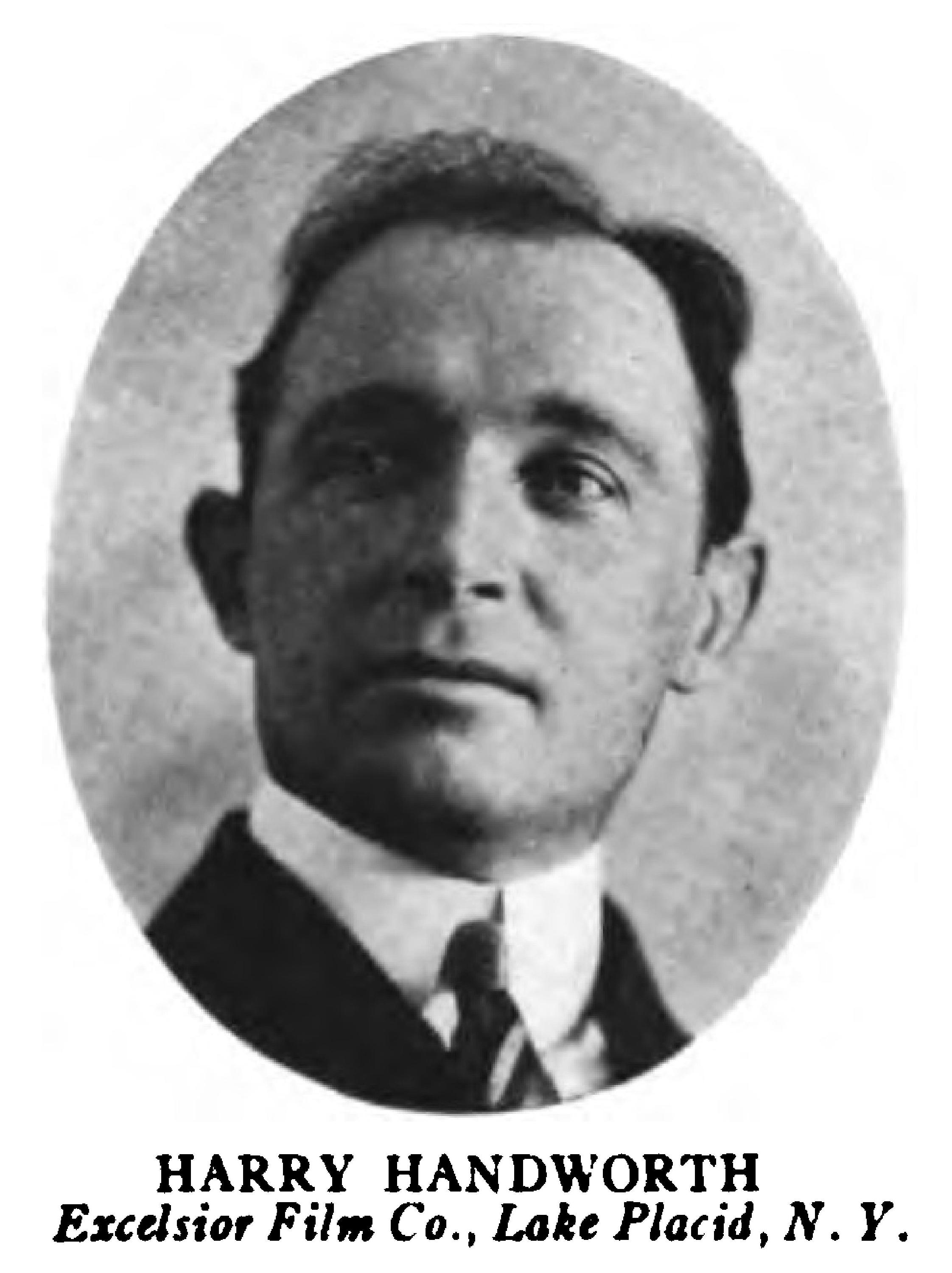
- Born: 1878; Brooklyn, New York, United States
- Died: March 22, 1916 (aged 38); Brooklyn, New York, United States
- Occupations: Film actor and director
- Years active: 1914–1916
- Spouse: Octavia Handworth (m.1905 - 1916, his death) 1 child
- Children: Elsie Handworth (1907-1994)

Harry Handworth (1878 – March 22, 1916) was a silent film actor and director from the United States.

He was the manager of the Pathe Freres and then president of Excelsior Feature Film Company. Beginning in 1914, he often worked in Lake Placid, New York and shot several films there, among them The Toll of Mammon. The film was about a fake cure for tuberculosis (the disease he died from). He also directed the play Cranberry Corners at the Lake Placid Opera House. He continued to shoot films in the Adirondack resort in 1916.

He died of tuberculosis in St. Mary's Hospital in Brooklyn in 1916.

== Selected filmography ==
- When Fate Leads Trump (1914)
- The Toll of Mammon (1914)
- Anselo Lee (1915)
- The Question (director, 1916)
- Artie, the Millionaire Kid (producer, 1916)
