= The Probation Wife =

1919 film by Sidney Franklin

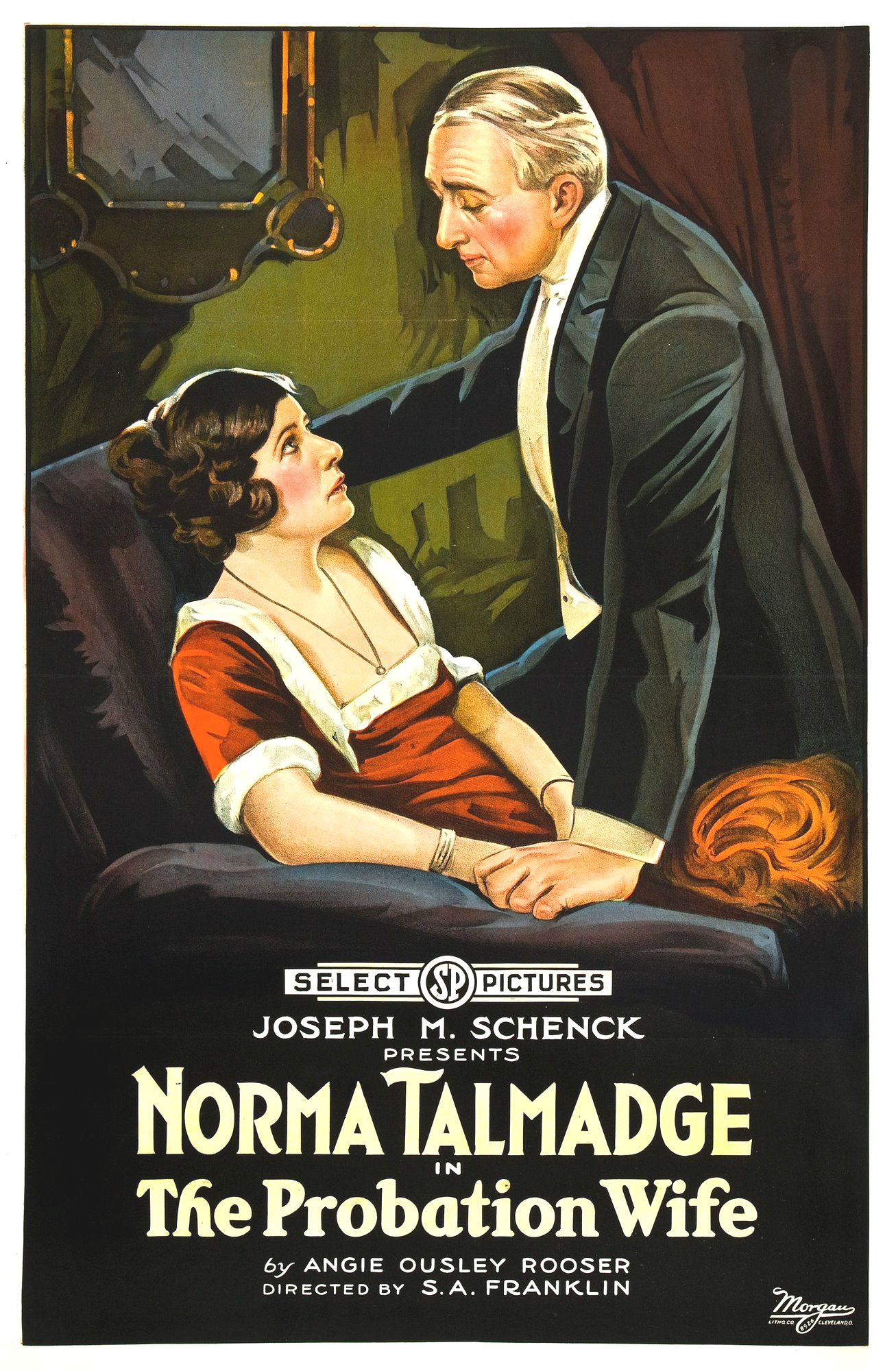
- Theatrical release poster
- Directed by: Sidney Franklin
- Written by: Angie Ousley Rooser (story); Kathryn Stuart (scenario)
- Produced by: Norma Talmadge; Joseph Schenck
- Cinematography: David Abel
- Production company: Norma Talmadge Film Corporation
- Distributed by: Select Pictures
- Release date: May 24, 1919
- Running time: 60 minutes; 5 reels
- Country: United States
- Language: Silent (English intertitles)

The Probation Wife is a 1919 American silent comedy-drama film directed by Sidney Franklin and starring Norma Talmadge. Talmadge served as her own producer with distribution through Select Pictures.

Copies of this film are held at the Library of Congress and the George Eastman House Motion Picture Collection.

== Plot ==
As described in a film magazine, novelist Harrison Wade (Meighan) goes with his fiancée and a wealthy rouge to a resort where wine and women are to be held for the asking. Disgusted with his fiancé's flirtations, he meets Jo (Talmadge), an orphan kept captive, and gives her money to escape. She fails in her attempt and is later sent to a reformatory, from which she escapes and makes her way to the city. To save her from recapture, Wade marries her, promising to divorce her when her probation is over. His former fiancé, now married to the millionaire, continues to take Wade, whom she really loves, around with her. Wade's best friend Huntley McMerton (Francis) persuades Jo to appear with him at various cafes in order to get Wade to declare that he loves her. This Wade is finally forced to do, and they then explain their scheme to him and the couple lives happily.

== Cast ==
- Norma Talmadge as Josephine Mowbray
- Thomas Meighan as Harrison Wade
- Florence Billings as Nina Stockley
- Alec B. Francis as Huntley McMerton
- Walter McEwen as Peter Marr
- Amelia Summerville as Eunice Galway
- A. Brooke as Lawyer
- S. Liston as Matron
