= Kathryn Stuart =

American screenwriter

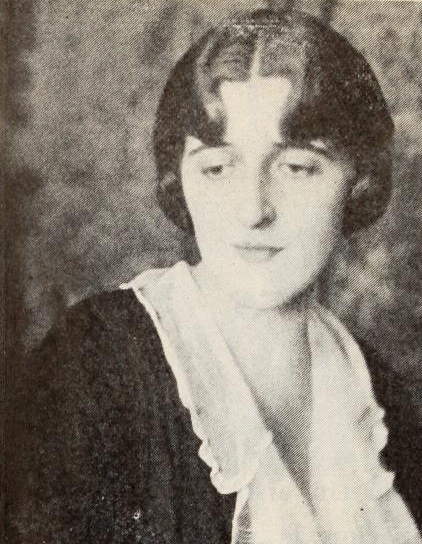
- Stuart, Wid's Year Book 1920
- Born: New Jersey, USA
- Education: Columbia University
- Occupations: Screenwriter, editor
- Years active: 1918–1922

Kathryn Stuart, sometimes credited as Katherine Stuart or Kathryne Stuart, was an American screenwriter active during Hollywood's silent era.

== Biography ==
Stuart attended Columbia University before taking up a career as a journalist and publicity woman. She resided in New York while writing screenplays and worked for Famous Players–Lasky (and later Paramount Artcraft).

== Selected filmography ==
- Timothy's Quest (1922)
- Behind Masks (1921)
- Something Different (1920)
- After Six Days (1920)
- 39 East (1920)
- Away Goes Prudence (1920)
- That Stolen Kiss (1920)
- Erstwhile Susan (1919)
- The Career of Katherine Bush (1919)
- His Bridal Night (1919)
- The Probation Wife (1919)
- The Unpardonable Sin (1919)
- Cheating Cheaters (1919)
- The Road Through the Dark (1918)
- The Savage Woman (1918)
