= Help! Help! Police! =

1919 film

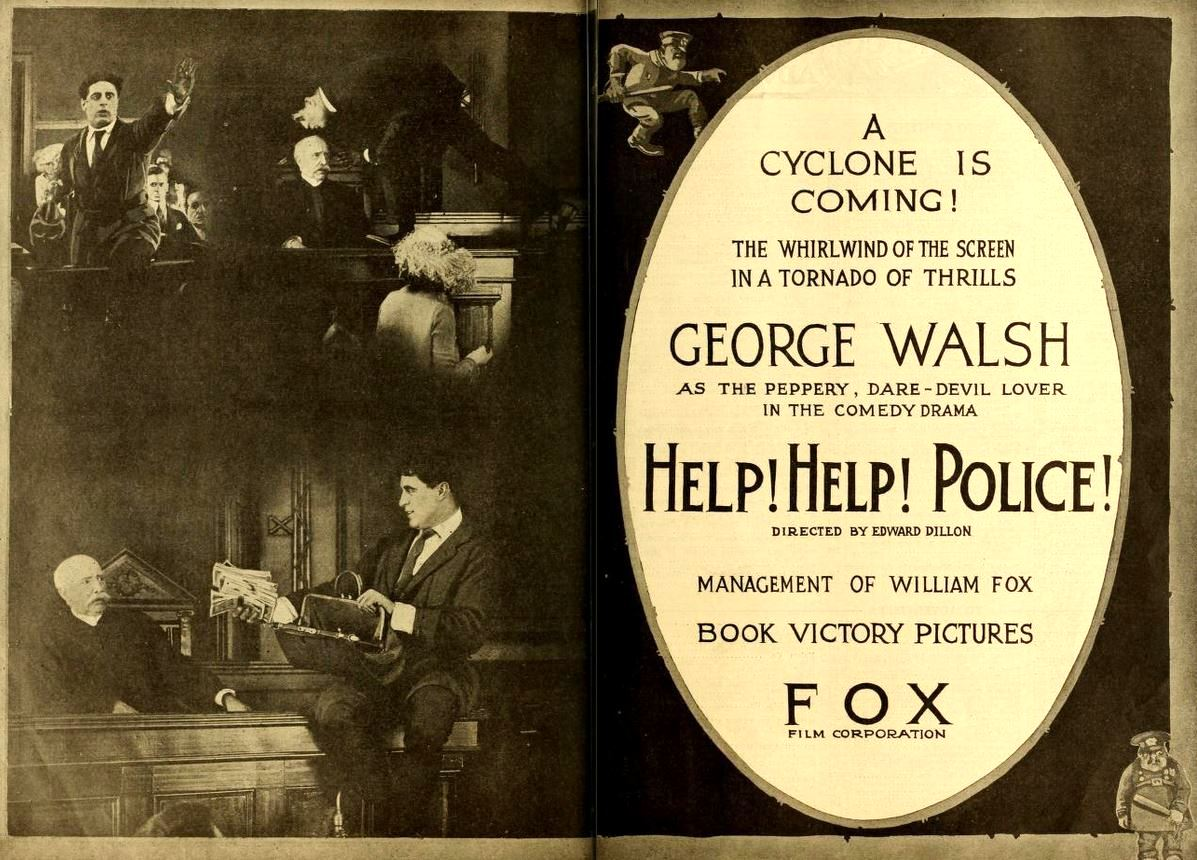
- Ad for the film from Moving Picture World (April 26, 1919)
- Directed by: Edward Dillon
- Written by: Irving McDonald; Raymond L. Schrock
- Produced by: William Fox
- Starring: George Walsh
- Distributed by: Fox Film Corporation
- Release date: April 27, 1919
- Running time: 5 reels
- Country: United States
- Languages: Silent; English intertitles

Help! Help! Police! is a lost 1919 silent American comedy film directed by Edward Dillon.

== Plot ==
As described in the film magazine Moving Picture World, George Welston (Walsh), the son of a wealthy rubber manufacturer, is staying in Palm Beach as is another rubber man, Judson Pendleton (Hallam), and his daughter Eve (Mann). The two fathers are concerned about a $100,000 rubber shipment, and are competing for it. George has been arrested twice for speeding. One night he sees a man going by the window into Eve's room, so he climbs the roof and enters. The thief sees him coming and locks himself in a closet. The house detective sees George enter and nabs him, and while they are arguing the thief escapes. Eve and her father enter her room, and her father makes the detective let George go, although he still suspects him. The thief enters another room, gags a girl who was sleeping there, and takes her jewels. A cigarette starts the room on fire. George sees the smoke and rescues the girl. While taking the unconscious girl to the hospital, he is stopped by a policeman. The girl accuses George of the robbery. A trial is set, and George's father puts up $100,000 as bail. This would keep him from getting the rubber shipment unless the thief is caught. Pendleton has also lost his $100,000 in the robbery. George gets on the trail of two thieves, and after a fight chases them in an automobile. He manages to imprison them in a van without their suspecting anything is wrong. He delivers the two thieves to court just as the hour for the start of the trial is reached. Both $100,000 are recovered, and Pendleton decides that George would make a good son-in-law.

== Cast ==
- George Walsh as George Welston
- Eric Mayne as Edward P. Welston
- Henry Hallam as Judson Pendleton
- Marie Burke as Mrs. Pendleton
- Alice Mann as Eve Pendleton
- Alan Edwards as Arthur Trask
- Evelyn Brent as Marian Trevor
- Joseph Burke as The Judge
