= Unrestrained Youth =

1925 film

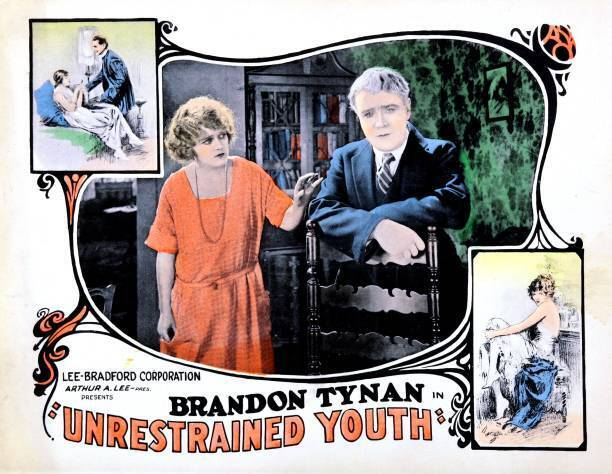
- Directed by: Joseph Levering
- Starring: Brandon Tynan; Gardner James; Alice Mann
- Distributed by: Lee-Bradford Corporation
- Release date: May 25, 1925
- Running time: 60 minutes
- Country: United States
- Languages: Silent; English intertitles

Unrestrained Youth is a 1925 American silent drama film directed by Joseph Levering and starring Brandon Tynan, Gardner James and Alice Mann.

== Cast ==
- Brandon Tynan as John Powers
- Gardner James as Jamie Powers
- Mildred Arden as Mary Powers
- Blanche Davenport as Mrs. Powers Sr.
- Jack Hopkins as Fred Whitney
- Deek Reynolds as Arthur Blake
- Alice Mann as Betty Brown
- Helen Lindroth as Mrs. Brown
- C.H. Keefe as Jerry Powers
- Charles Mcdonald as Stewart Ransom
- Thomas Brooks as Jerry Powers

== Bibliography ==
- Nash, Jay Robert. The Motion Picture Guide 1988 Annual. Cinebooks, 1997.
