= The World and His Wife =

1920 film by Robert G. Vignola

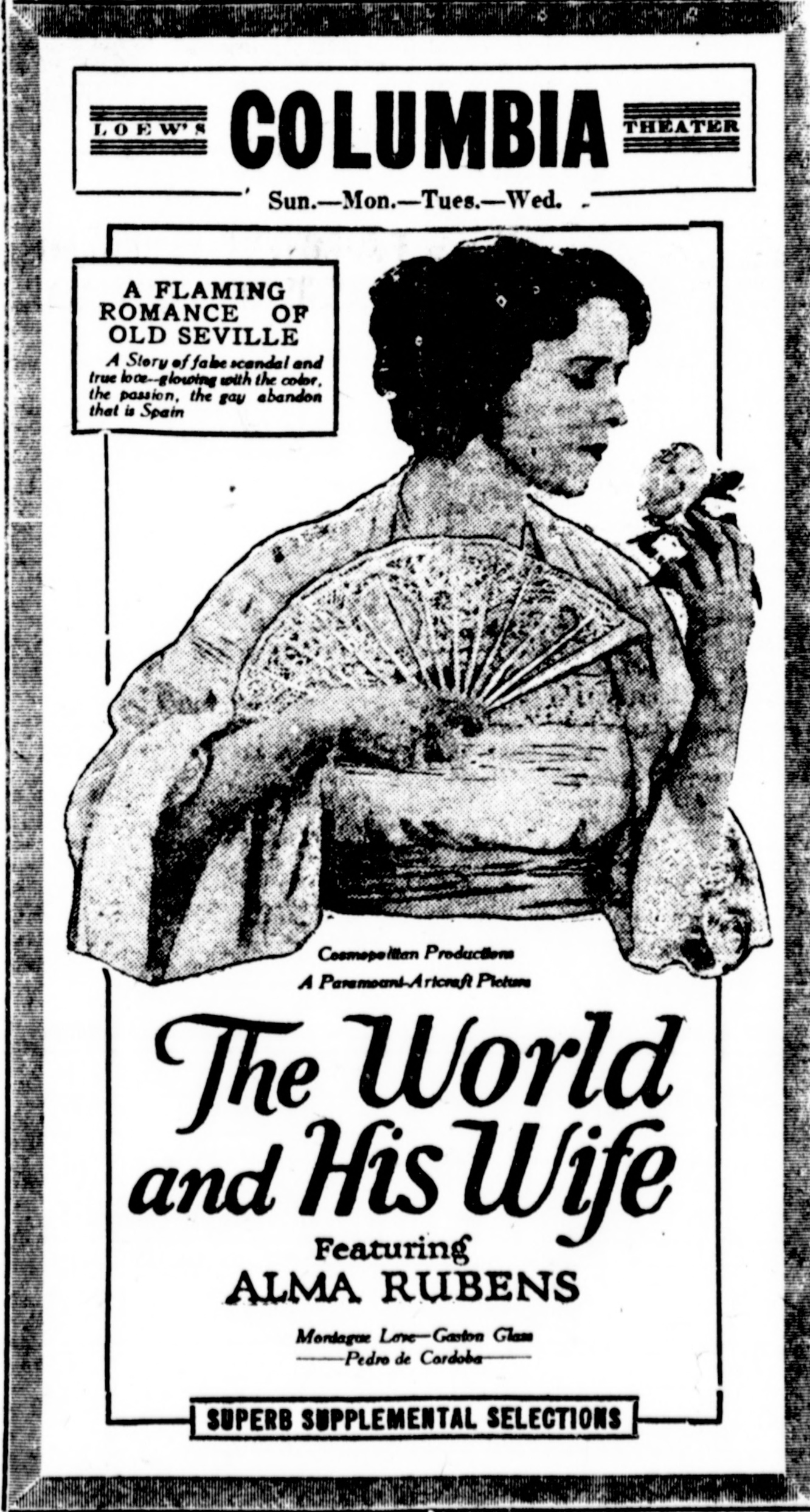
- Newspaper advertisement.
- Directed by: Robert G. Vignola
- Written by: Frances Marion (scenario); Charles Frederic Nirdlinger(English translation of play)
- Based on: El gran Galeoto by José Echegaray y Eizaguirre
- Produced by: Cosmopolitan Productions
- Cinematography: Al Liguori
- Distributed by: Paramount-Artcraft Pictures
- Release date: July 18, 1920 (United States)
- Running time: 60 mins.
- Country: United States
- Language: Silent (English intertitles)

The World and His Wife is a lost American 1920 silent drama film produced by Cosmopolitan Productions and distributed through Paramount Pictures. Directed by Robert G. Vignola, the film was based on the 1908 Broadway play of the same name by Charles Frederic Nirdlinger, which was adapted from the Spanish language play El Gran Galeoto by José Echegaray y Eizaguirre. The film stars Alma Rubens, Montagu Love, and Pedro de Cordoba and Broadway actress Margaret Dale in her feature film debut.

The story was later filmed at MGM as Lovers (1927).

== Cast ==
- Montagu Love as Don Julian
- Alma Rubens as Teodora
- Gaston Glass as Ernesto
- Pedro de Cordoba as Don Severo
- Charles K. Gerrard as Don Alvarez
- Mrs. Allen Walker as Marie
- Byron Russell as Captain Wickersham
- Peter Barbierre as Don Julian's Friend (credited as Peter Barbier)
- Pierre Gendron as Don Alvarez's Friend (credited as Leon Gendron)
- Margaret Dale as Mercedes
- Vincent Macchia as Don Alvarez's Friend
- James Savold as Ernesto's Father
- Ray Allen as Ernesto's Mother

== See also ==
- The Celebrated Scandal (1915)
- Lovers (1927)
