= On Time (film) =

1924 film by Henry Lehrman

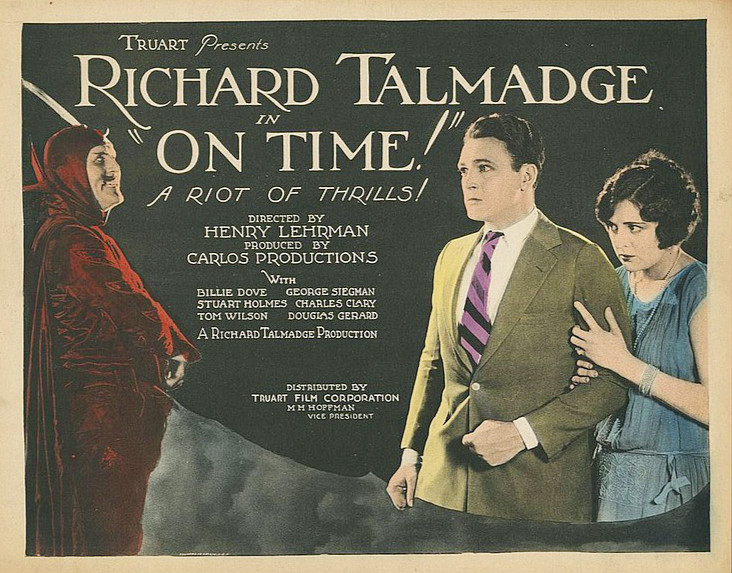
- Lobby card
- Directed by: Henry Lehrman
- Written by: Garrett Fort (scenario)
- Story by: Al Cohn
- Produced by: Carlos Productions
- Starring: Richard Talmadge; Billie Dove
- Cinematography: William Marshall
- Edited by: Ralph Spence
- Distributed by: Truart Film Corporation
- Release date: March 1, 1924
- Running time: 6 reels
- Country: United States
- Language: Silent (English intertitles)

On Time is a 1924 American silent comedy drama film directed by Henry Lehrman and starring Richard Talmadge.

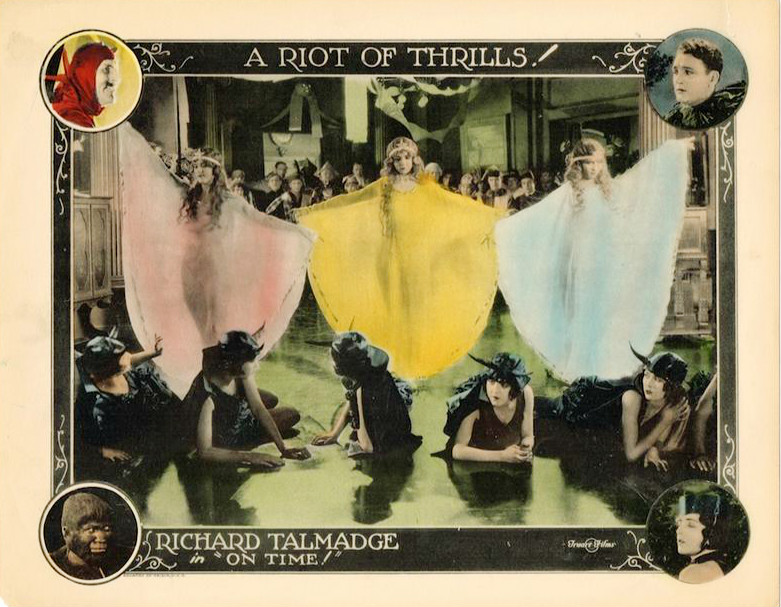
Lobby card with temple dancers

== Plot ==
As described in a film magazine review, Harry Willis, a spendthrift who has lost a fortune, promises his sweetheart Helen Hendon that he will amass another one within six months. However, by the end of that time limit, he has failed. At a Halloween party he saves some valuable antiques from being stolen by Horace Hendon. The next day he is approached by a stranger who offers him $10,000 if he will obey the instructions he is given for one day. He agrees to the offer and action immediately follows. He attempts to rescue a woman in distress and falls into the hands of insane Doctor Spinks, who tries to operate on him and remove Harry's brain so it can be implanted into an ape. Later he is mixed up in a series of exciting incidents in a Chinese temple. He is involved in many fights, and finally escapes. He later discovers that his escapades over that day have been filmed with motion picture cameras and is offered an acting contract by a film studio. He accepts and wins the affections of Helen.

== Cast ==
- Richard Talmadge as Harry Willis
- Billie Dove as Helen Hendon
- Stuart Holmes as Richard Drake
- George Siegmann as Wang Wu
- Tom Wilson as Casanova Clay
- Charles Clary as Horace Hendon
- Douglas Gerard as Mr. Black
- Fred Kirby as Dr. Spinks
- Frankie Mann as Mrs. Spinks

== Production ==
Talmadge arranged the stunts in the film, which included a dozen fight sequences. Wilson played the comic role of the valet Casanova Clay in blackface.

== Preservation ==
With no prints of On Time located in any film archives, it is a lost film.
