= Byron Russell =

Irish character actor

- Born: Patrick Joseph Russell; 17 May 1884; Clonmel, County Tipperary, Ireland
- Died: 4 September 1963 (aged 79); New York City, U.S.
- Other names: Bryson Russell
- Occupation: Actor
- Years active: 1913–1960
- Known for: Mutiny on the Bounty

Byron Russell (1884 – 1963) was an Irish character actor, best known for his performance as Quintal in the 1935 film Mutiny on the Bounty.

== Biography ==
Born in Ireland in 1884, Russell moved to the United States in 1911 where he appeared in The Quaker Girl on Broadway. He appeared on the Broadway stage until 1959, notably in the 1929 revival of Eugene O'Neill's Glencairn series of plays.

His first film appearance was in the 1920 American silent film The World and His Wife. He appeared in eleven films prior to the outbreak of World War II, often playing authority figures. After the war, Russell turned his attention to television work, appearing in numerous roles, predominantly in televised plays, between 1949 and 1960.

Russell died in 1963 in New York City.

== Filmography ==
Year	Title	Role	Notes
1920	The World and His Wife	Captain Wickersham	
1920	The Daughter Pays	Percy Ferris	
1921	The Family Closet	J. Wesley Tully	
1922	Determination	Lord Dalton	
1924	Janice Meredith	Captain. Parker	
1924	It Is the Law	Harley	
1935	Mutiny on the Bounty	Quintal	
1936	The Great Ziegfeld	Audience Member	Uncredited
1937	Parnell	Healy	
1939	...One Third of a Nation...	Insp. Castle	
