= Our Little Wife =

1918 film

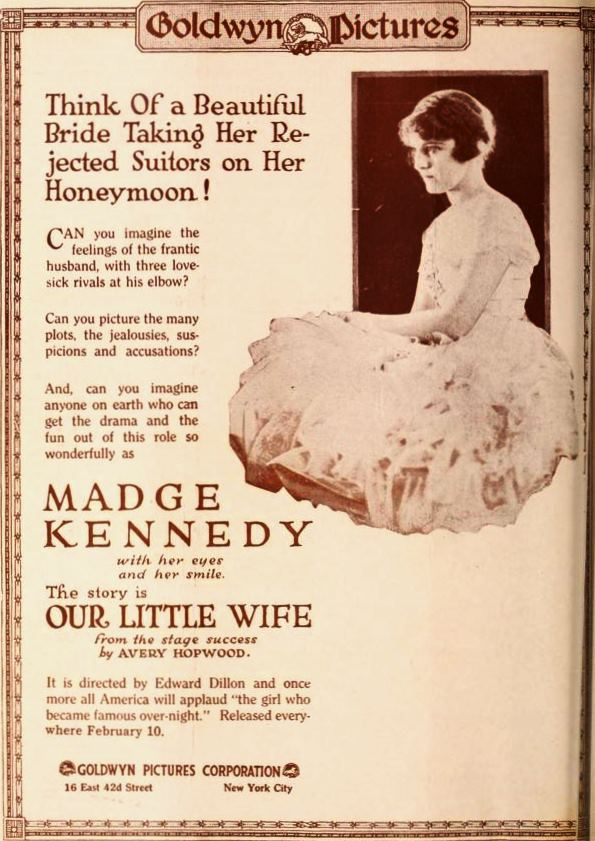
- An advertisement for the film.
- Directed by: Edward Dillon
- Based on: Our Little Wife by Avery Hopwood
- Starring: Madge Kennedy; George J. Forth; Walter Hiers
- Cinematography: George W. Hill; David Abel
- Production company: Goldwyn Pictures
- Distributed by: Goldwyn Pictures
- Release date: February 10, 1918
- Running time: 6 reels
- Country: United States
- Language: Silent (English intertitles)

Our Little Wife is a 1918 silent film directed by Edward Dillon. The film is based on the 1916 play of the same name by Avery Hopwood. It is not known whether the film currently survives.

== Plot ==
Dodo Warren is a naive and somewhat eccentric young wife. She convinces her husband Herb, although he is rather reluctant, to spend their honeymoon in Florida with three of her suitors. The three rejected suitors, Bobo Brown, Tommy Belden and Dr. Elliott, thus tag along with the two newlyweds, soon generating a series of misunderstandings. Like when Dodo is caught by her husband with Elliott even though the young woman then manages to convince Herb of her innocence.

The following year, Dodo plots to save the relationship between Bobo Brown and his new girlfriend, Angie Martin. The two have argued and Dodo shows up at a party with Bobo, who she wants to introduce to Angie to make peace. But the girl does not attend the party and it ends up that Dodo finds herself locked in the apartment with a man who is not her husband. She will have to convince Herb again and, this time, she will have to promise him, for the future, not to look at other men anymore.

== Cast ==
- Madge Kennedy as Dodo Warren
- George J. Forth as Herb Warren
- Walter Hiers as Bobo Brown
- William Davidson as Doctor Elliot
- Kempton Greene as Tommy Belden
- Marguerite Marsh as Angie Martin
- Wray Page as Mrs. Elliot
