= Donald Hall (actor) =

British-American actor

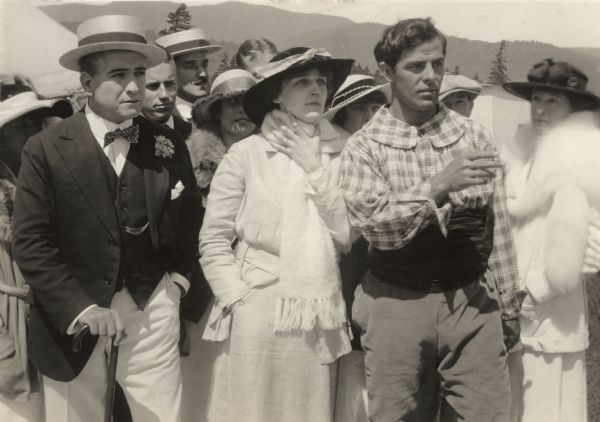
- Hall (left) in the 1915 film Anselo Lee
- Born: 14 August 1867; Morree, North-Western Provinces, British India
- Died: 25 July 1948 (aged 80); Los Angeles, California, United States
- Occupation: Actor
- Years active: 1911–1943 (film)

Donald Hall (14 August 1867 – 25 July 1948) was a British-American film actor of the silent era. He was married to the actress Frankie Mann and was brother-in-law to Alice Mann. He appeared in a number of Vitagraph Studios films during the 1910s. He also appeared in films produced by Triangle, Goldwyn, Selznick and Paramount Pictures. Following the introduction of sound he made only a few uncredited appearances.

== Selected filmography ==
- Mr. Barnes of New York (1914)
- The Christian (1914)
- Anselo Lee (1915)
- Mortmain (1915)
- Playing Dead (1915)
- Mrs. Dane's Danger (1916)
- The Law Decides (1916)
- Salvation Joan (1916)
- The Sex Lure (1916)
- Hesper of the Mountains (1916)
- The Scarlet Runner (1916)
- The On-the-Square Girl (1917)
- The Awakening of Ruth (1917)
- The Moth (1917)
- The Raggedy Queen (1917)
- Alias Mrs. Jessop (1917)
- The Face in the Dark (1918)
- The Great Adventure (1918)
- The Carter Case (1919)
- The Water Lily (1919)
- Love and the Woman (1919)
- The Chosen Path (1919)
- The Broken Melody (1919)
- Fruits of Passion (1919)
- The Great Shadow (1920)
- A Woman's Business (1920)
- The Greatest Love (1920)
- In the Shadow of the Dome (1920)
- A Woman's Woman (1922)
- The Last Moment (1923)
- Unguarded Women (1924)
- Her Love Story (1924)
- The Spirit of Youth (1929)
- Oh, For a Man! (1930)
- Clive of India (1935)
- San Francisco (1936)
- Stop, Look and Love (1939)
- Government Girl (1943)

== Bibliography ==
- Goble, Alan. The Complete Index to Literary Sources in Film. Walter de Gruyter, 1999. ISBN 978-1-85739-229-6.
