= Anselo Lee =

1915 silent film

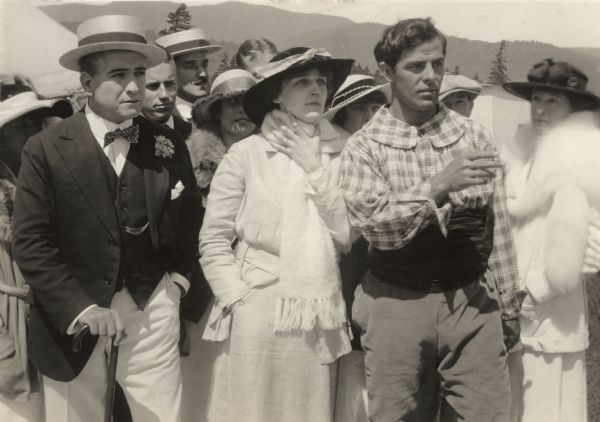
- Directed by: Harry Handworth
- Written by: Paul Kester
- Starring: Antonio Moreno; Naomi Childers; Donald Hall
- Production company: Vitagraph Company of America
- Distributed by: General Film Company
- Release date: November 6, 1915
- Running time: 30 minutes
- Country: United States
- Languages: Silent; English intertitles

Anselo Lee is a 1915 American silent drama film directed by Harry Handworth and starring Antonio Moreno, Naomi Childers and Donald Hall.

== Cast ==
- Antonio Moreno as Anselo Lee
- Naomi Childers as Gertrude Carlton
- Donald Hall as Van Buren
- Nellie Anderson as Old Mrs. Lee
- Billie Billings as Mrs. Carlton
- Frankie Mann

== Bibliography ==
- George A. Katchmer. Eighty Silent Film Stars: Biographies and Filmographies of the Obscure to the Well Known. McFarland, 1991.
