= His Wedding Night =

1917 film

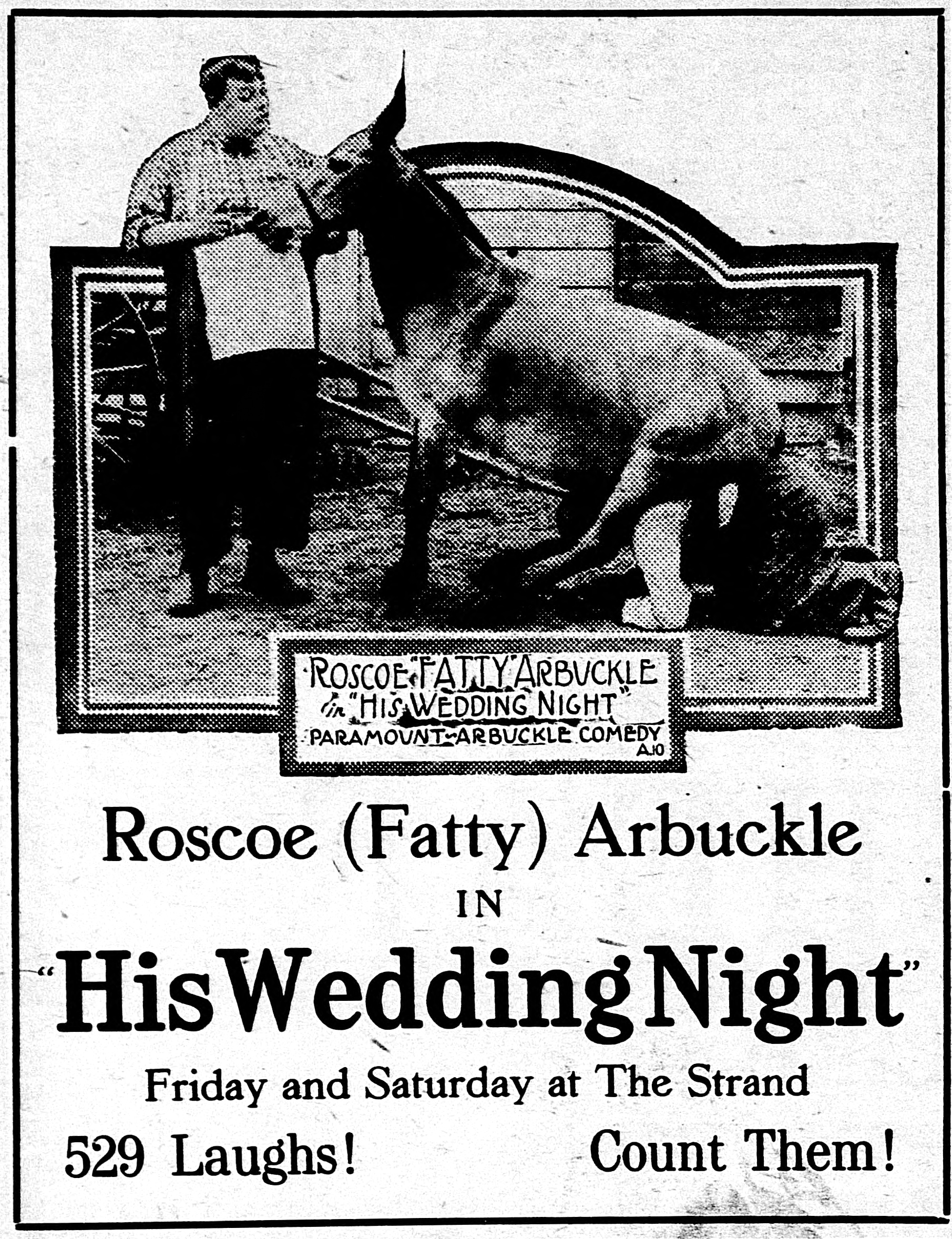
- Advertisement for the film
- Directed by: Roscoe Arbuckle
- Written by: Roscoe Arbuckle; Joseph Anthony Roach
- Starring: Roscoe Arbuckle; Al St. John; Buster Keaton
- Cinematography: George Peters
- Edited by: Herbert Warren
- Production company: Comique Film Company
- Distributed by: Paramount Pictures
- Release date: August 20, 1917
- Running time: 19 minutes
- Country: United States
- Language: Silent (English intertitles)

His Wedding Night is a 1917 American two-reel silent comedy film written, directed by, and starring Roscoe "Fatty" Arbuckle.

== Plot ==
His Wedding Night (1917)

A lazy and dishonest store clerk who gets into various slap-stick situations, such as drugging customers with chloroform-laced perfume and tussling with a donkey. He proposes to his boss's daughter, Alice, but faces competition from another employee, Rival Suitor. When Alice spurns his proposal, chaos ensues. Later, in a ploy to kidnap Alice and force her to marry him, he accidentally rides off with the delivery boy. Unaware of the mix-up, soda clerk attempts to rescue her, nearly paying a justice of the peace to wed him to the delivery boy in the process. The film concludes with soda clerk marrying Alice, then drugging the justice of the peace with the chloroform-laced perfume to recover his money.

== Cast ==
Lobby card

- Roscoe "Fatty" Arbuckle as Drugstore soda clerk
- Al St. John as Rival Suitor
- Buster Keaton as Delivery Boy
- Alice Mann as Alice
- Arthur Earle
- Jimmy Bryant
- Josephine Stevens as Lady Customer
- Alice Lake
- Natalie Talmadge as Pretty lady in the car (uncredited)

== See also ==
- Roscoe Arbuckle filmography
- Buster Keaton filmography
