= Behind Masks =

1921 film

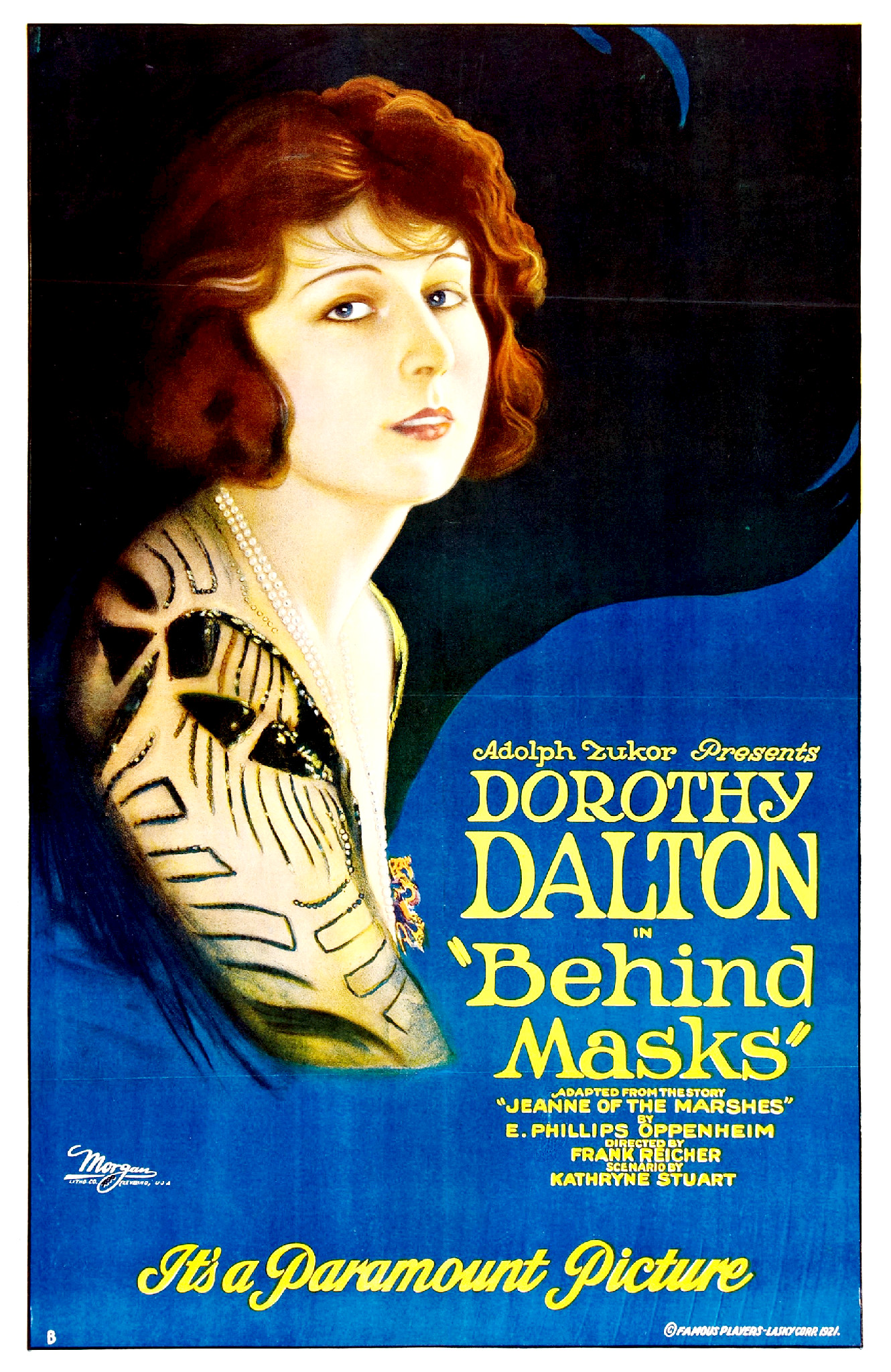
- Theatrical release poster
- Directed by: Frank Reicher
- Screenplay by: Kathryn Stuart
- Based on: Jeanne of the Marshes (novel) by E. Phillips Oppenheim
- Produced by: Adolph Zukor
- Starring: Dorothy Dalton; Frederick Vogeding; William P. Carleton; Julia Swayne Gordon; Gladys Valerie; Kempton Greene
- Cinematography: Gilbert Warrenton
- Production company: Famous Players–Lasky Corporation
- Distributed by: Paramount Pictures
- Release date: July 24, 1921
- Running time: 50 minutes
- Country: United States
- Language: Silent (English intertitles)

Behind Masks is a 1921 American silent drama film directed by Frank Reicher. It was written by Kathryn Stuart based upon the 1909 novel Jeanne of the Marshes by E. Phillips Oppenheim. The film stars Dorothy Dalton, Frederick Vogeding, William P. Carleton, Julia Swayne Gordon, Gladys Valerie, and Kempton Greene. The film was released on July 24, 1921, by Paramount Pictures.

A copy of the film is in the Library of Congress, but is incomplete.

== Cast ==
- Dorothy Dalton as Jeanne Mesurier
- Frederick Vogeding as Andrew Bourne
- William P. Carleton as Major Nigel Forrest
- Julia Swayne Gordon as Madame Ena Delore
- Gladys Valerie as Kate Cansard
- Kempton Greene as Cecil Bourne
- Lewis Broughton as Ronald Engleton
- Alex Kaufman as Maurice Bresnault
