= Shadows of the Sea =

1922 film

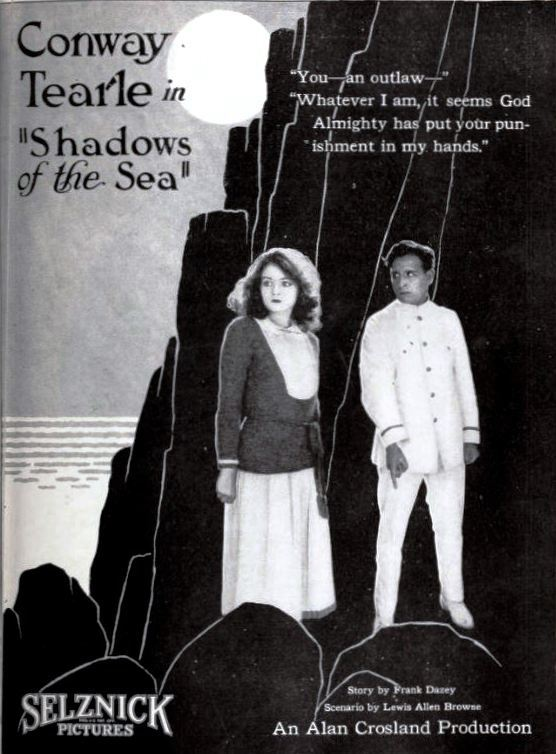
- Advertisement
- Directed by: Alan Crosland
- Written by: Frank Mitchell Dazey; Lewis Allen Browne
- Produced by: Lewis J. Selznick
- Starring: Conway Tearle; Doris Kenyon; Crauford Kent
- Cinematography: Jacob A. Badaracco; Jules Cronjager
- Production company: Selznick Pictures
- Distributed by: Select Pictures
- Release date: January 10, 1922
- Running time: 55 minutes
- Country: United States
- Language: Silent (English intertitles)

Shadows of the Sea is a lost 1922 American silent thriller film directed by Alan Crosland and starring Conway Tearle, Doris Kenyon, and Crauford Kent.

== Cast ==
- Conway Tearle as Captain Dick Carson
- Doris Kenyon as Dorothy Jordan
- Jack Drumier as Shivering Sam
- Crauford Kent as Andrews
- Arthur Housman as Ralph Dean
- J. Barney Sherry as Dr. Jordan
- Frankie Mann as Molly
- Harry J. Lane as 'Red'
- William Nally as Captain Hobbs

== Reception ==
Variety gave a moderately positive review, finding the story to be "strongly resembling a dime novel type of story" but found the acting and production to be satisfactory.

== Bibliography ==
- Monaco, James. The Encyclopedia of Film. Perigee Books, 1991.
