= The Raggedy Queen =

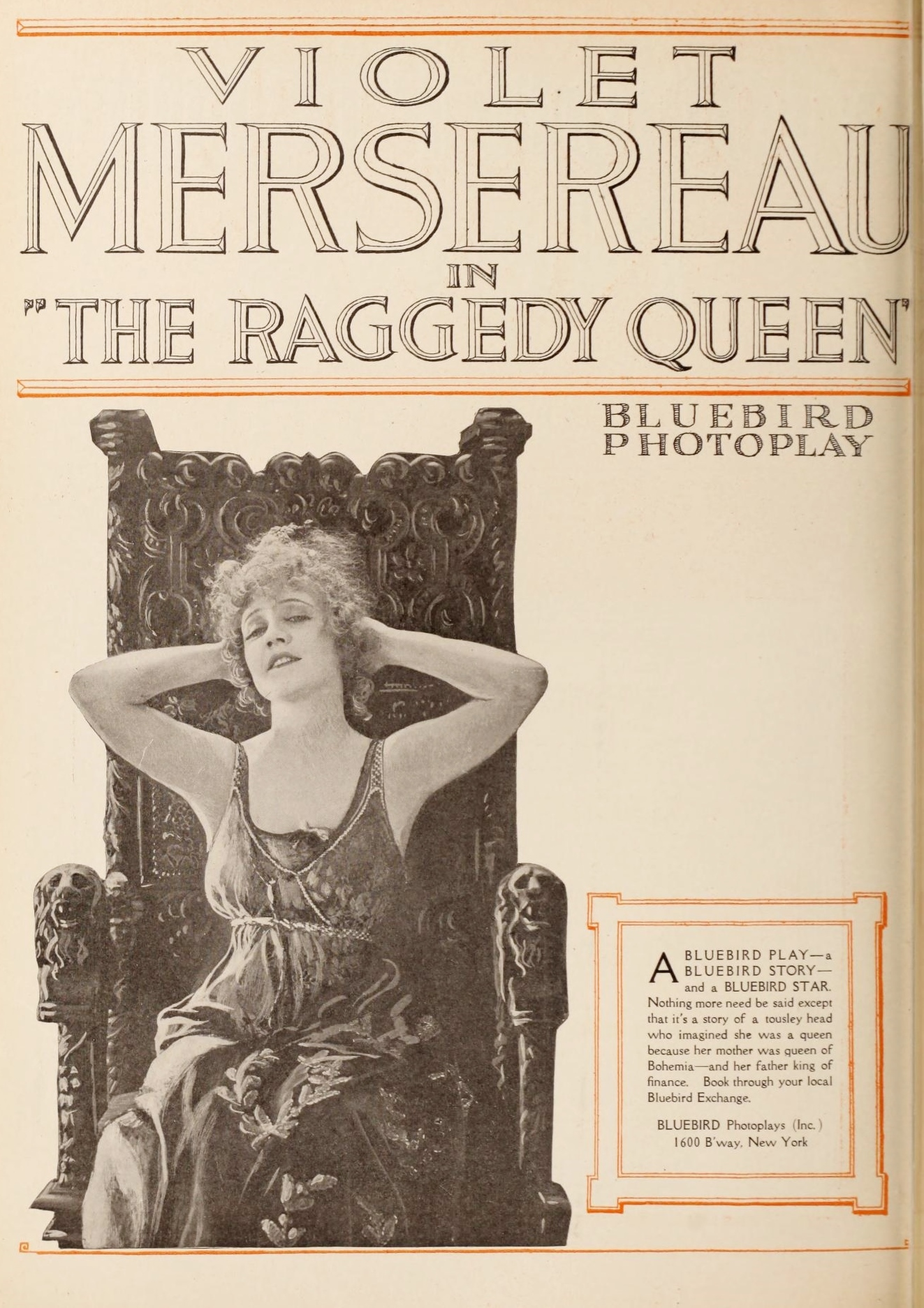
- Directed by: Theodore Marston
- Written by: John C. Brownell
- Starring: Violet Mersereau; Grace Barton; Donald Hall
- Production company: Universal Pictures
- Distributed by: Universal Pictures
- Release date: December 3, 1917
- Running time: 50 minutes
- Country: United States
- Languages: Silent; English intertitles

The Raggedy Queen is a 1917 American silent drama film directed by Theodore Marston and starring Violet Mersereau, Grace Barton and Donald Hall.

== Cast ==
- Violet Mersereau as Tatters
- Grace Barton as Crazy Anne
- Donald Hall as Hugh Tillson
- Robert F. Hill as Tom Brennon
- Charles Slattery as Lem Braxton
- James O'Neill as Father Andre
- Frank Otto as David Grant

== Bibliography ==
- Robert B. Connelly. The Silents: Silent Feature Films, 1910-36, Volume 40, Issue 2. December Press, 1998.
