= The Third Ingredient =

- Short story by O. Henry
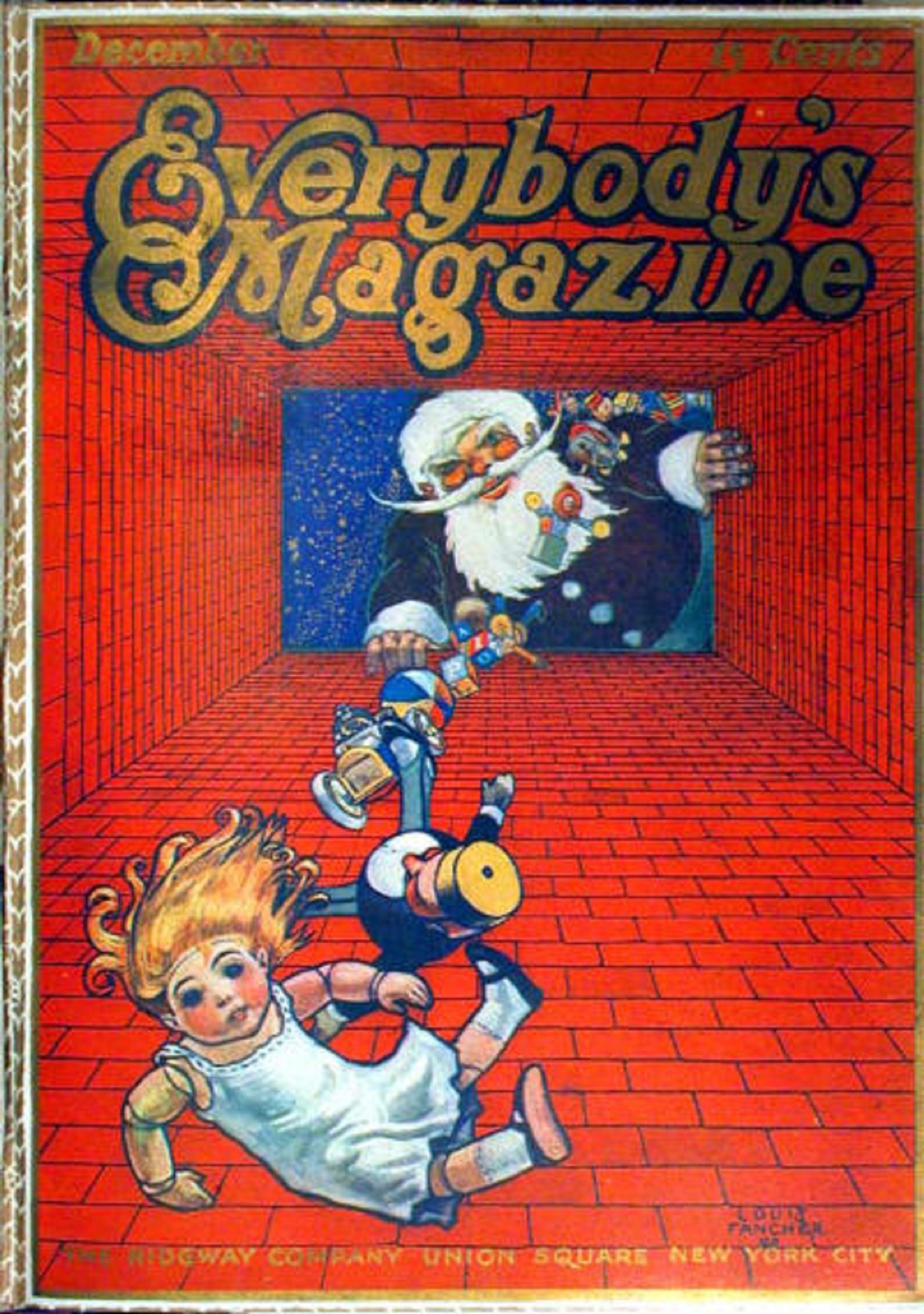
- Country: United States
- Language: English
- Genre: Short story

Publication
- Published in: Everybody's Magazine
- Publisher: The Ridgway Company
- Publication date: December, 1908

"The Third Ingredient" is a short story by O. Henry, notable for its ironic take on the "Stone Soup" theme. The story was originally published in the December 1908 issue of Everybody's Magazine with illustrations by Frederic Dorr Steele. The next year it was included in O. Henry's collection Options.

== Background ==
As reported by O. Henry's good friend and biographer C. Alphonso Smith, The Third Ingredient was inspired by a real experience:

... in one of his first months in New York he was living in very humble lodgings and one evening found him without funds. He became so hungry that he could not finish the story on which he was working, and he walked up and down the landing between the rooms. The odor of cooking in one of the rooms increased his pangs, and he was beside himself when the door opened and a young girl said to him, "Have you had your supper? I've made hazlett stew and it's too much for me. It won't keep, so come and help me eat it."

He was grateful for the invitation and partook of the stew which, she told him, was made from the liver, kidneys, and heart of a calf. The girl was a feather curler and, during the meal, she explained her work and showed him the peculiar kind of dull blade which was used in it. A few days later he rapped at her door to ask her to a more substantial dinner, but he found that she had gone and left no address.

It is possible that O. Henry arrived at his final composition independently of the Stone Soup tradition. Unlike many other examples, it does not involve an element of trickery. Instead, the emphasis is on companionship: it may be argued that the "third ingredient" is heart (as it is literally in Smith's description above), which could explain the departure from tradition.

== Plot summary ==
The story follows Hetty Pepper, a lower-class woman who has lost her job at a department store. Bargaining with a rib of beef (her last bit of food) she befriends a neighbor and a love interest, who donate ingredients for a stew greater than the sum of its parts. Early in the story the waggish narrator remarks, "You can make oyster soup without oysters, turtle soup without turtles, coffee-cake without coffee, but you can't make beef stew without potatoes and onions," casting the beef rib in much the same role as the stone in "Stone Soup".

== Adaptations ==
- The two-reel silent film, The Third Ingredient (1917), is adapted from the short story.
- It has been made into a kinetic novel in English and Russian.
