= One Exciting Night (1922 film) =

1922 film by D. W. Griffith

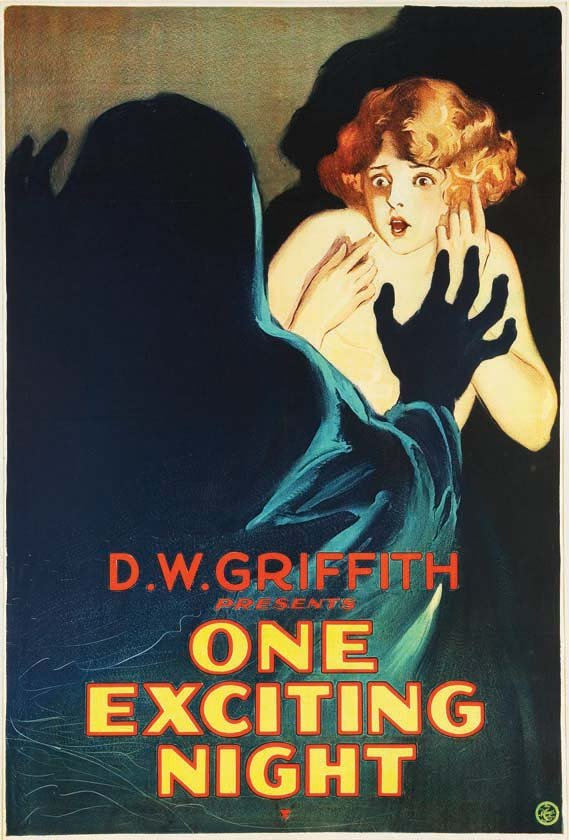
- Theatrical release poster
- Directed by: D. W. Griffith
- Written by: D. W. Griffith (as Irene Sinclair)
- Produced by: D. W. Griffith
- Starring: Carol Dempster; Henry Hull; Morgan Wallace; Margaret Dale; Porter Strong
- Cinematography: Irving B. Ruby; Hendrik Sartov
- Production company: D.W. Griffith Productions
- Distributed by: United Artists
- Release date: October 2, 1922
- Running time: 128 minutes
- Country: United States
- Language: Silent (English intertitles)
- Budget: $362,000
- Box office: $1,150,000

One Exciting Night (1922)

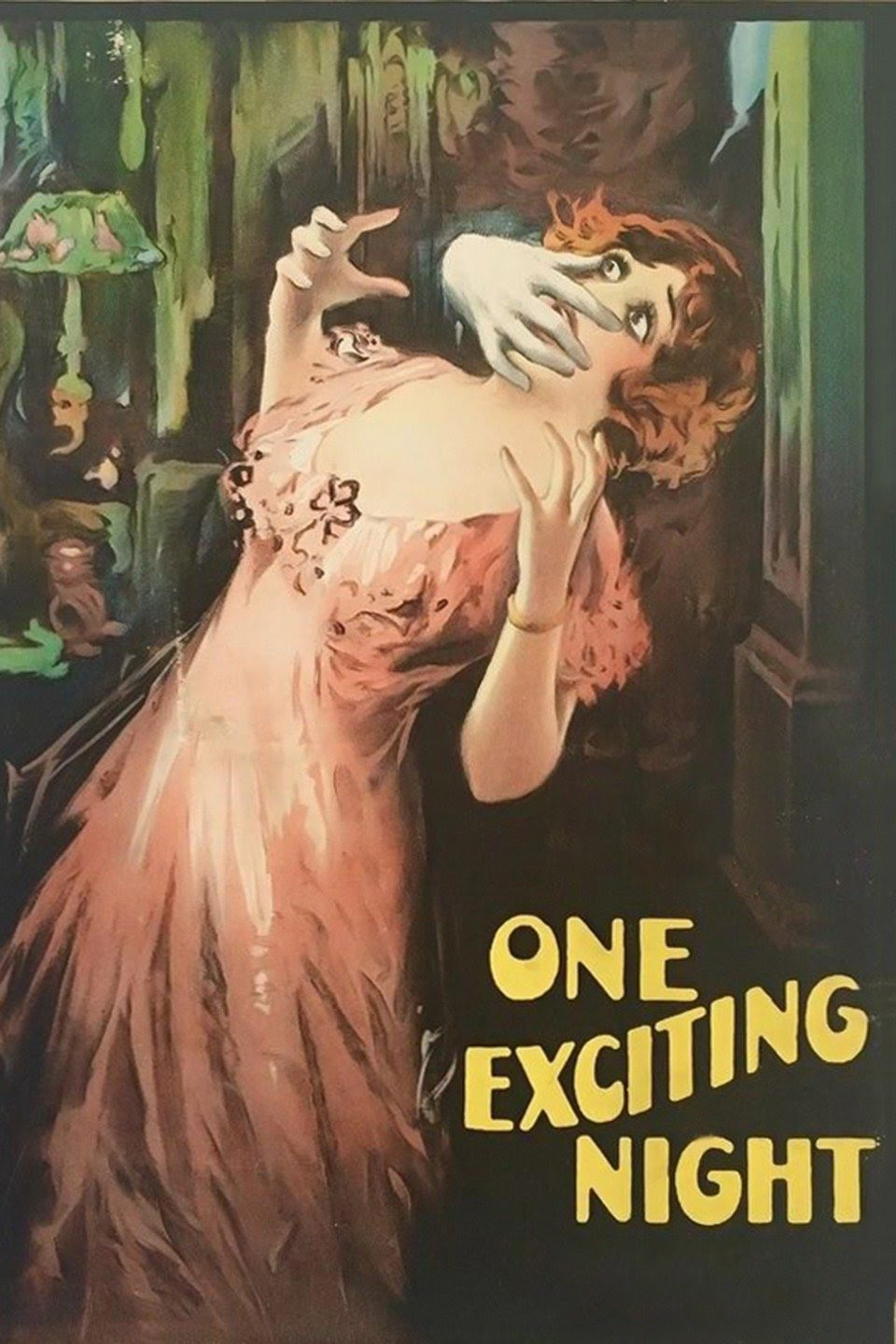
alt. lobby poster for theaters

One Exciting Night is a 1922 American Gothic silent mystery film directed by D. W. Griffith.

The plot revolves around a series of murders on a wealthy estate and the attempts of the cast to uncover the murderer's identity. The success of both the Mary Roberts Rinehart and Avery Hopwood play The Bat (1920), as well as the 1922 stage play The Cat and the Canary, led Griffith to write and produce his own variation on the theme.

At the time of this film, Henry Hull was starring on Broadway in the stage version of John Willard's The Cat and the Canary.

== Plot ==
Agnes Harrington's uncle separates her from her family in Africa when her wealthy father dies, so that he won't have to share his brother's fortune with the child. Years later on his deathbed, he sees to it that Agnes is restored to her rightful place in society, cutting his own son John Fairfax out of the chain of inheritance in the process.

John, Agnes and a number of other people gather at a social event at the famous Fairfax Estate, unaware that it is being used by a gang of bootleggers, and that a hidden treasure is concealed somewhere on the grounds. To make matters worse, a creepy madman is stalking the grounds, and one by one people start turning up dead.

== Cast ==
- Carol Dempster as Agnes Harrington
- Henry Hull as John Fairfax
- Morgan Wallace as J. Wilson Rockmaine
- Margaret Dale as Mrs. Harrington
- Charles Emmett Mack as a guest
- Charles Croker-King as the neighbor
- Porter Strong as Romeo Washington
- Frank Sheridan as detective
- Frank Wunderlee as Samuel Jones
- Grace Griswold as Auntie Fairfax
- Irma Harrison as the maid
- Herbert Sutch as Clary Johnson
- Percy Carr as the butler
- Mary Astor as young mother in Africa (bit, uncredited)..(unconfirmed!)

== Production ==
One Exciting Night saw an underwhelming response at test screenings. Director D. W. Griffith decided that the problem was that the film lacked the spectacular climax audiences had come to expect from his films, so he reassembled the cast and shot a new ending involving a terrifying storm, using a combination of real hurricane footage which he had shot earlier and studio footage filmed with special effects.

== Home media ==
This film received a brief release on VHS in the 1990s. In March 2014 the film was released on all-region DVD by Alpha Video.
