= 39 East (film) =

1920 film by John S. Robertson

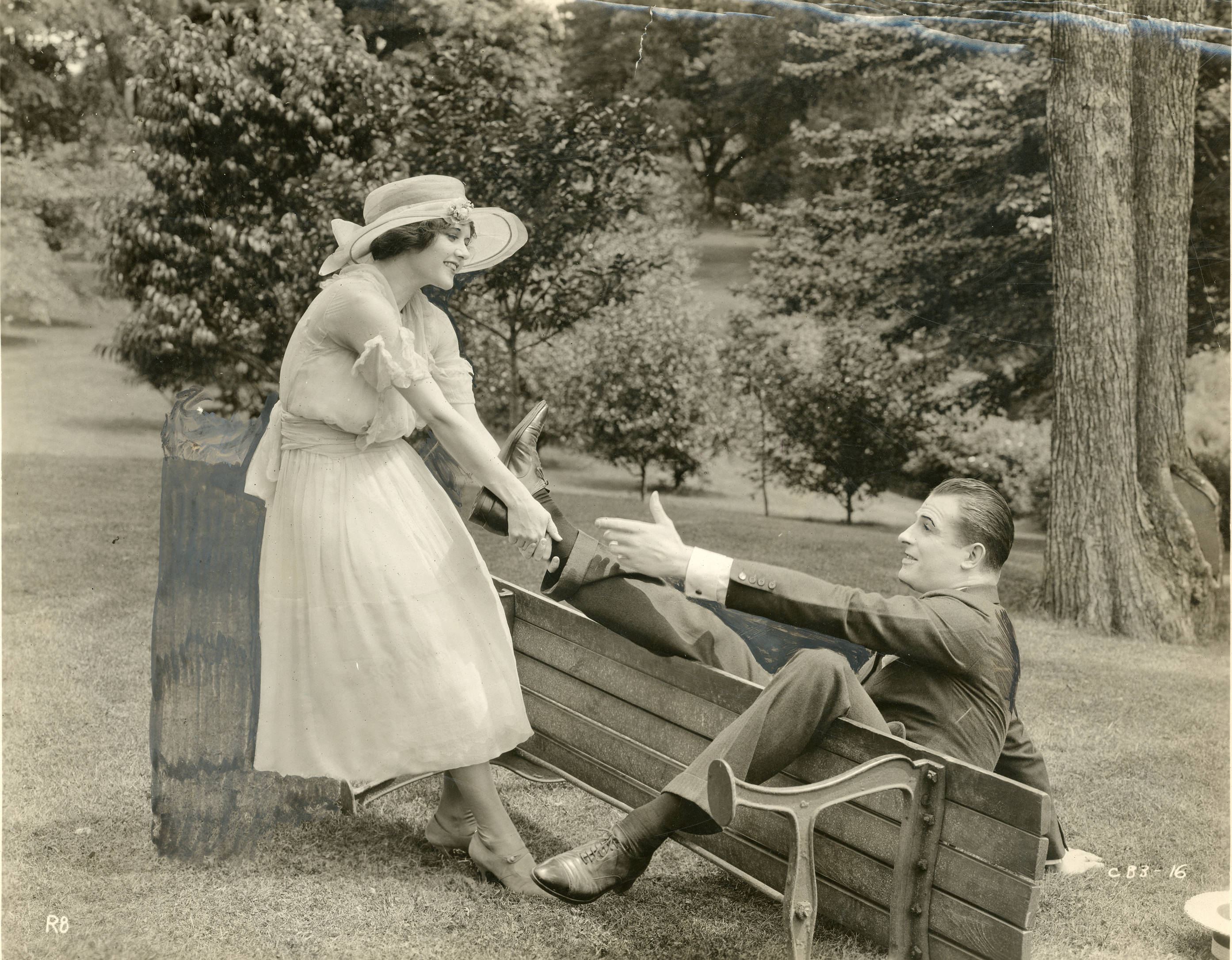
- Constance Binney and Reginald Denny in 39 East
- Directed by: John S. Robertson
- Written by: Kathryn Stuart (scenario)
- Based on: 39 East by Rachel Crothers
- Starring: Constance Binney; Reginald Denny; Alison Skipworth
- Cinematography: Roy Overbaugh
- Distributed by: Realart Pictures
- Release date: September 1920
- Running time: 50 minutes
- Country: United States
- Language: Silent (English intertitles)

39 East is a lost 1920 American silent comedy film produced by the Realart Picture Company (headed by Paramount Pictures's Adolph Zukor), and starring Constance Binney reprising her role from the Broadway play. The film was directed by John S. Robertson.

The film is based on the 1919 Broadway play of the same name by Rachel Crothers, which was a hit on Broadway with Binney starring.

== Plot ==
As described in a film magazine, Penelope Penn, to financially aid others of the poor minister's family to which she belongs, goes to New York City and becomes one of the boardinghouse colony at "39 East." The identity of her business she keeps a mystery, thereby arousing the unsympathetic speculations of her fellow female boarders. She finds a champion and lover in Napoleon Gibbs Jr., a young wealthy aristocrat, who helps her over many a rough spot during her boardinghouse life. Her chance to shine histrionically comes when there is a sudden refusal of the theater star, to whom she understudies, to go on while she is in the chorus. Penelope's success assures her family's future and brings the climax of her romance, which promises a "happy ever after" ending.

== Cast ==
- Constance Binney as Penelope Penn
- Reginald Denny as Napoleon Gibbs Jr.
- Alison Skipworth as Mrs. de Mailly
- Lucia Moore as Mrs. Smith
- Blanche Frederici as Miss McMasters
- Edith Gresham as Sadie Clarence
- Mildred Arden as Myrtle Clarence
- Luis Alberni as Count Gionelli
- Albert Carroll as Dr. Hubbard
- Frank Allworth as Timothy O'Brien

== Production ==
While she was still starring in the stage version of 39 East, Constance Binney signed a three-year contract with Famous Players-Lasky, appearing in Erstwhile Susan and The Stolen Kiss before reprising her role in 39 East. Outbidding Goldwyn Pictures, Famous Players-Lasky purchased the film rights to 39 East from the Shuberts for $30,000.

Filming began in late June 1920 and wrapped by mid-August 1920, where the final scenes for the film were shot on location at the International Theatre (then known as the Park Theatre).

== Preservation ==
With no holdings located in archives, 39 East is considered a lost film.
