= Such a Little Queen =

Such a Little Queen may refer to:

- Such a Little Queen (1914 film), a 1914 silent film starring Mary Pickford
- Such a Little Queen (1921 film), a 1921 silent film starring Constance Binney
