= Room and board (disambiguation) =

Room and board is a way of compensating a person for their work.

Room and board may also refer to:

- Room and Board (film), a 1921 American silent film starring Constance Binney
- Room and Board (comic strip), a comic strip by Gene Ahern
