= Israel Kleiner (biochemist) =

American biochemist

Israel Simon Kleiner (April 8, 1885 – June 15, 1966) was a biochemist whose work helped lead to the discovery of insulin.

Kleiner's grandparents Israel and Eva (Meyer) were Jews who came to America from Bavaria, Germany, in 1848. Born in New Haven, Connecticut, Kleiner was a member of the Congregation Mishkan Israel temple, where his uncle, city council member Charles Kleiner was president.

Kleiner received his Ph.D. in biochemistry at Yale in 1909. From 1910, he worked as an assistant in physiology at the Rockefeller Institute until 1914, when he became an associate. In 1919 he was appointed as professor at the New York Homeopathic Medical College (later to become New York Medical College). Here he served as acting dean in 1921 and then as dean from 1922 to 1925. In 1935 he became professor of biochemistry, and from 1948 was the director of the department of biochemistry.

On February 10, 1959, Kleiner was awarded the third annual Van Slyke award in Clinical Chemistry, at the New York Academy of Sciences.

He was buried near his grandparents at the Congregation Mishkan Israel cemetery, in New Haven, Connecticut.

== Insulin ==
In 1919, at the Rockefeller Institute, Kleiner was one of the first to demonstrate the effect of extracts from the pancreas on animals, causing hypoglycemia. These were the early efforts which eventually helped lead to the discovery of insulin.
