= Somewhere in America =

Somewhere in America may refer to:

- Somewhere in America (film), 1917 silent film
- "Somewhere in America" (song), by Survivor
- Somewhere in America, 2001 album by Dynamite Boy
- "Somewhere in America", song by Jay-Z from his album Magna Carta Holy Grail (2013)
