= Thomas Carrigan =

American Silent Film Actor

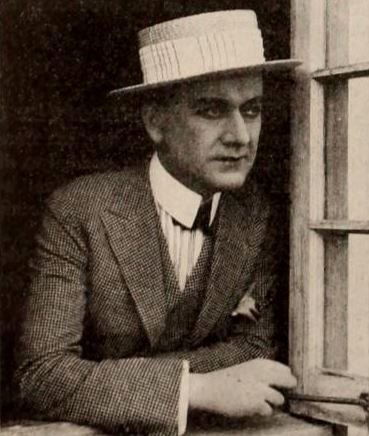
- Carrigan in a still from Checkers, 1919
- Born: 13 April 1886; Lapeer, Michigan, United States
- Died: 2 October 1941 (aged 55); Lapeer, Michigan, United States
- Occupation: Actor
- Years active: 1911–1932
- Spouse: Mabel Taliaferro

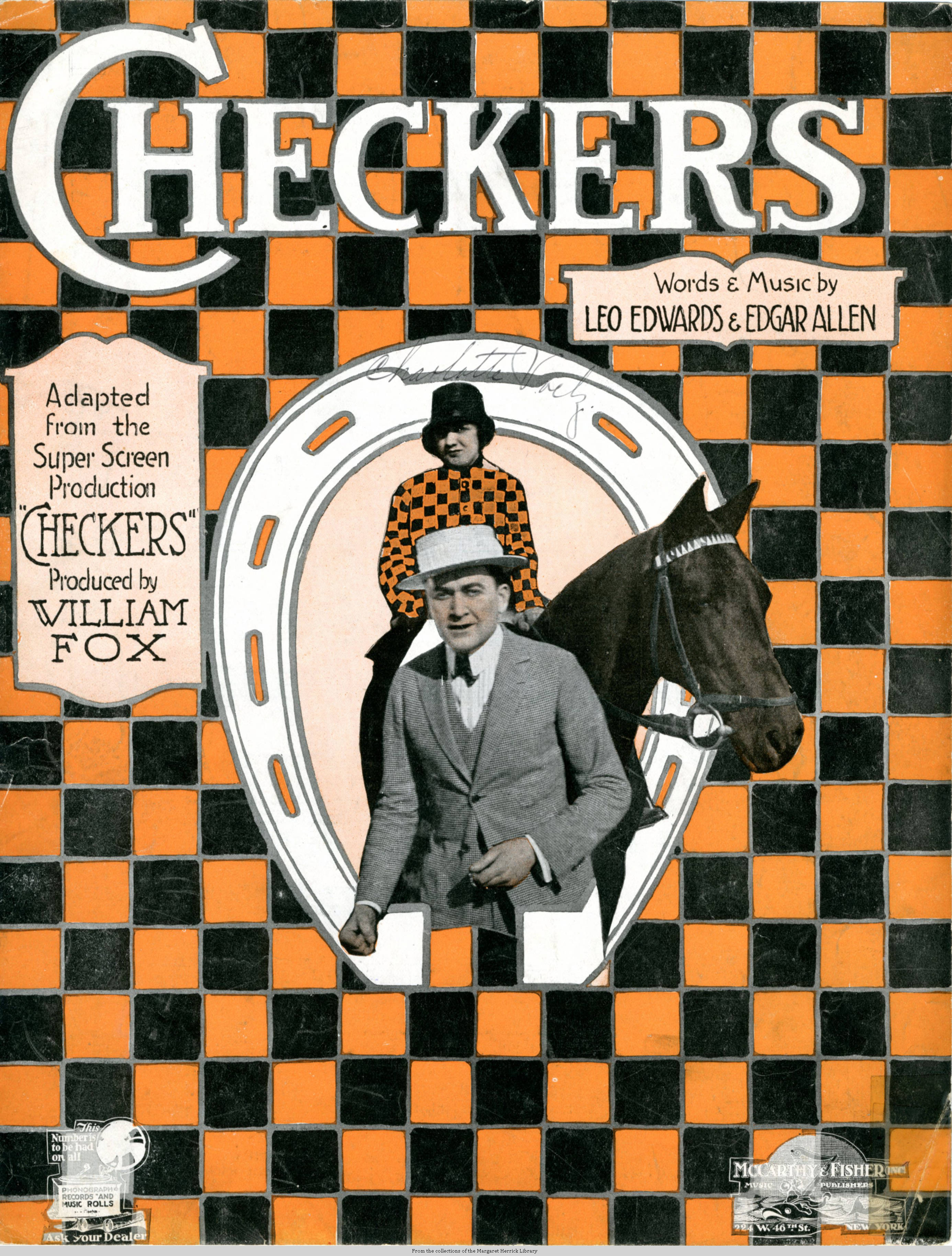
Sheet music cover for Checkers

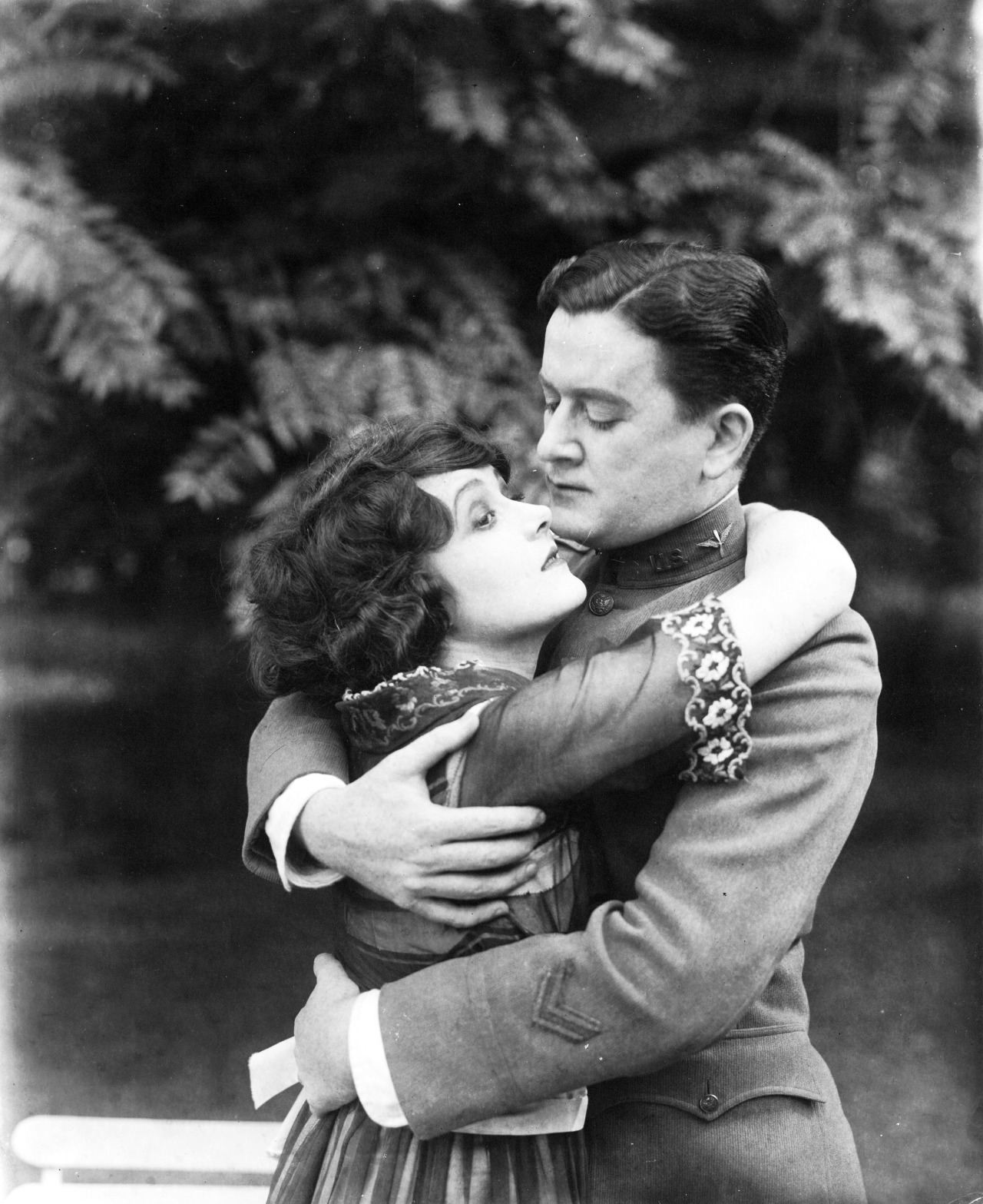
Still from Love's Flame with Vivienne Osborne

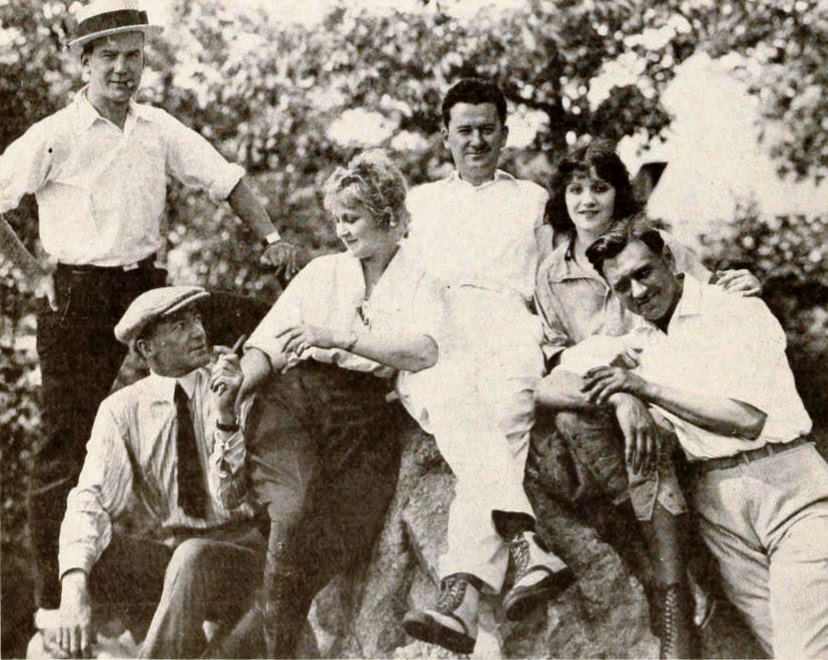
With cast members, director, and production company president for A Cry at Midnight

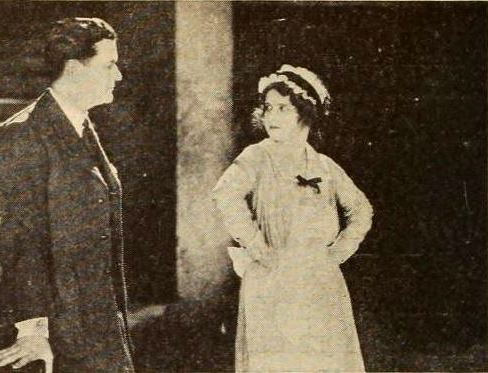
In Room and Board (1921 film) with Constance Binney

Thomas Carrigan (April 13, 1886 in Lapeer - October 2, 1941) was an actor who starred in silent films in the U.S. He appeared in early Selig films and played dime store novel detective character Nick Carter in a series of short films.

== Filmography ==
- Told in Colorado (1911)
- Western Hearts (1911)
- Why the Sheriff is a Bachelor (1911)
- Saved by the Pony Express (1911)
- Arabia The Equine Detective (1913)
- A Cry at Midnight (1916)
- Dimples (1916)
- Rose of the Alley (1916)
- Lovely Mary (1916)
- Peggy, the Will O' the Wisp (1917)
- Somewhere in America (film) (1917)
- Checkers (1919)
- The Truth (1920)
- The Tiger's Cub (1920)
- In Walked Mary (1920)
- Room and Board (1921)
- Salomy Jane (1923)
- You Can't Fool Your Wife (1923)
- Boston Blackie
- Crooked Alley (1923)
- The Making of O'Malley (1925)
- The Big Broadcast(1932)
- Air Mail (1932)
