= 39 East =

Play by Rachel Crothers

39 East is a play in three acts by dramatist Rachel Crothers. The work set in New York City at a boarding house and in Central Park, and is based on Crothers own life experience moving to New York and living in a boarding house while pursuing a career as an actress.

== Plot ==
The plot centers on the character of Penelope Penn, the daughter of a minister in rural America, who has come to New York City to pursue a career as a singer. Initially intent in performing in the more socially respectable profession of a classical choir, she ends up being engaged as a chorus girl in a Broadway revue; a decision that shocks the moral sensibilities of the older women running the boarding house she lives in. A romance occurs between Penelope Penn and Napoleon Gibbs, a man with a troublesome past, who woos her in Central Park. After several complications, all ends happily with the marriage of the couple and Penelope's career as a singer on the rise.

== History ==
Produced by the Shubert family, 39 East premiered on Broadway at the Broadhurst Theatre on March 31, 1919. The original cast included Constance Binney as Penelope Penn, Henry Hull as Napoleon Gibbs, Alison Skipworth as Madam de Mailly, Blanche Friderici as Miss MacMasters, Louis Alberni as Count Gionelli, Victor Sutherland as Timothy O'Brien, John Kirkpatrick as Washington, Lucia Moore as Mrs. Smith, Edith Gresham as Miss Sadie Clarence, Mildred Arden as Miss Myrtle Clarence, Jessie Graham as Evalina, Albert Carroll as Dr. Hubbard, Gertrude Clemens as Rosa, and John Morris as the Policeman. The actress Tallulah Bankhead took over the role of Penelope Penn for part of the show's run.

39 East was published by Walter Baker & Company in 1919, with republications in 1924 and 1925. The play was adapted into a 1920 silent film directed by John S. Robertson with many of the actors from the stage version reprising their roles for the film.
