= Vincent Coleman =

American actor

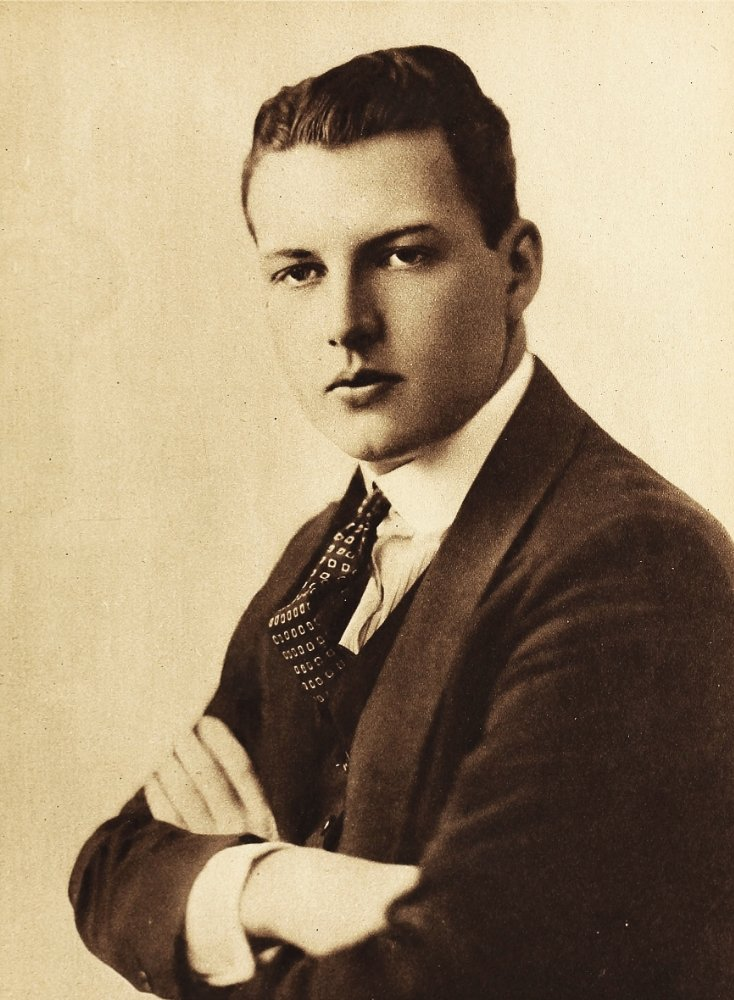
- Motion Picture Magazine, 1920
- Born: February 16, 1900; Louisiana, U.S.
- Died: October 26, 1971 (aged 71); Los Angeles U.S.
- Other name: Willie B. Coleman
- Years active: 1912–1923

Vincent Coleman (February 16, 1900 – October 26, 1971) was an American stage and film actor of the silent film era of the late 1910s and early 1920s.

== Biography ==
Born in Louisiana, Coleman began his acting career while still a young boy; touring the United States with the Cecil Spooner stock theater company. Occasionally credited in the early years of his career as Willie B. Coleman, he made the transition to film in the 1912 Frank Montgomery drama short The Junior Officer at age twelve opposite film actors Hobart Bosworth and Camille Astor before returning to Broadway at the age of sixteen to appear in the 1917 play Difference in Gods. Coleman then returned to filmmaking to play a variety of juvenile roles for such film studios as Fox, Goldwyn Pictures Corporation, First National and Paramount opposite such actors as Corinne Griffith, Mae Murray, Constance Talmadge and Constance Binney.

At the beginning of the 1920s, Hollywood film producers took notice of the handsome, fair, young actor and saw in Coleman a possible "All American" matinee idol to counter the "Latin lover" types such as Ramón Novarro, Antonio Moreno and Rudolf Valentino that were becoming increasingly popular among the nation's theater-goers. In 1919 however, Coleman's further foray into moving pictures was a less than glamorous role in the anti-syphilis propaganda film Scarlet Trail, which was inspired by the World War I era for-men-only medical pamphlet Don't Take a Chance. Coleman was eventually groomed by the studios to become a leading man and had starring roles in the 1921 George Fawcett directed remake of the 1914 Mary Pickford comedy film Such A Little Queen and The Magic Cup, released the same year before returning to Broadway in July 1921 to star in the Sam H. Harris produced play Nice People opposite renowned stage actress Tallulah Bankhead.

In 1923 Coleman appeared in the independently produced "epic" film Salome as Herod, opposite actress Diana Allen. The film proved to be a colossal financial disappointment however and Coleman's film career never recovered and the young actor became disillusioned with film. Coleman made only two more motion pictures (both released in 1923); Has The World Gone Mad! with Hedda Hopper and Elinor Fair and the comedy The Purple Highway starring Monte Blue, Madge Kennedy and Pedro de Cordoba.

After retiring from films at the age of twenty-two, Coleman concentrated further on his stage career.

Coleman died in Los Angeles, California in 1971 at the age of seventy-one.

== Complete filmography ==
Year	Title	Role	Notes
1912	The Junior Officer		Short
1918	The Scarlet Trail	Bob Grafton	
1918	The Prodigal Wife	Victor Middleton	
1919	The Law of Nature	Guy Bolton	
1919	Should a Husband Forgive?	Joh Carroll Jr.	
1920	Partners of the Night	Gerald	
1920	Good References	William Marshall	
1920	For the Freedom of Ireland	Robert Emmett Corrigan	
1921	Princess Jones	Arthur Forbes	
1921	The Magic Cup	Bob Norton	
1921	Such a Little Queen	Stephen of Hetland	
1922	Fascination	Ralph Kellogg (an American)	
1922	Divorce Coupons	Buddy	
1922	A Game of Graft		short film
1923	Salomé	Herod	
1923	Has the World Gone Mad?	The Adams Son	
1923	The Purple Highway	Dudley Quail	(final film role)
