= Love, Honor and Obey =

1920 silent film directed by Leander de Cordova

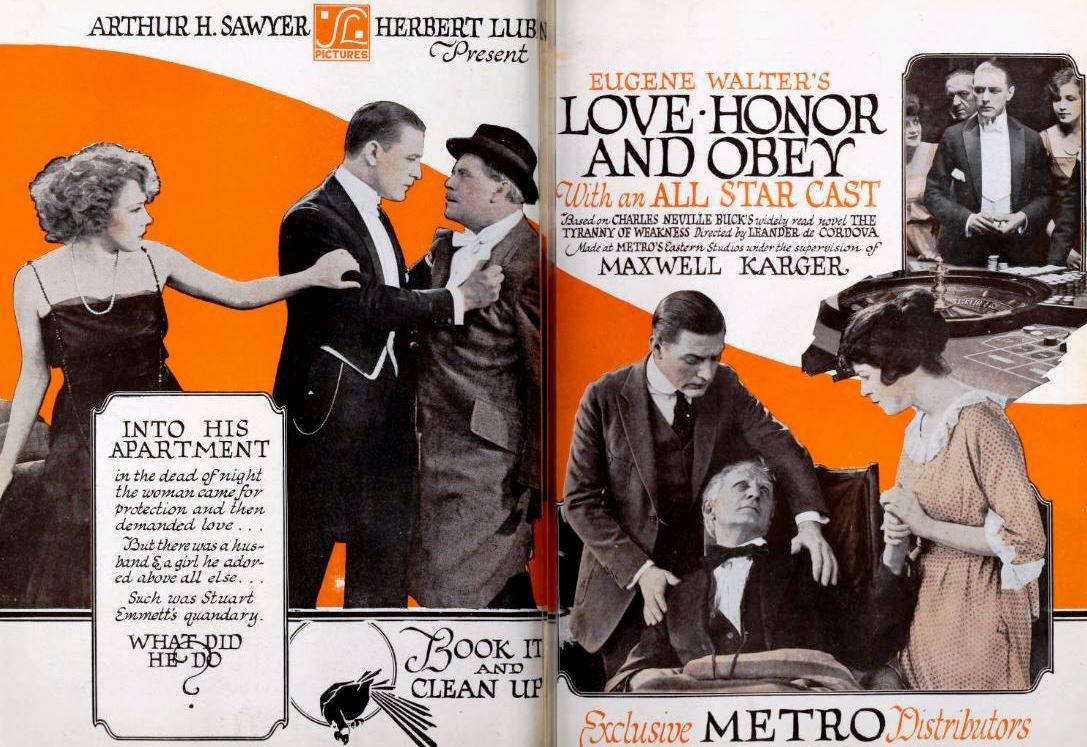
- Advertisement
- Directed by: Leander de Cordova
- Written by: Eugene Walter
- Based on: The Tyranny of Weakness by Charles Neville Buck
- Produced by: Maxwell Karger
- Starring: Wilda Bennett; Claire Whitney; Henry Harmon
- Cinematography: Arthur Martinelli
- Production company: S-L Pictures
- Distributed by: Metro Pictures
- Release date: September 6, 1920 (US)
- Running time: 6 reels
- Country: United States
- Language: Silent (English intertitles)

Love, Honor and Obey is a 1920 American silent drama film. Directed by Leander de Cordova, the film stars Wilda Bennett, Claire Whitney, and Henry Harmon. It was released on September 6, 1920. It is a screen adaptation by Eugene Walter of C.N. Buck's novel The Tyranny of Weakness.

== Plot ==
The film tells the story of Conscience Williams, a young New England woman who, at her father's urging, agrees to marry a wealthy local church deacon despite being in love with a New York novelist. The novelist's liberal views have already drawn scandal in their Puritanical community, and when he is named as co-respondent in a high-profile divorce case, Conscience severs ties with him entirely. His involvement, however, is in name only. Upon discovering she has been deceived and that the man she loves is innocent, she bolts the door of her bridal chamber against her new husband, setting in motion a dramatic conflict centered on the obligations of marriage vows made under false pretenses.

== Cast ==
- Wilda Bennett as Conscience Williams
- Claire Whitney as Marion Holbury
- Henry Harmon as William Williams
- Kenneth Harlan as Stuart Emmett
- George Cowl as Eben Tollman
- E. J. Radcliffe as Jack Holbury (credited as E. J. Ratcliffe)
