= Blanche Friderici =

American actress (1878–1933)

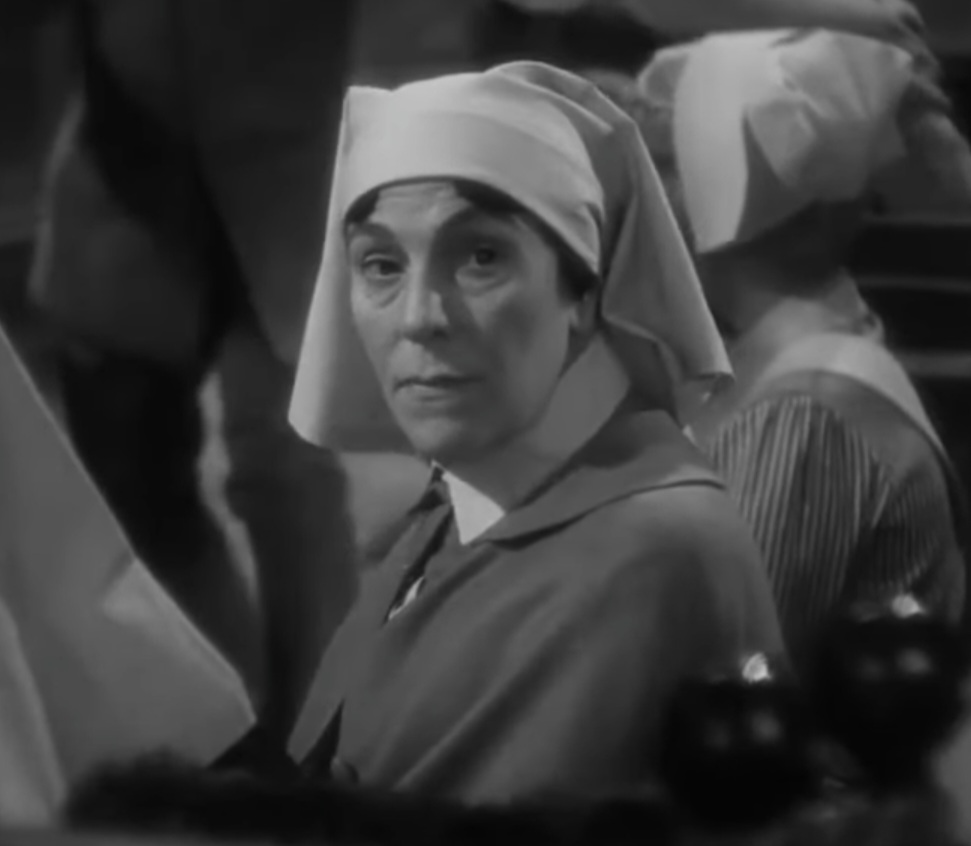
- Friderici in A Farewell to Arms (1932)
- Born: January 21, 1878; Brooklyn, New York, U.S.
- Died: December 23, 1933 (aged 55); Visalia, California, U.S.
- Other name: Blanche Frederici
- Occupation: Actress
- Years active: 1914–1933
- Spouse: Donald Campbell (m. 1925)

Blanche L. Friderici (January 21, 1878 – December 23, 1933) was an American film and stage actress, sometimes credited as Blanche Frederici.

== Early years ==
Friderici was a native of Brooklyn, New York. Her parents were William E. Friderici and Rosetta Elizabeth Freeman Friderici.

== Career ==
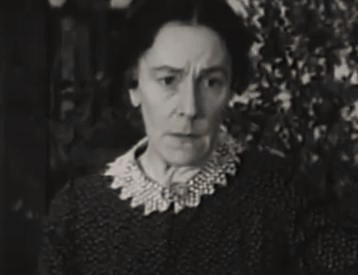
Friderici in Man of the Forest (1933)

Friderici did not aspire to be an actress, but rather an acting and elocution teacher. However, her eyesight began to fail, deteriorating to the point she could no longer read, so she turned from teaching acting to actually acting. An admirer of her recitals introduced her to impresario David Belasco, who cast her in The Darling of the Gods.

Between 1914 and 1927, Friderici appeared in nine Broadway theatre productions in New York City, including a production of 39 East (1919) and as Mrs. Davidson in the play Rain.

Friderici appeared in sixty films from 1920 to 1934. Her début was as Miss McMasters in the film adaptation of 39 East (1920). In Night Nurse (1931), which starred Barbara Stanwyck and Clark Gable, she played a housekeeper too frightened to protect two children from a murder attempt. She portrayed a chaperone in Flying Down to Rio (1933). Her last film role was as a motel owner's wife in It Happened One Night (1934).

== Personal life ==
Friderici married Donald Campbell, a stage manager, in 1925.

== Death ==
On December 23, 1933, Friderici died in Visalia, California from a heart attack she suffered on her way to a Christmas service at General Grant National Park. She was 55.

== Complete filmography ==
- 39 East (1920) as Miss McMasters
- No Trespassing (1922) as Dorinda
- Sadie Thompson (1928) as Mrs. Alfred Davidson
- Gentlemen Prefer Blondes (1928) as Miss Chapman
- Fleetwing (1928) as Furja
- Stolen Love (1928) as Aunt Evvie
- Wonder of Women (1929) as Stephen Trombolt's Housekeeper
- The Awful Truth (1929) as Mrs. Leeson
- Jazz Heaven (1929) as Mrs. Langley
- The Trespasser (1929) as Miss Potter, Nurse
- The Flattering Word (1929 short) as Mrs. Zukor
- The Dead Line (1929 short)
- Marching On (1929 short)
- Trifles (1929 short) as Mrs. Peters
- Personality (1930) as Ma
- The Girl Said No (1930) as Mrs. McAndrews (uncredited)
- A Notorious Affair (1930) as Lady Teel (uncredited)
- Soldiers and Women (1930) as Martha
- The Bad One (1930) as Madame Durand
- Courage (1930) as Aunt Caroline
- Numbered Men (1930) as Mrs. Miller
- The Office Wife (1930) as Kate Halsey
- Billy the Kid (1930) as Mrs. McSween
- Kismet (1930) as Narjis
- The Cat Creeps (1930) as Mam' Pleasant
- Ten Cents a Dance (1931) as Mrs. Blanchard
- Woman Hungry (1931) as Mrs. Temple
- Night Nurse (1931) as Mrs. Maxwell
- Murder by the Clock (1931) as Julia Endicott
- The Woman Between (1931) as Mrs. Weston
- A Dangerous Affair (1931) as Letty Randolph
- Friends and Lovers (1931) as Lady Allice
- Wicked (1931) as Mrs. Johnson
- Honor of the Family (1931) as Mme. Boris
- Mata Hari (1931) as Sister Angelica
- The Hatchet Man (1932) as Madame Si-Si (uncredited)
- Lady with a Past (1932) as Nora
- Young Bride (1932) as Miss Margaret Gordon, the Librarian
- So Big (1932) as Widow Paarlenburg (uncredited)
- State's Attorney (1932) as Night Court Judge (uncredited)
- Miss Pinkerton (1932) as Mary
- Love Me Tonight (1932) as Third Aunt
- The Night Club Lady (1932) as Mrs. Carewe
- Thirteen Women (1932) as Miss Kirsten
- Three on a Match (1932) as Miss Blazer (uncredited)
- If I Had a Million (1932) as Mrs. Garvey (uncredited)
- Behind Jury Doors (1932) as Mrs. Lanfield
- A Farewell to Arms (1932) as Head Nurse
- Cynara (1932) as Concerned Mother in Courtroom (uncredited)
- The Thundering Herd (1933) as Mrs. Jane Jett
- Secrets (1933) as Mrs. Martha Marlowe
- Alimony Madness (1933) as Mrs. Van
- The Barbarian (1933) as Mrs. Hume
- Adorable (1933) as The Countess
- Hold Your Man (1933) as Mrs. Wagner
- Man of the Forest (1933) as Mrs. Peg Forney
- Aggie Appleby, Maker of Men (1933) as Aunt Katherine
- The Way to Love (1933) as Rosalie
- Flying Down to Rio (1933) as Dona Elena De Rezende
- All of Me (1934) as Miss Haskell
- It Happened One Night (1934) as Zeke's wife
