= Wilda Bennett =

American actress (1894–1967)

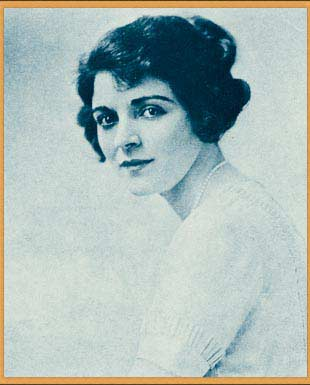
- Portrait of Bennett in Who's Who on the Screen, 1920
- Born: December 19, 1894; Asbury Park, New Jersey
- Died: December 20, 1967 (aged 73); Winnemucca, Nevada
- Occupation: Actress
- Spouses: Robert Schable Abraham de Albrew Anthony J. Wettach; Munro Whitmore

Wilda Bennett (December 19, 1894 – December 20, 1967) was an American actress in musical comedies and in film. Her tumultuous personal life also kept her in the headlines.

== Early life ==
Bennett was born in Asbury Park, New Jersey. Bennett's father was John H. Bennett, a city building inspector.

== Career ==
Bennett's Broadway credits included Everywoman (1911–1912), A Good Little Devil (1913), The Only Girl (1914–1915), The Riviera Girl (1917), The Girl Behind the Gun (1918–1919), Apple Blossoms (1919–1920), Music Box Revue (1921–1922), The Lady in Ermine (1922–1923), and the title role in Madame Pompadour (1924–1925). She had a "sweet" soprano voice. Bennett's later stage appearances were in Lovely Lady (1928), and Merrily We Roll Along (1934). She reprised her title role in The Only Girl for a radio production in 1927.

Films featuring Wilda Bennett included A Good Little Devil (1914, lost), Love, Honor and Obey (1920), Bullets or Ballots (1936), Dark Victory (1939), The Women (1939), What a Life (1939), Ninotchka (1939), Those Were the Days! (1940), and The Lady Eve (1941).

== Personal life ==
Bennett's personal life involved multiple legal troubles that brought additional, ongoing, national press attention. In 1925, she was sued for $100,000 by a woman named Katherine Frey, who believed that Bennett had been her husband Charles Frey's lover. Katherine Frey won a judgment of $25,000 in the case. While the lawsuit was still pending, Charles Frey was driving Bennett's car when it struck a young woman, who was killed. Bennett was a passenger in the car. In 1927, she was sued for the care expenses of a horse she once owned. In 1928, she was sued for damages by a landlord who said Bennett destroyed furniture and removed other items from a rented apartment. Bennett lost that case, too, and had to pay $400 to the landlord. In 1930, Bennett sued Anthony J. Wettach after another car accident; she ended up marrying him instead. In 1932, she was arrested on charges of being drunk and disorderly.

Bennett was married four times. Her husbands were, in order, actor-producer Robert Schable (divorced in 1920), Argentine dancer Abraham "Peppy" de Albrew (married 1926, separated in 1927), Anthony J. Wettach (married 1930, divorced 1933), and mining engineer Munro Whitmore (died 1960).

Bennett died on December 20, 1967, in Winnemucca, Nevada.
