= Something Different (1920 film) =

1920 film by Roy William Neill

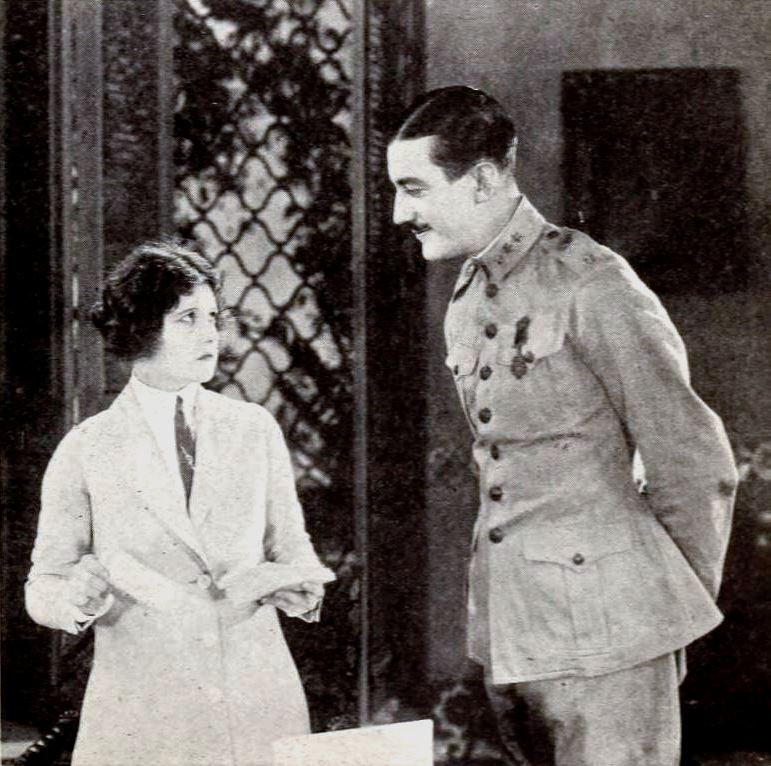
- Still with Constance Binney and Ward Crane
- Directed by: Roy William Neill; Edward Brophy (ass't director)
- Written by: Kathryn Stuart (scenario)
- Based on: Calderon's Prisoner; 1903 novel by Alice Duer Miller
- Produced by: Realart Pictures
- Starring: Constance Binney
- Cinematography: Harry Leslie Keepers; Oliver T. Marsh; Leo Tover(?assistant)
- Distributed by: Realart Pictures
- Release date: December 1920
- Running time: 5 or 6 reels
- Country: United States
- Language: Silent (English intertitles)

Something Different is a lost 1920 American silent drama film produced and distributed by Realart Pictures, an affiliate of Famous Players–Lasky and Paramount Pictures. It is based on a novel, Calderon's Prisoner, by Alice Duer Miller. The picture was directed by Roy William Neill with some filming being done in Cuba. Some of the cast's passport photos to enter Cuba for this production are found at Flickr.

Leo Tover, then 19 years old, later became a well known cinematographer. He took a passport photo to go to Cuba with other members of the film's company. It is unclear what Tover's role in the production was.

== Plot ==
As summarized in a film publication, Alice Lea, an heiress reaching the end of her funds, was being forced into a marriage for money, so she decided to seek adventure in Central American and visit a friend. She learned that Don Luis, husband of her friend, was hostile to the government and secretly planning to overthrow it. At the government ball Alice met Don Mariano, head of the army. During the ball she witnessed Mariano kill a spy and hated him for his cruelty. Later Alice is taken prisoner by Mariano on suspicion that she is aiding Don Luis in his revolt. Alice was made very comfortable in Don Mariano's home and, while she would not admit it, she was falling in love with her captor. Mariano was also falling in love with his captive, so much so that managed her release and also promised that of her friend's husband Don Luis, who had been captured and likely faced death. Alice returned to her home, and was soon followed by Mariano, who had been exiled for allowing the prisoners to escape. He told Alice of his love, and of course they lived happily thereafter.

== Cast ==
- Constance Binney as Alice Lea
- Lucy Fox as Rosa Vargas
- Ward Crane as Don Mariano Calderon
- Crane Wilbur as Don Luis Vargas
- Gertrude Hillman as Calderon's Housekeeper
- Mark Smith as Richard Bidgley
- Grace Studdiford as Mrs. Evans (credited as Grace Studiford)
- Riley Hatch as Mr. Stimson (credited as William Riley Hatch)
- Adolph Milar as Spy (credited as Adolph Millar)

== Reviews and public opinion ==
Something Different received a multitude of mixed opinions during its time in theaters, and despite Realart Pictures’ aggressive advertising near the start of its lifetime, viewers’ reviews gradually grew more critical as they moved on to delve into other, more entertaining films. As such, Something Different eventually faded from public memory, and soon it disappeared from physical records altogether, becoming one of the countless lost films of the silent era.

Upon the film’s release in December 1920, positive commentary mostly came from articles written by Realart, who claimed that the film would be a massive success. The 1920 November-December issue of Motion Picture News, published in November of that year, featured an article from Realart praising the work of director Roy William Niell and his “rare technique and imaginative power,” hoping to generate excitement for the “masterpiece” film Something Different before it was released. Shortly after, in January 1921, The Exhibitors Herald praised the film’s breathtaking scenery and youthful energy, and it was projected to find success in the box office. In the following months, theaters across the country continued to show the film and viewers gave it positive reviews, albeit less so in later months. Multiple editions of The Moving Picture World showed that Something Different was still being shown as late as March 1921, and The Exhibitors Herald still listed the film under the “Guide to Current Pictures” in June.

At the same time, however, critical reviews became more negative over time as they commented on what they perceived as a weak plot held up only by impressive imagery and the presence of Constance Binney, a popular actress as the lead role. In The Exhibitors Herald from April 1921, critic J. H. Vaugham wrote “It’s a shame to waste good direction, photography, and cast on such a frail theme. ...Does not give the star a fair chance.” Moreover, in Wid’s Daily from January 1921, an article titled “Pleasing Star But Story Only Mildly Interesting” disdainfully reviewed Something Different, noting that, on top of Binney’s lackluster performance, the plot overall was both confusing and boring. Over time, the combination of negative reviews, the ever-present wave of new films, and the rise of sound films led to the disappearance of Something Different. It lost its initial popularity and its relevance by the start of the sound era, and although there is no record of how the film itself was lost, there is a high probability that it was intentionally destroyed.
