= Crooked Alley =

1923 film

- Directed by: Robert F. Hill
- Screenplay by: Adrian Johnson; Robert F. Hill
- Story by: Jack Boyle
- Starring: Thomas Carrigan; Laura La Plante; Tom Guise; Owen Gorin; Al Hart
- Cinematography: Harry M. Fowler
- Production company: Universal Pictures
- Distributed by: Universal Pictures
- Release date: November 7, 1923
- Running time: 50 minutes
- Country: United States
- Language: Silent (English intertitles)

Crooked Alley is a 1923 American silent crime film directed by Robert F. Hill and written by Adrian Johnson and Robert F. Hill. The film stars Thomas Carrigan, Laura La Plante, Tom Guise, Owen Gorin and Al Hart. The film was released on November 7, 1923, by Universal Pictures. A print of Crooked Alley exists in the UCLA Film & Television Archive.

== Cast ==
- Thomas Carrigan as Boston Blackie
- Laura La Plante as Norine Tyrell/Olive Sloan
- Tom Guise as Judge Milnar
- Owen Gorin as Rudy Milnar
- Al Hart as Kaintuck
