= The Magic Cup =

1921 film by John S. Robertson

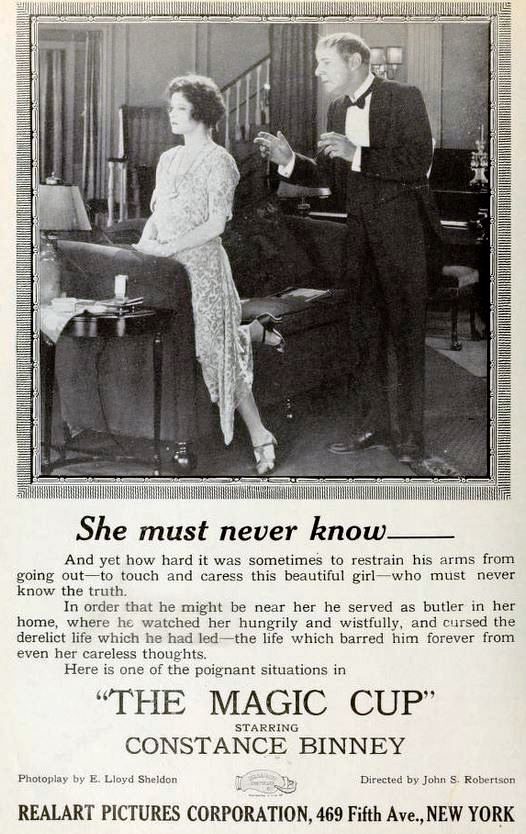
- Advertisement for film
- Directed by: John S. Robertson
- Written by: E. Lloyd Sheldon
- Story by: E. Lloyd Sheldon
- Starring: Constance Binney; Vincent Coleman; Blanche Craig
- Cinematography: Roy Overbaugh
- Production company: Realart Pictures
- Release date: April 1921
- Running time: 5 reels
- Country: United States
- Language: Silent (English intertitles)

The Magic Cup is a lost 1921 American silent adventure film directed by John S. Robertson and written by E. Lloyd Sheldon. It stars Constance Binney, Vincent Coleman, and Blanche Craig.

== Plot ==
Every time Mary Mallory needs money she pawns a silver cup which her mother left to her. The Patrician, a crook, tells Abe the pawn broker, that Mary must be the granddaughter of Lord Fitzroy, an Irish nobleman. One of the crooks impersonates Fitzroy and Mary is established in a beautiful Long Island home as the long lost granddaughter. Bob, a reporter known to Mary in her dishwasher days, falls in love with her but is suspicious of her "relatives". He cables to Ireland and the real Fitzroy arrives. He recognizes the butler as his son, but at his request Mary never knows that he is her father. The man dies, Mary pleads for the freedom of the crooks and then goes back to Ireland with Bob and her real grandfather.

== Cast ==
- Constance Binney as Mary Malloy
- Vincent Coleman as Bob Norton
- Blanche Craig as Mrs. Nolan
- William H. Strauss as Abe Timberg
- Charles Mussett as Peter Venner
- J.H. Gilmour as The Patrician
- Malcolm Bradley as 'Paste' Parsons
- Cecil Owen as The Derelict
