= Van Slyke =

Van Slyke or Van Slycke is a Dutch toponymic surname meaning "of/from Slyke". The Dictionary of American Family Names published by Oxford University Press documents the two most likely meanings of the word "Slyke" here:

1. from Middle Dutch slijcke "mire", "marshy place" (modern Dutch slijk)
2. from a place named after this word, such as Slijkenburg in Friesland, Slijkewijck in Gelderland or possibly Slik in North Holland

== People with the surname Van Slyke ==
- Andy Van Slyke (born 1960), American baseball player
- David Van Slyke (born 1968), American academic
- Donald Van Slyke (1883–1971), Dutch American chemist
- Helen Van Slyke (1919–1979), American writer
- Lucille Baldwin Van Slyke (1879–1966), American writer
- Rik Van Slycke (born 1963), former Belgian cyclist
- Scott Van Slyke (born 1986), American baseball player, son of Andy Van Slyke
- Steven Van Slyke (born 1956), American chemist

== See also ==
- Van Slyke determination, chemical test
