= Robert Schable =

American actor

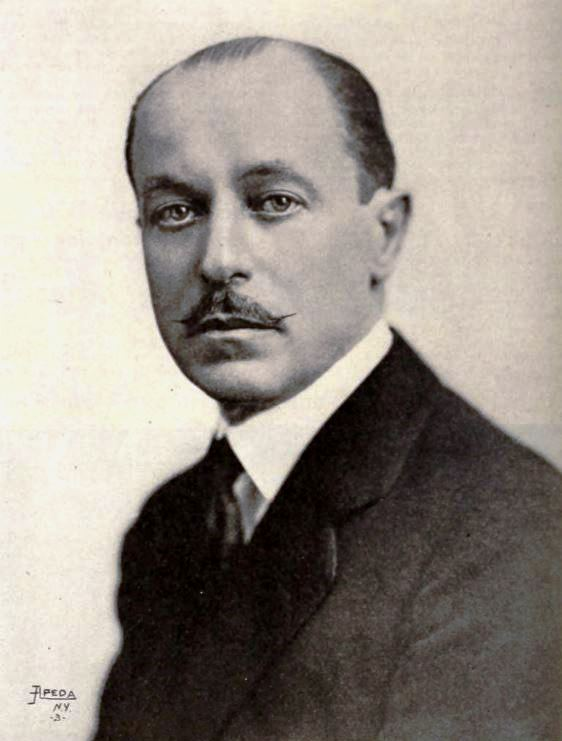
- Robert Schable, 1920
- Born: August 31, 1873; Hamilton, Ohio
- Died: July 3, 1947 (aged 73); Hollywood, California
- Occupation: Actor
- Years active: 1890s-1929
- Spouse: Wilda Bennett (1912-20 divorced)

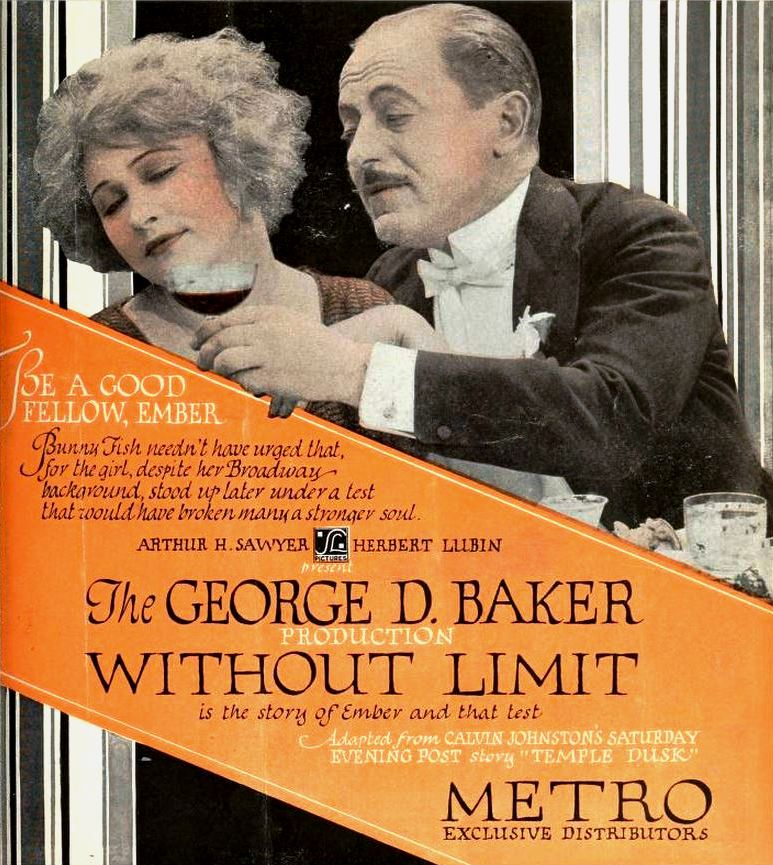
Anna Q. Nilsson and Robert Schable in Without Limit 1921

Robert Schable (August 31, 1873 – July 3, 1947) was an American stage and screen actor as well as a stage manager, known for his screen portrayals of upper-class villains.

== Career ==
Born in Hamilton, Ohio to German immigrants Charles Schable and Mary Hesterberg, Schable was a stage performer with the Charles Frohman company in the 1890s, and a stage manager with John Drew Jr. in the decade following that. He began in silent films in 1919, often playing comedic, character parts or men with a European flair.

Broadway shows in which Schable appeared included On With the Dance (1917), The Fallen Idol (1915), Inconstant George (1909), Jack Straw (1908), De Lancey (1905), The Duke of Killicrankie (1904), Captain Dieppe (1903), The Mummy and the Humming Bird (1903), The Mummy and the Humming Bird (1902), The Second in Command (1901), Richard Carvel (1900), Beau Brummell (1899), Cyrano de Bergerac (1899), and The Man of Destiny (1899).

Following his retirement from acting in 1929, Schable was director George Fitzmaurice's business manager.

== Personal life and death ==
Schable was married to Wilda Bennett from March 20, 1912 until their divorce on August 12, 1920.

On July 3, 1947, Schable, despondent over his worsening health and residing at the Virginia Rest Home at 2120 North Vermont Avenue in Hollywood, was found by a nurse in the bathroom of his apartment, dead, having slashed his throat with a razor. He had left a note requesting that his attorney be contacted and giving instructions regarding the funeral. His estate, valued at $5,000, was divided between personal friends and an assortment of theatrical benefit organizations. Schable had no immediate relatives. Following the funeral on July 7, his remains were cremated.

== Selected filmography ==
- The World to Live In (1919)
- The Marriage Price (1919)
- Redhead (1919)
- The Test of Honor (1919)
- The Firing Line (1919)
- On with the Dance (1920)
- Sinners (1920)
- The Stolen Kiss (1920)
- A Romantic Adventuress (1920)
- Blind Wives (1920)
- Paying the Piper (1921)
- Without Limit (1921)
- Experience (1921)
- Sisters (1922)
- Sherlock Holmes (1922)
- The Woman Who Fooled Herself (1922)
- Love's Masquerade (1922)
- Bella Donna (1923)
- Slander the Woman (1923)
- In Search of a Thrill (1923)
- The Silent Partner (1923)
- The Cheat (1923)
- The Stranger (1924)
- Partners Again (1926)
- Silken Shackles (1926)
- The Love of Sunya (1927)
- Sailors' Wives (1928)
- Careers (1929)
- The Man and the Moment (1929)
- The Locked Door (1929) (uncredited)
