= Arabia The Equine Detective =

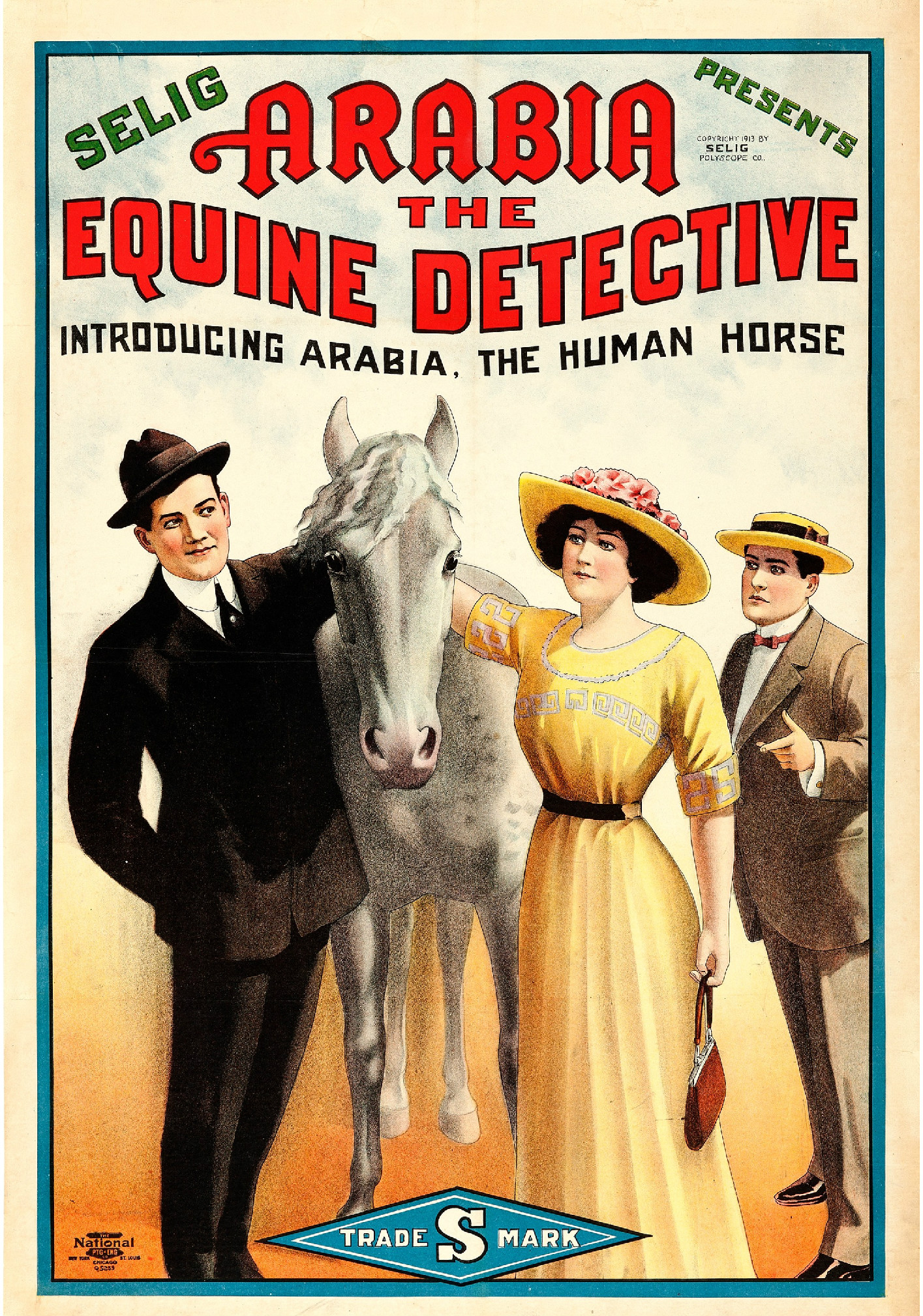
- Theatrical release poster
- Directed by: Oscar Eagle
- Produced by: Selig Polyscope Company
- Starring: Arabia
- Distributed by: General Film Company; Selig Polyscope Company
- Release date: April 3, 1913
- Running time: 1 reel (11 minutes)
- Country: United States
- Languages: Silent film (English intertitles)

Arabia The Equine Detective is a 1913 American silent short film directed by Oscar Eagle. It starred a horse called Arabia, Thomas Carrigan and Lillian Logan. It was produced by the Selig Polyscope Company and released on April 3, 1913.

== Cast ==
- Arabia, The Human Horse as a horse
- Thomas Carrigan as Bob Collins
- Lillian Logan as Violet Ford
