= Redhead (1919 film) =

1919 film by Charles Maigne

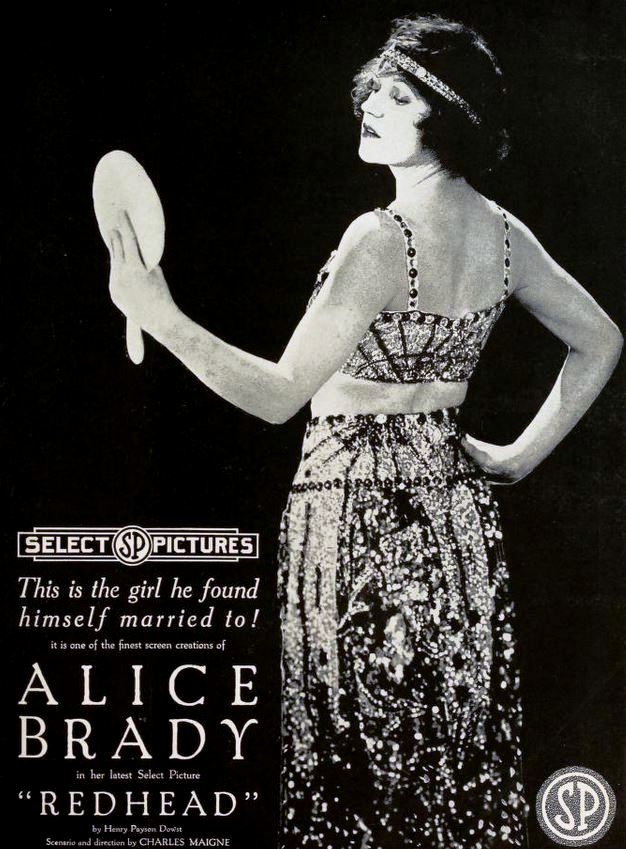
- Directed by: Charles Maigne
- Written by: Henry Payson Dowst; Charles Maigne
- Starring: Alice Brady; Conrad Nagel; Robert Schable
- Cinematography: Al Liguori
- Production company: Select Pictures
- Distributed by: Select Pictures
- Release date: April 27, 1919
- Running time: 50 minutes
- Country: United States
- Languages: Silent; English intertitles

Redhead is a lost 1919 American silent drama film directed by Charles Maigne and starring Alice Brady, Conrad Nagel and Robert Schable.

The film's sets were designed by the art director William Cameron Menzies.

== Cast ==
- Alice Brady as Dazil Mellows
- Conrad Nagel as Matthew Thurlow
- Robert Schable as Roland Gard
- Charles A. Stevenson as Parker Thurlow
- Charles Eldridge as Mr. Mellows
- May Brettone as Mrs. Mellow

== Bibliography ==
- Darby, William. Masters of Lens and Light: A Checklist of Major Cinematographers and Their Feature Films. Scarecrow Press, 1991.
