= Darkened Rooms =

1929 film

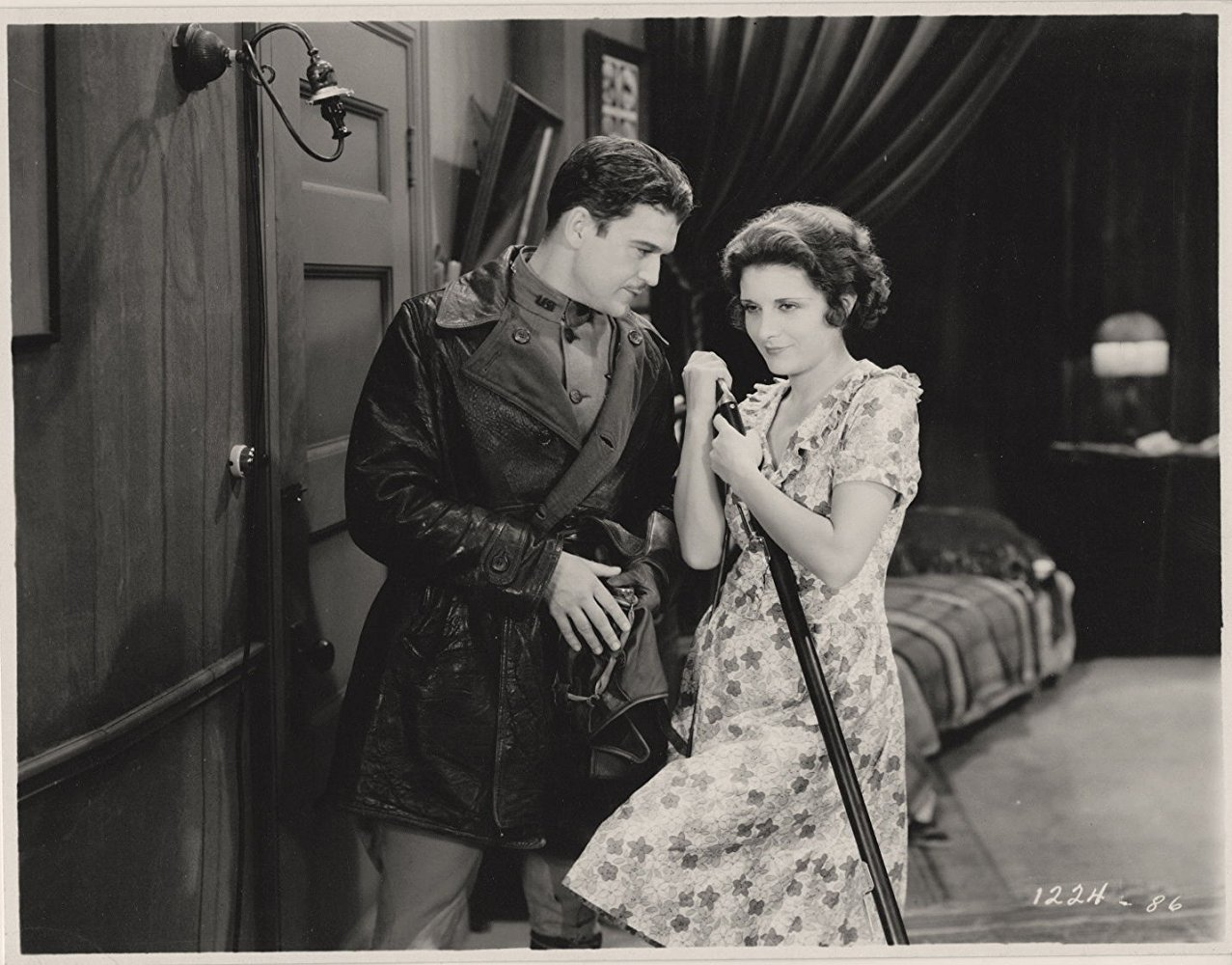
- Neil Hamilton and Evelyn Brent
- Directed by: Louis J. Gasnier
- Written by: Melville Baker; Patrick Kearney; Patrick Konesky; Richard H. Digges Jr.
- Starring: Evelyn Brent; Neil Hamilton; Doris Hill
- Cinematography: Archie Stout
- Edited by: Frances Marsh
- Music by: Karl Hajos
- Distributed by: Paramount Pictures
- Release date: November 23, 1929
- Running time: 66 minutes
- Country: United States
- Language: English

Darkened Rooms is a 1929 American pre-Code mystery film directed by Louis J. Gasnier and starring Evelyn Brent. It was an early talking picture. This film is preserved at the Library of Congress. The film tried to cash in on the interest in spiritualism caused by the then-popular Harry Houdini, but critics felt the film couldn't quite decide whether it was debunking the supernatural, or embracing it.

== Plot ==
The film

A down-on-his-luck photographer named Emory Jago teams up with an out of work dancer named Ellen in a scheme to cheat naive people out of their cash with phony fortunes and psychic readings.

== Cast ==
- Evelyn Brent as Ellen, the fortune teller
- Neil Hamilton as Emory Jago
- Doris Hill as Joyce Clayton
- David Newell as Billy
- Gale Henry as Madame Silvara
- Wallace MacDonald as Bert Nelson
- Blanche Craig as Mrs. Fogarty
- E. H. Calvert as Mr. Clayton

== Criticism ==
Critic Troy Howarth writes: "Like many early talkies, Darkened Rooms suffers from primitive staging and technique, though studio technicians managed some spooky sound effects for the seance sequences....Reviews of the day praised leading lady Evelyn Brent."

== See also ==
- List of early sound feature films (1926–1929)
