= The Test of Honor =

1919 film by John S. Robertson

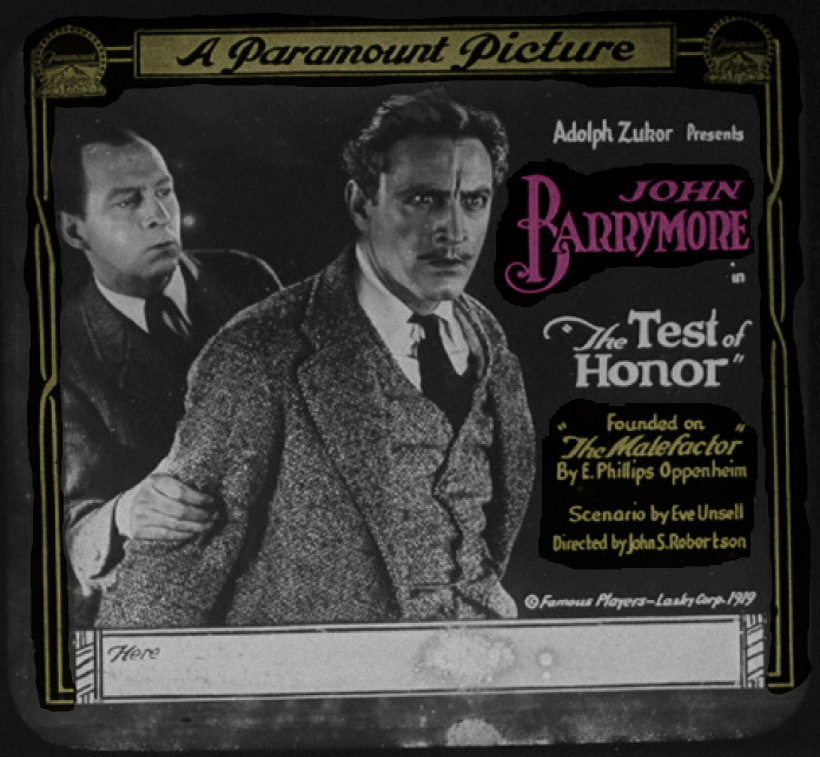
- Lantern slide for The Test of Honor
- Directed by: John S. Robertson
- Written by: Eve Unsell (scenario)
- Based on: E. Phillips Oppenheim (novel The Malefactor, c.1906)
- Produced by: Adolph Zukor; Jesse L. Lasky
- Starring: John Barrymore; Constance Binney
- Cinematography: Jacques Montéran - (French Wikipedia)
- Production company: Famous Players–Lasky
- Distributed by: Paramount Pictures
- Release date: April 6, 1919
- Running time: Five reels at 4,684 feet (50+ minutes)
- Country: United States
- Language: Silent (English intertitles)

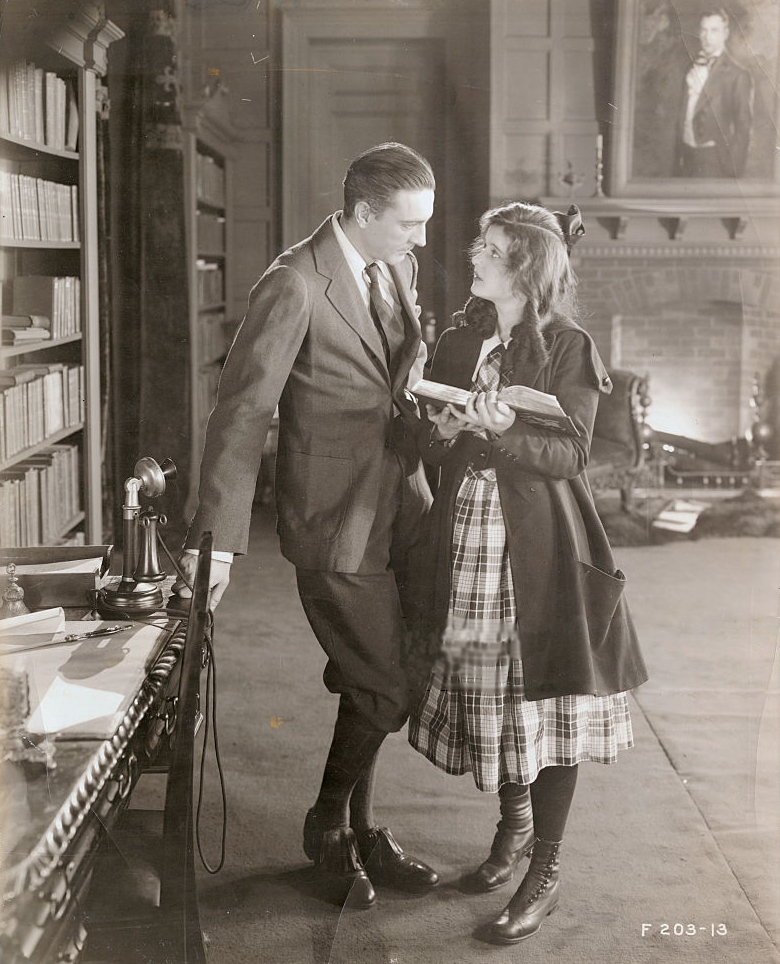
Scene from the film.

The Test of Honor is a 1919 American silent drama film produced by Famous Players–Lasky, released by Paramount, directed by John S. Robertson, and starring John Barrymore. Considered the actor's first drama movie role after years of doing film comedies and farces. It is based on author E. Phillips Oppenheim 1906 novel The Malefactor.

The film was made at Famous Players' East Coast facility and released prior to Robertson and Barrymore's famous Dr. Jekyll and Mr. Hyde (1920).

== Plot ==
Martin Wingrave is arrested and sent to prison for seven years for a crime he didn't commit. While incarcerated he learns that his girlfriend and her male accomplice framed him for the crime. When Wingrave is released he plots revenge against his former girl and her man. However he begins a romance with his neighbor, a young woman who truly loves him and warms his heart.

== Cast ==
- John Barrymore as Martin Wingrave
- Constance Binney as Juliet Hollis
- Marcia Manon as Ruth Curtis
- Robert Schable as Dr. George Lumley
- J. W. Johnston as Mr. Curtis
- Bigelow Cooper as Judge Ferris
- Ned Hay as Lovell
- Alma Aiken as Mrs. Farrell
- Fred Miller as Zeke

uncredited

- Louis Wolheim as Man / Devil In Dream

== Preservation status ==
The Test of Honor is now considered a lost film.

== See also ==
- List of lost films
- John Barrymore filmography
