= Somewhere in America (film) =

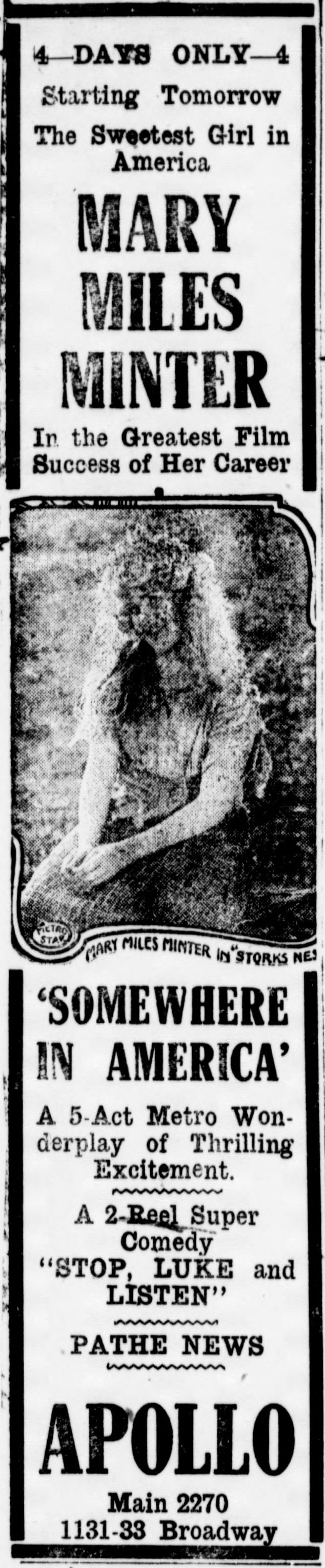
- Contemporary advertisement
- Directed by: William C. Dowlan
- Written by: June Mathis
- Produced by: Louis B. Mayer
- Starring: Thomas J. Carrigan; Francine Larrimore; Herbert Hayes
- Distributed by: Metro Pictures Corporation
- Release date: July 1917
- Running time: 5 reels
- Country: United States
- Languages: Silent; English intertitles

Somewhere in America is a 1917 American silent drama film starring Thomas J. Carrigan and Francine Larrimore. It was written by June Mathis and directed by William C. Dowlan. A copy is known to be held at the George Eastman House in Rochester, New York.

== Plot ==
As described in a film magazine, this film contained some new scenes and a new story line, with old scenes from the 1916 film Rose of the Alley featuring Mary Miles Minter patched into it as an attempt to "cash in" on Minter's fame. In the original film, Minter had played the sister of Thomas J. Carrigan's character, but in this film she was depicted as his wife in the dozen or so old scenes which were recycled.

The plot concerns the attempted theft of plans for new aeroplanes, with a heroine who was at first in love with the villain intending to steal these plans, but who later fell for the hero who thwarted the villain's plans.

== Cast ==
- Thomas J. Carrigan as Thomas Leigh, aka Dorgan
- Francine Larrimore as Dorothy Leigh
- Herbert Hayes as John Gray
- Danny Hogan as Daniel Vereno
- Mary Miles Minter as Rose Dorgan
- Jules Raucourt as Charles Bergere
- Sidney D'Albrook as Shifty
- Harold Hilton as Little Phillip Dubois
