= Such a Little Queen (1914 film) =

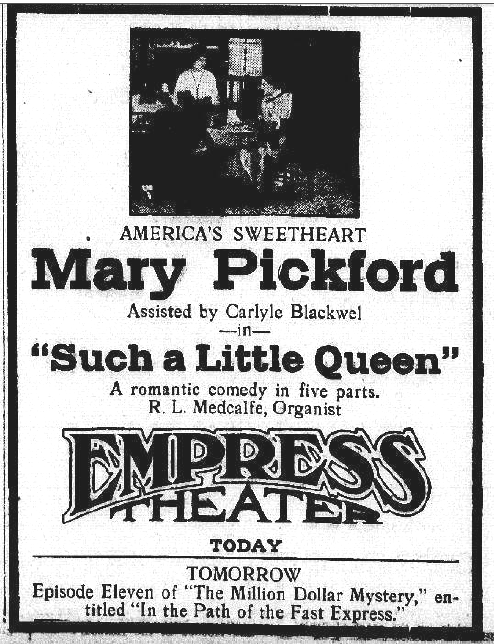
- Ad for the 1914 film
- Directed by: Edwin S. Porter; Hugh Ford
- Written by: Hugh Ford
- Based on: Such a Little Queen by Channing Pollock
- Produced by: Adolph Zukor; Daniel Frohman
- Starring: Mary Pickford
- Cinematography: Ernest Haller
- Distributed by: Paramount Pictures
- Release date: September 21, 1914
- Running time: 5 reels
- Country: United States
- Language: Silent (English intertitles)

Such a Little Queen is a 1914 American silent film starring Mary Pickford. It is based on a 1909 play by Channing Pollock which starred Elsie Ferguson. This film would later be remade in a 1921 version with Constance Binney in the lead. Cinematographer Ernest Haller was in charge of photography on both films.

The 1914 film is now considered a lost film. It is described as being a romantic comedy in five parts.

== Cast ==
- Mary Pickford as Queen Anna Victoria
- Carlyle Blackwell as King Stephen
- Harold Lockwood as Robert Trainor
- Russell Bassett as The Prime Minister
- Arthur Hoops as Prince Eugene

== See also ==
- List of lost films
