= Erstwhile Susan =

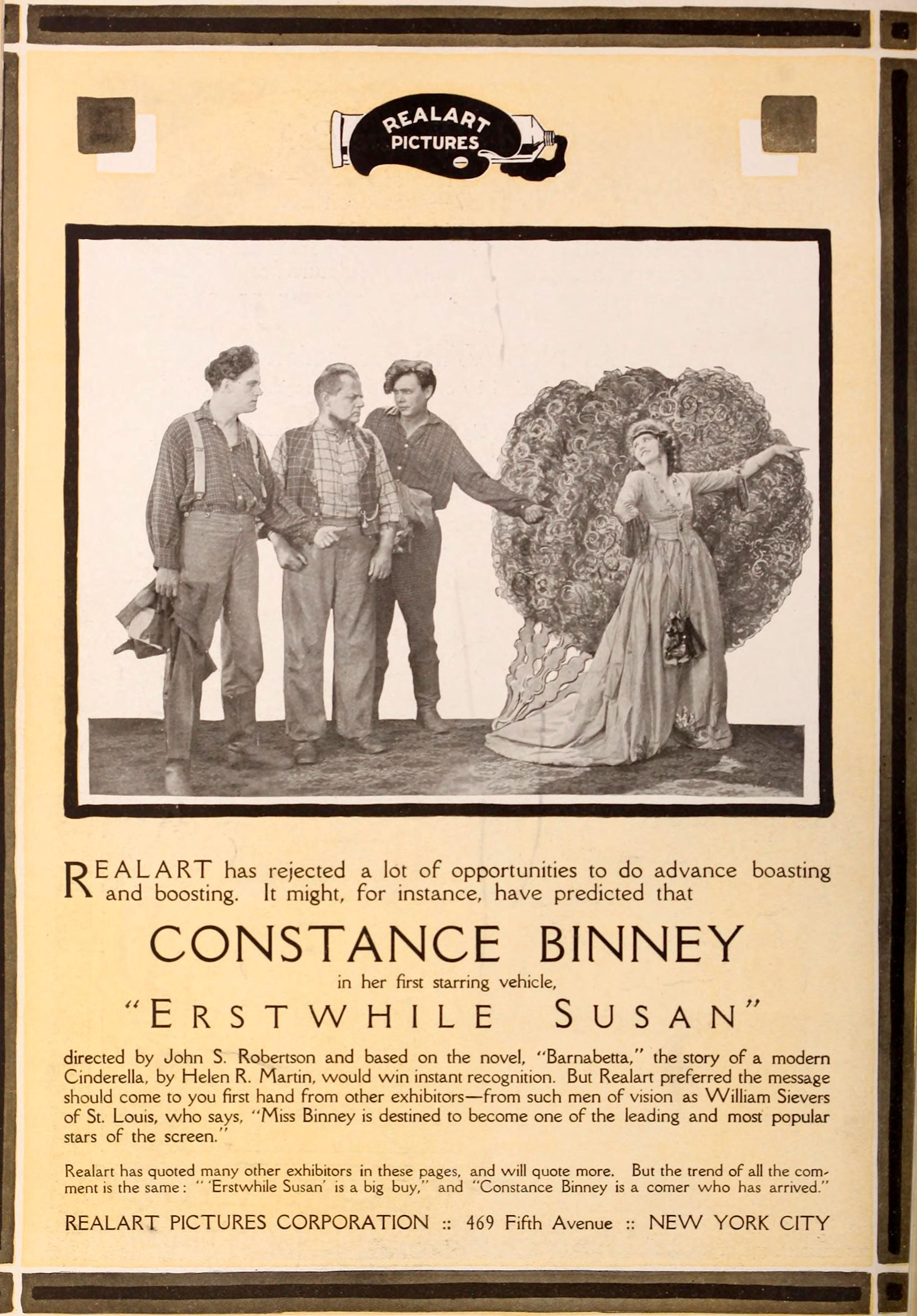
- Advertisement for the film
- Directed by: John S. Robertson; Shaw Lovett (assistant director)
- Written by: Kathryn Stuart (writer)
- Based on: Barnabetta by Helen Reimensnyder Martin
- Produced by: Realart Pictures
- Starring: Constance Binney; Mary Alden
- Cinematography: Roy Overbaugh
- Distributed by: Realart Pictures
- Release date: November 16, 1919
- Running time: 6 reels (1639.02 meters)
- Country: United States
- Language: Silent (English intertitles)

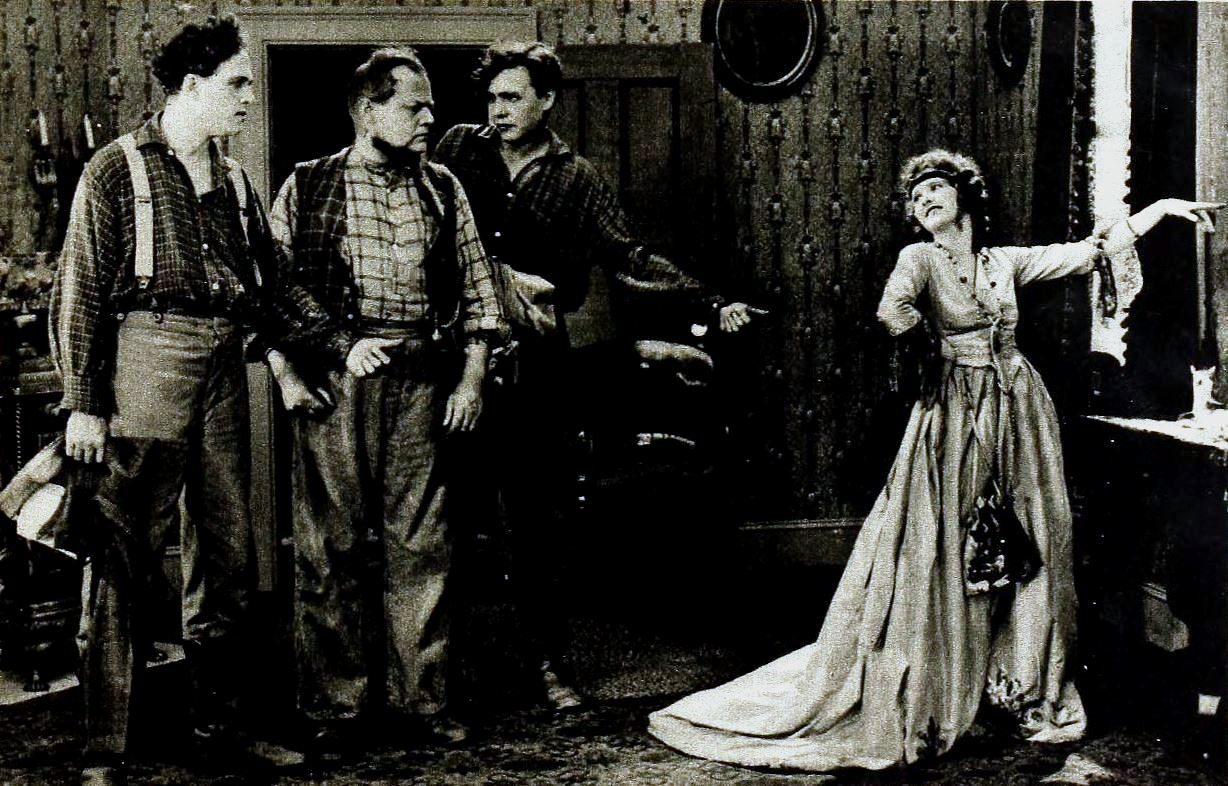
Scene from the film featuring (left to right) Bradley Barker, Anders Randolf, George Renavent, Mary Alden

Erstwhile Susan is a 1919 American silent drama film directed by John S. Robertson, produced and distributed by Realart Pictures. It is based on a 1914 novel Barnabetta by Helen Reimensnyder Martin and later Broadway play Erstwhile Susan by Marian De Forest. Minnie Maddern Fiske starred in the Broadway play in 1916. This film version stars Mary Alden and Constance Binney, then an up-and-coming young actress. This film version, once thought to be lost, survives at the Museum of Modern Art.

Erstwhile Susan was the first film by Realart Films, Adolph Zukor's offshoot affiliate of his Famous Players–Lasky enterprise.

== Plot ==
As described in an adoption in the November 1919 issue of the film magazine Shadowland, Barnabetta dreams of furthering her education, but her Mennonite father Jacob disapproves. Jacob later marries Erstwhile Susan, who has money and changes the family relationships, and sends Barnabetta to college. After graduation, she helps David Jordan run for the Senate, who then professes his love for her.

== Cast ==
- Constance Binney as Barnabetta Dreary
- Jere Austin as David Jordan
- Alfred Hickman as Dr. Edgar Barrett
- Mary Alden as Erstwhile Susan
- Anders Randolf as Barnaby Dreary
- Georges Renavent as Emanuel Dreary
- Bradley Barker as Jacob Dreary
- Leslie Hunt as Albert Buchter
- Clare Verdera (unidentified, uncredited role)

== Preservation ==
A copy of the film survives at the Museum of Modern Art. Erstwhile Susan is the only Constance Binney film that survives in a complete form. All of her other work has been lost except for a single reel from First Love (1921).
