= The Accidental Honeymoon =

1918 film

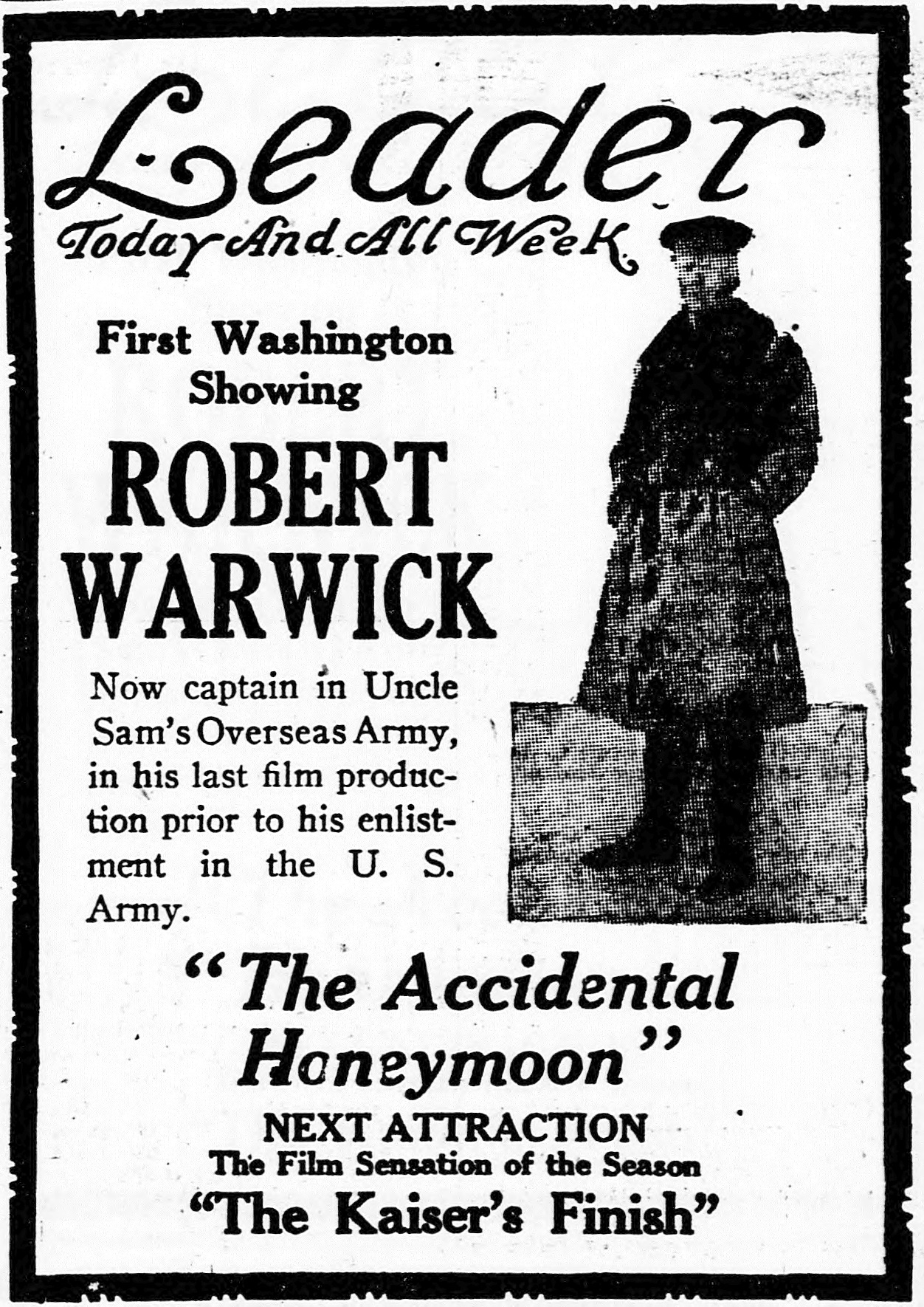
- Newspaper advertisement
- Directed by: Léonce Perret
- Written by: Leonce Perret; Tom Bret (titles)
- Produced by: High Art Productions; Harry Rapf
- Starring: Robert Warwick
- Cinematography: Lawrence E. Williams (credited as Larry Williams)
- Distributed by: State's Rights; Wick War Film Corporation
- Release date: April 1918
- Running time: 50 minutes
- Country: United States
- Language: Silent (English intertitles)

The Accidental Honeymoon is a 1918 American silent comedy-drama film directed by Léonce Perret and starring Robert Warwick.

A fragment of the film remains with only a single reel of the 5 reel film existing at the Library of Congress.

== Plot ==
As described in a film magazine, because his fiancée has deceived him, Robert Courtland decides to end his own life. He tries to shoot himself but is interrupted by the telephone. His next attempt is to be beneath the wheels of a fast train. After he has been resting peacefully some time on a carpet and cushion waiting for the train, Kitty Grey, escaping from an undesirable marriage, calls on Robert for help in fixing her automobile. Robert decides then that he does not want to die after all. They find themselves in an embarrassing position when rain forces them to seek shelter at a farmhouse, and the kindly farmers take them for man and wife. The next day the irate Mr. Gray locates his runaway daughter and puts her in a girls' school, where Robert finds her. With the assistance of a teacher who has loved and lost, Robert and Kitty carry their elopement to a successful finish.

== Cast ==
- Robert Warwick as Robert Courtland
- Elaine Hammerstein as Kitty Grey
- Frank McGlynn, Sr. as Farmer Perkins
- Blanche Craig as Mother Perkins
- Frank Norcross as Kitty's Father
- Edward Kimball as Roland Edwards
- Jeanne Méa as Seminar Principal (credited as Madame Mea)
- Emily Lorraine as Teacher
- Walter Hiers as Jimmy
