= Blanche Craig =

American actress

- Born: January 6, 1866; Cutler, Maine, U.S.
- Died: September 23, 1940 (aged 74); Hollywood, California, U.S.

Blanche Craig (January 6, 1866 – September 23, 1940) was an American actress.

== Biography ==
Blanche Craig was born on January 6, 1866, in Cutler, Maine. She appeared in films such as The City of Illusion (1916), The Accidental Honeymoon (1918), The Magic Cup (1921), and Darkened Rooms (1929). She died on September 23, 1940, in Hollywood, California.

== Partial filmography ==
- The Dawn of a Tomorrow (1915)
- The Rise of Jennie Cushing (1917)
- The Accidental Honeymoon (1918)
- Come on In (1918)
- The Magic Cup (1921)
- Room and Board (1921)
- The Good Provider (1922)
- Modern Marriage (1923)
- Monsieur Beaucaire (1924)
- Two Shall Be Born (1924)
- The Making of O'Malley (1925)
- The Wrongdoers (1925)
- The Police Patrol (1925)
- Then Came the Woman (1926)
- Beyond London Lights (1928)
- The Wright Idea (1928)
- Darkened Rooms (1929)
- Dynamite (1929) (uncredited)
