= Princess Jones =

1921 film

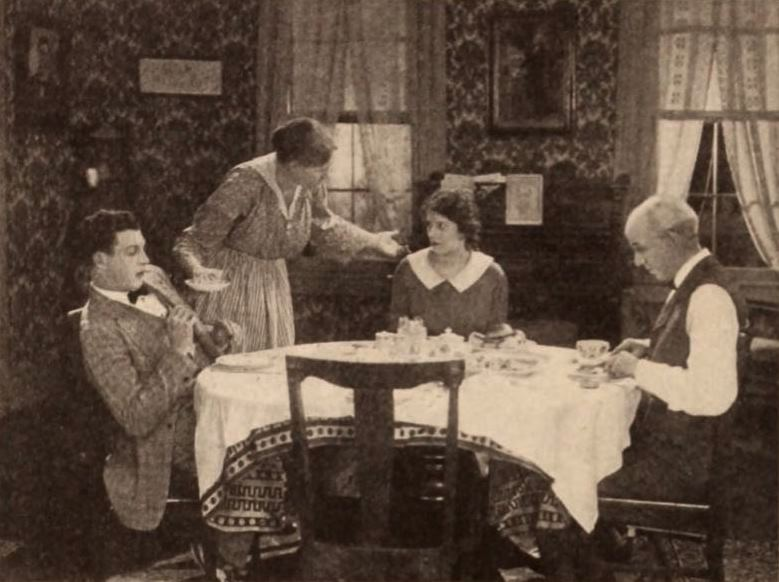
- Directed by: Gustav von Seyffertitz
- Written by: Joseph F. Poland (story); Sam Taylor; A. Van Buren Powell
- Starring: Alice Calhoun; Vincent Coleman; Helen Dubois
- Cinematography: Vincent Scully
- Production company: Vitagraph Company of America
- Distributed by: Vitagraph Company of America
- Release date: January 1921
- Running time: 50 minutes
- Country: United States
- Languages: Silent; English intertitles

Princess Jones is a 1921 American silent comedy film directed by Gustav von Seyffertitz and starring Alice Calhoun, Vincent Coleman and Helen Dubois.

== Plot ==
Princess Jones, the niece of a country store keeper, dreams of being a wealthy, glamorous lady. While at an luxurious nearby resort she meets the wealthy Arthur Forbes, who falls in love with her and buys her an expensive coat. This leads her to be mistaken by the other guests as a Balkan princess and attracts the eye of a gang of kidnappers.

== Cast ==
- Alice Calhoun as Princess Jones
- Vincent Coleman as Arthur Forbes
- Helen Dubois as Matilda Cotton
- Robert Lee Keeling as Roger Arlington
- Robert Gaillard as Detective Carey
- Joseph Burke as Jed Bramson
- Sadie Mullen as Tessa

== Bibliography ==
- Connelly, Robert B. The Silents: Silent Feature Films, 1910-36, Volume 40, Issue 2. December Press, 1998.
- Munden, Kenneth White. The American Film Institute Catalog of Motion Pictures Produced in the United States, Part 1. University of California Press, 1997.
