= The Stolen Kiss =

1920 film by Kenneth Webb

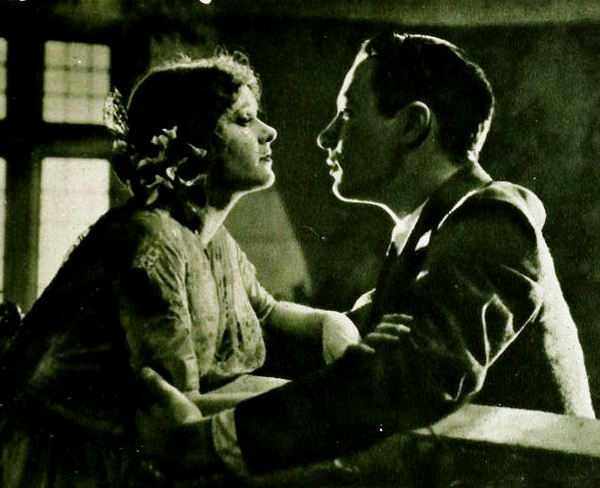
- Still with Binney and La Rocque
- Directed by: Kenneth Webb
- Written by: Kathryn Stuart (scenario)
- Based on: Little Miss By-the-Day by Lucille Baldwin Van Slyke
- Starring: Constance Binney
- Cinematography: George J. Folsey
- Production company: Realart
- Distributed by: Realart
- Release date: April 4, 1920
- Running time: 50 minutes
- Country: United States
- Language: Silent (English intertitles)

The Stolen Kiss is a 1920 American silent romance drama film starring Constance Binney. Kenneth Webb directed. The Realart Company, an affiliate of Paramount Pictures, produced the film. A print is preserved at the British Film Institute, London.

== Plot ==
As described in a film magazine, very natural and impulsive Felicia Day, kept by a watchful governess and vigilant grandfather within walls that surround her home, makes the acquaintance of but one boy, Dudley Hamilt, who sings in the choir of the church next door. Years pass and he returns as a young man, again to meet Felicia over the garden wall, at which time they kiss impulsively only to be separated by her grandparent. Years pass and her grandparent dies, so she returns as an old fashioned maiden to the city. Forced to make her living by sewing, she has many adventures but is always trying to locate her ideal, Dudley. He, meanwhile, searches for her with equal ardor. The film concludes with their meeting and the pledging of their troth.

== Cast ==
- Constance Binney as Felicia Day/Octavia, her Mother
- Rod La Rocque as Dudley Hamilt
- George Backus as Maj. Trenton
- Bradley Barker as John Ralph
- Robert Schable as Allen Graemer
- Frank Losee as Peter Alden
- Richard Carlyle as James Burrell
- Edyna Davies as Dulcie
- Ada Neville as Mlle. D'Ormy (credited as Ada Nevil)
- Agnes Everett as Marthy
- Eddie Fetherston as Jack Hall
- Jean Lamb as Mrs. Hall
- Joseph Latham as Tom Stone
