= Room and Board (film) =

1921 film

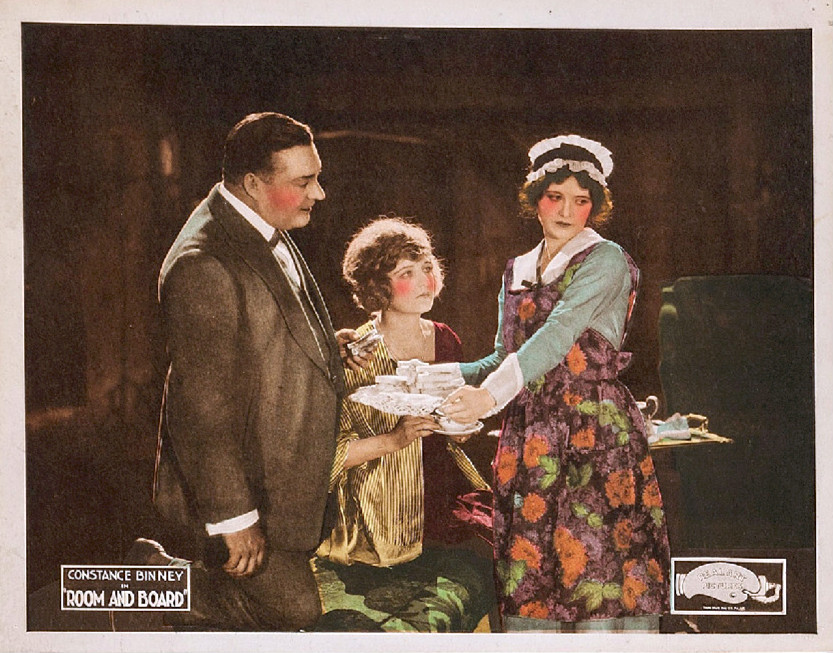
- Lobby card
- Directed by: Alan Crosland
- Screenplay by: Donnah Darrell (scenario); Charles E. Whittaker
- Starring: Constance Binney; Thomas Carrigan; Malcolm Bradley; Arthur Housman; Jed Prouty; Blanche Craig
- Cinematography: George J. Folsey
- Production company: Realart Pictures Corporation
- Distributed by: Paramount Pictures
- Release date: August 17, 1921
- Running time: 50 minutes
- Country: United States
- Language: Silent (English intertitles)

Room and Board is a lost 1921 American silent drama film directed by Alan Crosland and written by Donnah Darrell and Charles E. Whittaker. The film stars Constance Binney, Thomas Carrigan, Malcolm Bradley, Arthur Housman, Jed Prouty, and Blanche Craig. The film was released on August 17, 1921, by Paramount Pictures. It is not known whether the film currently survives, and it may be a lost film.

== Cast ==
- Constance Binney as Lady Noreen
- Thomas Carrigan as Terrence O'Brienn
- Malcolm Bradley as Ephraim Roach
- Arthur Housman as Desmond Roach
- Jed Prouty as Robert Osborne
- Blanche Craig as Mary
- Ben Hendricks Jr. as Ryan
- Ellen Cassidy as Leila
- Arthur Barry as The Earl of Kildoran
