= First Love (1921 film) =

1921 film

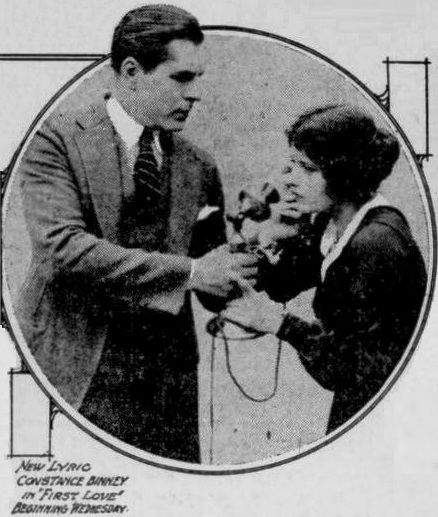
- Ad for film
- Directed by: Maurice Campbell
- Written by: Sonya Levien (story); Percy Heath; Aubrey Staufer
- Produced by: Realart Pictures
- Starring: Constance Binney; Warner Baxter
- Cinematography: H. Kinley Martin
- Production company: Realart Pictures Corporation
- Distributed by: Paramount Pictures
- Release date: December 1921
- Running time: 5 reels
- Country: United States
- Language: Silent (English intertitles)

First Love is a 1921 American silent romantic comedy film produced by the Realart Pictures Corporation and distributed through the related Paramount Pictures. It stars Constance Binney and was directed by Maurice Campbell. Warner Baxter has one of his earliest screen portrayals here. Only the first reel of this film is known to survive at the Museum of Modern Art.

== Plot ==
As described in a film magazine, factory worker Kathleen O'Donnell has fallen in love with ambulance driver Harry Stanton. After her father, Tad O'Donnell, who knows Harry's true character, forbids him in the house, Kathleen leaves home and works overtime at the factory for funds for Harry to complete his medical education, a course of study which exists only in fiction. The efforts of her family and other employees to show her error lead her to quit her factory job and take a job as a stripper at a restaurant, where she sees him dining with his lady friends. Her discovery of his perfidy results in an attack on him that injures his sight. She later has a happy ending as the owner of the factory, Donald Halliday, has an interest in her.

== Cast ==
- Constance Binney as Kathleen O'Donnell
- Warner Baxter as Donald Halliday
- George Webb as Harry Stanton
- Betty Schade as Yvette De Vonne
- George Hernandez as Tad O'Donnell
- Fanny Midgley as Mrs. O'Donnell (credited as Fannie Midgley)
- Edward Jobson as Peter Holliday
- Agnes Adams as Icecream-cone Girl
- Maxine Elliott Hicks as Speeder
- Dorothy Gordon as Elsie Edwards

== Summary in stills ==
The December 24, 1921 issue of Exhibitors Herald illustrated the plot of First Love using a series of twenty numbered stills presented without any explanatory captions. The order of the stills may altered from that of the film since stills 10 and 16 appear to be from the same scene (the apron may indicate that these are from when she was working as a waitress at a restaurant) and 9 and 19 show Binney sitting with the same hair style.

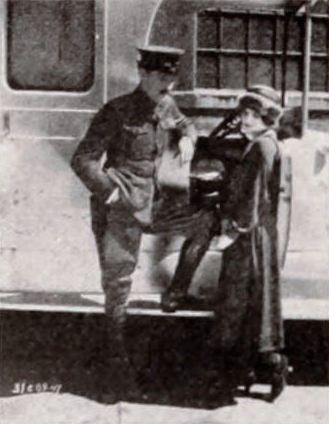
Still 1

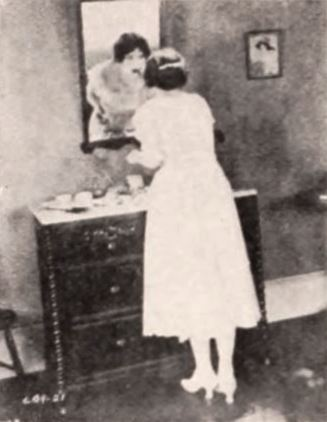
Still 2

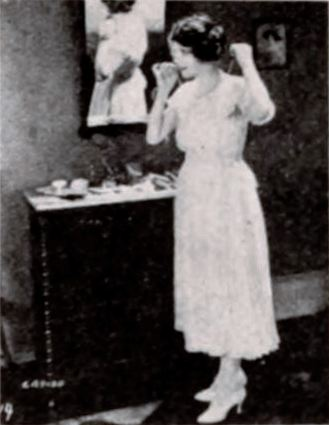
Still 3

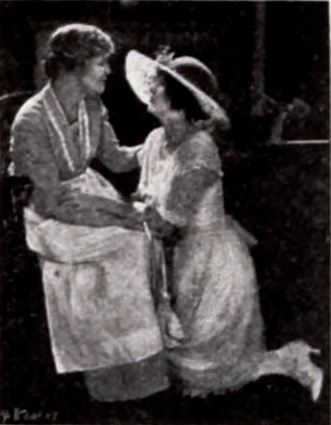
Still 4

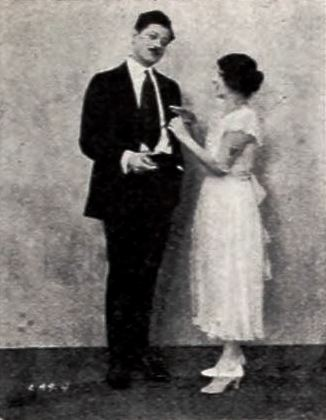
Still 5

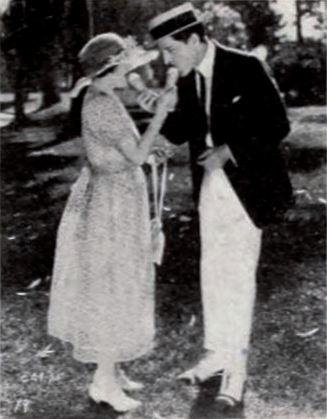
Still 6

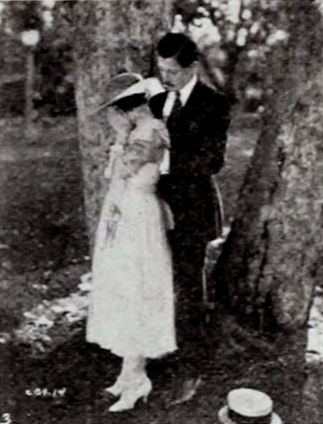
Still 7

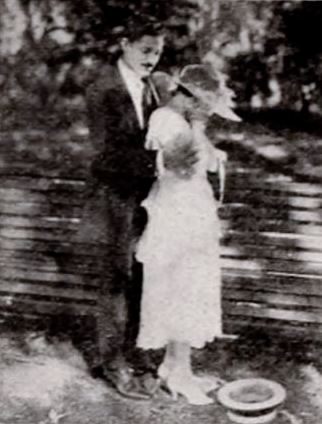
Still 8

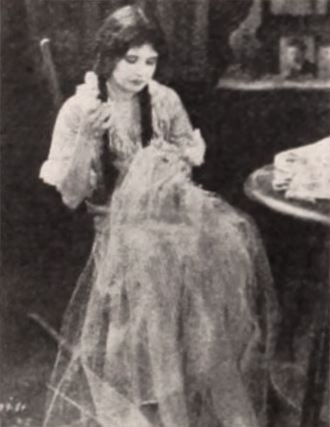
Still 9

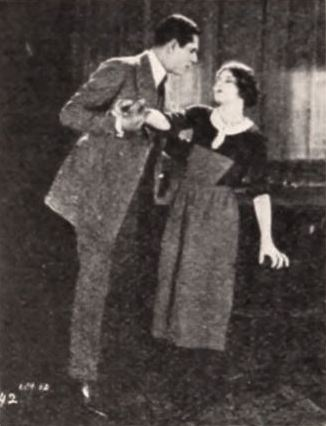
Still 10

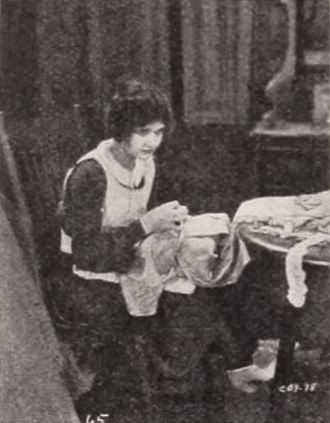
Still 11

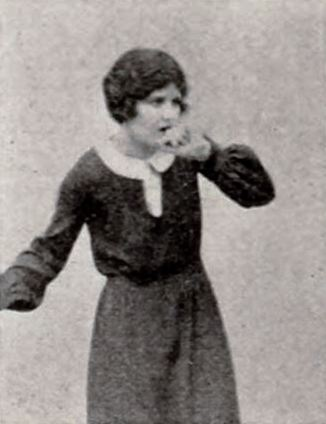
Still 12

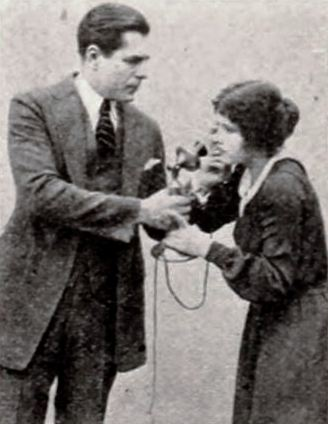
Still 13

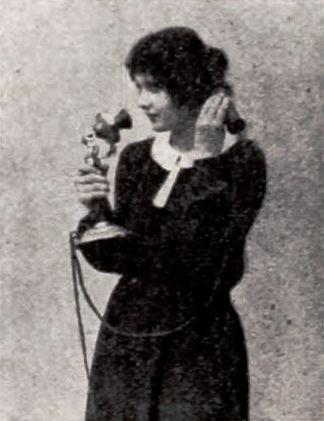
Still 14

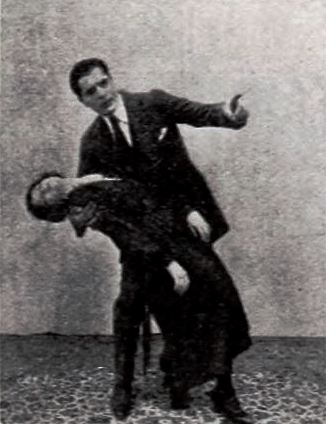
Still 15

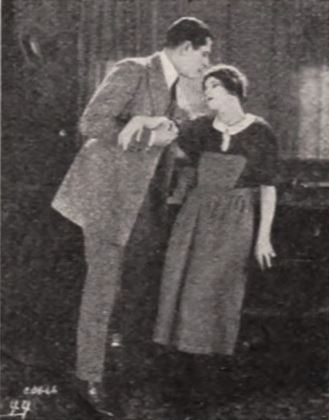
Still 16

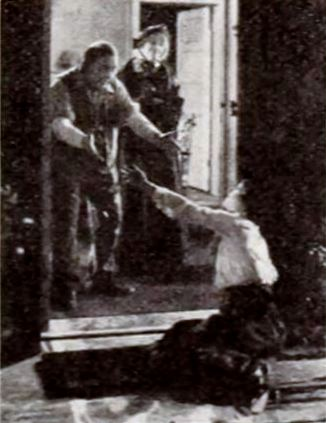
Still 17

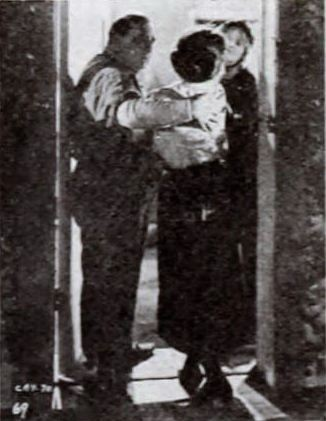
Still 18

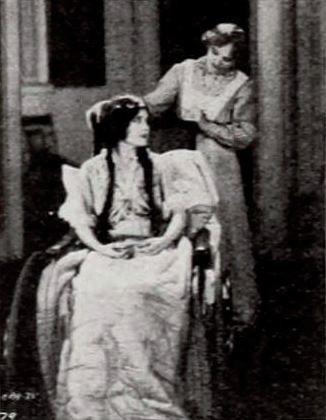
Still 19

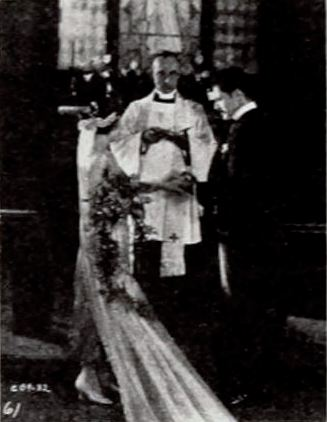
Still 20
