= Rose of the Alley =

1916 film by Charles Horan

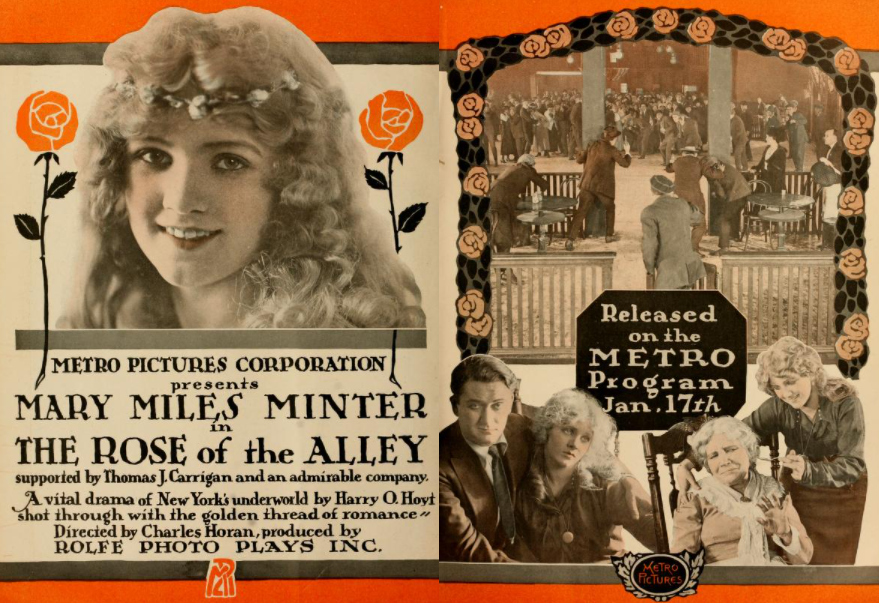
- 1916 advertisement
- Directed by: Charles Horan
- Written by: Harry O. Hoyt; Jackie Saunders
- Starring: Mary Miles Minter
- Distributed by: Metro Pictures
- Release date: January 17, 1916 (United States)
- Running time: 5 reels
- Country: United States
- Languages: Silent; English intertitles

Rose of the Alley is a 1916 silent crime drama film directed by Charles Horan and starring Mary Miles Minter.

This film is extant at George Eastman House, Rochester, New York.

== Plot ==
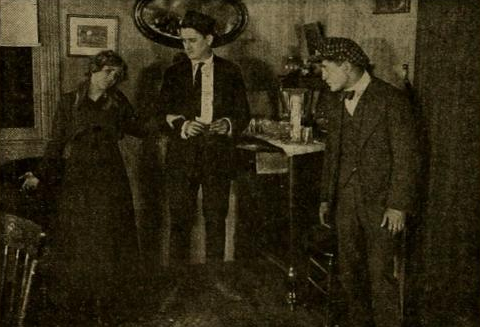
Still from "Rose of the Alley" (1916)

The plot is detailed in The Moving Picture World magazine as follows:

Tom Drogan, addicted to gambling and drink, is the object of a good mother's devotion. His sister, Nell, is much more susceptible to her mother's good teachings, and has grown like a flower among weeds, with a great affection for both and an innocence that marks her apart entirely from her surroundings. One of Tom's drunken escapades so affects his mother that in her efforts to get him to their tenement room she is attacked with heart trouble which proves fatal. Her dying words are to Nell to be patient with Tom. He has been sent by Nell for the doctor and in his inebriate condition has forgotten all about the ill mother, and has been induced to go into a saloon and indulge further, finally remembering his errand and bringing the physician too late.

Tom brings Kid Hogan to the flat some days later to pay him a gambling debt. A dispute leads to the shooting of Hogan through the forearm and his brother, a cheap ward politician and plain-clothes man in the police department, hears the shot from the street, meets Tom, as he tries to get away, and is about to arrest him when Tom charges Hogan with having tried to assault Nell. Although Hogan knows he is innocent, he realizes the gravity of the charge and tells his brother to let Tom go - he'll get even. Nell assents to the charge her brother makes to shield him and Hogan decides he will get a woman associate of his who lives in the next apartment, to frame-up the girl.

Hogan and two of his friends try to shoot Tom from a roof, but miss him. The girl, Mamie, then sets about getting Nell in the toils - asks her to go with her to buy a hat. On their way Mamie accosts two men, and Hogan's brother, who is conveniently near, arrests Nell, making no attempt to catch the fleeing Mamie. Frank Roberts, Nell's suitor, happens on the scene and pilots her safely through the affair. Meanwhile Tom has heard of the framing-up of Nell, and seeks Hogan, whom he knows is at the bottom of it. He finds him, with his girl, in a cheap dance hall, and there their respective gangs engage in a fight, in which several guerrillas are killed, while others make spectacular getaways.

In this fracas Tom is mortally wounded, while Hogan is killed. Tom gets to their flat, just before Frank and Nell arrive from the station house. Tom's dying words to Nell are: "don't let 'em get me, sis. Bar the door." While the pursuing officers are hammering the door in, Tom drops the revolver, and Nell picks it up, crazed with the single thought of protecting her brother, just as she had promised her mother to do. Just as the officers break in the door Frank knocks her revolver up as she fires. It is too late - the brother is dead.

== Cast ==
- Mary Miles Minter as Nell Drogan
- Danny Hogan as 'Kid' Hogan
- Frederick Heck as Dan Hogan
- Geraldine Berg as Mamie
- Alan Edwards as Frank Roberts
- Thomas Carrigan as Tom Drogan

== Reception ==
Like many American films of the time, Rose of the Alley was subject to cuts by city and state film censorship boards. The Chicago Board of Censors ordered cut scenes from Reel 1 of a shooting, from Reel 2 the signaling from man on roof to man on street, shooting from the roof, and a vision of a gun fight in a saloon, and from Reel 5 fourteen gun fight and shooting scenes and two scenes of struggle between man and girl.
