= Such a Little Queen (1921 film) =

1921 film

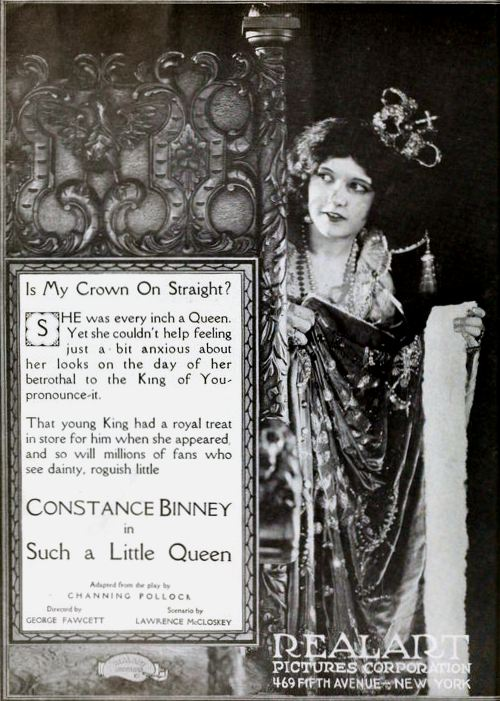
- Ad for film
- Directed by: George Fawcett
- Written by: Lawrence McCloskey; J. Clarkson Miller
- Based on: Such a Little Queen by Channing Pollock
- Produced by: Realart Pictures
- Starring: Constance Binney
- Cinematography: Ernest Haller
- Distributed by: Paramount Pictures
- Release date: July 1921 (USA)
- Running time: 5 reels; 4,942 feet
- Country: United States
- Language: Silent (English intertitles)

Such a Little Queen is a 1921 American silent film drama starring Constance Binney and directed by George Fawcett, who usually appeared in front of the camera as a character actor. This film is a remake of the 1914 film of the same name which served as an early feature length vehicle for Mary Pickford who had recently arrived at Adolph Zukor's Famous Players studio. The source material for both films was the 1909 Broadway play by Channing Pollock that starred Elsie Ferguson in a breakout stage role. It is not known whether the 1921 film currently survives.

== Plot ==
As described in a film magazine, a revolution within its borders forces the hasty flight of the little queen, Anne Victoria, to America. She arrives with only her trusted legal adviser Baron Cosaco and they take quarters in the tenement district. The king of the neighboring principality, Stephen of Hetland, to whom she is betrothed, also flees to America. He, too, is in reduced circumstance and they both accept employment in the office of a large meat packer. Its owner, Adolph Lawton, has just returned from Europe where he was trying to find a titled husband for his daughter Elizabeth. The general manager of the office falls in love with the little queen. The ex-king is accused of stealing some bonds, but is freed of the charge when the real thief is captured. The king and queen return to their respective countries and thrones wedding bells sounding in the distance.

== Cast ==
- Constance Binney as Anne Victoria of Gzbfernigambia
- Vincent Coleman as Stephen of Hetland
- J. H. Gilmour as Baron Cosaco
- Roy Fernandez as Bob Trainor
- Frank Losee as Adolph Lawton
- Betty Carpenter as Elizabeth Lawton
- Jessie Ralph as Mary (Ralph appeared in the 1909 play)
- Henry Leone as Boris
