= Lucille Baldwin Van Slyke =

American writer (1879–1966)

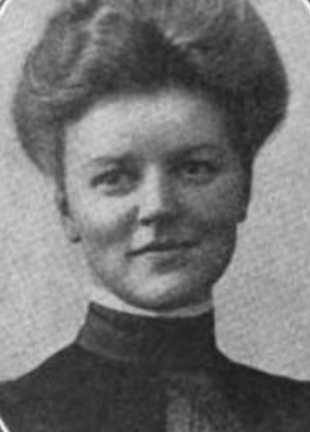
- Lucille Baldwin Van Slyke, from a 1908 advertisement
- Born: Harriet Lucille Baldwin; September 28, 1879; Mannsville, New York
- Died: January 20, 1966; Norwalk, Connecticut
- Occupation: Writer
- Notable work: Eve's Other Children (1912), Little Miss By-the-day (1919), Nora Pays (1925)

Harriet Lucille Baldwin Van Slyke (September 28, 1879 – January 20, 1966) was an American writer.

== Early life ==
Lucille Baldwin was born in Mannsville, New York, the daughter of William Edward Baldwin and Hannah Jeanette Fish Baldwin. Her father was a newspaperman. She graduated from Syracuse University in 1902.

== Career ==
Books by Van Slyke include Eve's Other Children (1912), Little Miss By-the-day (1919), and Nora Pays (1925). She also wrote novel-length stories for serialized publication in newspapers, including The Newlywed Lindsays (1921), Brides Will Be Brides (1922) The Match that Merry Made (1922), Just Like a Woman (1924), The Social Climber: Love Story of a Schoolma'am (1925), and Playing with Fire (1926). She wrote dozens of short stories, for magazines including McClure's, Collier's, and Pearson's.

Van Slyke was known for her popular stories and books about Syrian immigrants in Brooklyn, often centered on a child character named Nazileh and her family. "No one can lay down this book without feeling that there are exquisite qualities lurking in the Syrian quarters, qualities that we as a people need," wrote Mary Bannister Willard in a review of Van Slyke's Eve's Other Children. The Bookman columnist Ina Carrington Cabell said in 1912 that "it is borne upon us that such vital happenings, such real people, must be true and alive".

The silent films The Stolen Kiss (1920) and Brides Will Be Brides (1926) were based on a stories by Van Slyke. "The Haze of the Honeymoon" (1908) was adapted for radio performance in 1943.

== Selected stories by Lucille Baldwin Van Slyke ==
- "Peachy H.S." (1908, American Magazine)
- "His Famous Deed" (1908, American Magazine)
- "Second Fiddle" (1908, Hampton's Broadway Magazine)
- "The Haze of the Honeymoon" (1908, New Broadway Magazine)
- "Jack's First Concert" (1908, syndicated in newspapers)
- "Goldilocks" (1909, Hampton's Magazine)
- "Exclusive" (1909, Appleton's Magazine)
- "The King's Messenger and the Pink Soap" (1909, Red Book)
- "The Housetop" (1910, The Craftsman)
- "The Dinner Pail" (1910, The Craftsman)
- "The Dazzler" (1911, Red Book)
- "The Cat and the Crusader" (1911, Red Book)
- "Rug of Her Fathers" (1911, McClure's)
- "Rodania the Magic Mare" (1911, McClure's)
- "Dreams in Lace" (1911, McClure's)
- "Ten Pieces of Silver" (1911, McClure's)
- "The Camel of Bethlehem" (1911, McClure's)
- "The Tooth of Antar" (1911, McClure's)
- "The Peddler" (1912, American Magazine)
- "The Gift of Tongues" (1912, McClure's)
- "The Thing Called Play" (1912, Current Literature)
- "The Fountain of Joy" (1912, The Craftsman)
- "The Castle of Comfort" (1914, Everybody's)
- "General Merry Sunshine" (1916, Collier's)
- "What Aunt Theodora Wanted" (1916, Pearson's)

== Personal life ==
Lucille Baldwin married fellow Syracuse alumnus George Martin Van Slyke, a newspaper editor, in 1903. He died in 1961. She died in 1966, aged 85 years, at a hospital in Norwalk, Connecticut.
