= Constance Binney =

American actress and dancer (1896–1989)

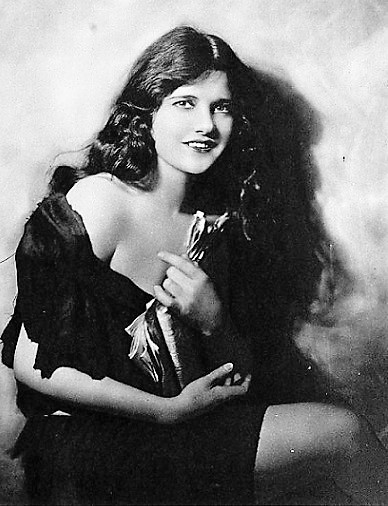
- Born: June 28, 1896; New York City, U.S.
- Died: November 15, 1989 (aged 93); New York City, U.S.
- Occupation: Actress
- Spouses: Charles Edward Cotting, Jr. (m. 1926; div. 1932) Henry Wharton, Jr. (m. 1932; div. 1935) Leonard Cheshire (m. 1941; div. 1951)
- Relatives: Faire Binney (sister)

Constance Binney (June 28, 1896 – November 15, 1989) was an American stage and film actress and dancer.

== Biography ==
Born in New York City, Binney was educated at Westover School, a private college preparatory boarding school for girls in Middlebury, Connecticut, and in Paris, France. Her father, Harold Osgood Binney and her mother, Gertrude Miles, were both from wealthy and socially connected families. A maternal uncle was Basil Miles, an American diplomat to Russia during the presidency of Woodrow Wilson. In 1934, she told a newspaper reporter, "I was born a society wench, and I've resented it ever since."

She made her Broadway theatre debut in Saturday to Monday (1917) and the following year appeared with her actress sister, Faire Binney, in the Maurice Tourneur silent film, Sporting Life, her film debut. In 1919, she starred opposite John Barrymore in The Test of Honor. Her other Broadway credits included Oh, Lady! Lady! (1918), 39 East (1919), and Sweet Little Devil (1924).

Modern assessment of her career is limited as most of her films are now lost, with only two of her films surviving in a complete form, Erstwhile Susan and The Case of Becky, along with a single reel of First Love.

Binney married Charles Edward Cotting, Jr, a Boston banker, in Old Lyme, Connecticut in 1926. They divorced in 1932. Two months later, she married Henry Wharton, Jr., at city hall in New York City. Wharton was a prominent Philadelphia attorney. That marriage also ended in divorce.

Binney last performed on Broadway in 1924. She appeared on stage in London and in 1941, during the Second World War, married the British Royal Air Force pilot, Geoffrey Leonard Cheshire, later, Baron Cheshire, who was twenty years her junior. However, the marriage was childless, and the couple were estranged after the war ended, divorcing in 1951.

== Death ==
Binney died in 1989 in Queens, New York City, aged 93.

== Legacy ==
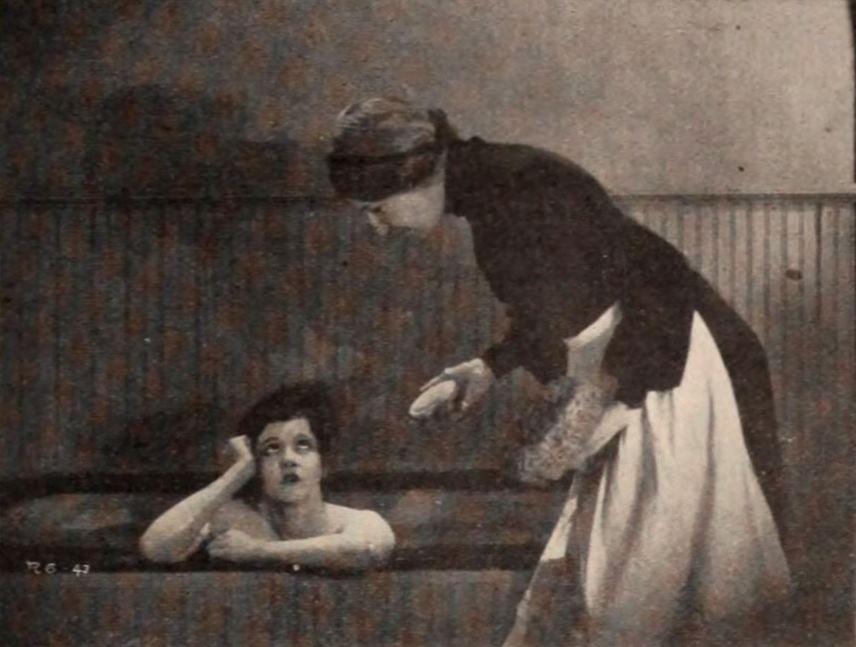
The Stolen Kiss (1920)

Binney has a star on the Hollywood Walk of Fame, located on the 6300 block of Hollywood Boulevard.

== Filmography ==
Film poster

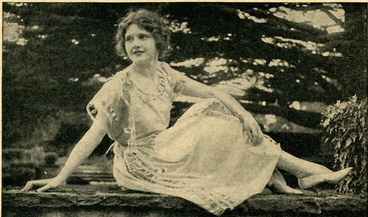
A Bill of Divorcement (1922)

Year	Title	Role	Notes	Ref.
1918	The Sporting Life	Norah Cavanagh	Lost film	
1919	The Test of Honor	Juliett Hollis	Lost film	
1919	Erstwhile Susan	Barnabetta Dreary		
1919	The Stolen Kiss	Felicia Day / Octavia, her Mother		
1920	39 East	Penelope Penn	Lost film	
1920	Something Different	Alice Lea	Lost film	
1921	The Magic Cup	Mary Malloy	Lost film	
1921	Such a Little Queen	Anne Victoria Gzbfernigambia	Lost film	
1921	Room and Board	Lady Noreen	Lost film	
1921	The Case of Becky	Dorothy Stone		
1921	First Love	Kathleen O'Donnell	Incomplete film	
1922	Midnight	Edna Morris	Lost film	
1922	The Sleepwalker	Doris Dumond	Lost film	
1922	A Bill of Divorcement	Sidney Fairfield	Lost film	
1923	Three O'Clock in the Morning	Elizabeth Winthrop	Lost film	
