= His Sister's Kids =

1913 film

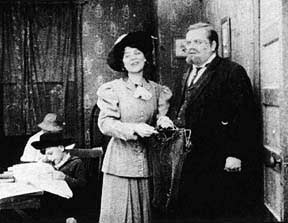
- Directed by: George Nichols
- Produced by: Mack Sennett
- Starring: Fatty Arbuckle
- Production company: Keystone Studios
- Distributed by: Mutual Film
- Release date: December 20, 1913
- Running time: 10 minutes
- Country: United States
- Language: Silent (English intertitles)

His Sister's Kids is a 1913 American silent short comedy film directed by George Nichols and starring Fatty Arbuckle.

== Plot ==
Dr. Jacobs' misbehaving nephews drop a cat down a manhole; the Keystone Cops are called in to rescue the endangered feline.

== Cast ==
- Roscoe "Fatty" Arbuckle: Dr. Jacobs
- Minta Durfee: His Sister
- Ford Sterling: Police Chief
- Jack White: Nephew
- Gordon Griffith: Nephew
- Hank Mann: Cop
- Al St. John: Cop
- Charles Avery: Man with Cane
- Virginia Kirtley: Girl Onlooker
- Rube Miller: Old Man

== Preservation ==
A 35 mm print is held by George Eastman House, gifted by Luigi Pallme in 1998.

== See also ==
- List of American films of 1913
- Roscoe Arbuckle filmography
