= Those Happy Days =

Those Happy Days can refer to:

- Those Happy Days (1914 film), a 1914 silent film
- Those Happy Days (2006 film), a 2006 French film
