= His Chum the Baron =

1913 film

- Directed by: Mack Sennett
- Produced by: Mack Sennett
- Starring: Ford Sterling
- Production company: Keystone Studios
- Distributed by: Mutual Film
- Release date: April 28, 1913
- Country: United States
- Languages: Silent; English intertitles

His Chum the Baron is a 1913 American silent short comedy film directed by Mack Sennett. Harold Lloyd is said to have appeared in this film, but this is unconfirmed.

== Plot ==
According to a film magazine, "Smith's chum is a very poor Baron. Smith and the Baron are invited to a ball, and the Baron, not having evening clothes of his own, "borrows" Smith's dress suit. He is having the time of his life when Smith arrives, thoroughly angry, and taking the Baron in a room takes the clothes away from him. The Baron is in a terrible predicament, dodging around from room to room, as people intrude upon his hiding places. He tries to hide his face with a handkerchief, and a lady catches a glimpse of him as he dives under a bed. She screams in terror, thinking he is a mad man, and then the poor Baron is chased all over the house. Some one telephones for the police and they assist in the capture and lead him away."

== Cast ==
- Ford Sterling
- Hank Mann
- Edgar Kennedy
- Betty Schade
- Vernon Smith
- Harold Lloyd (unconfirmed)

== See also ==
- Harold Lloyd filmography
