= A Game of Pool =

A Game of Pool may refer to:

- A Game of Pool (film), a 1913 American silent film by Mack Sennett
- "A Game of Pool" (The Twilight Zone, 1959), a 1961 episode of The Twilight Zone (original 1959 series)
- "A Game of Pool" (The Twilight Zone, 1985), a 1989 episode of The Twilight Zone (revived 1985 series)

== See also ==
- Pool game (disambiguation)
