= Ford Sterling =

American actor and comedian (1883–1939)

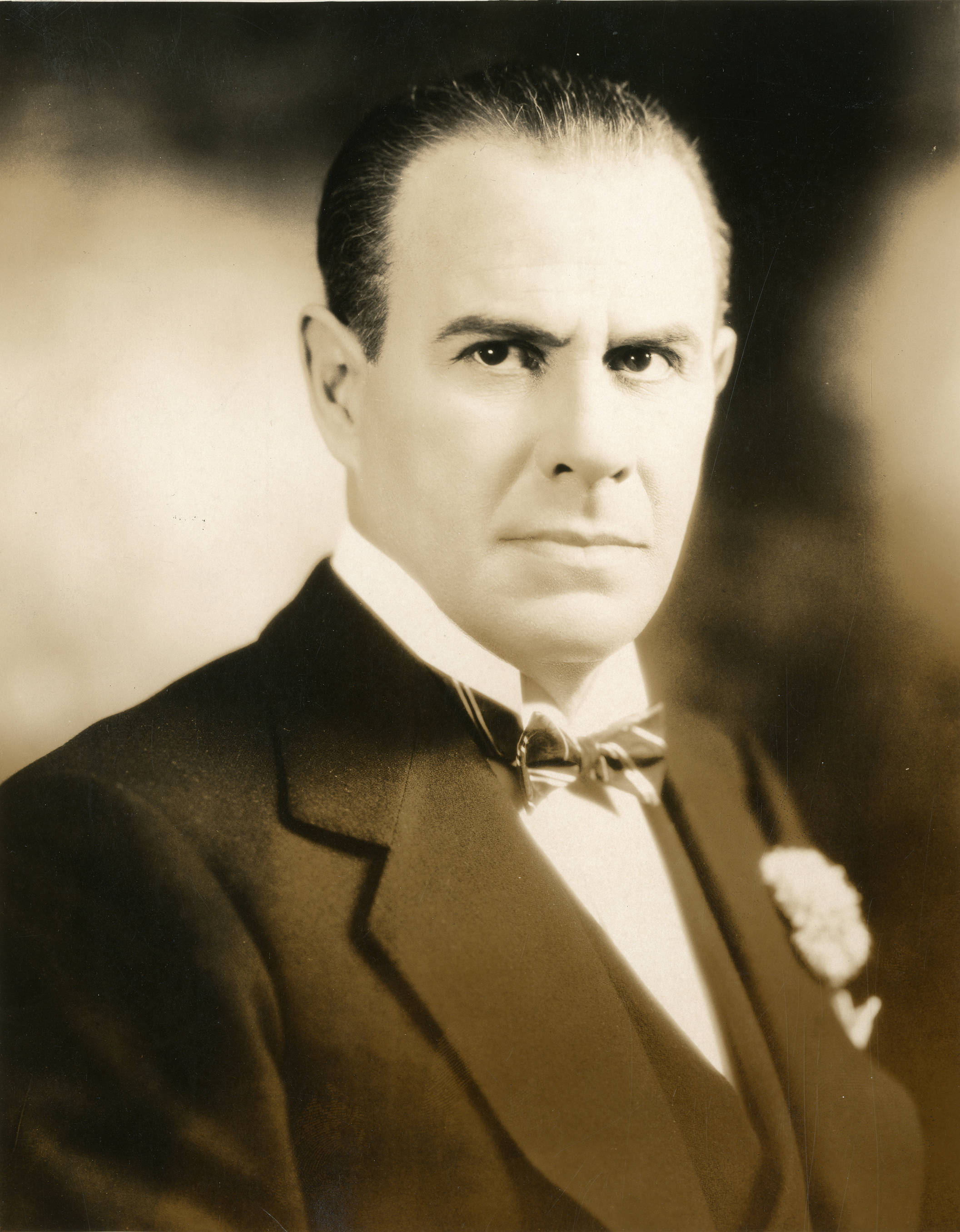
- Sterling in 1926
- Born: George Franklin Stich; November 3, 1883; La Crosse, Wisconsin, U.S.
- Died: October 13, 1939 (aged 55); Los Angeles, California, U.S.
- Resting place: Hollywood Forever Cemetery
- Occupations: Actor; Comedian
- Years active: 1904–1935
- Spouse: Teddy Sampson (m. 1914)

Ford Sterling (born George Franklin Stich; November 3, 1883 – October 13, 1939) was an American comedian and actor best known for his work with Keystone Studios. One of the 'Big 4' Keystone Cops, he was the original chief of the Keystone Cops.

== Early years ==
Sterling was born George Franklin Stich in La Crosse, Wisconsin, on November 3, 1883 to Mary Kirby and George Stitch.

== Career ==
Sterling ran away from home at the age of 12 and joined the George Hutchinson repertory company.

He later joined the Flying Lees circus, working with an aerial act, before joining the Forepaugh Amalgamated Circus to perform as an acrobatic clown for five years. After tiring of the circus, Sterling joined a musical show in New York City, where he became featured, and there Mack Sennett saw him there and offered him a job.

Sterling began his career in silent films in 1911 with Biograph Studios. When Sennett left to set up Keystone Studios in 1912, Sterling followed him. He spent eight years working with Sennett at Keystone Pictures from 1912 to 1920, there, he performed various roles, primarily portrayed police chiefs, such as 'Chief Teeheezel' in the Keystone Cops series of slapstick comedies in a successful career that spanned twenty-five years.

From 1913 and throughout the 1910s, Sterling was among the most popular screen comedians in the world. Charlie Chaplin recalled that, when joining Keystone in early 1914, he was at first dismayed to discover that he was expected to imitate Sterling. Chaplin and Sterling played together at least twice on film, in the one-reelers A Thief Catcher and Between Showers (both 1914).

In the 1920s, Sterling abandoned the short comedy format, instead playing supporting roles in both comedic and dramatic feature-length films, such as He Who Gets Slapped (1924) opposite Lon Chaney. Stering also starred as Michael Poole in Howard Hughes' now lost film Everybody's Acting (1926).

After talking pictures came along, Sterling returned to appearing in short comedies. Making a smooth transition to talking films, Ford Sterling made the last of his more than two hundred and seventy film appearances in 1936.

Sterling was also a renowned amateur photographer, who won many prizes and at one point (in 1924) even had some of his work exhibited at the Louvre.

== Personal life and death ==
Sterling was married to actress Teddy Sampson. He was in a hospital for 18 months prior to his death, and his left leg was amputated above his knee a week before his death. He died on October 13, 1939, of thrombosis (following long-standing diabetes) in Los Angeles, California, and is interred in the Hollywood Forever Cemetery.

For his contribution to the motion picture industry, Sterling has a star on the Hollywood Walk of Fame at 6612 Hollywood Blvd.

== Selected filmography ==
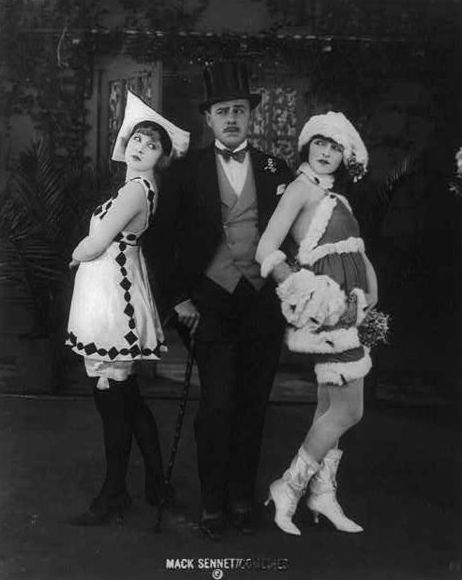
With Marvel Rea and Alice Maison

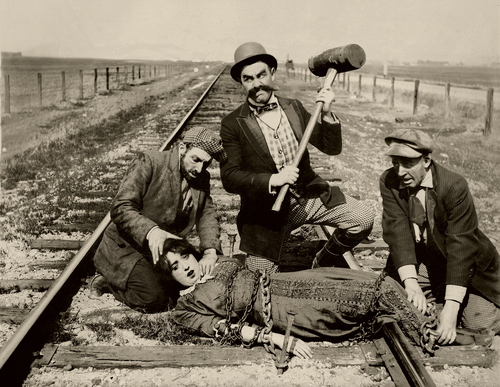
"Barney Oldfield's A Race for a Life" [1913] with left to right:Hank Mann; Ford Sterling; Al St John and in foreground Mabel Normand

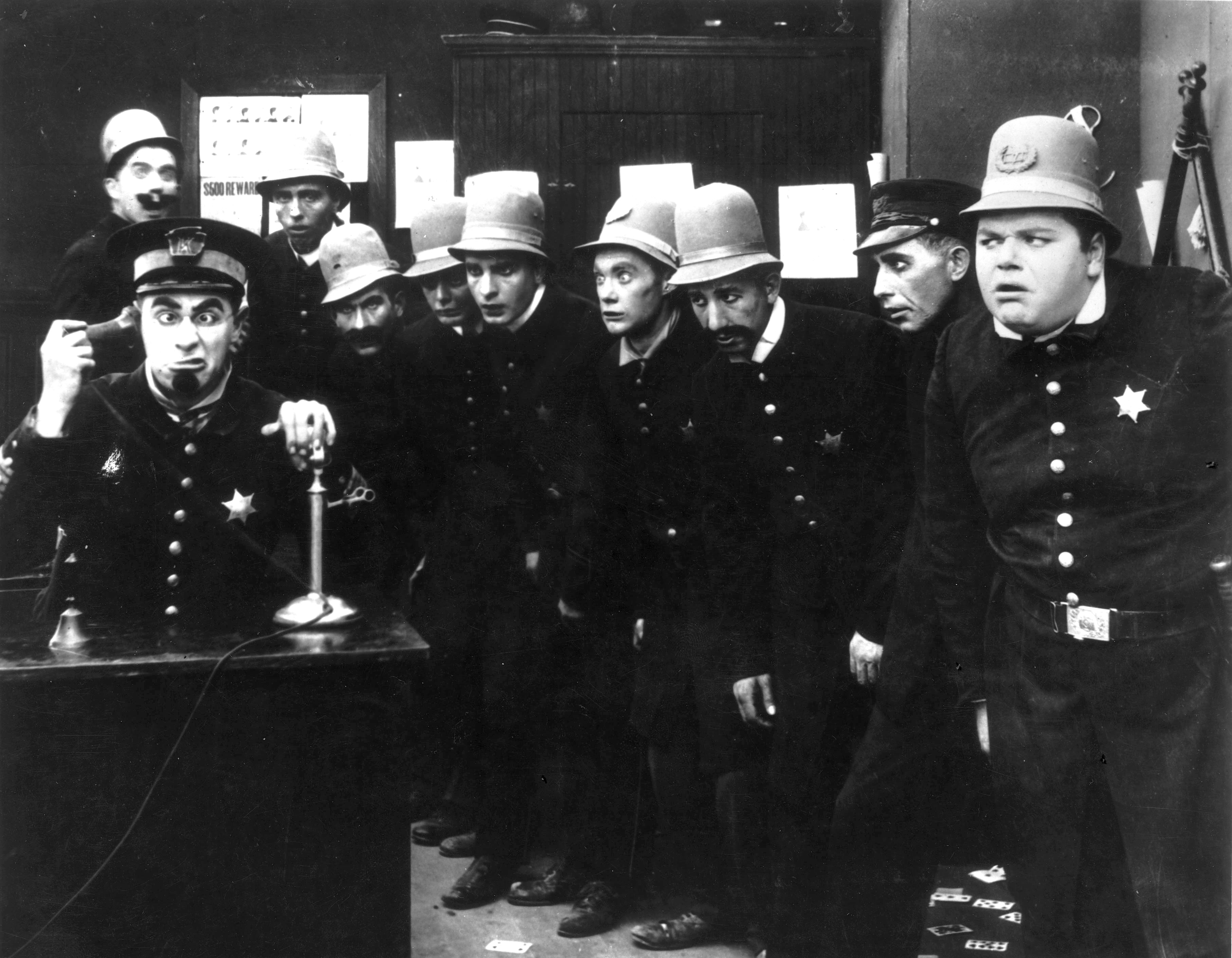
Left:Ford Sterling as Keystone Cops Police chief [seated}; 4th from right: Al St John in "In the Clutches of the Gang (1914)

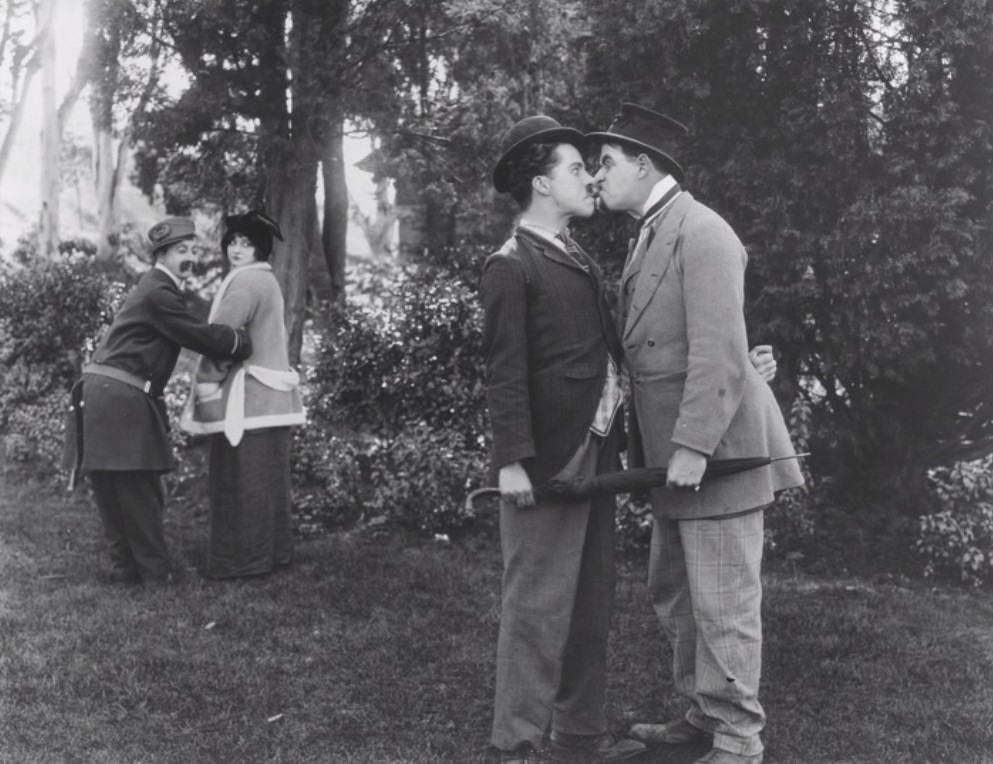
Showing Charlie Chaplin and Ford Sterling with the umbrella and Chester Conklin and Emma Clifton in the background left in "Between Showers" (1914)

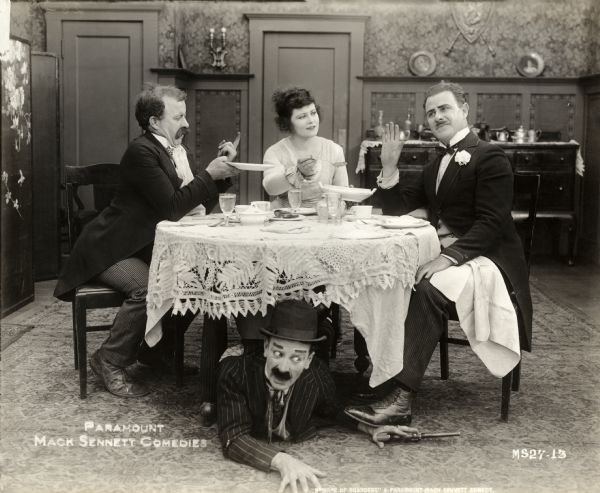
Chester Conklin (left), Mary Thurman (center) and Ford Sterling (right) in the 1918 Mack Sennett comedy Beware of Boarders

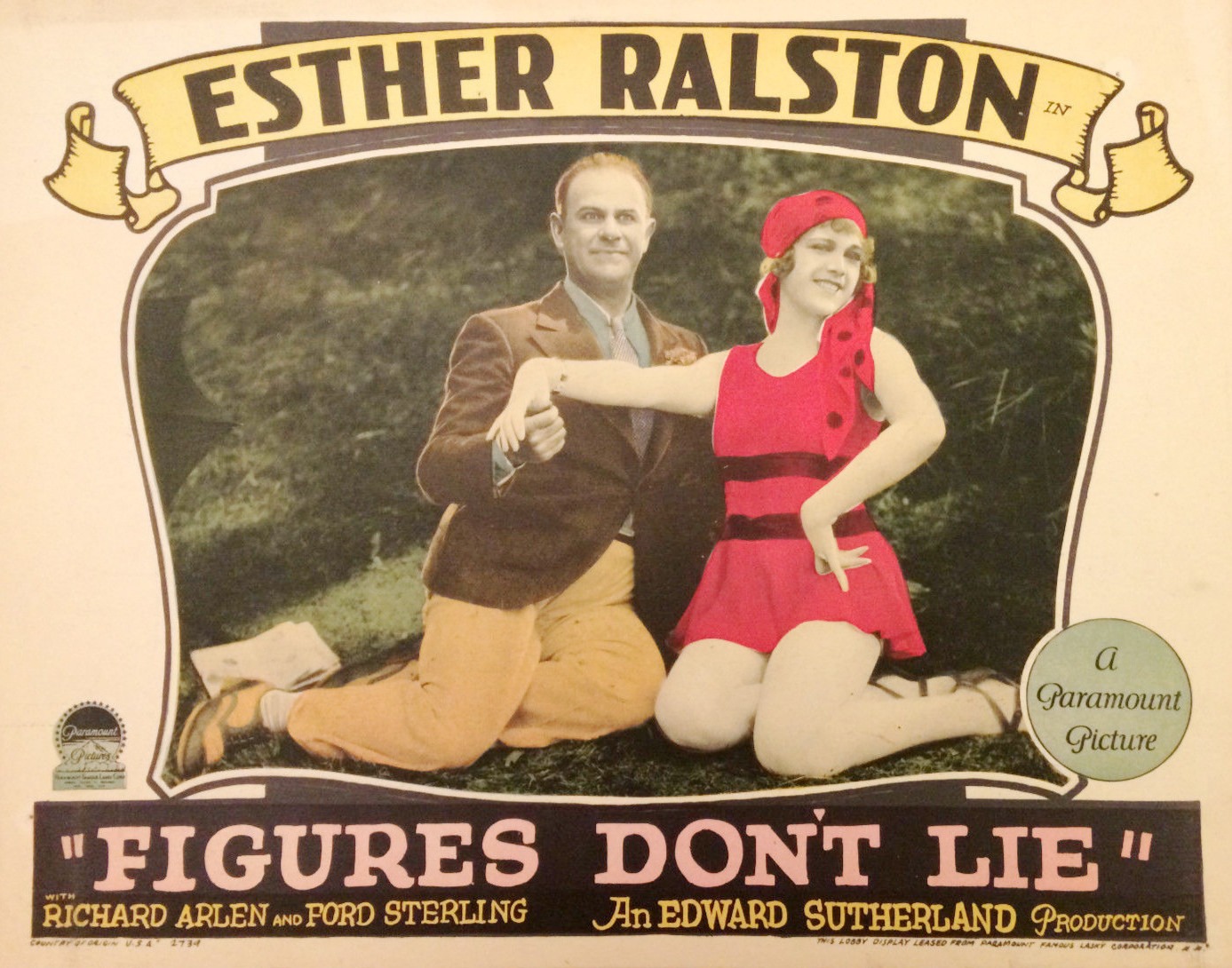
Sterling and Esther Ralston (1927)

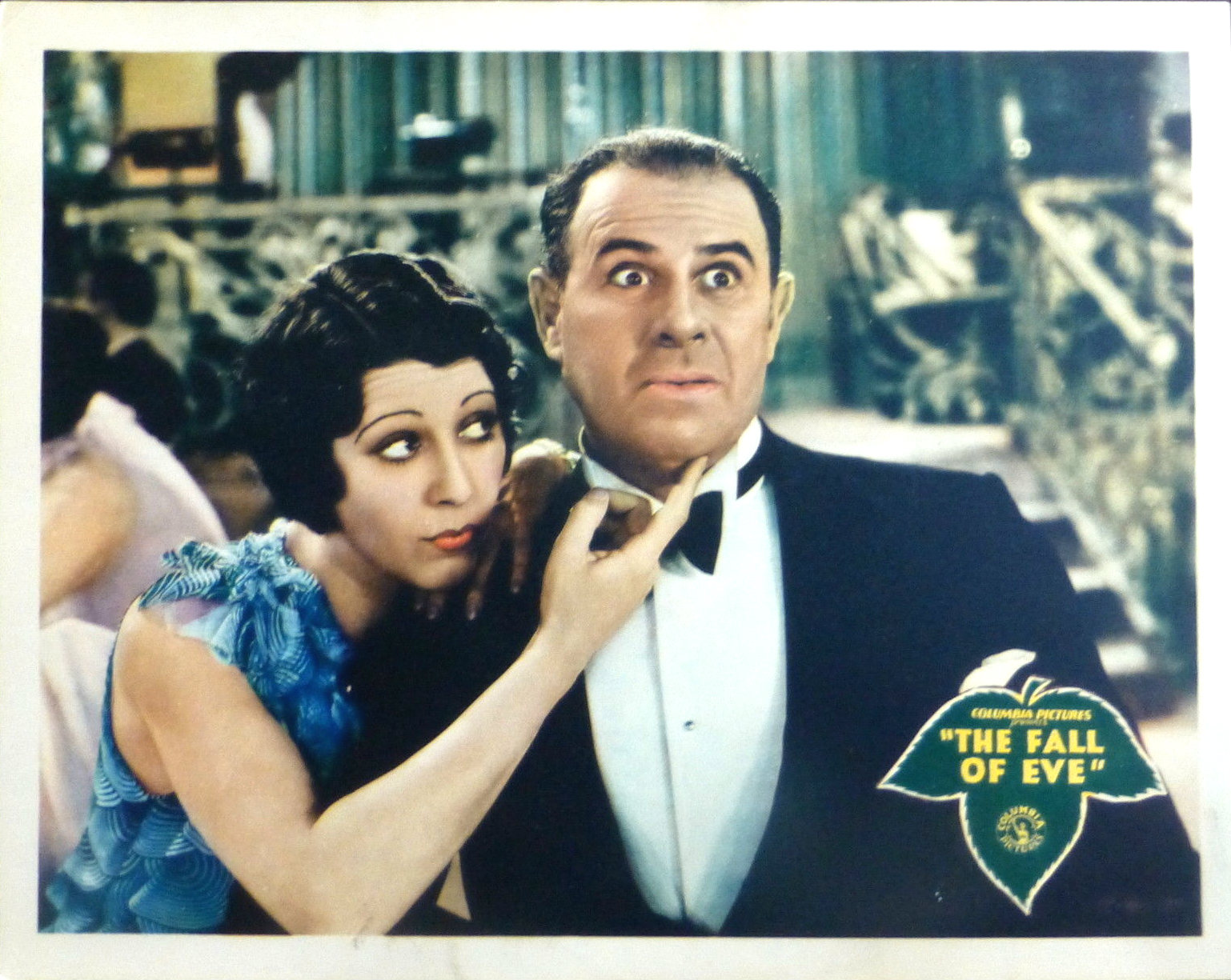
Sterling and Patsy Ruth Miller in The Fall of Eve (1929)

- At Coney Island (1912, Short) – The Married Flirt
- At It Again (1912, short)
- The Riot (1913, Short)
- Two Old Tars (1913, Short)
- Fatty at San Diego (1913, Short)
- Fatty's Flirtation (1913, Short)
- Murphy's I.O.U. (1913, Short) – (uncredited)
- His Chum the Baron (1913, Short) – Baron von Sneezer
- That Ragtime Band (1913, Short) – Professor Smelts
- The Foreman of the Jury (1913, Short) – Jones – Foreman of the Jury
- The Gangsters (1913, Short) – Desk Officer
- Barney Oldfield's Race for a Life (1913, Short) – The Villain
- The Waiters' Picnic (1913, Short) – Louis – the Chef
- Peeping Pete (1913, Short) – Neighbor's Husband
- A Bandit (1913, Short) – The Bandit
- For the Love of Mabel (1913, Short) – (uncredited)
- Safe in Jail (1913, Short) – The Constable
- The Rivals (1913, short) – The Village Shoemaker (also titled A STRONG REVENGE)
- Love and Courage (1913, Short) – (uncredited)
- Professor Bean's Removal (1913, Short) – Professor Bean
- A Game of Pool (1913, Short) – Schmidt
- Mabel's Dramatic Career (1913, Short) – Actor / Onscreen Villain
- The Fatal Taxicab (1913, Short) – Egbert Throckmorton
- When Dreams Come True (1913, Short) – The Peddler
- The Speed Kings (1913, Short) – Papa
- A Ride for a Bride (1913)
- Wine (1913, Short) – The Diner
- Cohen Saves the Flag (1913, Short) – Sgt. Cohen
- Some Nerve (1913, Short) – The Husband
- A Misplaced Foot (1914, Short)
- In the Clutches of the Gang (1914, Short) – Chief Tehiezel
- Tango Tangles (1914, Short) – Band Leader
- A Robust Romeo (1914, Short)
- A Thief Catcher (1914, Short) – Suspicious John
- Between Showers (1914, Short) – Rival Masher
- That Minstrel Man (1914)
- The Sea Nymphs (1914, Short)
- Hogan's Romance Upset (1915, Short) – Fight Spectator (uncredited)
- That Little Band of Gold (1915, Short) – Gassy Gotrox - Tattletale
- Court House Crooks (1915, Short) – The District Attorney
- Dirty Work in a Laundry (1915, Short) – The Desperate Scoundrel
- The Hunt (1915, Short) – Clarke's groom (in blackface)
- Fatty and the Broadway Stars (1915, Short) – Keystone Performer
- The Now Cure (1916)
- Yankee Doodle in Berlin (1919) – Kaiser Bill
- Salome vs. Shenandoah (1919, Short) – Ingenue Actress's Father
- Married Life (1920) – Heckler at Theatre
- Love, Honor and Behave (1920) – Milton Robbin – Haberdasher
- Oh, Mabel Behave (1922) – Squire Peachem
- The Strangers' Banquet (1922) – Al Norton
- The Brass Bottle (1923) – Rapkin
- The Spoilers (1923) – 'Slapjack' Simms
- Hollywood (1923) – Himself
- The Destroying Angel (1923) – Max Weil
- The Day of Faith (1923) – Montreal Sammy
- Wild Oranges (1924) – Paul Halvard
- The Galloping Fish (1924) – George Fitzgerald
- The Woman on the Jury (1924) – Juror
- Love and Glory (1924) – Emile Pompaneau
- He Who Gets Slapped (1924) – Tricaud
- So Big (1924) – Jacob Hoogenduck
- Daddy's Gone A-Hunting (1925) – Oscar
- My Lady's Lips (1925) – Smike
- The Three Way Trail (1925)
- The Trouble with Wives (1925) – Al Hennessey
- Steppin' Out (1925) – John Durant
- Stage Struck (1925) – Buck
- Mike (1926) – Tad
- The American Venus (1926) – Hugo Niles
- The Road to Glory (1926) – James Allen
- Miss Brewster's Millions (1926) – Ned Brewster
- Good and Naughty (1926) – Bunny West
- The Show-Off (1926) – Aubrey Piper
- Everybody's Acting (1926) – Michael Poole
- Stranded in Paris (1926) – Count Pasada
- The Trunk Mystery (1926) – Jeff
- Mantrap (1926)
- Casey at the Bat (1927) – O'Dowd
- Drums of the Desert (1927) – Perkins
- For the Love of Mike (1927) – Herman Schultz
- Figures Don't Lie (1927) – 'Howdy' Jones
- Wife Savers (1928) – Tavern Keeper
- Gentlemen Prefer Blondes (1928) – Gus Eisman
- Sporting Goods (1928) – Mr. Jordan
- Chicken a La King (1928) – Horace Trundle
- Oh, Kay! (1928) – Shorty McGee
- Dreary House (1928) – Paul
- The Fall of Eve (1929) – Mr. Mack
- The Girl in the Show (1929) – Ed Bondell
- Sally (1929) – 'Pops' Stendorff
- Spring Is Here (1930) – Peter Braley
- Showgirl in Hollywood (1930) – Sam Otis – The Producer
- Bride of the Regiment (1930) – Tangy – Silhouette Cutter
- Kismet (1930) – Amru
- Her Majesty, Love (1931) – Otmar
- Playthings of Desire (1933) – Bromwell Jones
- Alice in Wonderland (1933) – White King
- Behind the Green Lights (1935) – Max Schultz, German Janitor
- The Headline Woman (1935) – Hugo Meyer
- Black Sheep (1935) – Mather
- Keystone Hotel (1935, Short) – Sterling, Chief of Police
