= Fatty's Gift =

1914 film

- Directed by: Fatty Arbuckle
- Starring: Fatty Arbuckle
- Distributed by: Keystone Studios
- Release date: August 24, 1914
- Country: United States
- Languages: Silent; English intertitles

Fatty's Gift is a 1914 American short comedy film directed by and starring Fatty Arbuckle.

== Cast ==
- Roscoe "Fatty" Arbuckle
- Minta Durfee
- Hank Mann
- Al St. John

== See also ==
- List of American films of 1914
- Fatty Arbuckle filmography
