= Pool game =

Pool game may refer to:

- A game (in the sense of a defined set of rules) in the pool (pocket billiards) family of cue sports
- A game (in the sense of a frame or match between players or teams) of pool (pocket billiards)
- A game played in a swimming pool
- A video game that is a sports simulator of pool (pocket billiards)
  - Pool, a 1983 video game.

== See also ==
- A Game of Pool (disambiguation)
