= Safe in Jail =

1913 film

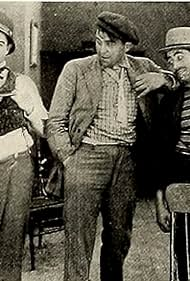
- Directed by: Mack Sennett
- Starring: Fatty Arbuckle
- Release date: March 7, 1913
- Country: United States
- Languages: Silent; English intertitles

Safe in Jail is a 1913 American short comedy film featuring Fatty Arbuckle. The plot is summarized as "two crooks burglarize the sheriff's home and live high for a while."

== Cast ==
- Roscoe "Fatty" Arbuckle
- Edgar Kennedy
- Hank Mann
- Charles Murray
- Ford Sterling

== See also ==
- List of American films of 1913
- Fatty Arbuckle filmography
