= Wine (1913 film) =

1913 film

- Directed by: George Nichols
- Starring: Fatty Arbuckle
- Release date: November 13, 1913
- Country: United States
- Languages: Silent; English intertitles

Wine is a 1913 short comedy film featuring Fatty Arbuckle.

== Cast ==
The cast included:

- Roscoe "Fatty" Arbuckle: Waiter
- Ford Sterling: Diner
- Minta Durfee: Sterling's Date
- Charles Inslee: Head Waiter
- Dot Farley: Woman

== See also ==
- List of American films of 1913
