= A Suspended Ordeal =

1914 film

- Directed by: Fatty Arbuckle
- Starring: Fatty Arbuckle
- Release date: May 9, 1914
- Country: United States
- Languages: Silent; English intertitles

A Suspended Ordeal is a 1914 short comedy film directed by and starring Fatty Arbuckle. The plot is summarized as "a mix-up between two policemen and their wives."

== Cast ==
- Roscoe "Fatty" Arbuckle
- Minta Durfee

== See also ==
- List of American films of 1914
- Fatty Arbuckle filmography
