= Fatty and the Broadway Stars =

1915 film

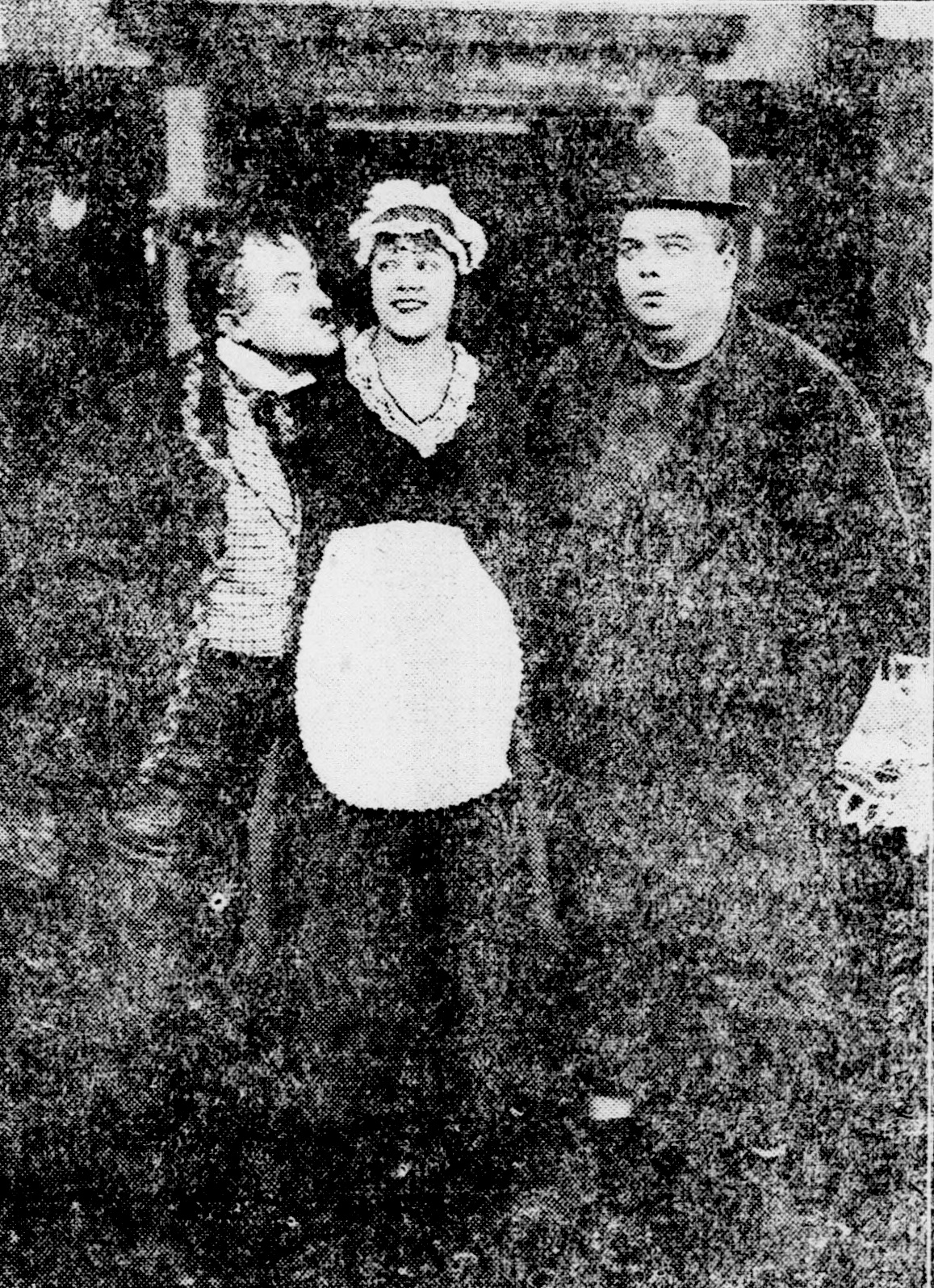
- Scene from the film.
- Directed by: Fatty Arbuckle
- Produced by: Mack Sennett
- Starring: Fatty Arbuckle
- Production company: Keystone Studios
- Distributed by: Triangle Film Corporation
- Release date: December 15, 1915
- Running time: 20 minutes
- Country: United States
- Languages: Silent; English intertitles

Surviving footage from a Norwegian print of Fatty and the Broadway Stars

Fatty and the Broadway Stars is a 1915 American short comedy film directed by and starring Fatty Arbuckle.

== Cast ==
- Roscoe "Fatty" Arbuckle
- Ivy Crosthwaite
- Mack Sennett
- Joe Weber
- Lew Fields
- Sam Bernard
- William Collier Sr.
- Joe Jackson
- Brett Clark
- Harry Booker
- Mae Busch - Actress
- Glen Cavender - Actor
- Chester Conklin
- Alice Davenport
- Minta Durfee - Actress
- Lewis Hippe - (as Lew Hippe)
- Tom Kennedy
- Fred Mace - Actor
- Hank Mann
- Polly Moran
- Charles Murray
- Al St. John
- Slim Summerville
- Mack Swain
- Wayland Trask
- Bobby Vernon - Actor
- Harry Gribbon
- Edgar Kennedy
- Keystone Cops - Police Force
- Ford Sterling

== See also ==
- List of American films of 1915
- Fatty Arbuckle filmography
