= Hank Mann =

American actor (1887–1971)

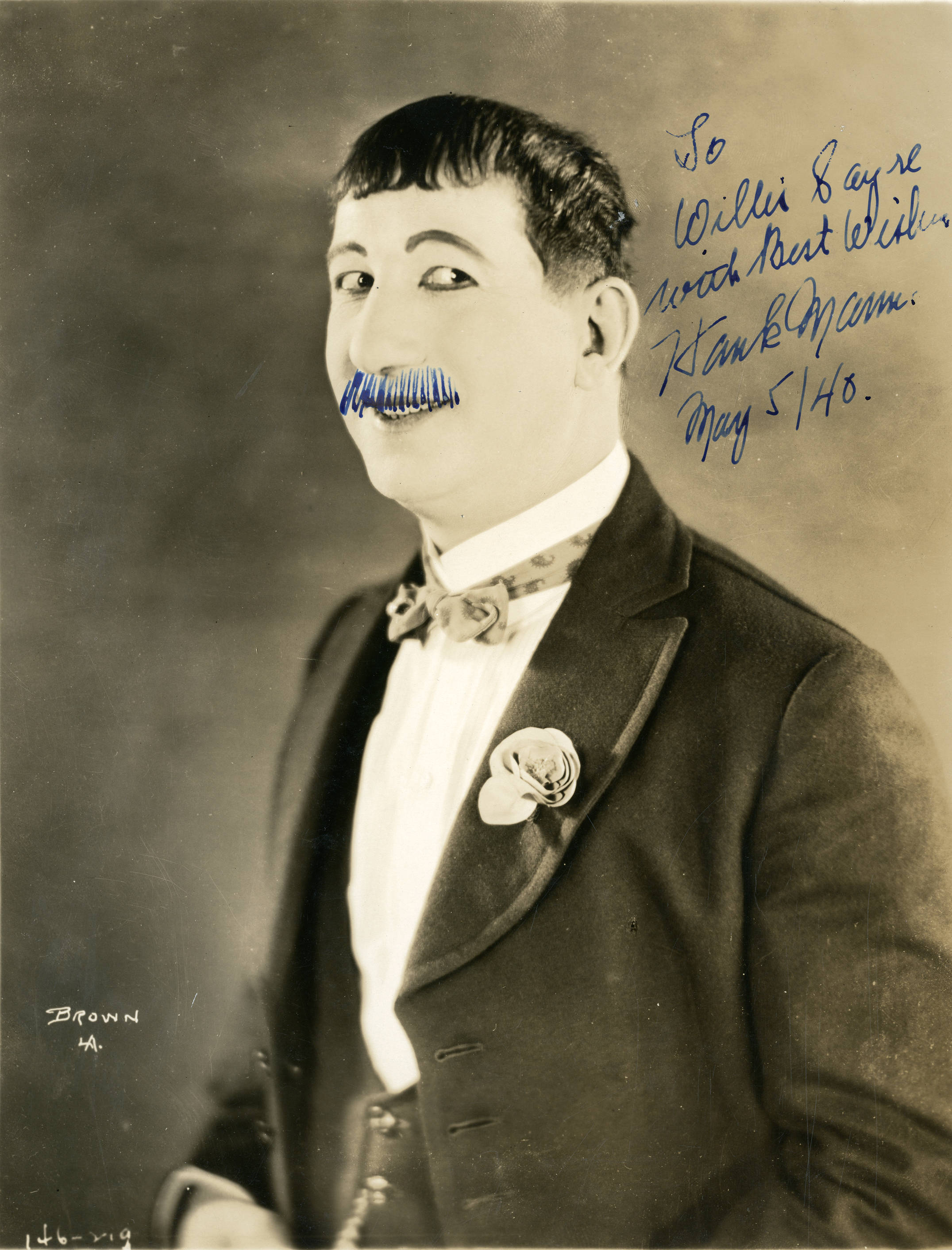
- Mann in 1925
- Born: David William Lieberman; May 28, 1887; Russia
- Died: November 25, 1971 (aged 84); South Pasadena, California, U.S.
- Resting place: Hollywood Forever Cemetery
- Occupations: Actor; comedian
- Years active: 1912–1960
- Spouses: Estelle Olmsted (m. 1920; div. 1921) Rachel (Rae) Max (m. 1924; died 1947) Dolly Myers Robinson (m. 1948)

Hank Mann (born David William Lieberman; May 28, 1887 – November 25, 1971) was a Russian-born American comedian and silent screen star who was a member of the Keystone Cops, and appeared as a supporting player in many of Charlie Chaplin's films.

== Career ==
Hank Mann was born in the Russian Empire, but emigrated to New York City with his parents and siblings in 1891.

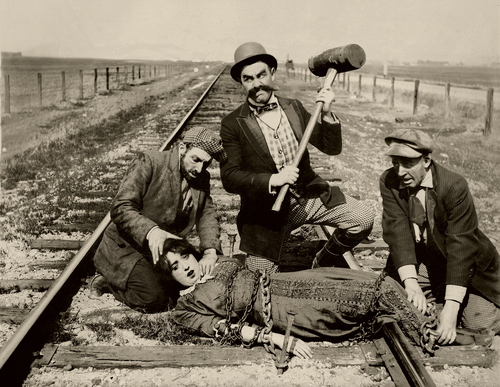
"Barney Oldfield's A Race for a Life" [1913] with left to right:Hank Mann; Ford Sterling; Al St John and in foreground Mabel Normand

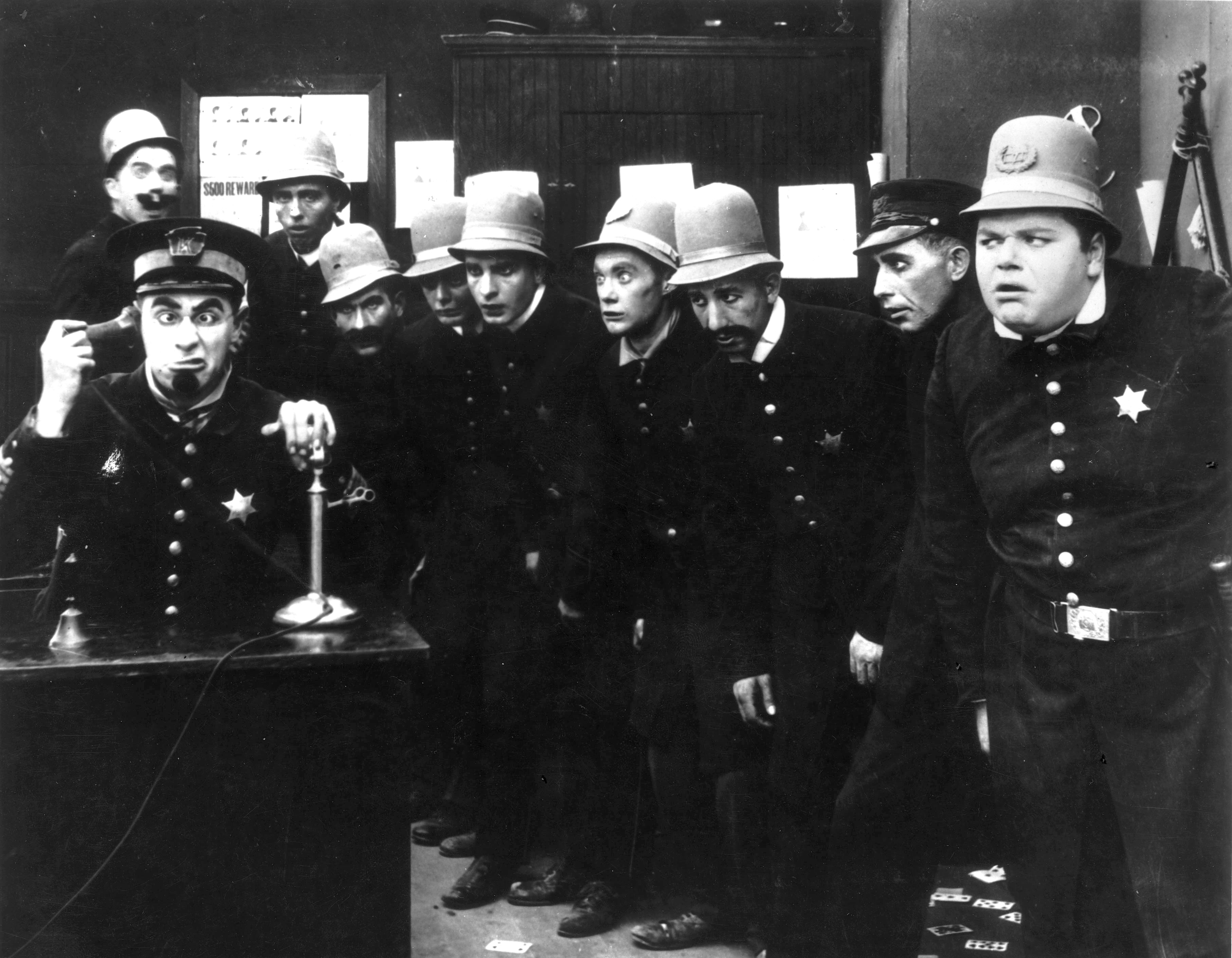
Left:Ford Sterling as Keystone Cops Police chief [seated}; 4th from right AL St John; 3rd from right: Hank Mann; in "In the Clutches of the Gang (1914)

Mann was one of the earliest of film comedians, working first for Mack Sennett as an original Keystone Cop, and later for producers William Fox and Morris R. Schlank in silent film comedies. With the advent of motion picture sound and the "talkies", he became a popular bit player and background extra in many quintessential motion picture dramas as well as comedies, including The Maltese Falcon (one of a group of reporters) and Mr. Smith Goes to Washington (as a photographer). One of his more sizable talkie roles was as a flustered hotel manager in the 1944 comedy-mystery Crime by Night, and he reunited with fellow Keystone player Chester Conklin as bartenders in the 1952 Bob Hope comedy Son of Paleface.

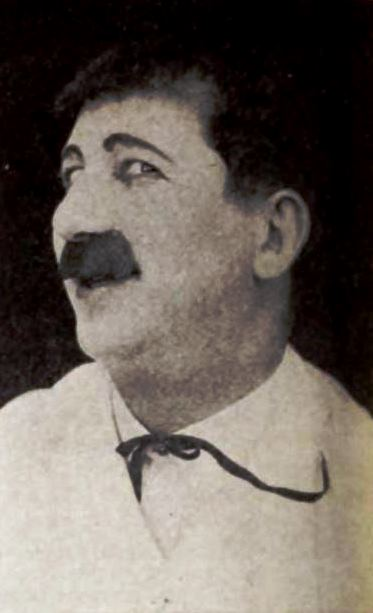
Hank Mann in 1920

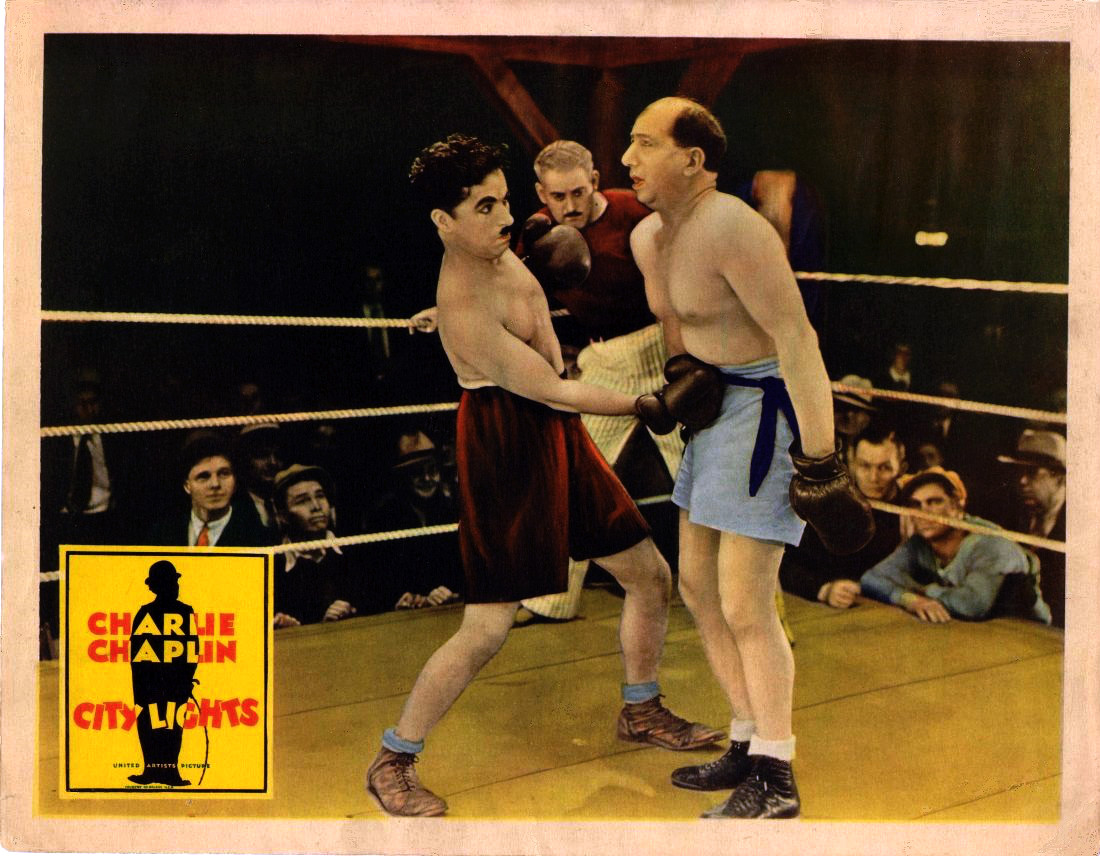
Mann (right) as Charlie Chaplin's boxing opponent in City Lights (1931)

One of Mann's most famous bits was as the "glass door man" in the Three Stooges' 1934 short Men in Black. Later in his career he continued to play bit parts in TV comedies, and made some appearances in several Jerry Lewis film comedies in the 1960s. Although he never really retired completely from the film industry, his later years were spent as an apartment building manager with his wife, Dolly, in the Los Feliz section of Los Angeles.

== Death ==
Mann died of heart failure on November 25, 1971, at the Braewood Convalescent Hospital in South Pasadena, California. He is interred in the Hall of David Mausoleum in the Hollywood Forever Cemetery in Hollywood, California.

== Awards ==
For his contribution to the motion picture industry, Hank Mann has a star on the Hollywood Walk of Fame at 6300 Hollywood Boulevard.

== Selected filmography ==
- Hoffmeyer's Legacy (1912, Short) - Keystone Kop (uncredited)
- Murphy's I.O.U. (1913, Short)
- The Gangsters (1913, Short) - Cop (uncredited)
- Safe in Jail (1913, Short) - Villager (uncredited)
- The Bangville Police (1913, Short)
- That Ragtime Band (1913, Short)
- The Foreman of the Jury (1913, Short)
- Barney Oldfield's Race for a Life (1913, Short)
- The Waiters' Picnic (1913, Short)
- The Riot (1913, Short)
- Fatty Joins the Force (1913, Short) - Cop at Station House (uncredited)
- Fatty's Flirtation (1913, Short) - Cop (uncredited)
- He Would a Hunting Go (1913, Short) - Sheriff
- In the Clutches of the Gang (1914, Short) - Cop (uncredited)
- A Misplaced Foot (1914, Short)
- Mabel's Strange Predicament (1914, Short)
- Twenty Minutes of Love (1914, Short) - Sleeper
- Caught in a Cabaret (1914, Short) - Dancer in Eyepatch (uncredited)
- The Alarm (1914, Short)
- The Knockout (1914, Short) - Tramp in Eyepatch / Cop (uncredited)
- Mabel's Married Life (1914, Short) - Tough in Bar
- Fatty's Finish (1914, Short)
- The Sky Pirate (1914, Short)
- The Face on the Bar Room Floor (1914, Short) - Drinker (uncredited)
- Fatty's Gift (1914, Short)
- Tillie's Punctured Romance (1914, Short) - Policeman / Waiter in Movie (uncredited)
- Fatty's New Role (1915, Short)
- That Little Band of Gold (1915, Short)
- Mabel and Fatty Viewing the World's Fair at San Francisco (1915, Short)
- Fatty's Plucky Pup (1915, Short)
- Vendetta in a Hospital (1915, Short) - Mr. Jowlfish
- Fatty and the Broadway Stars (1915, Short) - Keystone Performer
- A Dash of Courage (1916, Short) - Train Passenger (uncredited)
- Hearts and Sparks (1916, Short) - The Moneylender
- His Bread and Butter (1916, Short) - The jealous waiter
- Chased Into Love (1917, Short)
- The Janitor (1919) - The janitor
- Dr. Jekyll and Mr. Hyde (1920) satire
- Oh, Mabel Behave (1922) - Soldier (uncredited)
- Quincy Adams Sawyer (1922) - Ben Bates
- Hollywood (1923) - Himself
- Don't Marry for Money (1923) - An explorer
- Tea: With a Kick! (1923) - Sam Spindle
- Desire (1923) - E.Z. Pickens
- Lights Out (1923) - Ben
- The Wanters (1923) - Star boarder
- A Noise in Newboro (1923)
- Don't Marry for Money (1923) - An explorer
- The Near Lady (1923) - Lodger
- Riders Up (1924) - Boarder
- A Woman Who Sinned (1924) - Tattu
- The Fire Patrol (1924) - Fireman (uncredited)
- Empty Hands (1924) - Spring Water Man
- The Man Who Played Square (1924) - The Cook
- Rivers Up (1924)
- The Arizona Romeo (1925) - Deputy
- The Sporting Venus (1925) - Carlos' Valet
- The Fighting Heart (1925)
- The Skyrocket (1926) - Comedy Producer
- The Boob (1926) - The Village Soda Clerk
- The Flying Horseman (1926) - Newton Carey
- The Better 'Ole (1926) - German Soldier Tying Up Horse (uncredited)
- Wings of the Storm (1926) - Red Jones
- The Scorcher (1927)
- The Ladybird (1927) - The Brother
- Paid to Love (1927) - Servant
- The Patent Leather Kid (1927) - Sergeant
- Smile, Brother, Smile (1927) - The Collector
- When Danger Calls (1927) - Tommy Schultz
- Broadway After Midnight (1927)
- The Garden of Eden (1928) - Railroad Conductor (uncredited)
- Fazil (1928) - Ali - the Eunuch
- Morgan's Last Raid (1929) - Tex
- Spite Marriage (1929) - Stage Manager (uncredited)
- The Donovan Affair (1929) - Dr. Lindsey
- The Fall of Eve (1929) - Bob White
- Morgan's Raid (1929)
- The Arizona Kid (1930) - Bartender Bill
- Her Man (1930) - Ship's Passenger (uncredited)
- Sinners' Holiday (1930) - Happy
- The Dawn Trail (1930) - Cock-Eye
- City Lights (1931) - The prizefighter who boxes in the ring with Charlie Chaplin
- Three Girls Lost (1931) - Taxicab Driver (uncredited)
- Annabelle's Affairs (1931) - Summers
- X Marks the Spot (1931) - Solly Mintz (uncredited)
- Shop Angel (1932) - Mr. Weinberg
- Are You Listening? (1932) - Hank - Sound Effects Man (uncredited)
- Scarface (1932) - Stag Party Janitor (uncredited)
- The Strange Love of Molly Louvain (1932) - Harley - a Reporter (uncredited)
- Million Dollar Legs (1932) - Customs Inspector
- Those We Love (1932) - (uncredited)
- The Fourth Horseman (1932) - Tax Clerk (uncredited)
- Uptown New York (1932) - Man at Wrestling Match (uncredited)
- Me and My Gal (1932) - Hank (uncredited)
- Sailor's Luck (1933) - Ukelele Player (uncredited)
- The Big Chance (1933) - Tugboat
- From Headquarters (1933) - Al Cohen (uncredited)
- Smoky (1933) - Buck
- Caravan (1934) - Clothier (uncredited)
- Fugitive Road (1934) - Johann - Traunsee's Orderly
- The Girl from Missouri (1934) - Masseur on Yacht (uncredited)
- I'll Fix It (1934) - Window Washer (uncredited)
- Men in Black (1934) - Window glass installer
- The Nut Farm (1935) - Joe - Holland's Cameraman (uncredited)
- The Devil Is a Woman (1935) - Foreman on Snowbound Train (uncredited)
- The Big Broadcast of 1936 (1935) - Mustached Worker (uncredited)
- Barbary Coast (1935) - Waiter (uncredited)
- Chatterbox (1936) - Laughing Stage Hand (uncredited)
- Modern Times (1936) - Burglar with Big Bill
- The Preview Murder Mystery (1936) - Comedian
- Give Us This Night (1936) - Fisherman
- Call of the Prairie (1936) - Bartender Tom
- Reunion (1936) - Jake (uncredited)
- On the Avenue (1937) - Footman in Sketch (uncredited)
- Time Out for Romance (1937) - Rube (uncredited)
- Fair Warning (1937) - Hotel Employee (uncredited)
- Wake Up and Live (1937) - Eddie's Shill (uncredited)
- You Can't Have Everything (1937) - Cab Driver (uncredited)
- Wife, Doctor and Nurse (1937) - Taxi Driver (uncredited)
- Ali Baba Goes to Town (1937) - Man with Exploding Cigar (uncredited)
- Sally, Irene and Mary (1938) - Messenger (uncredited)
- Josette (1938) - Charlie - Stagehand (uncredited)
- Little Miss Broadway (1938) - Ventriloquist Hotel Tenant (uncredited)
- Hold That Co-ed (1938) - Alex - Soda Jerk (uncredited)
- The Stranger from Arizona (1938) - Sam Garrison
- Charlie Chan in Reno (1939) - Con Man (uncredited)
- It Could Happen to You (1939) - Sign Painter (uncredited)
- Mr. Moto Takes a Vacation (1939) - Minor Role (uncredited)
- Frontier Marshal (1939) - Drunk (uncredited)
- Charlie Chan at Treasure Island (1939) - Second Taxicab Driver (uncredited)
- Hollywood Cavalcade (1939) - Keystone Kop
- Mr. Smith Goes To Washington (1939) - Photographer (uncredited)
- The Great Victor Herbert (1939) - Automobile Driver (uncredited)
- Irene (1940) - Sam - Wrong-Way Driver (uncredited)
- The Great Dictator (1940) - Stormtrooper stealing fruit
- Li'l Abner (1940) - Bachelor, Sadies Hawkins Day Race
- Charter Pilot (1940) - Workman (uncredited)
- Meet John Doe (1941) - Eddie (uncredited)
- Melody for Three (1941) - Man at musicale (uncredited)
- The Cowboy and the Blonde (1941) - Studio Cafe Table Extra / Studio Workman (uncredited)
- Accent on Love (1941) - Workman (uncredited)
- Bullets for O'Hara (1941) - Swartzman
- Bad Men of Missouri (1941) - Man Robbed on Trail (uncredited)
- The Smiling Ghost (1941) - Collector (uncredited)
- Nine Lives Are Not Enough (1941) - City Room Worker (uncredited)
- One Foot in Heaven (1941) - Sam (uncredited)
- The Maltese Falcon (1941) - Reporter (uncredited)
- Blues in the Night (1941) - Prisoner Saying, 'Pipe Down' (uncredited)
- The Body Disappears (1941) - Janitor (uncredited)
- Honolulu Lu (1941) - Jack - Keystone Kop (uncredited)
- Steel Against the Sky (1941) - Worked Who Lived in Missouri (uncredited)
- The Man Who Came to Dinner (1942) - Expressman (uncredited)
- Don't Get Personal (1942) - Mr. Logarithim (uncredited)
- Wild Bill Hickok Rides (1942) - Salesman on Train (uncredited)
- Kings Row (1942) - Stable Keeper (uncredited)
- Bullet Scars (1942) - Gilly
- The Male Animal (1942) - Reporter (uncredited)
- Always in My Heart (1942) - 1st Truck Driver (uncredited)
- I Was Framed (1942) - Drunk (uncredited)
- Murder in the Big House (1942) - Reporter (uncredited)
- Larceny, Inc. (1942) - Ballplayer (uncredited)
- Yankee Doodle Dandy (1942) - Peck's Bad Boy Stagehand (uncredited)
- Spy Ship (1942) - News Office Worker (uncredited)
- Wings for the Eagle (1942) - Train Conductor (uncredited)
- Escape from Crime (1942) - Pete (uncredited)
- The Gay Sisters (1942) - Photographer (uncredited)
- You Can't Escape Forever (1942) - Newspaper Employee (uncredited)
- George Washington Slept Here (1942) - Moving Man (uncredited)
- The Hard Way (1943) - Backstage Janitor (uncredited)
- Two Weeks to Live (1943) - Building Janitor (uncredited)
- The Mysterious Doctor (1943) - Roger Porley (uncredited)
- The Phantom of the Opera (1943) - Stagehand (uncredited)
- Always a Bridesmaid (1943) - Man at Lonely Hearts Dance (uncredited)
- Thank Your Lucky Stars (1943) - Assistant Photographer in 'Ice Cold Katie' Number (uncredited)
- I Dood It (1943) - Minor Role (uncredited)
- Sweet Rosie O'Grady (1943) - Customer at Flugelman's (uncredited)
- Crazy House (1943) - Keystone Kop (uncredited)
- The Dancing Masters (1943) - Fruit Vendor (uncredited)
- Shine On, Harvest Moon (1944) - Audience Member (uncredited)
- Arsenic and Old Lace (1944) - Photographer at Marriage License Office (uncredited)
- Crime by Night (1944) - Mr. Dinwiddle - Desk Clerk (uncredited)
- The Last Ride (1944) - Mr. Mott, Night Watchman (uncredited)
- Love and Learn (1947) - Danceland Ticket Seller (uncredited)
- The Perils of Pauline (1947) - Comic Chef
- Roses Are Red (1947) - Pop Morris (uncredited)
- Always Together (1947) - Pedestrian Bystander (uncredited)
- Killer McCoy (1947) - Fight Spectator (uncredited)
- The Bride Goes Wild (1948) - Wedding Guest (uncredited)
- Big City (1948) - Drunk Barfly (uncredited)
- April Showers (1948) - San Francisco Theatre Technician (uncredited)
- Coroner Creek (1948) - Townsman (uncredited)
- When My Baby Smiles at Me (1948) - Man (uncredited)
- South of St. Louis (1949) - Barfly (uncredited)
- My Dream Is Yours (1949) - Hot Dog Vendor (uncredited)
- The Younger Brothers (1949) - Bank Teller (uncredited)
- The Beautiful Blonde from Bashful Bend (1949) - Hoodlum (uncredited)
- Look for the Silver Lining (1949) - Stage Hand (uncredited)
- Jiggs and Maggie in Jackpot Jitters (1949) - Saloon Customer (uncredited)
- Miss Grant Takes Richmond (1949) - One of Johnson's Workmen (uncredited)
- Roseanna McCoy (1949) - Vendor (uncredited)
- Fighting Man of the Plains (1949) - Saloon Waiter (uncredited)
- On the Town (1949) - Max the Photographer (uncredited)
- The Traveling Saleswoman (1950) - Man in Saloon (uncredited)
- Montana (1950) - Cowhand (uncredited)
- The Nevadan (1950) - Saloon Waiter / Barfly (uncredited)
- Ambush (1950) - Barber (uncredited)
- When Willie Comes Marching Home (1950) - American Legionnaire at Dance (uncredited)
- Cow Town (1950) - Townsman (uncredited)
- Fortunes of Captain Blood (1950) - Crew Member (uncredited)
- Timber Fury (1950) - Joe, the Bartender (uncredited)
- Joe Palooka in Humphrey Takes a Chance (1950) - Hiram
- 711 Ocean Drive (1950) - Counterman (uncredited)
- The Toast of New Orleans (1950) - Bar Patron (uncredited)
- Blues Busters (1950) - Man in Music Store (uncredited)
- Again Pioneers (1950) - Man at Meeting (uncredited)
- Dial 1119 (1950) - Newsboy (uncredited)
- The Misadventures of Buster Keaton (1950) - Hank (uncredited)
- Stage to Tucson (1950) - Townsman (uncredited)
- Two Lost Worlds (1951) - Sailor (uncredited)
- Al Jennings of Oklahoma (1951) - Railroad Switchman (uncredited)
- M (1951) - Man in Mob (uncredited)
- A Place in the Sun (1951) - Courtroom Spectator (uncredited)
- Skipalong Rosenbloom (1951) - Irate Townsman (uncredited)
- Home Town Story (1951) - Pedestrian Outside Newspaper Office (uncredited)
- As Young as You Feel (1951) - Man at Luncheon (uncredited)
- The Big Gusher (1951) - Barfly (uncredited)
- Strictly Dishonorable (1951) - Silent Movie Audience Member (uncredited)
- Passage West (1951) - Barfly (uncredited)
- On Moonlight Bay (1951) - Salesman in Silent Movie (uncredited)
- Best of the Badmen (1951) - Quinto Barfly (uncredited)
- The Lady and the Bandit (1951) - Man Outside Newgate Prison (uncredited)
- Angels in the Outfield (1951) - Baseball Fan (uncredited)
- Journey Into Light (1951) - Bum (uncredited)
- Come Fill the Cup (1951) - Newspaper Staffer (uncredited)
- Golden Girl (1951) - Quincy Townsman in Audience (uncredited)
- The Barefoot Mailman (1951) - Townsman at Dance (uncredited)
- The Stooge (1951) - Stagehand (uncredited)
- My Favourite Spy (1951) - Short Comic (uncredited)
- Flaming Feather (1952) - Townsman (uncredited)
- Rancho Notorious (1952) - Man on Porch (uncredited)
- Jack and the Beanstalk (1952) - Villager (uncredited)
- Son of Paleface (1952) - 1st Bartender (uncredited)
- The Silver Whip (1953) - Townsman (uncredited)
- Gunsmoke (1953) - Barfly (uncredited)
- Abbott and Costello Go to Mars (1953) - Clothing Store Clerk (uncredited)
- Raiders of the Seven Seas (1953) - Governor's Servant (uncredited)
- The Neanderthal Man (1953) - Naturalist at Conference (uncredited)
- Abbott and Costello Meet Dr. Jekyll and Mr. Hyde (1953) - London Bobby in Museum (uncredited)
- The Caddy (1953) - Stagehand (uncredited)
- A Lion Is in the Streets (1953) - Courtroom Spectator (uncredited)
- It Should Happen to You (1954) - Bar Patron (uncredited)
- Phantom of the Rue Morgue (1954) - Coachman (uncredited)
- Prince Valiant (1954) - (uncredited)
- River of No Return (1954) - Council City Townsman (uncredited)
- Silver Lode (1954) - Townsman (uncredited)
- Living It Up (1954) - Bus Boy (uncredited)
- The Black Dakotas (1954) - Townsman (uncredited)
- Three Hours to Kill (1954) - Townsman (uncredited)
- Brigadoon (1954) - Toy Booth Vendor (uncredited)
- Abbott and Costello Meet the Keystone Kops (1955) - Prop Man
- Hit the Deck (1955) - Stagehand (uncredited)
- Seven Angry Men (1955) - Homesteader (uncredited)
- A Man Called Peter (1955) - Man at Youth Rally (uncredited)
- Soldier of Fortune (1955) - Bar Extra (uncredited)
- The Sea Chase (1955) - Norwegian Radio Listener (uncredited)
- Abbott and Costello Meet the Mummy (1955) - Waiter with Flaming Kabob (uncredited)
- You're Never Too Young (1955) - Train Passenger (uncredited)
- How to Be Very, Very Popular (1955) - News Vendor (uncredited)
- Pete Kelly's Blues (1955) - Argumentative Husband in Speakeasy (uncredited)
- Good Morning, Miss Dove (1955) - Townsman at Bank (uncredited)
- The Naked Hills (1956) - Haver's Secretary (uncredited)
- Pardners (1956) - Townsman (uncredited)
- Friendly Persuasion (1956) - Carnival Patron (uncredited)
- Three Brave Men (1956) - Man at Co-Op Meeting (uncredited)
- Crime of Passion (1957) - Husband in Bed (uncredited)
- The Quiet Gun (1957) - Townsman (uncredited)
- Not of This Earth (1957) - Bum (uncredited)
- The Delicate Delinquent (1957) - Mr. Kellin, Milkman (uncredited)
- God Is My Partner (1957) - Juror (uncredited)
- Jeanne Eagels (1957) - Ticket Selling Barker (uncredited)
- Man of a Thousand Faces (1957 - Comedy Waiter
- Peyton Place (1957) - Courtroom Spectator (uncredited)
- Daddy-O (1958) - Barney
- The High Cost of Loving (1958) - Office Door Sign Painter (uncredited)
- Screaming Mimi (1958) - Waiter at El Madhouse (uncredited)
- Space Master X-7 (1958) - Plane Passenger (uncredited)
- Rock-A-Bye Baby (1958) - Street Sweeper (uncredited)
- Once Upon a Horse... (1958) - Barfly (uncredited)
- The Last Hurrah (1958) - (uncredited)
- Decision (1958, TV, episode "The Tall Man") - Storekeeper
- Alaska Passage (1959) - Townsman (uncredited)
- Some Like It Hot (1959) - Speakeasy Patron (uncredited)
- Compulsion (1959) - Courtroom Spectator (uncredited)
- Don't Give Up the Ship (1959) - Fight Manager (uncredited)
- Last Train from Gun Hill (1959) - Storekeeper (uncredited)
- Blue Denim (1959) - Train Passenger (uncredited)
- A Private's Affair (1959) - New York Mailman (uncredited)
- Inherit the Wind (1960) - Townsman (uncredited) (final film role)
