= Where Hazel Met the Villain =

1914 film

- Directed by: Fatty Arbuckle
- Starring: Fatty Arbuckle
- Release date: April 23, 1914
- Country: United States
- Languages: Silent; English intertitles

Where Hazel Met the Villain is a 1914 short comedy film directed by and starring Fatty Arbuckle, "a Keystone comedy of more than ordinary merit," according to a 1914 newspaper, which described the plot as "A wreck of fun with Hazel the heroine strapped to the track and on comes the roaring train." A British newspaper described it as "a modern melodrama, and a very funny one, too."

== Cast ==
- Roscoe "Fatty" Arbuckle
- Minta Durfee
- Mabel Normand

== See also ==
- List of American films of 1914
- Fatty Arbuckle filmography
