= Fatty's Debut =

1914 film

- Directed by: Fatty Arbuckle
- Starring: Fatty Arbuckle
- Production company: Keystone Studios
- Distributed by: Mutual Film
- Release date: September 26, 1914
- Country: United States
- Languages: Silent; English intertitles

Fatty's Debut is a 1914 American short comedy film directed by and starring Fatty Arbuckle. The film was produced by Keystone and distributed by Mutual Film.

== Plot ==
Fatty keeps his wife and mother-in-law waiting to go to the theater and when he does arrive, he is drunk. A forced plunge into a cold bath sobers him up a bit, and they head to the theater. But Fatty goes through the wrong door and breaks up the performance when he saves the stage heroine from the villain.

== Cast ==
- Roscoe "Fatty" Arbuckle
- Minta Durfee
- Al St. John

== Censorship ==
The Chicago Board of Censors cut out a scene of Fatty being "indecently attired" in a bathroom.

== See also ==
- List of American films of 1914
- Fatty Arbuckle filmography
