= Fatty and the Heiress =

1914 film

- Directed by: Fatty Arbuckle
- Written by: Craig Hutchinson
- Starring: Fatty Arbuckle
- Production company: Keystone Film Company
- Distributed by: Mutual Film
- Release date: June 25, 1914
- Country: United States
- Languages: Silent; English intertitles

Fatty and the Heiress is a 1914 American short comedy film directed by and starring Fatty Arbuckle.

== Cast ==
- Roscoe "Fatty" Arbuckle
- Edward Dillon (as Eddie Dillon)
- Minta Durfee
- Al St. John
- Slim Summerville

== See also ==
- List of American films of 1914
- Fatty Arbuckle filmography
