= Nell's Eugenic Wedding =

- Directed by: Edward Dillon
- Written by: Anita Loos
- Starring: Tod Browning; Fay Tincher
- Production company: Komic Pictures Company
- Distributed by: Mutual Film
- Release date: May 24, 1914
- Running time: 10–12 minutes; one reel
- Country: United States
- Language: Silent (English intertitles)

Nell's Eugenic Wedding is a lost 1914 silent comedy of one reel directed by Edward Dillon. It is a primitive example by Anita Loos of what is called in modern terms a gross-out film. Actor Tod Browning later achieved renown as a director. Most reviewers 'damned' the film as repugnant or tasteless.

== Plot ==
A man devours a bar of soap and later vomits everywhere he goes.

== Cast ==
- Fay Tincher – Nell
- Tod Browning
- Joseph Belmont – Policeman (*billed as Baldy Belmont)
- Edward Dillon
- Max Davidson
