= Twenty Minutes of Love =

1914 film by Charlie Chaplin

- Directed by: Joseph Maddern; Charlie Chaplin
- Produced by: Mack Sennett
- Starring: Charlie Chaplin; Minta Durfee; Edgar Kennedy; Gordon Griffith; Chester Conklin; Josef Swickard; Hank Mann
- Cinematography: Frank D. Williams
- Distributed by: Keystone Studios
- Release date: April 20, 1914
- Running time: 10 minutes
- Country: United States
- Language: Silent (English intertitles)

Twenty Minutes of Love is a 1914 American silent short comedy film made by Keystone Studios. The film is widely reported as Charlie Chaplin's directorial debut; some sources name Joseph Maddern as the director, but generally credit Chaplin as the creative force.

== Synopsis ==
The action takes place in a busy park, with Chaplin's character initially harassing a courting couple, before he finds a lone girl who has wandered off from her suitor. The suitor steals a watch from a sleeping man and Chaplin then steals it from him and gives it to the girl (who immediately transfers her affections to him). A fight ensues, which escalates into a much larger fight, resulting in everyone falling into a pond, leaving Chaplin to head off with the girl.

== Reviews ==
The reviewer for Bioscope wrote, "Here Chaplin plays the role of the undesired but persistent suitor. The comic element is given special prominence and is quite safe in the hands of this well known comedian."

A reviewer from Kinematograph Weekly wrote, "Plenty of the comic element is introduced and the person who does not laugh at the peculiar antics of Chas. Chaplin--well, must be hard to please."

== Cast ==
- Charlie Chaplin – Pickpocket
- Minta Durfee – Woman
- Edgar Kennedy – Lover
- Gordon Griffith – Boy
- Chester Conklin – Pickpocket
- Josef Swickard – Victim
- Hank Mann – Sleeper
- Eva Nelson

== See also ==
- Charlie Chaplin filmography
