= Dirty Work in a Laundry =

1915 film

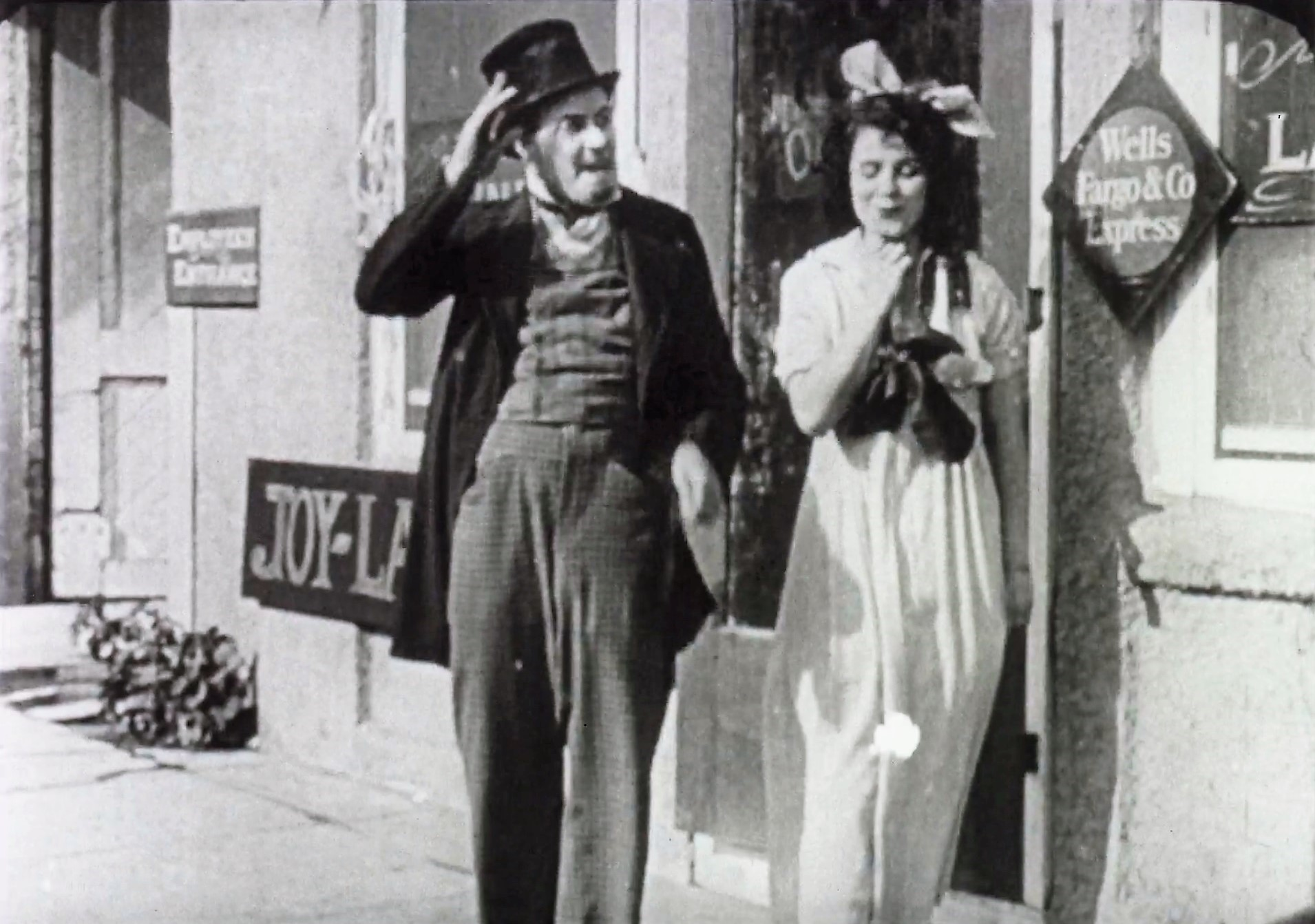
- The villain (Sterling) first meets the heroine (Durfee) outside the titular laundry
- Directed by: Ford Sterling
- Produced by: Mack Sennett
- Starring: Ford Sterling, Minta Durfee
- Production company: Keystone Studios
- Release date: July 19, 1915
- Running time: 18 minutes
- Country: United States
- Languages: Silent; English intertitles

Dirty Work in a Laundry is a 1915 American silent comedy short film featuring Ford Sterling and Minta Durfee. It was re-released in 1918 as The Desperate Scoundrel.

== Cast ==
- Ford Sterling
- Minta Durfee
- Harry Bernard

== Preservation ==
The film survives, and was released on 8mm and 16mm several times by Blackhawk Films.16mm prints are held by both George Eastman Museum and Pacific Film Archive.

== See also ==
- List of American films of 1915
