= The Sky Pirate (film) =

1914 film

- Directed by: Fatty Arbuckle; Edward Dillon
- Starring: Fatty Arbuckle
- Release date: July 18, 1914
- Country: United States
- Languages: Silent; English intertitles

The Sky Pirate is a 1914 American short comedy film directed by and starring Fatty Arbuckle.

== Cast ==
- Roscoe "Fatty" Arbuckle
- Minta Durfee
- Hank Mann
- Mabel Normand
- Al St. John

== See also ==
- List of American films of 1914
