= Court House Crooks =

1915 film

- Directed by: Ford Sterling
- Produced by: Mack Sennett
- Starring: Ford Sterling
- Distributed by: Keystone Studios
- Release date: July 5, 1915
- Running time: 22 minutes
- Country: United States
- Languages: Silent; English intertitles

Court House Crooks is a 1915 American short comedy film. It features Harold Lloyd in an uncredited role.

== Cast ==
- Ford Sterling as The District Attorney
- Charles Arling as Judge Grey
- Minta Durfee as The Judge's Wife
- Doris Baker as Little Sister (uncredited)
- Billie Bennett as Mother (uncredited)
- Harold J. Binney as Large Juror (uncredited)
- Louise Carver as Older Woman (uncredited)
- Patrick Kelly as Man Next to Large Man (uncredited)
- Jack Mintz as Juror
- Harold Lloyd as Young Man Out of Work (uncredited)
- Eddie Nolan as Lead Policeman
- Dan Albert as Soda Jerk

== Preservation status ==
The film is preserved in the Library of Congress collection.

== See also ==
- List of American films of 1915
- Harold Lloyd filmography
