= The Waiters' Picnic =

1913 American short comedy film

- Directed by: Mack Sennett
- Produced by: Mack Sennett
- Starring: Fatty Arbuckle; Mabel Normand; Ford Sterling
- Release date: June 16, 1913
- Country: United States
- Languages: Silent; English intertitles

The Waiters' Picnic is a 1913 American short comedy film featuring Fatty Arbuckle, Mabel Normand, and Ford Sterling. The plot involves two men, a chef and a head waiter, who are vying for attentions of a woman at a picnic. The chef tries to poison the waiter to win the rivalry, but he must prevent the woman and her family from consuming the same poisoned dish.

== Cast ==
- Roscoe "Fatty" Arbuckle
- Mabel Normand
- Ford Sterling
- Nick Cogley
- Bert Hunn
- Al St. John
- Hank Mann
- William Nigh

== See also ==
- List of American films of 1913
- Fatty Arbuckle filmography
