= In the Clutches of the Gang =

1914 film

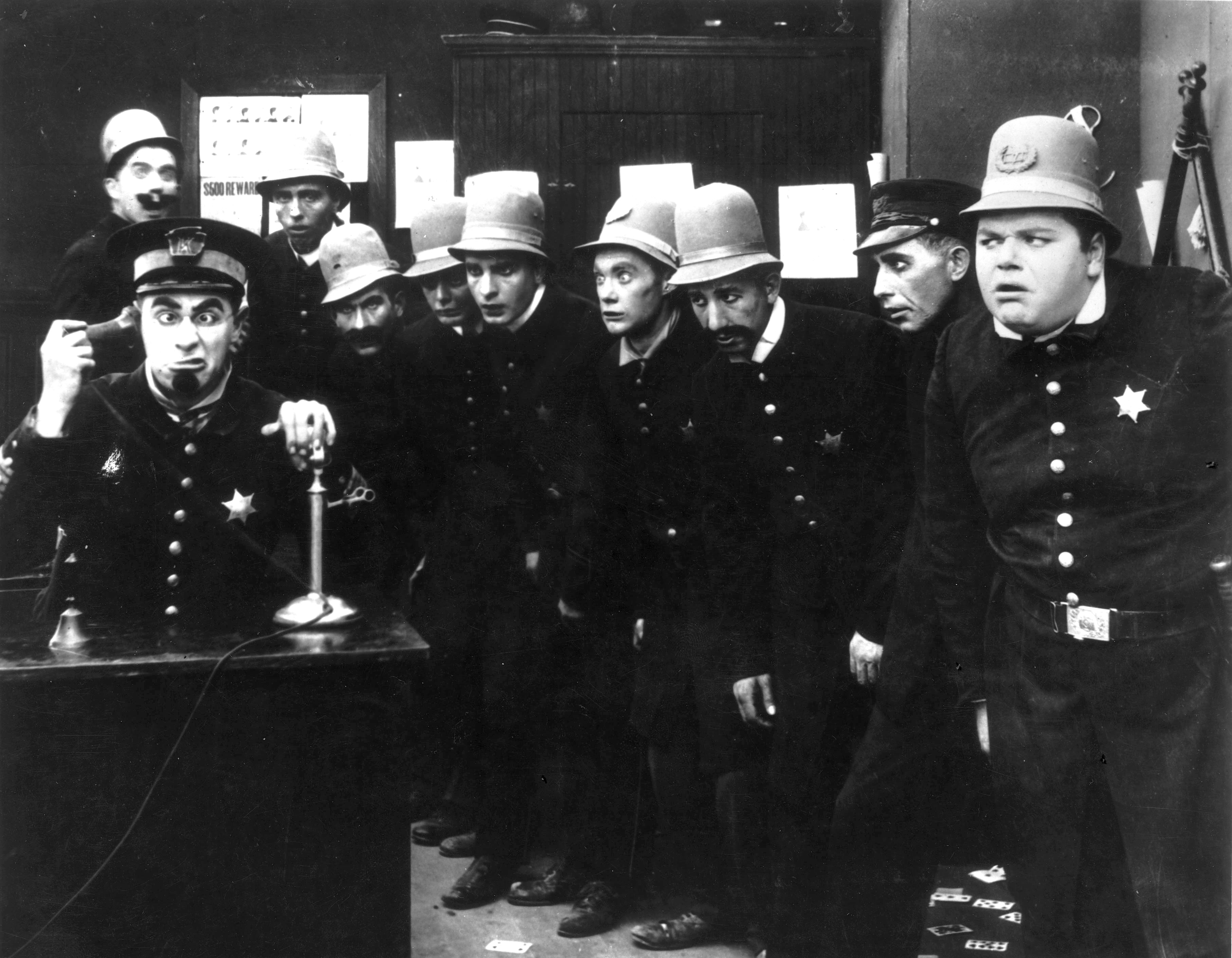
- Directed by: George Nichols; Mack Sennett
- Produced by: Mack Sennett
- Starring: Roscoe Arbuckle
- Release date: January 17, 1914
- Country: United States
- Languages: Silent; English intertitles

In the Clutches of the Gang (also known as In the Clutches of a Gang) is a 1914 American short comedy film featuring Roscoe Arbuckle and the Keystone Cops. The majority of the film is believed to be lost. However, a fragment of the film exists and is held by the Academy of Motion Picture Arts and Sciences. This film is considered to be a "high point" for the Keystone Cops, as the entire movie focuses on the slapstick police force.

== Cast ==
- Roscoe "Fatty" Arbuckle as Keystone Cop
- Robert Cox as Keystone Cop
- Bobby Dunn as Keystone Cop
- George Jeske as Keystone Cop
- Edgar Kennedy as Keystone Cop
- Virginia Kirtley as The Girl
- Hank Mann as Keystone Cop
- Rube Miller as Keystone Cop
- George Nichols as The Detective
- Ford Sterling as Chief Tehiezel
- Al St. John as Keystone Cop
- Charles Avery

== See also ==
- List of American films of 1914
- Fatty Arbuckle filmography
