= Oh, Mabel Behave =

1922 film

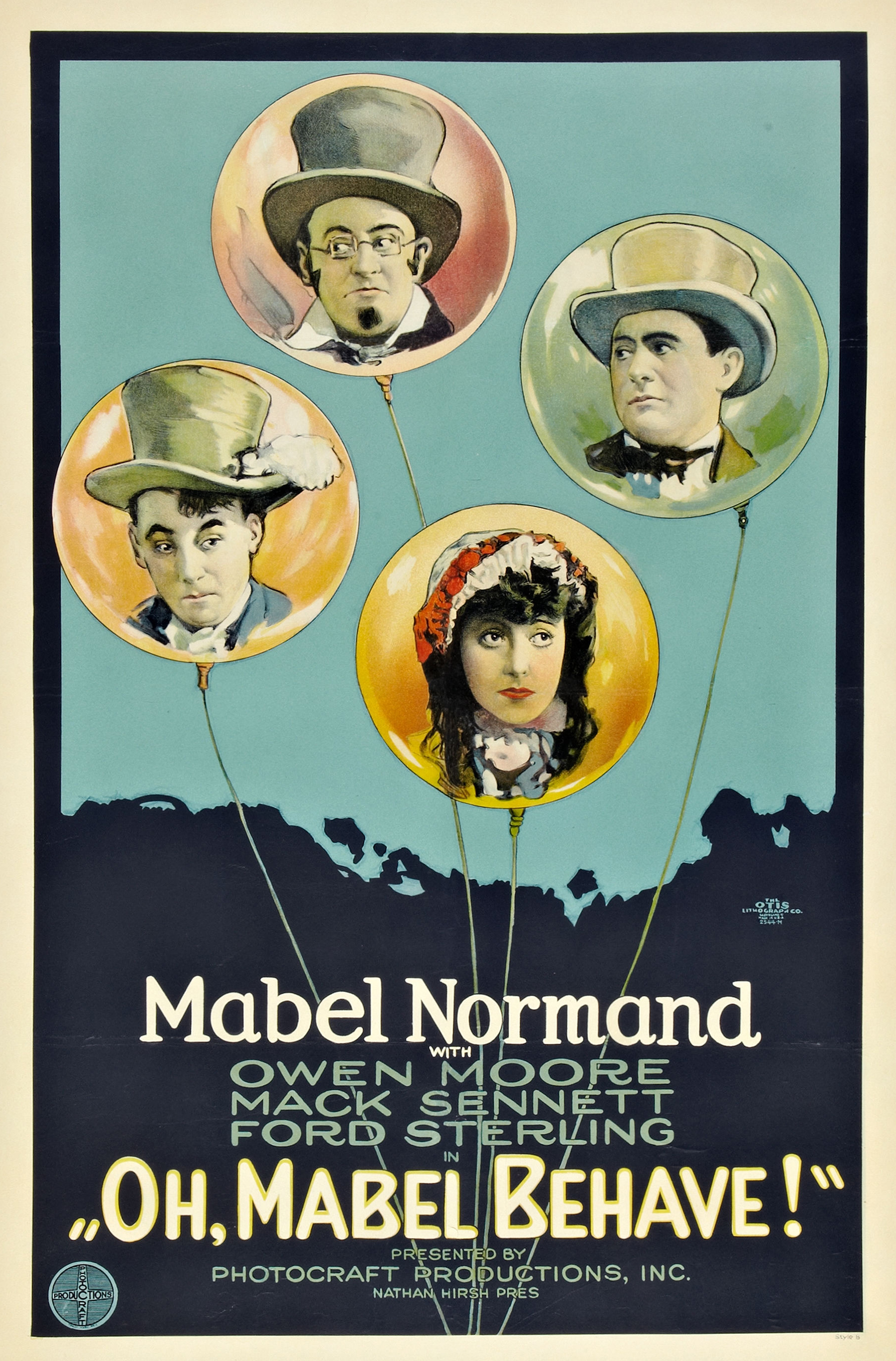
- Theatrical release poster
- Directed by: Mack Sennett; Ford Sterling (uncredited)
- Written by: Joseph Farnham (titles)
- Produced by: Triangle Film Corporation
- Starring: Mabel Normand
- Distributed by: Photocraft Productions
- Release date: June 20, 1922 (United States)
- Running time: 5 reels
- Country: United States
- Language: Silent (English intertitles)

Oh, Mabel Behave is a 1922 American silent comedy film starring Mabel Normand, Owen Moore, Mack Sennett, and Ford Sterling. Sennett and Sterling also directed the film. A print of the film survives.

This film was likely filmed in 1915 or 1916 as it is listed as produced by Triangle Film Corporation, which was defunct by 1922.

== Cast ==
- Mabel Normand as Innkeeper's Daughter
- Owen Moore as Randolph Roanoke
- Mack Sennett as Blaa Blaa
- Ford Sterling as Squire Peachem
- Alice Davenport as The Innkeeper's Wife
- Fontaine La Rue as The Barmaid (credited as Dora Rodgers)
- Dave Anderson as Townsman (uncredited)
- Edward F. Cline as Soldier (uncredited)
- Bobby Dunn as Inn Patron (uncredited)
- Billy Gilbert as Inn Patron
- Hank Mann as Soldier (uncredited)
- George Ovey as Young Sweetheart in Park (uncredited)
- Josef Swickard as Townsman (uncredited)
