= The Water Dog =

1914 film

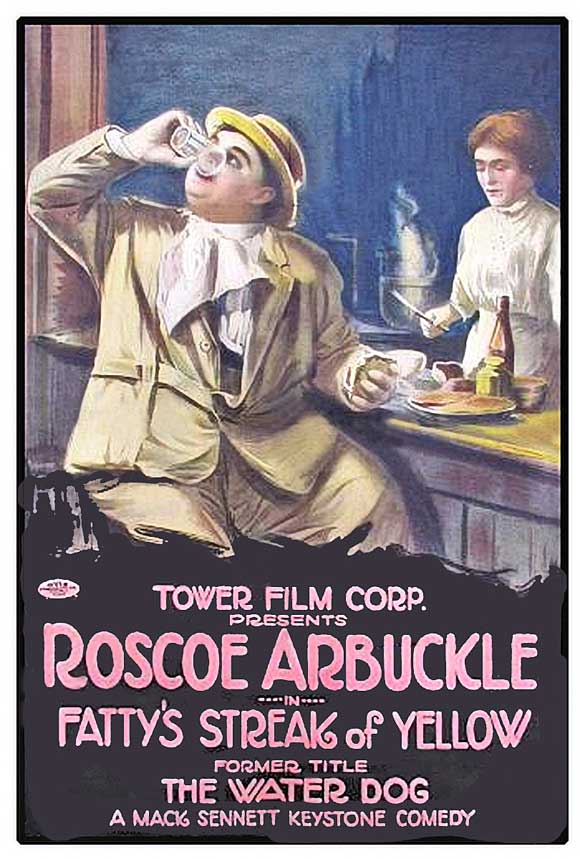
- Theatrical poster to The Water Dog
- Directed by: Fatty Arbuckle
- Starring: Fatty Arbuckle
- Release date: May 13, 1914
- Country: United States
- Languages: Silent; English intertitles

The Water Dog is a 1914 American short comedy film directed by and starring Fatty Arbuckle. The film primarily follows the attempts to rescue a young girl who has been stranded on a rock in the ocean as the tide comes in, necessitating the involvement of local police and bystanders. The conflict is resolved when the girl is rescued by her pet dog, hence the title of the film.

== Cast ==
- Roscoe "Fatty" Arbuckle: Fatty
- Baby Doris Baker: Little Girl
- Minta Durfee: Nursemaid
- Alice Davenport: Woman Kissed By Fatty
- Bill Hauber: Nursemaid's Boyfriend
- Charles Avery: Man Who Sees Girl on Rocks
- Harry Russell: Balding Bearded Cop

== See also ==
- List of American films of 1914
- Fatty Arbuckle filmography
