= The Reckoning (1908 film) =

1908 film directed by D. W. Griffith

- Directed by: D. W. Griffith
- Written by: D. W. Griffith; Frank E. Woods
- Starring: Harry Solter
- Cinematography: G. W. Bitzer
- Release date: December 11, 1908
- Running time: 8 minutes (one reel)
- Country: United States
- Language: Silent

The Reckoning is a 1908 American silent short drama film directed by D. W. Griffith. It is an adaptation of Robert W. Chambers's 1905 novel.

== Cast ==
- Harry Solter as The Husband
- Florence Lawrence as The Wife
- Mack Sennett as The Lover
- Edward Dillon
- George Gebhardt as The Bartender
- Robert Harron as Man in Crowd
- Arthur V. Johnson as Policeman
