= Minta Durfee =

American actress (1889–1975)

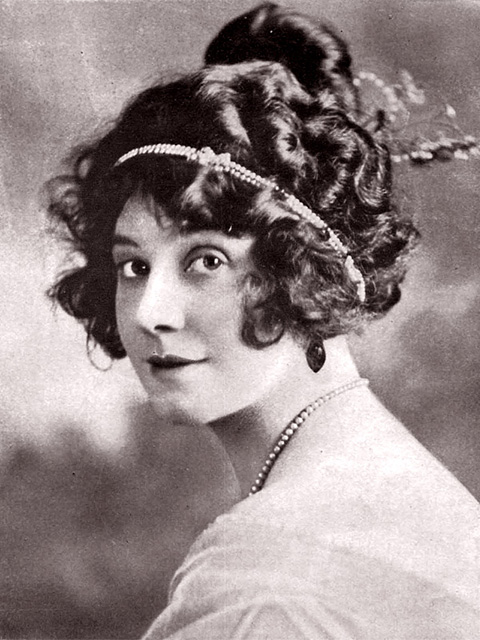
- Durfee in 1915
- Born: Araminta Estelle Durfee; October 1, 1889; Los Angeles, California, U.S.
- Died: September 9, 1975 (aged 85); Los Angeles California, U.S.
- Other name: Minta Durfee Arbuckle
- Occupation: Actress
- Years active: 1913–1971
- Spouse: Roscoe Arbuckle (m. 1908; div. 1925)

Araminta Estelle "Minta" Durfee (October 1, 1889 – September 9, 1975) was an American silent film actress from Los Angeles, California, possibly best known for her supporting role in Mickey (1918).

== Marriage to Arbuckle ==
She met Roscoe Arbuckle when he was attempting to get started in theater, and the two married on August 8, 1908, in Los Angeles. Durfee entered show business in local companies as a chorus girl at the age of 17. She was the first leading lady of Charlie Chaplin.

Durfee and Arbuckle separated in 1921, just prior to a scandal involving the death of starlet Virginia Rappe. There were three trials and, finally, Arbuckle was acquitted, but his career was destroyed and he received few job offers. Durfee and Arbuckle divorced in 1925. Durfee in her later years said Arbuckle was "the most generous human being I've ever met", and "if I had to do it all over again, I'd still marry the same man." Durfee was an avid defender of her close friend Mabel Normand throughout Normand's many public scandals.

== Career ==
Early in her career, Durfee sang in shows in Los Angeles. After she and Arbuckle separated she operated a cosmetics business on Hollywood Boulevard.

A regular performer on television, Durfee appeared on such shows as Noah's Ark (1956). She had minor roles in motion pictures including How Green Was My Valley (1941), Naughty Marietta (1935), Rose-Marie (1936), It's A Mad, Mad, Mad, Mad World (1963), The Unsinkable Molly Brown (1964), and Savage Intruder (1970).

== Later years and death ==
In later life, Durfee gave lectures on silent film and held retrospectives on her and her former husband's pictures. She was surprised and excited by the renewed interest in silent film.

Durfee died in Woodland Hills, California, at the Motion Picture Country Home in 1975. She suffered from a heart ailment.

== Filmography ==
- His Sister's Kids (1913, Short) (uncredited)
- Fatty's Day Off (1913, Short)
- A Quiet Little Wedding (1913, Short) as Fatty's fiancée
- Fatty at San Diego (1913, Short) as Girl at the carnival
- Wine (1913, Short) as Diner's sweetheart
- Fatty Joins the Force (1913, Short) (uncredited)
- Fatty's Flirtation (1913, Short) as Minta
- Ambrose's First Falsehood (1914, Short) (uncredited)
- A Misplaced Foot (1914, Short)
- The Under-Sheriff (1914, Short) as The Sheriff's Wife
- A Flirt's Mistake (1914, Short) (uncredited)
- Rebecca's Wedding Day (1914, Short) as Wedding guest (uncredited)
- Making a Living (1914, Short) as Girl (uncredited)
- Tango Tangles (1914, Short) as Guest
- Cruel, Cruel Love (1914, Short) as The Lady
- The Star Boarder (1914, Short) as Landlady
- Twenty Minutes of Love (1914, Short) as Edgar's girl
- Where Hazel Met the Villain (1914, Short)
- Caught in a Cabaret (1914, Short) as Cabaret patron / Girl in park (uncredited)
- A Suspended Ordeal (1914, Short)
- The Water Dog (1914, Short) as Nursemaid
- The Alarm (1914, Short)
- The Knockout (1914, Short) as Pug's sweetheart (uncredited)
- Fatty and the Heiress (1914, Short)
- Fatty's Finish (1914, Short)
- The Sky Pirate (1914, Short)
- Those Happy Days (1914, Short)
- Fatty's Gift (1914, Short) as Fatty's Wife
- The Masquerader (1914, Short) as leading lady
- His New Profession (1914, Short)
- The Rounders (1914, Short) as Fatty's wife
- Lover's Luck (1914, Short) as The Girl
- Fatty's Debut (1914, Short)
- Fatty Again (1914, Short) as Proprietor's daughter
- Lovers' Post Office (1914, Short) as Fatty's sweetheart
- An Incompetent Hero (1914, Short) as Neighbor's maid
- Tillie's Punctured Romance (1914) as Maid (uncredited)
- Fatty's Wine Party (1914, Short) as in a minor role (uncredited)
- Leading Lizzie Astray (1914, Short) as Lizzie, the farm boy's fiancée
- Fatty's Magic Pants (1914, Short) as Fatty's sweetheart
- Fatty and Minnie He-Haw (1914, Short) as Minta
- Dirty Work in a Laundry (1915, Short) (uncredited)
- A Bird's a Bird (1915, Short) (uncredited)
- Fatty and Mabel at the San Diego Exposition (1915, Short) as Jealous husband's wife (uncredited)
- Mabel, Fatty and the Law (1915, Short) as Flirty wife
- Fatty's Reckless Fling (1915, Short) as Neighbor's wife
- Fatty's Faithful Fido (1915, Short) (uncredited)
- Fatty's Chance Acquaintance (1915, Short) as Pickpocket's girlfriend
- That Little Band of Gold (1915, short)
- Fatty's Faithful Fido (1915, Short) as Fatty's sweetheart
- When Love Took Wings (1915, Short)
- Court House Crooks (1915, Short) as Judge's wife
- Dirty Work in a Laundry (1915)
- Fickle Fatty's Fall (1915, Short) as Fatty's wife
- Fatty and the Broadway Stars (1915, Short) as Sam Bernard's leading lady
- Fatty and Mabel at the San Diego Exposition (1915, Short) (uncredited)
- Bright Lights (1916, Short) in a minor role (uncredited)
- His Wife's Mistakes (1916, Short)
- The Other Man (1916, Short)
- The Cabaret (1918)
- Mickey (1918) as Elsie Drake
- Skinner's Dress Suit (1926) as Party guest (uncredited)
- Naughty Marietta (1935) in minor role (uncredited)
- The Man with Nine Lives (1940) (uncredited)
- Glamour for Sale (1940) as Matron (uncredited)
- Rollin' Home to Texas (1940) (uncredited)
- The Devil and Miss Jones (1941) as Customer (uncredited)
- How Green Was My Valley (1941) in a minor role (uncredited)
- The Miracle Kid (1941) as Pheney
- The Man Who Returned to Life (1942) as Mrs. Tuller (uncredited)
- Blondie for Victory (1942) as Housewife (uncredited)
- The Chance of a Lifetime (1943) (uncredited)
- Eve Knew Her Apples (1945) as Landlady (uncredited)
- The Son of Rusty (1947) as Townswoman (uncredited)
- My Dog Rusty (1948) as Mrs. Laura Foley (uncredited)
- How to Be Very, Very Popular (1955) as Older woman (uncredited)
- Artists and Models (1955) as Dancer (uncredited)
- Around the World in 80 Days (1956) as an extra (uncredited)
- Hollywood or Bust (1956) as Miss Pettywood (uncredited)
- The Buster Keaton Story (1957) as Boarder (uncredited)
- An Affair to Remember (1957) as Ship passenger (uncredited)
- Will Success Spoil Rock Hunter? (1957) as Scrubwoman (uncredited)
- The Big Fisherman (1959) in a minor role (uncredited)
- Beloved Infidel (1959) (uncredited)
- My Six Loves (1963) as Woman at auction (uncredited)
- It's a Mad, Mad, Mad, Mad World (1963) as Woman in crowd (uncredited)
- The Unsinkable Molly Brown (1964) as Denver party guest (uncredited)
- Caprice (1967) as Agent (uncredited)
- Savage Intruder (1970) as Guest
- Willard (1971) (uncredited)
- What's the Matter with Helen? (1971) as Old lady (uncredited)
- The Steagle (1971) as Old lady (uncredited)
- Portnoy's Complaint (1972) as Elevator lady
