= The Foreman of the Jury =

1913 film

- Directed by: Mack Sennett
- Starring: Mabel Normand
- Release date: May 22, 1913
- Country: United States
- Languages: Silent; English intertitles

The Foreman of the Jury is a 1913 American short comedy film featuring Mabel Normand.

== Cast ==
- Roscoe "Fatty" Arbuckle
- Fred Mace
- Hank Mann
- Mabel Normand
- Ford Sterling

== See also ==
- List of American films of 1913
- Fatty Arbuckle filmography
- Jury foreman
