= The Alarm (film) =

1914 film

- Directed by: Fatty Arbuckle; Edward Dillon
- Written by: Fatty Arbuckle
- Starring: Fatty Arbuckle
- Release date: May 28, 1914
- Country: United States
- Languages: Silent; English intertitles

The Alarm is a 1914 American short comedy film directed by and starring Fatty Arbuckle. This silent film was produced by Mack Sennett and The Keystone Film Company and distributed by Mutual Film Corporation. It was released on May 28, 1914.

== Cast ==
- Roscoe "Fatty" Arbuckle
- Minta Durfee
- Hank Mann
- Mabel Normand
- Al St. John

== See also ==
- List of American films of 1914
