= That Little Band of Gold =

1915 film by Roscoe Arbuckle

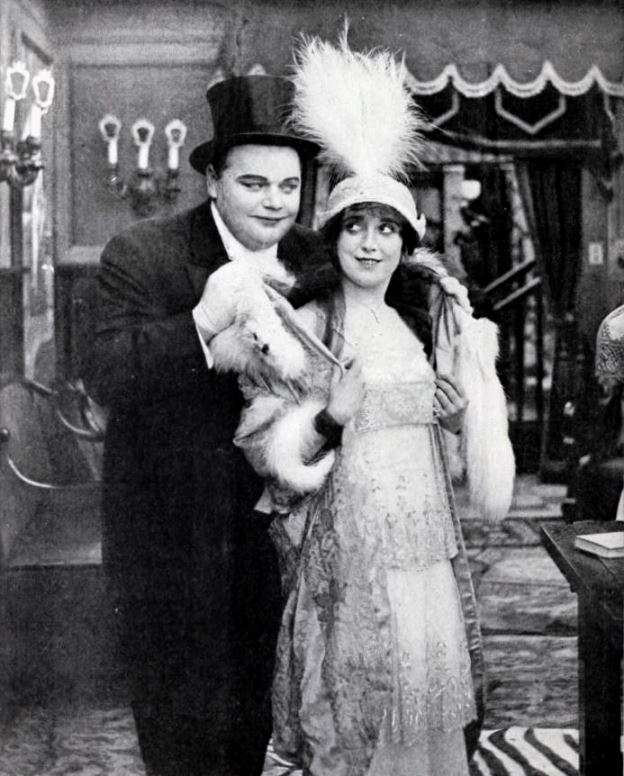
- Film still with Arbuckle and Normand
- Directed by: Roscoe Arbuckle
- Produced by: Mack Sennett
- Starring: Roscoe Arbuckle; Mabel Normand; Ford Sterling
- Music by: Rodney Sauer
- Distributed by: Mutual Film
- Release date: March 15, 1915
- Running time: 22 minutes
- Country: United States
- Language: Silent (English intertitles)

That Little Band of Gold is a 1915 American short comedy film directed by Roscoe "Fatty" Arbuckle and starring Arbuckle, Mabel Normand, and Ford Sterling.

== Plot ==
As described in a film magazine, Hubby decides to steal a night off away from the domestic joys of home, wife, and mother-in-law, and plans a pleasant little supper with an interesting lady friend at a notable cafe. His enthusiasm is a trifle dashed when he sees a friend at a nearby table, and his plans are scattered entirely to the winds at the horrified entrance of an indignant mother-in-law and his neglected wife.

== Cast ==
- Roscoe "Fatty" Arbuckle as Hubby
- Mabel Normand as Wifey
- Ford Sterling as Gassy Gotrox
- Alice Davenport as Mabel's Mother
- Phyllis Allen as Audience Member (uncredited)
- Charles Arling as Maitre D' (uncredited)
- Don Barclay
- Glen Cavender as Judge (uncredited)
- Charley Chase as Ticket Box Man / Man in Front Row (uncredited)
- Dixie Chene
- Edward F. Cline as Audience Member (uncredited)
- Minta Durfee as Woman in Front Row (uncredited)
- Vivian Edwards as Dining Customer (uncredited)
- May Emory as Maud Brightlights (uncredited)
- Frank Hayes as Butler (uncredited)
- Edgar Kennedy as Diner / Man in Audience (uncredited)
- Charles Lakin as Page Boy (uncredited)
- Hank Mann
- Harry McCoy as Man in Front Row (uncredited)
- Dora Rodgers
- Al St. John as Waiter (uncredited)
- Slim Summerville as Waiter / Audience Member (uncredited)
- Mack Swain as Audience Member (uncredited)

== See also ==
- Fatty Arbuckle filmography
