= Edward Dillon (actor) =

American actor and director

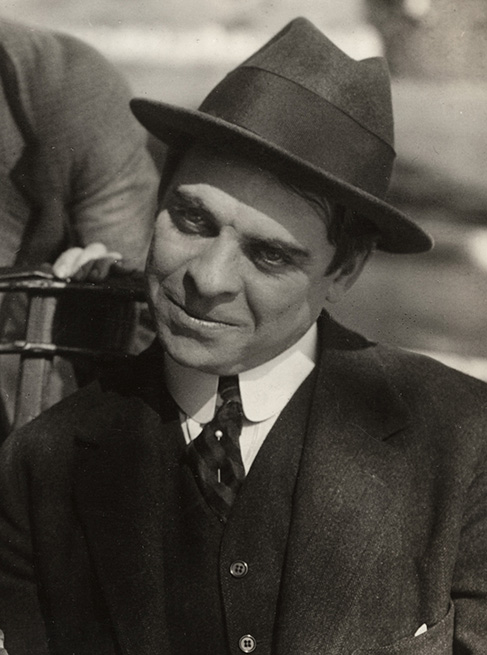
- Dillon in Ethel Gets Consent (1915)
- Born: 1872 or 1873; New York City, U.S.
- Died: July 11, 1933 (aged 60); Hollywood, California, U.S.
- Other name: Eddie Dillon
- Occupations: Actor; film director; screenwriter
- Years active: 1905–1932
- Relatives: John T. Dillon (brother)

Edward Dillon (1872 or 1873 or 1879 or 1882– July 11, 1933) was an American actor, director and screenwriter of the silent era.

== Early and personal life ==
Dillon was born in 1872, 1873, 1879 or 1882, in New York City. His brother John T. Dillon was also an actor. He married Franc Newman in October 1914, and they divorced sometime before 1930. Newman kept her married name, Dillon. She attended his funeral in 1933, and afterward listed herself as a widow rather than divorced.

== Career ==
Dillon's work on Broadway included acting in Prince Otto (1900), Francesca da Rimini (1901), The Taming of the Shrew (1905), and The Ranger (1907). He left the stage to begin acting in films in 1908, working under D. W. Griffith at Biograph. He performed in more than 320 films between 1905 and 1932 and also directed 134 productions between 1913 and 1926. He was Mary Pickford's first leading man, and he was instrumental in Fay Tincher's developing into a star. He was known as an "ace" director for D. W. Griffith. In 1915 he was described as a director for Komic Pictures Company when a fire devastated his home.

Dillon died on July 11, 1933, at the age of 60 in Hollywood, California, from a heart attack.

== Selected filmography ==
=== Actor ===
- The Invisible Fluid (1908, Short) – Messenger
- Bobby's Kodak (1908, Short) – Father
- When Knights Were Bold (1908) *short
- The Fight for Freedom (1908, Short) – Man in Bar / Member of the Posse
- The Kentuckian (1908, Short) – Ward Fatherly
- Monday Morning in a Coney Island Police Court (1908, Short)
- Where the Breakers Roar (1908, Short) – Policeman
- After Many Years (1908, Short)
- The Feud and the Turkey (1908, Short)
- The Reckoning (1908, Short)
- The Welcome Burglar (1909, Short)
- The Brahma Diamond (1909, Short)
- In the Border States (1910, Short) – Confederate Soldier (uncredited)
- A Flash of Light (1910, Short) – At First Party
- The Modern Prodigal (1910, Short) – Guard
- The Lucky Toothache (1910, Short) – One of the Boys
- The Fugitive (1910, Short) – John – the Confederate Son
- A Mohawk's Way (1910, Short) – Friend
- What Shall We Do with Our Old? (1911, Short) – In Shop
- Fisher Folks (1911, Short) – At Fair
- The Lonedale Operator (1911, Short) – The Telegrapher
- Priscilla's April Fool Joke (1911, Short) – Paul
- Priscilla and the Umbrella (1911, Short) – Harry
- Enoch Arden (1911, Short) – Rescuer
- A Country Cupid (1911, Short) – Among Students
- The Miser's Heart (1911, Short) – Down-and-Out Young Man
- The Old Bookkeeper (1912, Short) – The Old Bookkeeper's Employer's Friend – the Office Visitor
- For His Son (1912, Short) – At Soda Fountain (uncredited)
- The Root of Evil (1912, Short) – The Wealthy Man's Secretary – the Daughter's Husband
- A Voice from the Deep (1912, Short) – Percy
- Help! Help! (1912, Short) – Office Worker
- Won by a Fish (1912, Short) – Harry
- The Spirit Awakened (1912, Short) – The Christian Farmhand
- Blind Love (1912, Short) – The Young Man
- His Auto's Maiden Trip (1912, Short) – Mr. Jinx
- The Informer (1912, Short) – Confederate Soldier
- Love in an Apartment Hotel (1913, Short) – Pinky Doolan – a Bellboy
- Broken Ways (1913, Short) – Minor Role (uncredited)
- The Little Tease (1913, Short) – In Lunchroom
- Red Hicks Defies the World (1913, Short) – O'Shea, the Fighting Irishman
- Almost a Wild Man (1913, Short) – Rooly, Pooly, Dooly
- The Mothering Heart (1913, Short) – Club Patron (uncredited)
- An Indian's Loyalty (1913, Short) – The Young Foreman
- Judith of Bethulia (1914) – Minor Role (uncredited)
- Home, Sweet Home (1914) – The Musician
- Nell's Eugenic Wedding (1914, Short)
- Fatty and the Heiress (1914, Short)
- Fatty and Minnie He-Haw (1914, Short)
- Shotguns That Kick (1914, Short)
- Fatty's Wine Party (1914, Short)
- Fatty's Jonah Day (1914, Short)
- An Incompetent Hero (1914, Short)
- Lovers' Post Office (1914, Short)
- Don Quixote (1915)
- Mr. Goode, Samaritan (1916) – Shifty Ed
- Intolerance (1916) – Crook
- The Lady Drummer (1916)
- America (1924) – Minor Role (uncredited)
- The Skyrocket (1926)
- Lilac Time (1928) – Corporal 'Smithie'
- The Broadway Melody (1929) – Dillon – Stage Manager (uncredited)
- The Locked Door (1929) – Minor Role (uncredited)
- Hot for Paris (1929) – Ship's Cook
- Caught Short (1930) – Mr. Thutt
- Reducing (1931) – Train passenger (uncredited)
- Iron Man (1931) – Jeff
- Sob Sister (1931) – Pat
- The Trial of Vivienne Ware (1932) – Mr. Hardy (uncredited)
- While Paris Sleeps (1932) – Concierge's Husband
- Week Ends Only (1932) – Guest – Sitting / Standing Gag (uncredited)
- The Golden West (1932) – Pat (uncredited)
- Sherlock Holmes (1932) – Al (uncredited)

=== Director ===
- With the Aid of Phrenology (1913)
- Chocolate Dynamite (1914)
- Those Happy Days (1914)
- The Sky Pirate (1914)
- The Alarm (1914)
- Nell's Eugenic Wedding (1914)
- Sunshine Dad (1916)
- A Daughter of the Poor (1917)
- The Antics of Ann (1917)
- Might and the Man (1917)
- The Embarrassment of Riches (1918)
- Our Little Wife (1918)
- Luck and Pluck (1919)
- The Frisky Mrs. Johnson (1920)
- A Heart to Let (1921)
- Women Men Marry (1922)
- Broadway Gold (1923)
- The Speeding Venus (1926)
- Bred in Old Kentucky (1926)
- The Danger Girl (1926)

=== Radio ===
The Edwin/Dillon Show (January 15, 1928 – July 13, 1928) (Distributed by KSTP St. Paul and The Film Booking Offices of America)
