= Chocolate Dynamite =

1914 comedy film

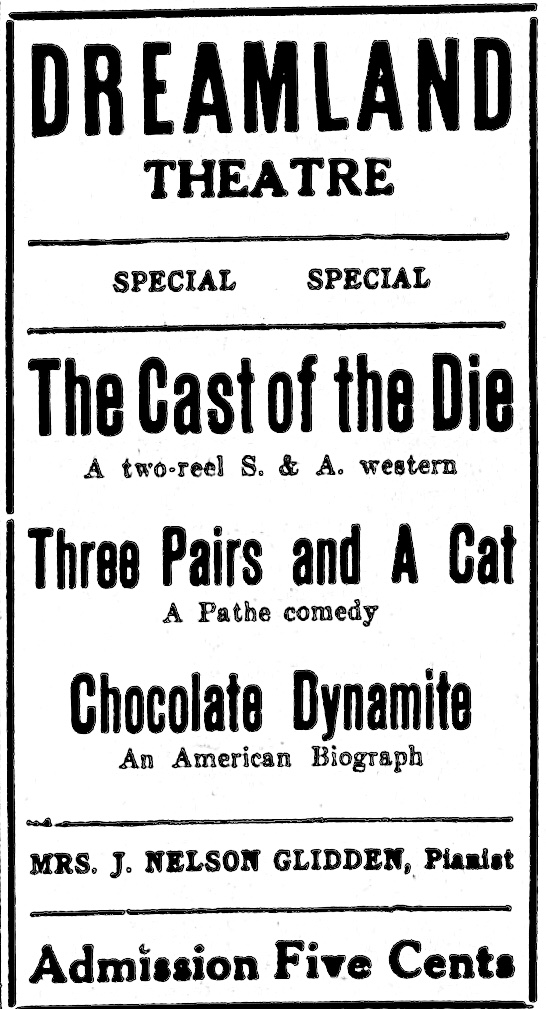
- The comedy featured in Vermont theater ad with Essanay and Pathé films, May 1914
- Directed by: Lionel Barrymore or Edward Dillon (both unverified by surviving studio records)
- Written by: Helen Combes
- Produced by: Biograph Company; New York, N.Y.
- Starring: Unknown
- Distributed by: General Film Company
- Release date: February 28, 1914
- Running time: Approximately 6.5 minutes (435–447 feet); released on "split reel" with the comedy short Because of a Hat (Note: According to the reference How Movies Work by Bruce F. Kawin (New York: Macmillan Publishing Company, 1987, pp. 46-47), a full 1000-foot reel of film in the silent era had a maximum running time between 15 and 16 minutes. Silent films were generally projected at an average or "standard" speed of 16 frames per second, much slower than the 24 frames of later sound films. Split reels therefore could not accommodate two or more shorts that had a combined length that exceeded 1000 feet.)
- Country: United States
- Languages: Silent; English intertitles

Chocolate Dynamite is a lost 1914 American silent comedy film produced by the Biograph Company and according to some modern references, directed by either Lionel Barrymore or Edward Dillon. Little is known about many aspects of this short, which had an approximate running time between six and seven minutes. No Biograph studio records have been found that conclusively identify its director or mention by name a single actor in the production. Records do document that the motion picture was based on "Captured by Dynamite", a short story written by Helen Combes. They also document that the comedy was filmed in New York City and was actually completed in late August 1913, a full six months before the company officially released it to theaters. During the picture's initial distribution in the United States, it was shipped on a "split reel", a term used in the silent era to describe a reel that held more than one motion picture. The film reel for Chocolate Dynamite also included Because of a Hat, another Biograph comedy short.

No theatrical copy, negative footage, contact prints, or film stills from this motion picture are listed in major film repositories or library collections in North America or Europe. This comedy is therefore presumed to be lost.

== Plot ==
The film's storyline centered on the young daughter of a woman who manages a small general store. Few descriptions of the comedy have been located in copies of 1914 film-industry publications available in library collections and in online reference sites such as the Internet Archive and the Media History Digital Library. A two-sentence synopsis of the plot can be found in the February 28, 1914 issue of the New York trade journal The Moving Picture World, which simply states, "The night May's mother is indisposed tramps break into the store. May settles them with dynamite—no explosion, but quite as effective. Two weeks later, in its March 14 issue, The Moving Picture World provides a bit longer description of the comedy, although it is a summary that offers greater insight into the varying emotional tones of the characters and settings rather than any details about the story's performers or any particulars about some scenes:

CHOCOLATE DYNAMITE (Biograph), Feb. 28.—A pictureplay comedy with moments that border on the tragic. It is rural in atmosphere and full of ginger. It elucidates the quick wit of a girl under trying circumstances. She causes the arrest of two tramp burglars by a strategic movement worthy of a general; the denouement causes spontaneous laughter. The girl deserves mention for good work.

Fortunately, despite the lack of insightful summaries of the comedy's plot in contemporary trade papers and journals, a brief but very helpful description of the story and a five-page, scene-by-scene typed outline of the film's shooting sequences survive in the Library of Congress. The outline also includes transcriptions of the motion picture's intertitles or "Sub-titles", along with their specific locations between scenes in the footage. All of this paperwork was part of the documentation that Biograph submitted to the federal government in February 1914 to obtain copyright protection for the production prior to its release to theaters. The plot's description in those copyright papers is given as follows:

May and her mother kept the country grocery store. That night May's mother had a headache and May agreed to assume the management of affairs. After all the customers had gone, May put the money in the safe and went to bed. Two burglars looking in the window, [sic] saw May put the money away and broke into the store shortly after May [had retired]. May heard them and came to the rescue. May's mother also heard and came in. At that point May was seized with an inspiration. A box of candy near-by was marked "Dynamite", but which really contained a large chocolate candy stick. May seized the stick and held it in the air just over the burglar's head, while her mother notified the sheriff of police by telephone. At last he arrived and the tramps were arrested. They broke loose from the sheriff, but May again held them up by throwing the box of dynamite after their retreating figures, and thus they were recaptured.

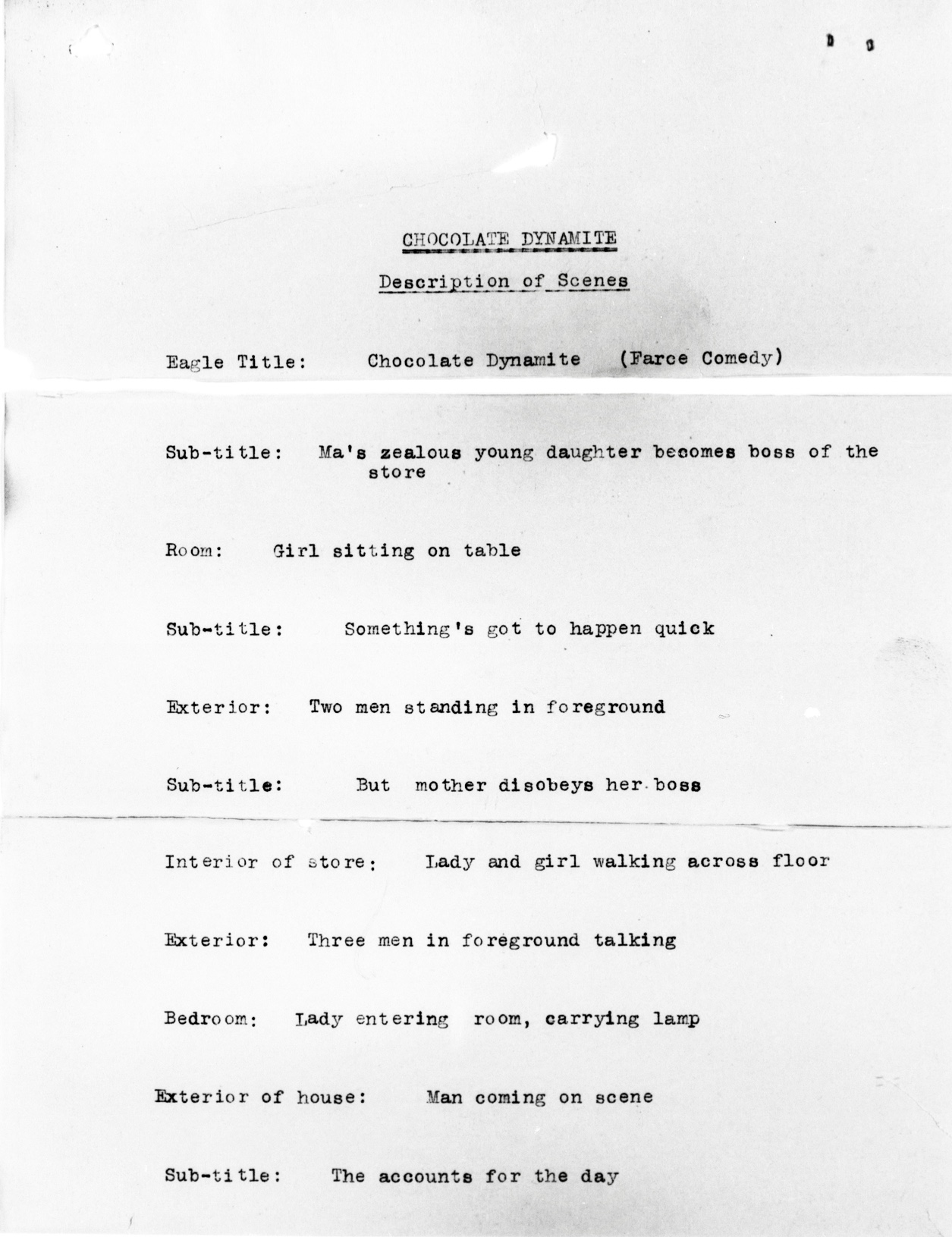
One page from outline of scenes submitted by Biograph to the federal government to copyright the film in 1914.

== Cast ==
In the early 1980s, after examining all surviving studio records and other assorted period documentation relating to films produced by Biograph from 1908 through 1913, the four compilers of the 1985 reference D. W. Griffith and the Biograph Company pointedly state about Chocolate Dynamite, "No material survives from which the cast can be determined". The previously noted 1914 copyright documents also do not identify by name any of the cast members in the comedy, although those documents do provide a basic accounting of the five principal roles in the "photoplay" and indicate the scenes in which each actor appeared.:

- May, the "heroine" (unknown performer)
- May's mother (unknown performer)
- Burglar number 1 (unknown performer)
- Burglar number 2 (unknown performer)
- Sheriff (unknown performer)

== Production ==
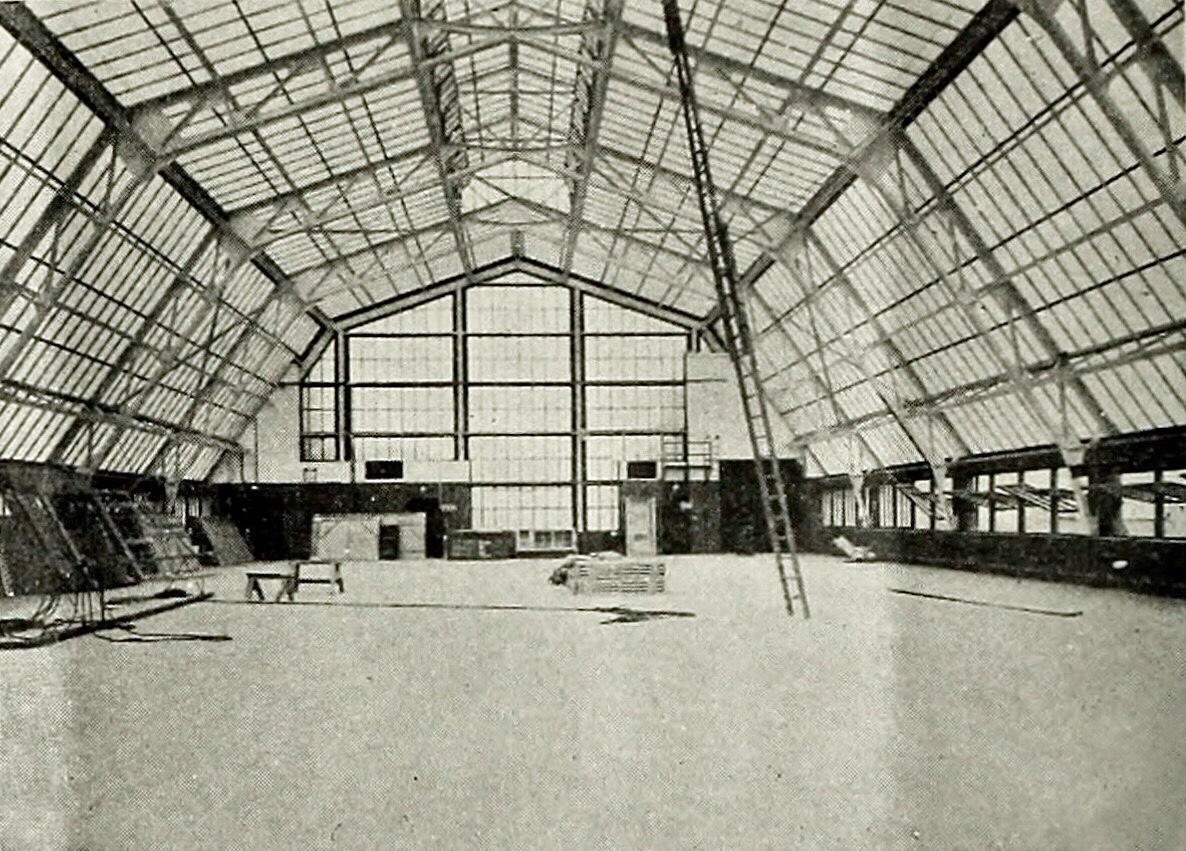
The short was filmed in New York City, either in Biograph's new glass-enclosed studio in The Bronx or at the company's old facility in Manhattan.

According to studio records also cited in the reference D. W. Griffith and the Biograph Company, the comedy was shot in New York City and filming was "finished" on August 28, 1913, a full six months before the short's release. The company at that time was in the process of completing the move of its studio operations and offices from a converted brownstone mansion at 11 East 14th Street in the city's borough of Manhattan to much larger, state-of-the-art facilities in another borough, The Bronx, and located there at 807 East 175th Street. While the interior scenes for Chocolate Dynamite may have been shot at the Bronx site, Biograph records state only that the picture was filmed in "New York". By the late summer of 1913, at the very time this comedy was in production, the company remained in the final stages of transitioning to its new facilities and completing the constructing of support buildings and installing updated equipment. It is possible then that this very modest motion picture was either among the first to be filmed at the new studio on 175th Street or perhaps was one of the last films to be shot at the old Manhattan studio on 14th Street.

=== Direction ===
The identity of this film's director remains uncertain. Two names—Lionel Barrymore and Edward Dillon—are cited as the possible head of this production. After examining all available Biograph studio records for the noted period from 1908 through 1913, (Note: The cited reference D. W. Griffith and the Biograph Company includes production records on motion pictures that were produced by the studio through December 1913. Some of the films that were completed that year are classified as 1914 pictures since they were not released until the first quarter of that year, including Chocolate Dynamite.) the four compilers of the 1985 reference D. W. Griffith and the Biograph Company question whether Barrymore actually directed the project. Their doubt is indicated by the inclusion of a question mark in that reference's attribution to the short's director: "Lionel Barrymore?". There is another reference to Lionel overseeing the film's production in Margot Peters' 1990 biography of the three famous Barrymore siblings titled The House of Barrymore. (Note: The three famous Barrymore siblings and actors who are covered in Margot Peters' extensive work The House of Barrymore are Lionel Barrymore, Ethel Barrymore, and John Barrymore.) That secondary source lists Lionel in a filmography as "(d[irector] only)" of Chocolate Dynamite. There is, however, no corroborating document given in this work—neither a Biograph record, a period trade publication, nor any specific personal papers of Barrymore's—that confirms this credit.

The crediting of Edward Dillon is also unverified by contemporary studio records, but his name is given as the director in Early Cinema History Online, a database created and still maintained, as of 2023, by Derek Long, an assistant professor of Media and Cinema Studies at the University of Illinois at Urbana-Champaign Dillon already had five years of experience at Biograph as a screen actor by the time Chocolate Dynamite was filmed, specializing in comedic performances in numerous company releases. He also worked as the director of the company's comedy unit, serving in that capacity until an unspecified date in 1913.

=== Screenplay and filming outline ===
The screenplay for this film is based on a short story, "Captured by Dynamite," credited to the "authoress" Helen Combes. Combes is also recognized in earlier Biograph records for writing the "scenario" for one other company film, the eight-minute comedy Their One Good Suit, which was released in March 1913, five months before the production of Chocolate Dynamite and almost a year before the initial distribution of this short. That same year Combes authored too the storyline for Love, the Winner, a drama produced by Selig Polyscope Company, another major film company based in Chicago, not in New York.

The documents submitted by the Biograph Company in 1914 to obtain copyright protection for this film include the basic outline used by the production's director and cinematographer for planning, shooting, and editing the picture. Five pages of that typed document comprise a running list of camera shots by set locations as well as points where intertitles were inserted between scenes. Portions of the sequential entries selected from pages one and two of this outline provide some insight into the short's general structure:

Page 1

- "Eagle Title [Biograph logo]: Chocolate Dynamite (Farce Comedy)"
- "Sub-title: Ma's zealous young daughter becomes boss of the store"
- "Room: Girl sitting on table"
- "Sub-title: Something's got to happen quick"
- "Exterior: Two men standing in foreground"
- "Sub-title: But mother disobeys her boss"
- "Interior of store: Lady and girl walking across floor"...

Page 2

- "...Interior of store: Girl in store"
- "Exterior of house: Men crouching near window"
- "Interior of store: Girl near safe"
- "Exterior of house: Men crouching near window"
- "Interior of store: Girl standing in foreground"
- "Exterior of house: Men crouching near window"
- "Interior of store:" [no action notation, likely generic shot]

== Release, promotion, and distribution ==
On February 28, 1914, Biograph officially released Chocolate Dynamite and its split-reel companion, the 580-foot comedy Because of a Hat starring Charles Murray. The studio did not actively promote either one of these brief films in the weeks prior to and after their release, opting instead to provide only minimal information about them to trade journals and newspapers. Very limited promotion of such "little" films was not an unusual practice by 1914, a time when most American film studios were rapidly expanding their investments in making and advertising much longer, far more elaborate multiple-reel productions. (Note: Among the reasons attributed to the decline of both Biograph and Edison Studios after 1913 were that both companies were slower than their competitors in producing much longer, multiple-reel films for theater audiences. That lag on the part of Biograph is cited as a major reason why director D. W. Griffith, who wanted "to make bigger and better films", left the company in October 1913 to join Mutual Film Corporation in California. See pages 88–90 in the 1973 autobiography Billy Bitzer: His Story (published posthumously), which is cited in greater detail under "References" on this page.) Not surprisingly then, a survey of those publications reveal neither basic assessments of the shorts' plots nor even moderately detailed descriptions of any scenes in them.

=== Foreign marketing ===
Chocolate Dynamite and Because of a Hat continued to circulate to domestic and foreign theaters for more than a year after their initial distribution. Less than a month after the shorts' release in the United States, the two comedies were being marketed overseas. In Great Britain, for example, film exchanges in London began advertising both comedies as early as mid-March 1914 in the British trade periodical The Bioscope. The Magnet Film Company notified readers of The Bioscope that the shorts would soon be available either for purchase or as rentals to local cinemas and to other motion picture houses throughout England and as far north as Glasgow, Scotland. Another London exchange, M. P. Sales Agency, states in a supplement to the April 23, 1914 issue of The Bioscope that copies of Chocolate Dynamite would be ready for distribution on May 7. That notice also includes a single sentence summarizing the comedy's plot: "Tramps break into a village store, but a ready-witted girl removes them by an ingenious trick". One difference between the marketing of Chocolate Dynamite and Because of a Hat in Great Britain compared to the films' distribution in the United States is that in England the comedies were offered individually for sale or as rentals to cinemas, not together on a split reel.

== Lost film ==
Not a single film still from Chocolate Dynamite is published in available period trade publications from 1914. Also, general surveys of the holdings of major film repositories, archives, and silent-film databases in North America and Europe do not list any positive footage, partial film negatives, a paper-print roll, or any photograph related to the production. Some of the institutions surveyed include the Library of Congress, the George Eastman Museum, the collection of moving images at the Museum of Modern Art, the UCLA Film and Television Archives, the National Film Preservation Foundation the Library and Archives Canada (LAC), the British Film Institute, Cinémathèque Française, the EYE Filmmuseum in Amsterdam, and other catalogs for silent motion pictures accessible through the European Film Gateway (EFG). Currently, this film, like the vast majority of motion pictures produced in the United States during the silent era, is presumed to be lost.

== External links and category searches ==
- Chocolate Dynamite at IMDb
