= A Misplaced Foot =

1914 film

- Directed by: Wilfred Lucas
- Starring: Fatty Arbuckle
- Release date: January 1, 1914
- Country: United States
- Languages: Silent; English intertitles

A Misplaced Foot is a 1914 American short comedy film starring Fatty Arbuckle.

== Cast ==
- Roscoe "Fatty" Arbuckle
- Minta Durfee
- Hank Mann
- Mabel Normand
- Ford Sterling
- Al St. John

== See also ==
- List of American films of 1914
- Fatty Arbuckle filmography
