= Chased Into Love =

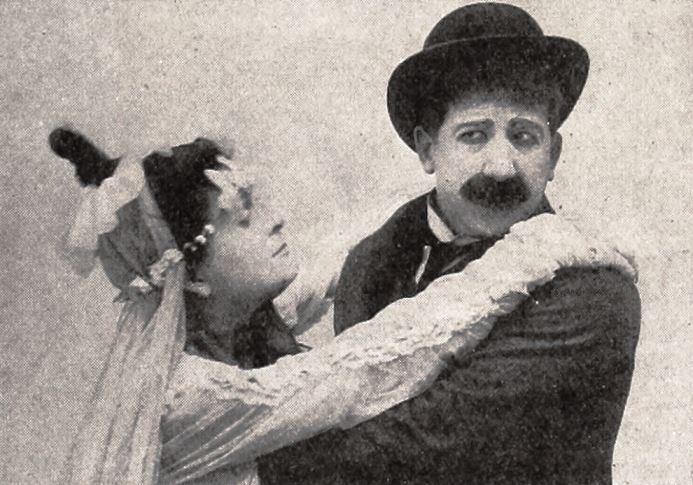
- Still with Phillips and Mann
- Directed by: Charley Chase
- Produced by: William Fox
- Starring: Charley Chase; Hank Mann; Carmen Phillips
- Cinematography: Jack Wagner
- Distributed by: Fox Film Corporation
- Release date: February 12, 1917
- Running time: 2 reels
- Country: United States
- Language: Silent (English intertitles)

Chased Into Love is a lost 1917 American silent short comedy film directed by and starring Charles Parrot (alias Charley Chase) along with Hank Mann and Carmen Phillips. It was produced and distributed by Fox Film Corporation.

== Cast ==
- Hank Mann as The Bridegroom-to-Be
- Carmen Phillips as The Bride-to-Be
- John Lancaster as Her Father
- Joe Lee as The Lover
- Charles Arling as The Lawyer
- Charley Chase
