= Fatty's Wine Party =

1914 film

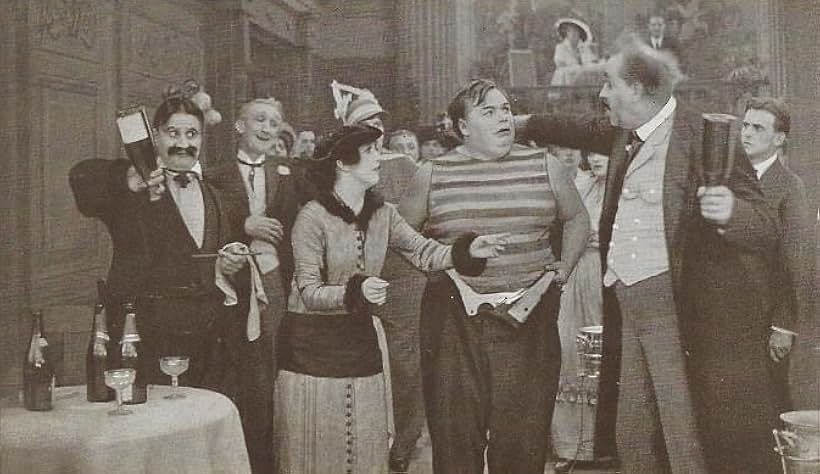
- Directed by: Fatty Arbuckle
- Produced by: Mack Sennett
- Starring: Fatty Arbuckle
- Distributed by: Mutual Film
- Release date: November 21, 1914
- Country: United States
- Languages: Silent; English intertitles

Fatty's Wine Party is a 1914 American short comedy film directed by and starring Fatty Arbuckle.

== Cast ==
- Roscoe "Fatty" Arbuckle
- Syd Chaplin
- Alice Davenport
- Edward Dillon (as Eddie Dillon)
- Minta Durfee
- Mabel Normand
- Mack Swain

== See also ==
- List of American films of 1914
- Roscoe Arbuckle filmography
