= Fatty at San Diego =

1913 film

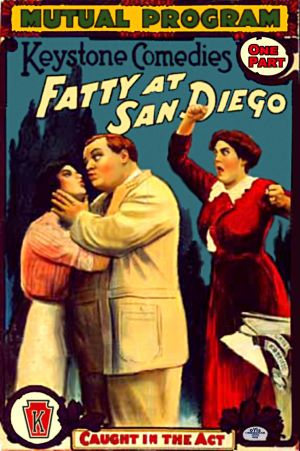
- Theatrical poster to Fatty at San Diego
- Directed by: George Nichols
- Starring: Fatty Arbuckle; Mabel Normand
- Release date: November 3, 1913
- Country: United States
- Languages: Silent; English intertitles

Fatty at San Diego is a 1913 American short comedy film featuring Fatty Arbuckle and Mabel Normand.

== Plot ==
Fatty sneaks off to the Carnival Cabrillo parade in San Diego. He tells his wife that he saved an endangered child, but his alibi is punctured by newsreel footage.

== Cast ==
The cast included:

- Roscoe "Fatty" Arbuckle: Fatty
- Phyllis Allen: His Wife
- Minta Durfee: Girl at Carnival
- Nick Cogley: Her Husband
- Billy Gilbert: Theater Patron / Man at Dock
- Charles Inslee, Peggy Pearce, Charles Avery: Theater Patrons

== See also ==
- Roscoe Arbuckle filmography
