= Fatty's Flirtation =

1913 film

- Directed by: George Nichols
- Starring: Roscoe Arbuckle; Mabel Normand
- Release date: December 18, 1913
- Country: United States
- Languages: Silent; English intertitles

Fatty's Flirtation is a 1913 American short comedy film featuring Roscoe "Fatty" Arbuckle and Mabel Normand.

== Plot ==
Fatty's romantic attentions to Mabel lead to a slap in the face, and an encounter with the Keystone Cops.

== Cast ==
The cast included:

- Roscoe Arbuckle as Fatty
- Mabel Normand as Mabel
- Minta Durfee as Minta
- Frank Cooley as Desk Sergeant
- Hank Mann as Cop
- George Jeske as Cop

== See also ==
- Roscoe Arbuckle filmography
