= A Game of Pool (film) =

1913 film

A Game of Pool is an extant American silent film from 1913. It is the first American movie about the game of pool ever made and includes special effects. It stars Edgar Kennedy, Fred Mace, Ford Sterling, and Mack Sennett (who also directed and produced the movie). It was a Keystone comedy film.

The cast also includes Wilfred Lucas, Fred Gamble, Billy Gilbert, and Edgar Kennedy.

The film was released on August 7, 1913. The 1912 Frank Wilson film from Britain, Billiards Mad, preceded it.
