= That Ragtime Band =

1913 film

- Directed by: Mack Sennett
- Produced by: Mack Sennett
- Starring: Ford Sterling; Mabel Normand
- Release date: May 1, 1913
- Country: United States
- Language: Silent with English intertitles

That Ragtime Band is a 1913 American short comedy film directed by Mack Sennett. In the plot, a professor (Ford Sterling) ejects a trumpeter (Nick Cogley) from his concert band because they both like the same woman (Mabel Normand). The professor is pelted with vegetables and eggs when the band next performs; he responds with a fire hose. "The result cannot be described, and must be seen to be enjoyed," according to the film's publicity.

== Cast ==
- Ford Sterling as Prof. Smelts
- Mabel Normand as Mabel
- Nick Cogley as Rival musician
- Alice Davenport as Mabel's mother
- Laura Oakley as Tall Fatima Sister
- Edgar Kennedy as Stage Manager
- William Hauber as Man in Audience (uncredited)

That Ragtime Band (1913)
