= Those Happy Days (1914 film) =

1914 film

- Directed by: Fatty Arbuckle; Edward Dillon
- Starring: Fatty Arbuckle
- Release date: July 23, 1914
- Country: United States
- Languages: Silent; English intertitles

Those Happy Days is a 1914 American short comedy film directed by and starring Fatty Arbuckle.

== Cast ==
- Roscoe Arbuckle as Fatty
- Slim Summerville as the Annoyed Neighbor
- Chester Conklin
- Minta Durfee
- Mack Swain

== See also ==
- List of American films of 1914
