= Fatty Joins the Force =

1913 film

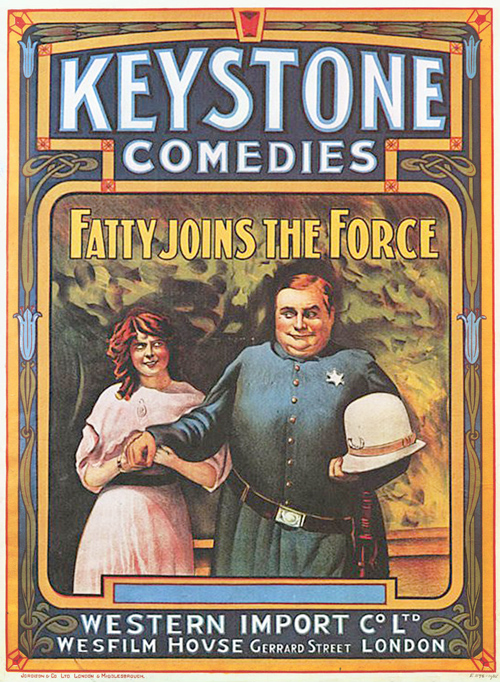
- Film poster
- Directed by: George Nichols
- Written by: Mack Sennett
- Produced by: Mack Sennett
- Starring: Fatty Arbuckle
- Distributed by: Keystone Film Company
- Release date: November 24, 1913
- Running time: 12 minutes
- Country: United States
- Language: Silent with English intertitles

Fatty Joins the Force is a 1913 American silent short comedy film featuring Fatty Arbuckle. It features the Keystone Cops in a background role.

== Plot ==
Fatty is an obese and timid man who is walking in the park with his girlfriend. A handsome policeman passes and the girl is attracted. The policeman joins a young lady and a girl on a bench. The girl gets up and walks along the stones edging a pond and falls in. Fatty's girlfriend forces him to help and pushes him into the pond. He reluctantly rescues the little girl from drowning.

The rescued girl is the daughter of the Police Commissioner. The grateful Commissioner offers Fatty a job on the Police Force. Fatty's girlfriend thinks this is a good idea so Fatty accepts.

At Police Headquarters the Commissioner introduces Fatty to the Keystone Cops. He is given a police uniform and the cops salute him before he goes out on his first beat.

His girlfriend takes his arm as they walk down an avenue. They encounter two men brawling. He takes his truncheon out and stands between the men. They hit him and knock him over then run off.

He sits on a park bench with his girlfriend but five boys having a picnic start throwing food at him. One creeps up behind him then pushes a large treacle tart into his face. The boys run off. Fatty decides to have a bath in the pond and strips to his underwear, leaving his uniform hanging on a bush. The boys rematerialise and cut up his trousers and steal his jacket and throw it into the reeds. Fatty puts on the torn trousers. A stranger finds his police jacket and takes it to Police Headquarters. The police conclude that Fatty has drowned. Back in the park Fatty scares two women with his odd attire and they run to fetch two policemen. Meanwhile his policeman friends are dragging the pond to look for his body, with his hysterical girlfriend at the edge. Fatty hides in the bushes.

At the pond the police boat sinks. The police headquarters goes into mourning but the other two policemen are dragging Fatty back. Fatty salutes the police chief and turns to hug his girlfriend but she shuns him.

Fatty is put behind bars and the girlfriend finds solace in the arms of the police chief.

== Cast ==
The cast included:

- Roscoe "Fatty" Arbuckle as Fatty
- Dot Farley as Fatty's wife
- Minta Durfee as Nursemaid
- Edgar Kennedy as Policeman in the park
- George Nichols as Police Commissioner
- William White as Police Captain
- Charles Avery as Desk Sergeant
- Mack Swain as Policeman

== Preservation ==
A 35mm copy is held by George Eastman House, gifted by Luigi Pallme in 1998. The film was released along with thirty other of Roscoe Arbuckle's films on DVD in 2005 by Mackinac Media, who is now defunct.

== See also ==
- Roscoe Arbuckle filmography
