= Roscoe Arbuckle filmography =

Filmography

These are the films of the American silent film actor, comedian, director, and screenwriter Roscoe "Fatty" Arbuckle. Films marked with a diamond (♦) were directed by and featured Arbuckle. He used the name William Goodrich on the films he directed from 1924 onward.

Arbuckle's films share the common fate of most silent movies. Of the hundreds of features and shorts in which he appeared between 1909 and 1933, only about half are known to have survived, and many exist only in fragmentary form. Further, there is no single source from which the remaining Arbuckle library can be accessed. Surviving prints, negatives, stills and other materials are scattered around the globe, held by various corporations, government institutions, museums and private collectors.

As an actor: Early years - 1913 - 1914 - 1915 - 1916 - 1917 - 1918 - 1919 - 1920 - 1921 - Later years

As a director only: 1910s - 1922 - 1924 - 1925 - 1926 - 1927 - 1930 - 1931 - 1932 - References

== As an actor ==
=== Early years ===
- Ben's Kid (1909)
- Mrs. Jones' Birthday (1909)
- Making It Pleasant for Him (1909)
- The Sanitarium (1910)
- A Voice from the Deep (1912)

=== 1913 ===
- Help! Help! Hydrophobia!
- Safe in Jail
- Murphy's I.O.U.
- Alas! Poor Yorick!
- That Ragtime Band
- The Foreman of the Jury
- The Gangsters
- Passions, He Had Three
- The Waiters' Picnic
- Peeping Pete
- A Bandit
- For the Love of Mabel
- The Telltale Light
- A Noise from the Deep
- Love and Courage
- Professor Bean's Removal
- Almost a Rescue
- The Riot
- Mabel's New Hero
- Mabel's Dramatic Career
- The Gypsy Queen
- The Fatal Taxicab
- When Dreams Come True
- Mother's Boy
- Fatty's Day Off
- Two Old Tars
- A Quiet Little Wedding
- The Speed Kings
- Fatty at San Diego
- Wine
- Fatty Joins the Force
- The Woman Haters
- A Ride for a Bride
- Fatty's Flirtation
- His Sister's Kids
- Some Nerve
- He Would a Hunting Go

=== 1914 ===
- A Misplaced Foot
- Caught in a Flue
- The Under-Sheriff
- A Flirt's Mistake
- In the Clutches of the Gang
- Rebecca's Wedding Day
- A Robust Romeo
- Twixt Love and Fire
- A Film Johnnie
- Tango Tangles
- His Favorite Pastime
- A Rural Demon
- Barnyard Flirtations ♦
- The Chicken Chaser ♦
- A Bath House Beauty ♦
- Where Hazel Met the Villain ♦
- A Suspended Ordeal ♦
- The Water Dog ♦
- The Alarm ♦
- Our Country Cousin
- The Knockout
- Fatty and the Heiress ♦
- Fatty's Finish ♦
- Love and Bullets ♦
- A Rowboat Romance ♦
- The Sky Pirate ♦
- Bombs and Bangs
- Those Happy Days ♦
- That Minstrel Man ♦
- Those Country Kids ♦
- Fatty's Gift ♦
- The Masquerader
- His New Profession
- The Baggage Smasher
- A Brand New Hero ♦
- The Rounders
- Lover's Luck ♦
- Fatty's Debut ♦
- Killing Horace
- Fatty Again ♦
- Their Ups and Downs ♦
- Zip, the Dodger ♦
- Lovers' Post Office ♦
- An Incompetent Hero ♦
- Fatty's Jonah Day ♦
- Fatty's Wine Party ♦
- The Sea Nymphs ♦
- Among the Mourners
- Leading Lizzie Astray ♦
- Shotguns That Kick ♦
- Fatty's Magic Pants ♦
- Fatty and Minnie He-Haw ♦

=== 1915 ===
- Mabel and Fatty's Married Life ♦
- Rum and Wall Paper
- Mabel and Fatty's Wash Day ♦
- Mabel, Fatty and the Law ♦
- Fatty and Mabel's Simple Life ♦
- Fatty and Mabel at the San Diego Exposition ♦
- Fatty's New Role ♦
- Hogan's Romance Upset
- Fatty's Reckless Fling ♦
- Fatty's Chance Acquaintance ♦
- Fatty's Faithful Fido ♦
- That Little Band of Gold ♦
- Wished on Mabel
- When Love Took Wings ♦
- Mabel's Wilful Way
- Miss Fatty's Seaside Lovers ♦
- Fatty's Plucky Pup ♦
- The Little Teacher
- Fatty's Tintype Tangle ♦
- Fickle Fatty's Fall♦
- A Village Scandal ♦
- Fatty and the Broadway Stars ♦
- Mabel and Fatty Viewing the World's Fair at San Francisco ♦

=== 1916 ===
- Fatty and Mabel Adrift ♦
- He Did and He Didn't ♦
- Bright Lights ♦
- His Wife's Mistakes ♦
- The Other Man
- The Waiters' Ball ♦
- A Creampuff Romance ♦

=== 1917 ===
- The Butcher Boy ♦
- A Reckless Romeo ♦
- The Rough House ♦
- His Wedding Night ♦
- Oh Doctor! ♦
- Coney Island ♦
- A Country Hero ♦ (Lost film)

=== 1918 ===
- A Scrap of Paper ♦
- Out West ♦
- The Bell Boy ♦
- Moonshine ♦
- Good Night, Nurse! ♦
- The Cook ♦
- The Sheriff ♦

=== 1919 ===
- Camping Out ♦
- The Pullman Porter ♦
- Love ♦
- The Bank Clerk ♦
- A Desert Hero ♦
- Back Stage ♦
- The Hayseed ♦

=== 1920 ===
- The Garage ♦
- The Round-Up (Library of Congress) feature film
- The Life of the Party (Library of Congress, Gosfilmofond) feature film

=== 1921 ===
- Leap Year ♦ (*Library of Congress) feature film
- The Fast Freight (*lost) feature film
- Brewster's Millions (*lost) feature film
- The Dollar-a-Year Man (*lost) feature film
- The Traveling Salesman (*George Eastman House) feature film
- Gasoline Gus (*Gosfilmofond) feature film
- Crazy to Marry (*Gosfilmofond) feature film

=== Later years ===
- Character Studies (1923)
- Hollywood (1923) cameo as unemployed actor
- Go West (1925)
- Listen Lena (1927)
- Hey, Pop! (1932)
- In the Dough (1932)
- Buzzin' Around (1933)
- How've You Bean? (1933)
- Close Relations (1933)
- Tomalio (1933)

== As a director only ==
=== 1910s ===
- The Moonshiners (1916)

=== 1922 ===
- Special Delivery

=== 1924 ===
- Stupid, But Brave

=== 1925 ===
- The Iron Mule
- Curses!
- The Tourist
- The Movies
- Cleaning Up
- The Fighting Dude

=== 1926 ===
- My Stars
- Home Cured
- Fool's Luck
- His Private Life
- One Sunday Morning

=== 1927 ===
- The Red Mill
- Peaceful Oscar
- Special Delivery

=== 1930 ===
- Si Si Senor
- Won by a Neck
- Up a Tree

=== 1931 ===
- Three Hollywood Girls
- Marriage Rows
- Pete and Repeat
- Ex-Plumber
- Crashing Hollywood
- Windy Riley Goes Hollywood
- The Lure of Hollywood
- That's My Line
- Honeymoon Trio
- Up Pops the Duke
- Beach Pajamas
- Take 'em and Shake 'em
- That's My Meat
- One Quiet Night
- Queenie of Hollywood
- Once a Hero
- The Back Page
- The Tamale Vendor
- Idle Roomers
- Smart Work

=== 1932 ===
- It's a Cinch
- Moonlight and Cactus
- Keep Laughing
- Anybody's Goat
- Bridge Wives
- Hollywood Luck
- Hollywood Lights
- Gigolettes
- Niagara Falls
