= Ted Edwards (actor) =

American actor

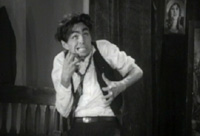
- Born: Maurice Edward Burrell; May 9, 1884; Sheffield, Yorkshire, England
- Died: September 29, 1945 (aged 61); Los Angeles, California, U.S.
- Parent(s): John William Burrell, Sarah Ann Burrell

Ted Edwards (born Maurice Edward Burrell; 9 May 1884 – 29 September 1945) was an English-born American film actor of the silent era. He appeared in several of Charlie Chaplin's comedy shorts

== Life and career ==
He was born in Sheffield, England, as Maurice Edward Burrell. He was one of nine children born to John William Burrell and his wife Sarah Ann. John Burrell was a draper with a shop at 59 Snig Hill, Sheffield; in later life the family lived at 80 Kendal Road in Hillsborough, Sheffield.

Taking the stage name Ted Edwards, he lived in Canada before moving to the U.S. and acting in stock companies and vaudeville. Between 1914 and 1917, he appeared in about 50 Keystone Studios comedy films, including over ten featuring Charlie Chaplin. He often played the role of a priest.

He retired from acting shortly afterwards, and worked as a carpenter and builder. He died in Los Angeles in 1945 at the age of 61.

According to researcher Brent Walker, he is not the same individual as the actor who appeared in Fires of Youth (1924), Maniac (1934), and Polygamy (1936).

== Selected filmography ==
- Ambrose's First Falsehood (1914)
- A Bath House Beauty (1914)
- Dough and Dynamite (1914)
- His Prehistoric Past (1914)
- Leading Lizzie Astray (1914)
- A Busy Day (1915)
- Tillie's Punctured Romance (1914)
- A Submarine Pirate (1915)
- Fatty's Faithful Fido (1915)
- Fatty's Plucky Pup (1915)
- Fatty's Tintype Tangle (1915)
- Fatty and Mabel at the San Diego Exposition (1915)
- Hearts and Planets (1915)
- Fatty's Reckless Fling (1915)
- Fatty's Chance Acquaintance (1915)
- Mabel and Fatty's Simple Life (1915)
- When Love Took Wings (1915)
- Are Waitresses Safe? (1917)
- A Dog's Life (1918) – Unemployed man
