= Minstrel Man =

Minstrel Man may refer to:

- The Minstrel Man, a 1980 music album by American country singer Willie Nelson
- Minstrel Man (film), a 1944 American film directed by Joseph H. Lewis
- Minstrel Man (1977 film), an American television film directed by William Graham

== See also ==
- That Minstrel Man, a 1914 American film directed by Roscoe "Fatty" Arbuckle and starring him and Ford Sterling
