= Nick Cogley =

American actor

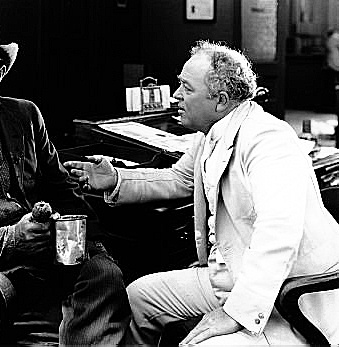
- Cogley in Honest Hutch (1920)
- Born: Nickolas P. J. Cogley; May 4, 1869; New York, New York, US
- Died: May 20, 1936 (aged 67); Santa Monica, California, US
- Years active: 1909–1934

Nickolas P. J. Cogley (May 4, 1869 – May 20, 1936) was an American actor, director and writer of the silent films. He appeared in more than 170 films between 1909 and 1934.

== Biography ==
Cogley was born in New York, New York. He attended St. Francis Xavier College in New York.

Cogley appeared in blackface in some of his roles. For example, in the Civil War film The Coward (1915) he played "A Negro Servant," and in Toby's Bow (1919) he portrayed the black servant "Uncle Toby" that gives the film its name. The use of blackface was not unusual in American silent films, and did not disappear until the 1930s when public sensibilities regarding race began to change and blackface became increasingly associated with racism and bigotry.

On stage, Cogley acted at New York's Lyceum Theatre for 25 years. He died in Santa Monica, California, following surgery.

== Partial filmography ==
- The Sanitarium (1910)
- The New Superintendent (1911)
- The Count of Monte Cristo (1912)
- Mabel's New Hero (1913)
- The Paymaster's Son (1913)
- A Noise from the Deep (1913)
- The Bangville Police (1913)
- That Ragtime Band (1913)
- Murphy's I.O.U. (1913)
- The Gangsters (1913)
- Passions, He Had Three (1913)
- Help! Help! Hydrophobia! (1913)
- Peeping Pete (1913)
- A Bandit (1913)
- The Gypsy Queen (1913)
- Mother's Boy (1913)
- Two Old Tars (1913)
- The Woman Haters (1913)
- In the Clutches of the Gang (1914)
- Tillie's Punctured Romance (1914) as Keystone Cop Desk Sergeant (uncredited)
- Love, Loot and Crash (1915)
- The Coward (1915)
- A La Cabaret (1916)
- Hearts and Sparks (1916)
- A Dash of Courage (1916)
- His Bread and Butter (1916)
- Stars and Bars (1917)
- Madam Who? (1918)
- Maid o' the Storm (1918)
- Inside the Lines (1918)
- Sis Hopkins (1919)
- Toby's Bow (1919)
- Jes' Call Me Jim (1920)
- Guile of Women (1921)
- Beating the Game (1921)
- The Old Nest (1921) as Uncle Ned
- An Unwilling Hero as
- One Clear Call (1922)
- The Marriage Chance (1922)
- Restless Souls (1922)
- Desire (1923)
- Crinoline and Romance (1923)
- The Dramatic Life of Abraham Lincoln (1924)
- Hey! Hey! Cowboy (1927)
- The Missing Link (1927)
- The Heart of Maryland (1927)
- In Old Kentucky (1927)
- Abie's Irish Rose (1928)
- Treason (1933)
- Cross Fire (1933)
