= Wished on Mabel =

1915 film

- Directed by: Mabel Normand
- Produced by: Mack Sennett, Keystone Film Company
- Starring: Roscoe Arbuckle; Mabel Normand
- Release date: March 19, 1915
- Running time: 12 minutes
- Country: United States
- Languages: Silent; English intertitles

Wished on Mabel is a 1915 American short silent comedy film. It was filmed at Golden Gate Park in San Francisco, California, and directed by Mabel Normand. The short also co-stars Normand and Roscoe "Fatty" Arbuckle.

== Plot ==
This "farce comedy" begins with an older, well-dressed woman sitting down on a park bench with her daughter Mabel. With a magazine in hand, "Mama" proceeds to read to the obviously bored young woman, whose spirits are lifted when nearby she sees her boyfriend "Fatty". Mabel motions to him to come sit with them. After sneaking a few quick kisses with Mabel, Fatty takes her away so they can spend time together, leaving Mama alone on the bench.

Elsewhere, a strolling "Keystone Cop" encounters a man sleeping on another park bench. The policeman uses his nightstick and foot to chase away the loiterer, who promptly spies Mama sitting by herself. Clearly an experienced thief, he sidles up to her and uses a small pair of scissors to steal a ladies' pocket-style watch suspended from her neck by a long ribbon. The thief hastily departs with the watch. Once Mama notices her timepiece is missing, she yells for help, which rouses the policeman, who is dozing on the same bench from which he had chased the thief. The officer runs to the distraught woman, feigns interest in her plight, but returns to the bench to resume his nap.

Fatty and Mabel meanwhile are playing hide-and-seek along the park's lakeside and battling a bee that has landed on Mabel's nose. Not far away, the thief admires the pilfered watch and then puts it in his trousers' pocket, which apparently has a hole, for the watch exits the cuff of his trousers and drops to the ground. The crook ambles away, unaware of the loss of his ill-gotten gain. Fatty soon finds the watch while Mabel is close by playfully splashing lake water. When she returns, he presents the watch as a gift he had bought for her. Elated, Mabel does not recognize the watch even though Fatty pins it to the lapel of her dress using a small piece of Mama's ribbon still attached to the timepiece's top metal loop or "bow".

While Fatty leaves to buy sweets at a concession stand, the passing thief notices Mabel wearing "his" watch after realizing he had lost it. A struggle for the watch ensues. Fatty hears the ruckus and rushes to Mabel's aid as Mama also arrives and sees her stolen property. Fatty and the thief frantically pass the watch back and forth to one another, each man disavowing any connection to it. Mama then reclaims the watch, recognizes the thief, and calls again for help. The snoozing officer, who was awakened by his angry police chief, finally appears. The crook flees, but the cop finds him hiding between two large rocks. He cracks him on the head with his nightstick and carries the unconscious thief off to jail. The film ends with Fatty putting his arms around Mama and Mabel and all three happily walking away together.

== Cast ==
- Mabel Normand as Mabel
- Roscoe "Fatty" Arbuckle as Fatty
- Alice Davenport as Mabel's mother
- Joe Bordeaux as Thief
- Edgar Kennedy as Cop
- Glen Cavender as Pedestrian in park
- Ted Edwards as Man on bench
- Billy Gilbert as Police chief

== Production and cast notes ==
- Directed by Mabel Normand, Wished on Mabel is one of no less than a staggering 188 shorts in which Normand performed from the beginning of 1911 through 1915. This breakneck pace in production amounted to her working in shorts that were generally organized, quickly rehearsed, filmed, and edited on an average of one every 10 days for five straight years.
- Wished on Mabel is among three one-reel shorts that Mabel Normand and Roscoe Arbuckle made with other Keystone cast and crew while on location in San Francisco and the Bay Area between March 25 and April 18, 1915. In addition to filming Wished on Mabel, Keystone personnel shot footage for Mabel and Fatty Viewing the World's Fair at San Francisco and for Mabel's Wilful Way, the latter being filmed in Oakland, across the bay from San Francisco.
- Several early features of Golden Gate Park can be seen in Wished on Mabel. One prominent structure in the film is Stone Bridge (or Rustic Bridge), which connects the park's south-side mainland to Strawberry Hill, an island in Stow Lake. The original bridge, completed in 1893, was partially reconstructed after it was damaged by a massive earthquake that struck San Francisco in 1906, just nine years prior to the filming of Wished on Mabel.

== See also ==
- Fatty Arbuckle filmography
