= Up a Tree =

Up a Tree may refer to:

- Up a Tree (1930 film), an American comedy film
- Up a Tree (1955 film), a Disney animated short film
- Up a Tree (album), a 1999 album by Looper
- "Up a Tree" (Adventure Time), a 2012 TV episode
- "Up a Tree" (Dynasty), a 2020 TV episode
- "Up a Tree!", a 2012 TV episode of Best of Luck Nikki (an Indian adaptation of Good Luck Charlie)
- "Up a Tree", a cartoon short from the 1965–1966 TV series The New 3 Stooges
