= Their Social Splash =

1915 film

- Directed by: Charles Avery; Arvid E. Gillstrom
- Produced by: Mack Sennett
- Starring: Slim Summerville
- Music by: Richard Heuberger
- Release date: April 26, 1915
- Running time: 10 minutes
- Country: United States
- Languages: Silent; English intertitles

Their Social Splash is a 1915 short comedy film featuring Harold Lloyd. A print of Their Social Splash exists.

== Cast ==
- Slim Summerville - Harold
- Dixie Chene - Gladys
- Charles Murray - Hogan
- Polly Moran - Polly
- Frank Hayes - The Father
- Harold Lloyd - The Minister
- Harry Gribbon
- Mabel Normand - (unconfirmed)
- Ben Turpin - (unconfirmed)

== See also ==
- Harold Lloyd filmography
