= Betty Schade =

American actress

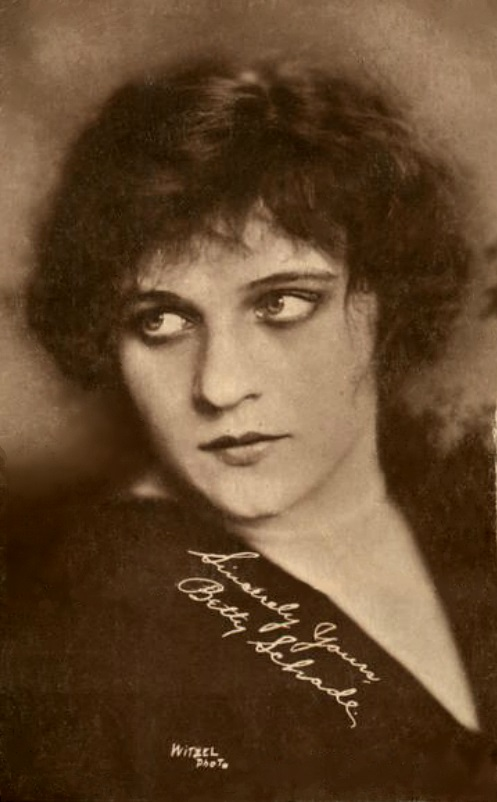
- Schade c. 1918
- Born: Frida Feddersen; March 27, 1895; Geestemünde, Germany
- Died: March 27, 1982 (aged 87); Los Angeles, California USA
- Years active: 1913–1921
- Spouse(s): Fritz Schade; Ernest Shields

Betty Schade (born Frida Feddersen; March 27, 1895 – March 27, 1982) was a German-born American actress of the silent era. She appeared in about 135 films between 1913 and 1921.

Schade was born in Geestemünde (Bremerhaven), Germany and married first to actor Fritz Schade. The couple traveled to California in 1912-1913 and joined the original Mack Sennett stock company. Later the two were signed to contracts with Carl Laemmle's Universal Pictures. In 1917, she wed actor Ernest Shields and was contracted to Universal Pictures.

She died in Los Angeles, California in on March 27, 1982.

== Selected filmography ==
- His Chum the Baron (1913)
- Passions, He Had Three (1913)
- Lights and Shadows (1914)
- The Opened Shutters (1914)
- After Five (1915)
- The Dumb Girl of Portici (1916)
- The Love Girl (1916)
- The Edge of the Law (1917)
- Fighting Mad (1917)
- The Reward of the Faithless (1917)
- The Bronze Bride (1917)
- The Scarlet Crystal (1917)
- The Scarlet Drop (1918)
- The Guilt of Silence (1918)
- Nobody's Wife (1918)
- A Woman's Fool (1918)
- The Wolf and His Mate (1918)
- Painted Lips (1918)
- Winner Takes All (1918)
- Happiness a la Mode (1919)
- A Fight for Love (1919)
- Spotlight Sadie (1919)
- Bare Fists (1919)
- Riders of Vengeance (1919)
- Through the Wrong Door (1919)
- Deliverance (1919)
- The Soul of Youth (1920)
- Darling Mine (1920)
- Flame of Youth (1920)
- Wing Toy (1921)
- The Foolish Matrons (1921)
- Voices of the City (1921)
- Everything for Sale (1921)
- First Love (1921)
