= Two Old Tars =

1913 film

- Directed by: Henry Lehrman
- Starring: Fatty Arbuckle
- Release date: October 20, 1913
- Country: United States
- Languages: Silent; English intertitles

Two Old Tars is a 1913 American short comedy film featuring Fatty Arbuckle.

== Cast ==
The cast included:

- Roscoe "Fatty" Arbuckle
- Nick Cogley

== See also ==
- List of American films of 1913
- Roscoe Arbuckle filmography
