= The Wolf and His Mate =

- Directed by: Edward LeSaint
- Written by: Julia Maier; Doris Schroeder
- Starring: Louise Lovely; Jack Hoxie; Betty Schade
- Production company: Universal Pictures
- Distributed by: Universal Pictures
- Release date: January 7, 1918
- Running time: 50 minutes
- Country: United States
- Languages: Silent; English intertitles

The Wolf and His Mate is a 1918 American silent adventure film directed by Edward LeSaint and starring Louise Lovely, Jack Hoxie and Betty Schade.

== Cast ==
- Louise Lovely as Bess Nolan
- Jack Hoxie as Donald Bayne, 'The Wolf'
- George Odell as Steve Nolan
- Betty Schade as Vida Burns
- Georgia French as Rose Nolan
- Hector Dion as 'Snaky' Burns

== Bibliography ==
- Rainey, Buck. Sweethearts of the Sage: Biographies and Filmographies of 258 actresses appearing in Western movies. McFarland & Company, 1992.
