= The Scarlet Crystal =

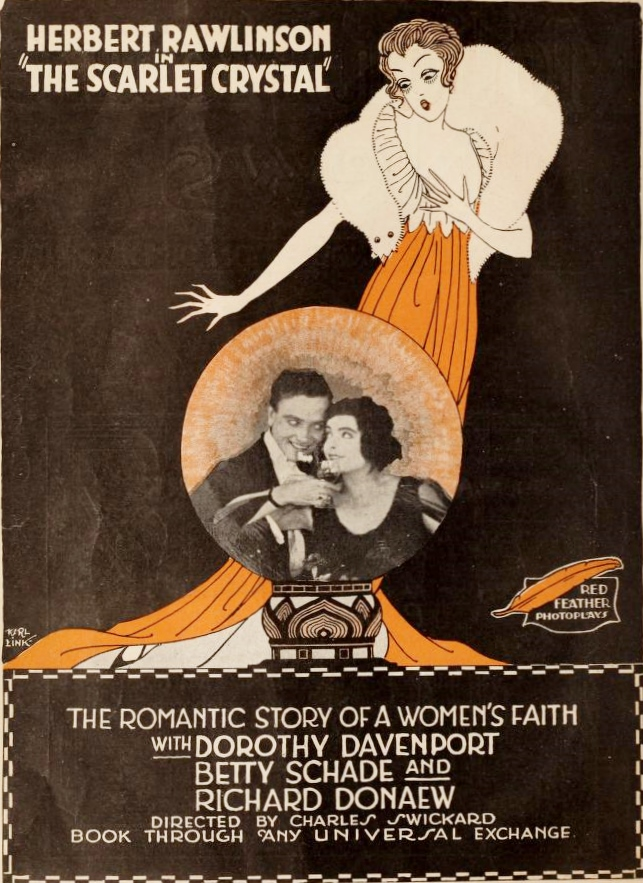
- Directed by: Charles Swickard
- Written by: J. Grubb Alexander
- Starring: Herbert Rawlinson; Betty Schade; Dorothy Davenport
- Cinematography: Harry McGuire Stanley
- Production company: Universal Pictures
- Distributed by: Universal Pictures
- Release date: March 19, 1917
- Running time: 50 minutes
- Country: United States
- Language: Silent (English intertitles)

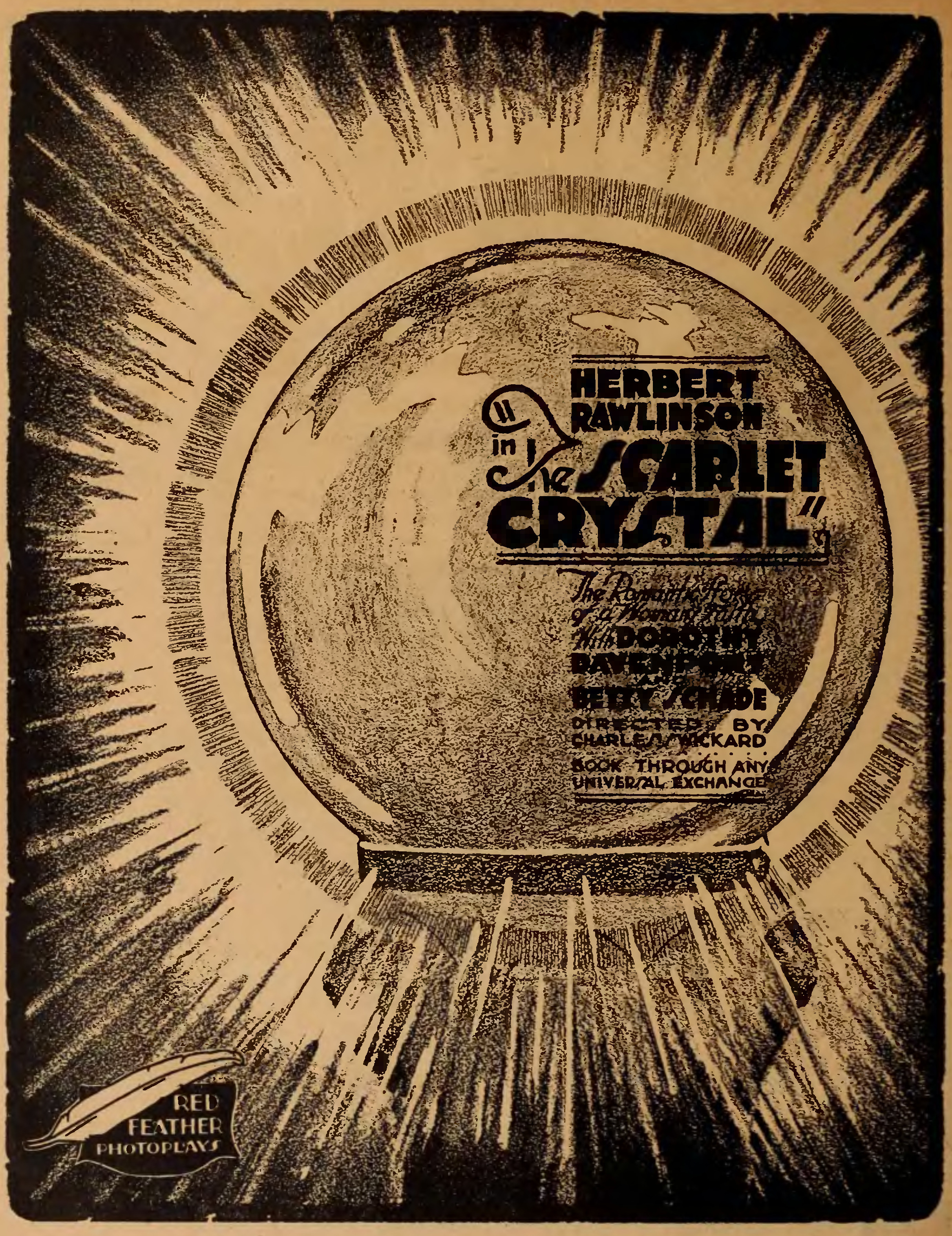
"The Scarlet Crystal" movie ad from, Moving Picture Weekly, 1917

The Scarlet Crystal is a 1917 American silent crime drama film directed by Charles Swickard and starring Herbert Rawlinson, Betty Schade, and Dorothy Davenport.

== Cast ==
- Herbert Rawlinson as Vincent Morgan
- Betty Schade as Priscilla Worth
- Dorothy Davenport as Marie Delys
- Raymond Whitaker as Maxfield Durant
- Marie Hazelton as Peggy Lovel
- Gertrude Astor as Helen Forbes
- Dick Ryan as Billy Van Duyn
- Edith Johnson
- Nicholas Dunaew

== Bibliography ==
- James Robert Parish & Michael R. Pitts. Film directors: a Guide to their American films. Scarecrow Press, 1974.
