= A Rural Demon =

1914 film

- Directed by: Henry Lehrman; Mack Sennett
- Produced by: Mack Sennett
- Starring: Fatty Arbuckle
- Release date: March 19, 1914
- Country: United States
- Languages: Silent; English intertitles

A Rural Demon is a 1914 American short comedy film featuring Roscoe "Fatty" Arbuckle. Directed by Henry Lehrman and Mack Sennett, it was originally released on March 19, 1914. It was a Keystone Film Company production.

== Cast ==
- Roscoe "Fatty" Arbuckle
- Eva Nelson

== Reception ==
A 1914 review in the Folkestone Herald in England praised Arbuckle's "splendid impersonation of thedemon" and noted that the film "caused roars of laughter".

== See also ==
- List of American films of 1914
- Fatty Arbuckle filmography
