= Mrs. Jones' Birthday =

1909 film

- Produced by: William Nicholas Selig
- Starring: Fatty Arbuckle
- Release date: August 30, 1909
- Country: United States
- Language: Silent with English intertitles

Mrs. Jones' Birthday is a 1909 short American comedy film featuring Fatty Arbuckle. It was Arbuckle's second onscreen performance.

== Cast ==
- Roscoe Arbuckle

== See also ==
- List of American films of 1909
- Fatty Arbuckle filmography
