= Frank Hayes (actor) =

American actor

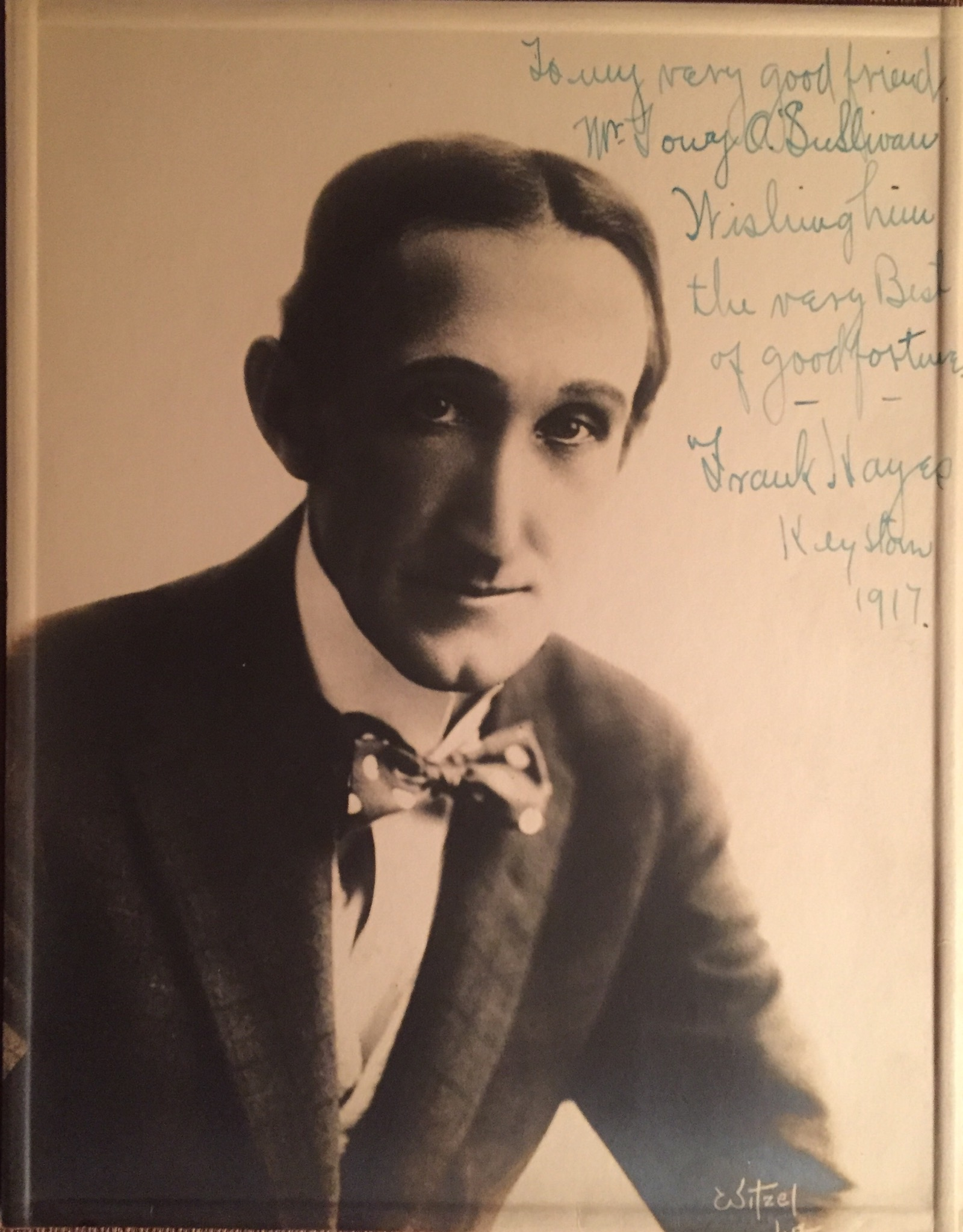
- Hayes at Keystone (1917)
- Born: Frank Rowell Hayes; May 17, 1871; San Francisco, California, US
- Died: December 28, 1923 (aged 52); Hollywood, California, US
- Occupation: Actor
- Years active: 1913–1923

Frank Hayes (May 17, 1871 – December 28, 1923) was an American film actor of the silent era. He appeared in more than 70 films between 1913 and 1924. An actor with a unique hatchet face appearance he appeared mostly in comedies. His facial appearance naturally lent to comedic effect in silent films — in particular when he would leave out his dentures — but he also showed up in sentimental farces such as A Hoosier Romance (1918), an early film starring Colleen Moore. In his last appearance, even though brief in the theatrical cut, he played "Old Grannis" in the tragedy Greed.

He died in Hollywood, California from pneumonia, aged 52.

== Selected filmography ==
- Fatty and Minnie He-Haw (1914)
- Fatty's Jonah Day (1914)
- His Musical Career (1914)
- Lover's Luck (1914)
- Leading Lizzie Astray (1914)
- Rum and Wall Paper (1915)
- Fatty's Tintype Tangle (1915)
- The Little Teacher (1915)
- Their Social Splash (1915)
- When Love Took Wings (1915)
- That Little Band of Gold (1915)
- Fatty's Faithful Fido (1915)
- Fatty's Chance Acquaintance (1915)
- Fatty's Reckless Fling (1915)
- Hogan's Romance Upset (1915)
- Fatty's New Role (1915)
- Fatty and Mabel at the San Diego Exposition (1915)
- Mabel, Fatty and the Law (1915)
- Fatty and Mabel Adrift (1916)
- When Do We Eat? (1918)
- The Yellow Dog (1918)
- After His Own Heart (1919)
- Cupid Forecloses (1919)
- Love (1919)
- The Simple Life (1919)
- The Stage Hand (1920)
- My Boy (1921)
- The Man of the Forest (1921)
- The Killer (1921)
- When Romance Rides (1922)
- Heart's Haven (1922)
- The Gown Shop (1923)
- Double Dealing (1923)
- The Barnyard (1923)
- Greed (1924)
