= Lloyd Hamilton =

American actor and comedian (1891–1935)

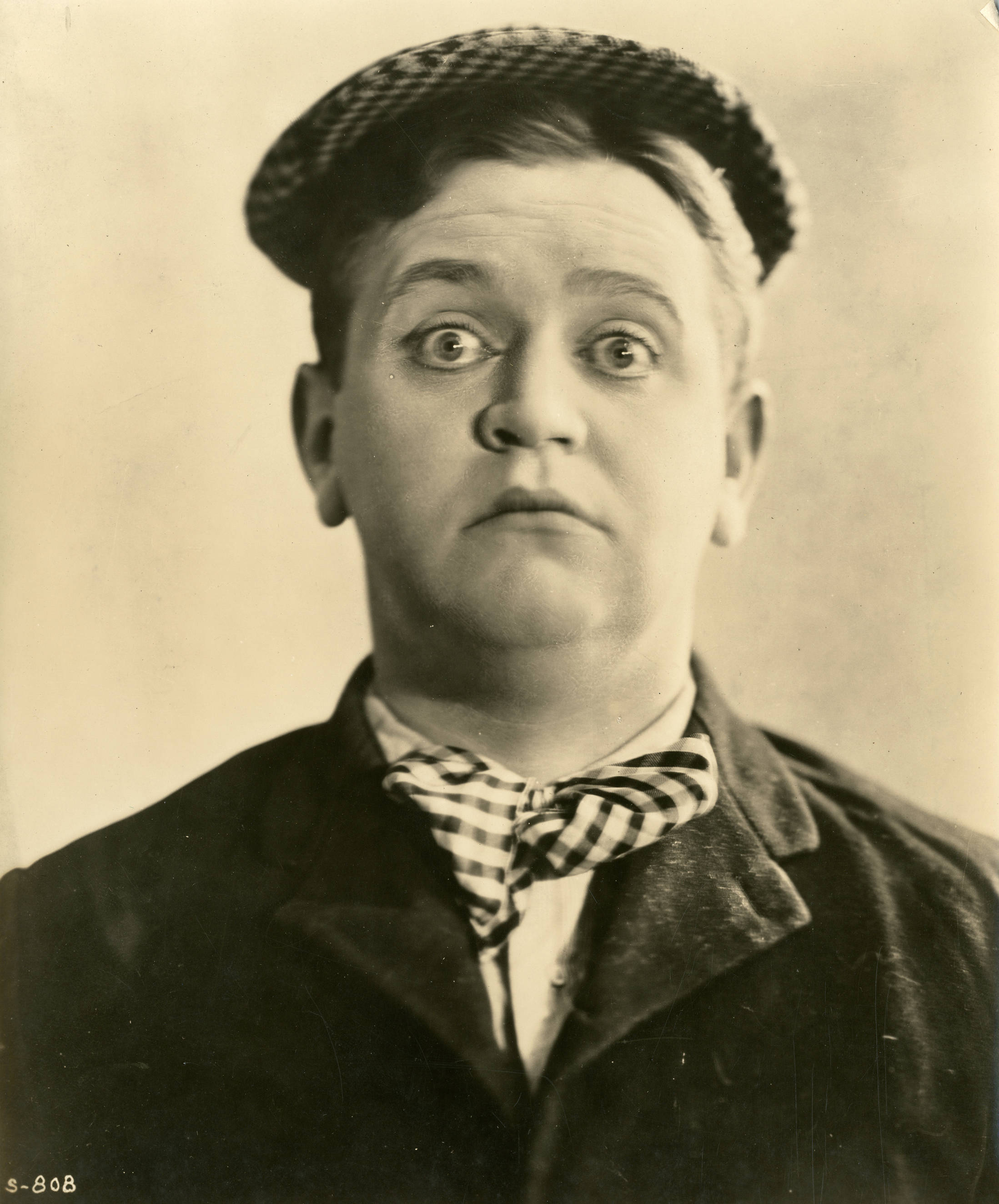
- Hamilton in 1922
- Born: Lloyd Vernon Hamilton; August 19, 1891; Oakland, California, U.S.
- Died: January 19, 1935 (aged 43); Hollywood, California, U.S.
- Resting place: Vandalia Cemetery, Porterville, Tulare County, California
- Occupation: Actor
- Years active: 1913–1934
- Spouse: Ethel Lloyd (m. 1913; div. 1926) Irene Dalton (m. 1927; div. 1928)

Lloyd Vernon Hamilton (August 19, 1891 – January 19, 1935) was an American film comedian, best remembered for his work in the silent era.

== Career ==
Lloyd Vernon Hamilton in 1922.

Having begun his career as an extra in theatre-productions, Hamilton first appeared on film in 1913, doing various uncredited roles in one-reel comedies. A year later, in 1914, he teamed up with comedian Bud Duncan, and for the next three years the two performers appeared as comedy team Ham and Bud in numerous one-reelers produced by the Kalem Company. Hamilton and Duncan split up in 1917, Hamilton joining Fox as a solo performer. During the next few years he developed a distinct comic persona, appearing as a slightly prissy, overgrown boy often wearing a checkered cap.

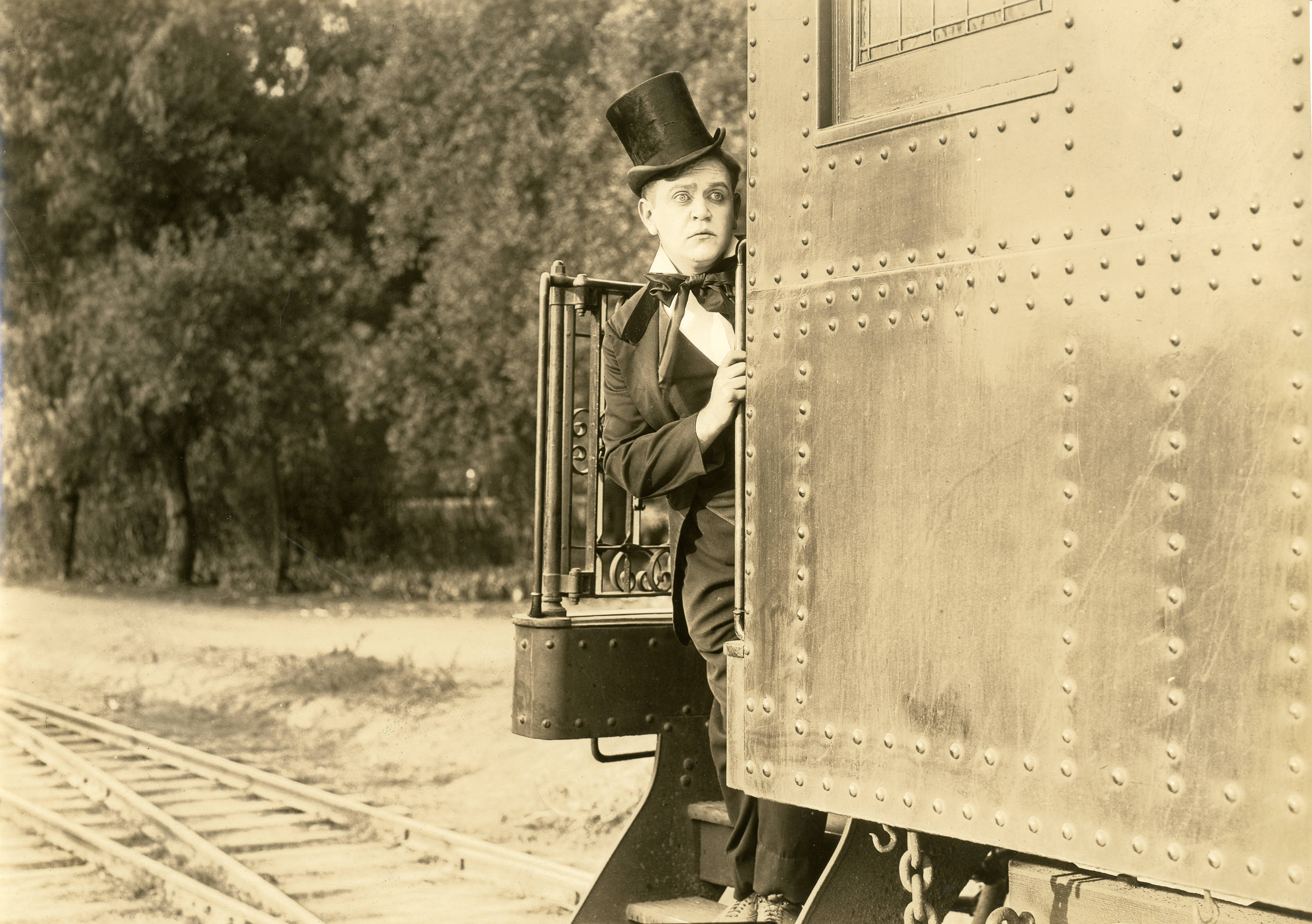
Hamilton in the American comedy short film The Rainmaker (1922).

By the early 1920s, Hamilton was considered a major star of short comedies. His skills were admired by his fellow comedians, thus contributing to his reputation as a comedian's comedian; according to Oscar Levant, Charlie Chaplin singled him out as the one actor of whom he was jealous. Buster Keaton in an interview praised him as "one of the funniest men in pictures," while Charley Chase, who early in his career had directed Hamilton in a number of short subjects, stated that he would often ask himself "how would 'Ham' Hamilton play this?" before shooting a scene. His films often have surreal touches: in The Movies he tearfully bids goodbye to his mother to go to the city, turns his back on the family farm, and steps directly into the city which is right next door. In Move Along he neatly lays his trousers in the street, to have a steamroller press them.

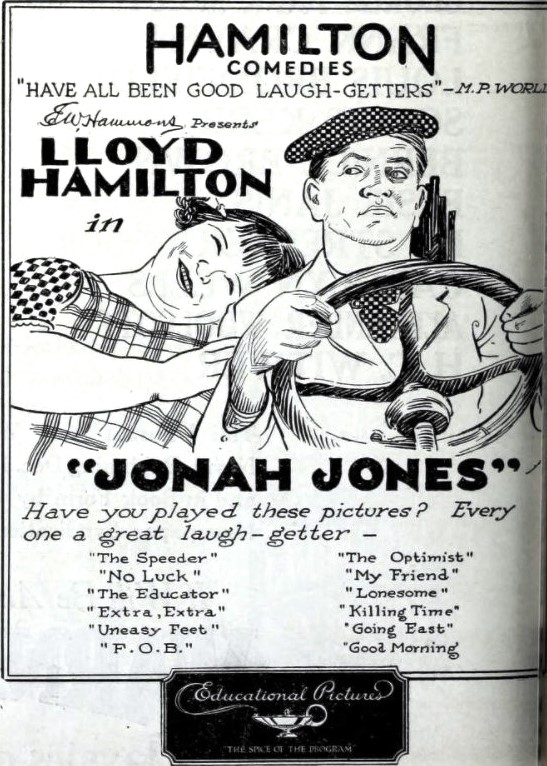
Poster for the American comedy short film Jonah Jones (1924) with Lloyd Hamilton and Babe London.

By 1924, Hamilton had become popular enough that it was decided he should do the transition to feature-length comedies. The five-reel comedy which resulted, His Darker Self (1924), was a flop both with critics and audiences, and Hamilton hastily returned to making two-reelers. After the failure of his first feature-length film, coupled with an increasing alcohol addiction, Hamilton is reported to have become more indifferent to his career, and his films from the later silent era are often considered more uneven in quality than his work in the early 1920s.

In 1927, Hamilton was in a speakeasy when a boxer was murdered (Hamilton was not a suspect), and after the incident the motion picture authorities banned him from pictures for over a year. By 1929 he was back on screen in talking pictures (his speaking voice being a nasal tenor that fit his finicky screen character) but his continued drinking affected his health. Hamilton's last starring series was a string of two-reel comedies produced by Mack Sennett. He continued to play the hapless victim of circumstance, as in Too Many Highballs where Hamilton tries to park his car and keeps getting boxed in by motorists. When the Sennett series lapsed, there was talk of Hamilton joining the Hal Roach studio, but Roach knew of Hamilton's notorious alcohol abuse and declined to hire him. Hamilton's facial features had acquired deep lines and hollows from heavy drinking, and he no longer looked like the "overgrown boy" in his final films.

Relatively few of Hamilton's silent films from the 1920s survive; they were produced by Educational Pictures, which suffered a laboratory fire in 1937. Those of Hamilton's films that do exist are often prized by comedy collectors and silent-film enthusiasts.

== Personal life ==
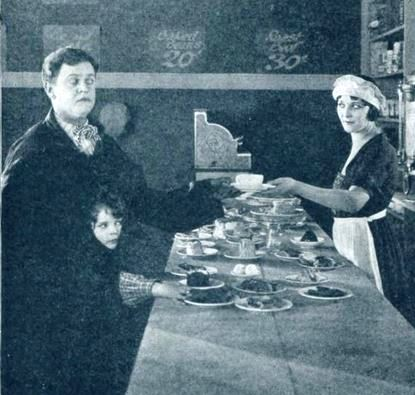
Lloyd Hamilton, Irene Dalton, and child actor Robert DeVilbiss in Rolling Stones (1922)

Hamilton was married twice. He married Ethel Lloyd Hamilton in May 1913; the couple had become estranged by the early 1920s, and divorced in 1926. The year after, in June 1927, he married Irene Dalton, an actress who had appeared as his leading lady in several two-reelers. The marriage to Dalton quickly became troubled, however, and they were divorced by 1928. Hamilton had no children.

During the 1920s, Hamilton became a heavy drinker, and it has long been claimed that he would often turn rather violent when intoxicated. However, in Anthony Balducci's biography of Hamilton (McFarland & Company, 2009) the author argues that there exists no specific evidence anywhere of Hamilton having been physically violent. According to director Charles Lamont, who knew Hamilton personally for several years, Hamilton was "a friendly and amiable fellow; unfortunately, he overindulged in his drinking."

Hamilton died in January 1935, during an operation for what was described as "stomach troubles."

== Legacy ==
Herbert Sydney Foxwell created a celebrity comic about Hamilton for the magazine Kinema Comic in 1920.

Hamilton was honored with a "star" on the Hollywood Walk of Fame, located at 6161 Hollywood Boulevard.

== Partial filmography ==
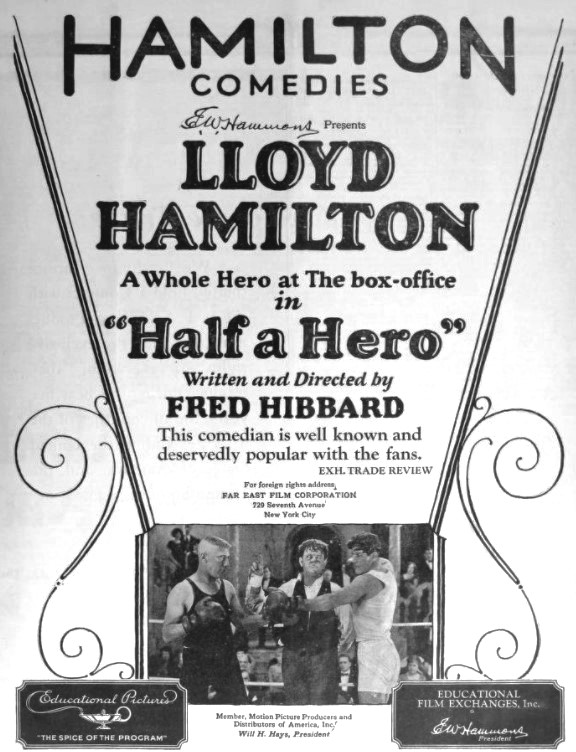
Advertisement for the American comedy short film Half a Hero (1925) with Lloyd Hamilton.

- Colonel Custard's Last Stand (1914)
- The Deadly Battle at Hicksville (1914)
- A Whirlwind of Whiskers (1917)
- "The Simp" (1920)
- "Moonshine" (1920)
- A Self-Made Failure (1924)
- His Darker Self (1924)
- Hello, 'Frisco (1924)
- The Movies (1925)
- One Sunday Morning (1926)
- Peaceful Oscar (1927)
- Breezing Along (1927)
- Don't Be Nervous (1929)
- The Show of Shows (1929)
- Won by a Neck (1930)
- Up a Tree (1930)
- Marriage Rows (1931)
- Ex-Plumber (1931)
- Are You There? (1931)
- Too Many Highballs (1933)
- Star Night at the Cocoanut Grove (1934)
