= Joe Bordeaux =

American actor (1886–1950)

- Born: March 9, 1886; Pueblo, Colorado
- Died: September 10, 1950 (aged 64); Los Angeles, California
- Occupation: Actor
- Years active: 1914–1940

Joe Bordeaux (March 9, 1886 – September 10, 1950) was an American film actor. He appeared in more than 70 films between 1914 and 1940.

In the early 1910s Bordeaux appeared in a number of Fatty Arbuckle pictures, including Mable and Fatty's Simple Life, Fatty's New Role, Fatty's Plucky Pup, Fatty's Faithful Fido, and Fatty's Tintype Tangle.

He was born in Pueblo, Colorado, and died in Los Angeles, California.

== Selected filmography ==
- Mabel at the Wheel (1914, Short) - Dubious Character
- The Knockout (1914, Short) - Policeman (uncredited)
- The Property Man (1914, Short) - Old Actor
- Mabel and Fatty's Wash Day (1915, Short) - Cop (uncredited)
- Mabel and Fatty's Married Life (1915, Short) - Farm Hand
- Mabel and Fatty's Simple Life (1915, Short) - Farm Hand
- Fatty and Mabel at the San Diego Exposition (1915, Short) - Flirty Guy in Go-Cart (uncredited)
- Mabel, Fatty and the Law (1915, Short) - Cop in Park (uncredited)
- Fatty's New Role (1915, Short) - Cop (uncredited)
- Fatty's Faithful Fido (1915, Short) - Man at the Dance (uncredited)
- When Love Took Wings (1915, Short) - Fatty's Rival - the Girl's True Love
- Wished on Mabel (1915, Short) - Thief
- Mabel's Wilful Way (1915, Short) - Cop (uncredited)
- Miss Fatty's Seaside Lovers (1915, Short) - Short Suitor
- Fatty's Plucky Pup (1915, Short) - Shell Game Accomplice
- Fatty's Tintype Tangle (1915, Short) - Passerby with Banana / Driver / Cop (uncredited)
- Fatty and Mabel Adrift (1916, Short) - Landem's Chauffeur / 2nd Robber (uncredited)
- Bright Lights (1916, Short) - Man Used as Battering Ram by Fatty (uncredited)
- His Wife's Mistakes (1916, Short) - The Waiter
- The Other Man (1916, Short) - Another Tramp (uncredited)
- The Moonshiners (1916, Short) - The Moonshiner
- The Waiters' Ball (1916, Short) - The Cashier's Brother
- The Butcher Boy (1917, Short) - Accomplice
- Coney Island (1917, Short) - Sledgehammer Man / Cop (uncredited)
- The Slave (1917, Short)
- A Reckless Romeo (1917, Short)
- His Day Out (1918, Short)
- The Rogue (1918, Short)
- The Orderly (1918, Short)
- The Scholar (1918, Short)
- The Messenger (1918, Short)
- The Handy Man (1918, Short)
- Moonshine (1918, Short)
- Good Night, Nurse! (1918, Short)
- Mickey (1918) - Stage Driver (uncredited)
- The White Sheep (1924)
- Old Clothes (1925)
- The First Auto (1927) - Livery Handler at Auction (uncredited)
- The Matinee Idol (1928) - Auditioning Actor (uncredited)
- Golf Widows (1928)
- Steamboat Bill, Jr. (1928) - Ship's Officer on the King who fights with Keaton (uncredited)
- Submarine (1928)
- The Power of the Press (1928) - Newspaper Employee (uncredited)
- The Sideshow (1928) - Roustabout (uncredited)
- The Younger Generation (1929) - Crook (uncredited)
- Spite Marriage (1929) - Rumrunner (uncredited)
- Flight (1929) - Marine (uncredited)
- Hurricane (1929) - Pete
- The Man Hunter (1930) - Dennis
- Dancing Sweeties (1930) - Dance Hall Customer (uncredited)
- The Doorway to Hell (1930) - Joe - a Gangster (uncredited)
- High Speed (1932) - Tony Orlando
- The Dentist (1932, Short) - Benford's Caddy (uncredited)
- Hypnotized (1932) - Seaman (uncredited)
- Frisco Jenny (1932) - Drunken Sailor (uncredited)
- Lady for a Day (1933) - Reception Guest (uncredited)
- Broadway Bill (1934) - (uncredited)
- Murder in the Clouds (1934) - Carson (uncredited)
- Miss Pacific Fleet (1935) - Kidnapper Piloting Speedboat (uncredited)
- Hell-Ship Morgan (1936) - Bartender (uncredited)
- Pride of the Marines (1936) - Marine (uncredited)
- Mr. Deeds Goes to Town (1936) - Minor Role (uncredited)
- Panic on the Air (1936) - Taxi Driver (uncredited)
- Our Relations (1936) - Grubby Wharf Tough (uncredited)
- A Dangerous Adventure (1937) - Workman (uncredited)
- You Can't Take It with You (1938) - Taxi Driver (uncredited)
- The Story of Vernon and Irene Castle (1939) - Minor Role (uncredited)
- The Grapes of Wrath (1940) - Migrant (uncredited)
- I Take This Woman (1940) - Man in Clinic (uncredited)
- Men Against the Sky (1940) - Mechanic (uncredited)
- The Great Dictator (1940) - Ghetto Extra (uncredited)
