= Fatty's Chance Acquaintance =

1915 film

- Full film with Dutch intertitles
- Directed by: Fatty Arbuckle
- Produced by: Mack Sennett
- Starring: Fatty Arbuckle
- Production company: Keystone Studios
- Distributed by: Mutual Film
- Release date: March 8, 1915
- Running time: 13 minutes
- Country: United States
- Languages: Silent; English intertitles

Fatty's Chance Acquaintance is a 1915 American short comedy film directed by and starring Fatty Arbuckle.

== Plot summary ==
Fatty and his wife enjoy some time in the park. After his wife refuses to buy his soft drink, chaos ensues.

== Cast ==
- Roscoe "Fatty" Arbuckle as Fatty
- Billie Bennett as Fatty's wife
- Harry McCoy as Pickpocket
- Minta Durfee as Pickpocket's girlfriend
- Frank Hayes as Cop
- Glen Cavender as Man in park
- Ted Edwards as Ice Cream Vendor

== See also ==
- Fatty Arbuckle filmography
