= One Sunday Morning =

1926 film

- Directed by: Fatty Arbuckle
- Starring: Lloyd Hamilton
- Release date: December 12, 1926
- Running time: 25 minutes
- Country: United States
- Languages: Silent; English intertitles

One Sunday Morning is a 1926 American comedy film directed by Fatty Arbuckle.

== Cast ==
- Lloyd Hamilton
- Estelle Bradley
- Stanley Blystone

== See also ==
- Roscoe Arbuckle filmography
