= When Love Took Wings =

1915 film

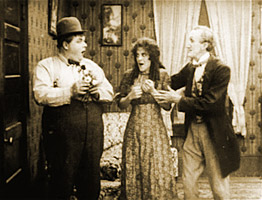
- Still from the film
- Directed by: Fatty Arbuckle
- Starring: Fatty Arbuckle
- Production company: Keystone Studios
- Distributed by: Mutual Film
- Release date: April 1, 1915
- Running time: 13 minutes
- Country: United States
- Languages: Silent; English intertitles

When Love Took Wings is a 1915 short comedy film directed by and starring Fatty Arbuckle. The film is extant.

== Cast ==
- Roscoe "Fatty" Arbuckle as Reckless Fatty
- Helen Carlyle as The Girl
- Frank Hayes as The Girl's Father
- Joe Bordeaux as Fatty's rival
- Al St. John as Hank Perkins, another rival
- Ted Edwards as Minister (uncredited)

== See also ==
- Fatty Arbuckle filmography
