= Help! Help! Hydrophobia! =

1913 film

- Directed by: Henry Lehrman
- Produced by: Mack Sennett
- Starring: Fatty Arbuckle
- Release date: March 3, 1913
- Country: United States
- Languages: Silent; English intertitles

Help! Help! Hydrophobia! is a 1913 American short comedy film starring Fatty Arbuckle.

The film is also known as The Chemist.

== Plot ==
The Professor resents Jim Brown courting his daughter. Jim accidentally feeds the dog a milk culture the Professor has been experimenting on, and the Professor believes that the dog is infected with deadly germs. Everyone runs away from the dog.

== Cast ==
The cast includes:

- Roscoe "Fatty" Arbuckle: Jim Brown
- Beatrice Van: Professor's Daughter
- Nick Cogley: Professor

== Reception ==
The film was said to be "exceedingly funny".

== See also ==
- List of American films of 1913
- Fatty Arbuckle filmography
