= The Pullman Porter =

1919 film

- Directed by: Fatty Arbuckle
- Written by: Fatty Arbuckle
- Starring: Fatty Arbuckle
- Release date: February 16, 1919
- Country: United States
- Languages: Silent; English intertitles

The Pullman Porter is a 1919 American short comedy film directed by and starring Fatty Arbuckle. The film is considered to be lost.

== Cast ==
- Roscoe "Fatty" Arbuckle
- Al St. John

== See also ==
- Fatty Arbuckle filmography
