= Ex-Plumber =

1931 film

- Directed by: Fatty Arbuckle
- Written by: Fatty Arbuckle; Walter F. Reed
- Starring: Lloyd Hamilton
- Distributed by: Educational Pictures
- Release date: March 8, 1931
- Running time: 21 minutes
- Country: United States
- Language: English

Ex-Plumber is a 1931 comedy film directed by Fatty Arbuckle.

== Plot Summary ==
A newlywed woman's ex-boyfriend, a Russian Grand Duke, comes to visit. Her husband is a jealous man, and her ex wants her back. Trying to keep the two from meeting, she enlists a plumber to play her husband. Shenanigans follow.

== Cast ==
- Lloyd Hamilton — Elmer Swift/Plumber
- Addie McPhail — Addie, The Wife
- Stanley Blystone — Addie's Husband
- Mitchell Lewis — The Russian Duke
- Amber Norman — Helen Swift
- Polly Christy — Marie

== See also ==
- List of American films of 1931
- Fatty Arbuckle filmography
