= Art Trouble =

1934 film by Ralph Staub

- Directed by: Ralph Staub
- Written by: Jack Henley; Dolph Singer
- Starring: Harry Gribbon; Shemp Howard; James Stewart (uncredited)
- Distributed by: Warner Bros.
- Release date: June 23, 1934
- Running time: 21 minutes
- Country: United States
- Language: English

Art Trouble is a 1934 American pre-Code comedy short directed by Ralph Staub and starring Harry Gribbon and Shemp Howard. The film is notable for featuring an uncredited James Stewart in his first screen role.

Gribbon was one of several comedy team partners with whom Shemp Howard worked. Howard had been an original member of the Three Stooges and brother of Stooges Curly Howard and Moe Howard. Shemp began making his own shorts prior to having to return to the Stooges in the wake of Curly's strokes in the mid-1940s.

== Plot ==
Two brothers are ordered by their parents to go to Paris to study art. Having other interests, they pay two house painters to go in their place. When the impostors win an art contest, they are exposed by an unexpected visitor.

== Cast ==
- Harry Gribbon ... Art Student
- Shemp Howard ... Art Student
- Beatrice Blinn ... Girl at nightclub
- Leni Stengel ... Girl at nightclub
- Hope Landin ... Martha "Mater" Burton, the Burton boys' mother (uncredited)
- Marjorie Main ... Woman Who Sits on Painting (uncredited)
- James Stewart ... Jack Burton (uncredited)
- Don Tomkins ... Joe Burton (uncredited)
- Gayne Whitman ... Richard "Pater" Burton, the Burton boys' father (uncredited)
