= Fatty and Mabel's Simple Life =

1915 film

- Roscoe Arbuckle, Ted Edwards and Mabel Normand in Fatty and Mabel's Simple Life
- Directed by: Fatty Arbuckle
- Produced by: Mack Sennett
- Starring: Fatty Arbuckle
- Distributed by: Keystone Studios
- Release date: January 18, 1915
- Running time: 24 minutes
- Country: United States
- Language: Silent (English intertitles)

Full film

Fatty and Mabel's Simple Life is a 1915 American short silent comedy film directed by and starring Fatty Arbuckle.

== Cast ==
- Roscoe "Fatty" Arbuckle as Roscoe
- Mabel Normand as Mabel
- Al St. John as The Squire's son
- Josef Swickard as Mabel's father
- Joe Bordeaux as Farm hand
- Ted Edwards as Minister (uncredited)

== See also ==
- Roscoe Arbuckle filmography
