= Virginia Kirtley =

American actress (1888–1956)

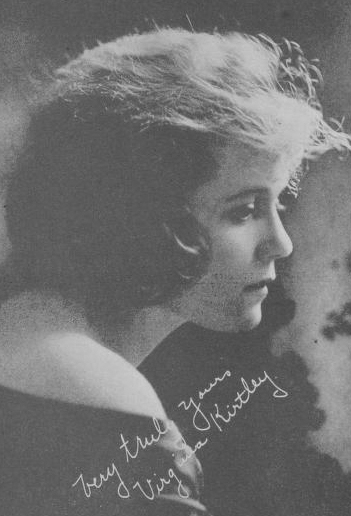
- Virginia Kirtley
- Born: Virginia M. Saffell; November 11, 1888; Bowling Green, Missouri, United States
- Died: August 19, 1956 (aged 67); Sherman Oaks, California, United States
- Occupations: Actress, screenwriter
- Years active: 1913-1928
- Spouse(s): Eddie Lyons (1916-1926, his death); Eddie Fetherston (1927 - ?)
- Children: 1

Virginia Kirtley (born Virginia M. Saffell; November 11, 1888 – August 19, 1956) was an American film actress and writer during the silent era. She appeared in more than 50 films in the 1910s and 1920s.

Kirtley was born Virginia M. Saffell in Bowling Green, Missouri, but went on to live with her family in Colorado Springs, Colorado. She took her screen surname from her mother's maiden name. At age 10 she performed with the Burbank Stock Company of Los Angeles, and she acted in other productions before she made the transition to film. She attended school in Colorado at Cutler Academy and Colorado College.

While employed by Keystone Studios, Kirtley appeared in two Charlie Chaplin short comedies in 1914: Making a Living (Chaplin's first film) and A Film Johnnie.

Kirtley married actor Eddie Lyons in 1916, and they had a daughter, Frances Lyons, who was an actress. After Lyons's death, Kirtley married actor Eddie Fetherston in 1927. Kirtley died on August 19, 1956, in Los Angeles and was buried in Calvary Cemetery in East Los Angeles.

== Selected filmography ==
As an actress:

- Mabel's New Hero (1913)
- Mabel's Dramatic Career (1913)
- A Flirt's Mistake (1914)
- Making a Living (1914)
- A Film Johnnie (1914)
- Who Shall Take My Life? (1917)
- The Midnight Adventure (1928)

As a writer:

- The Nightcap (1917) (short)
- To Be or Not to Be Married (1917) (short)
- A Million in Sight (1917) (short)
- Two Small-Town Romeos (1916) (short)
- The Barfly (1916) (short)
- With the Spirit's Help (1916) (short)
