= Zip, the Dodger =

1914 film

- Directed by: Fatty Arbuckle
- Starring: Fatty Arbuckle
- Release date: October 7, 1914
- Country: United States
- Languages: Silent; English intertitles

Zip, the Dodger is a 1914 short comedy film directed by and starring Fatty Arbuckle.

== Cast ==
- Roscoe "Fatty" Arbuckle

== See also ==
- Fatty Arbuckle filmography
