= Fatty's New Role =

1915 film

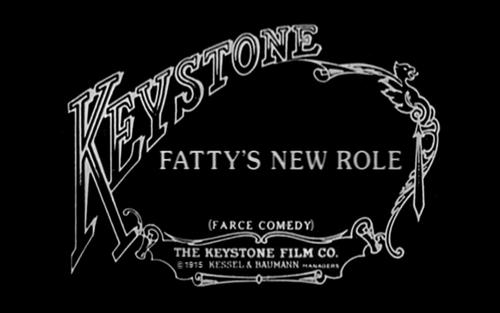
- Title card
- Directed by: Fatty Arbuckle
- Produced by: Mack Sennett
- Starring: Fatty Arbuckle
- Music by: Donald Sosin
- Production company: Keystone Studios
- Distributed by: Mutual Film
- Release date: February 1, 1915
- Running time: 13 minutes
- Country: United States
- Language: Silent (English intertitles)

Fatty's New Role is a 1915 American short comedy film directed by and starring Fatty Arbuckle. The film is extant.

== Cast ==
- Roscoe "Fatty" Arbuckle as Hobo
- Mack Swain as Ambrose Schnitz
- Joe Bordeaux
- Glen Cavender
- Bobby Dunn
- Billy Gilbert
- Frank Hayes
- Edgar Kennedy as Man who gives handout
- Hank Mann
- Frank Opperman
- Fritz Schade as Bar patron
- Al St. John as Cop
- Slim Summerville as Bartender
- Luke the Dog

== See also ==
- List of American films of 1915
- Fatty Arbuckle filmography
