= A Flirt's Mistake =

1914 film directed by George Nichols

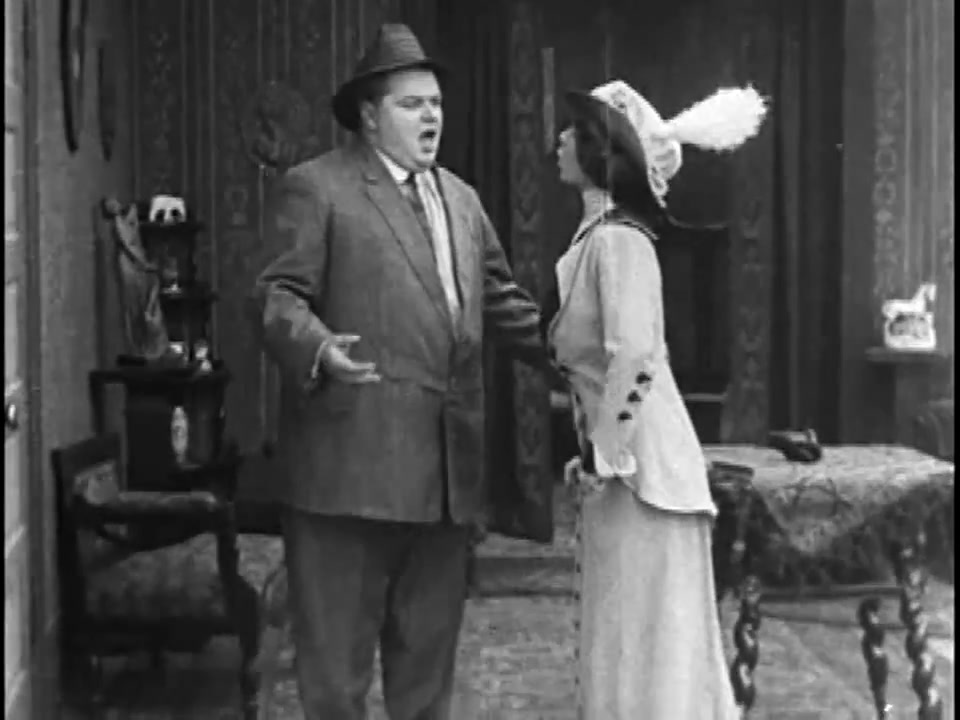
- Frame from film
- Directed by: George Nichols
- Produced by: Mack Sennett
- Starring: Fatty Arbuckle
- Distributed by: Keystone Film Company
- Release date: January 12, 1914
- Running time: 8 minutes
- Country: United States
- Language: Silent (English intertitles)

A Flirt's Mistake is a 1914 American short comedy film featuring Roscoe "Fatty" Arbuckle. The silent movie, produced by the Keystone Film Company, contains no onscreen cast or crew credits.

== Cast ==
- Roscoe "Fatty" Arbuckle
- Minta Durfee
- William Hauber as Cop
- Edgar Kennedy as The Rajah
- Virginia Kirtley
- Henry Lehrman (unconfirmed)
- George Nichols as Man in park

A Flirt's Mistake (1914)

== See also ==
- Roscoe Arbuckle filmography
