= Fritz Schade =

American actor

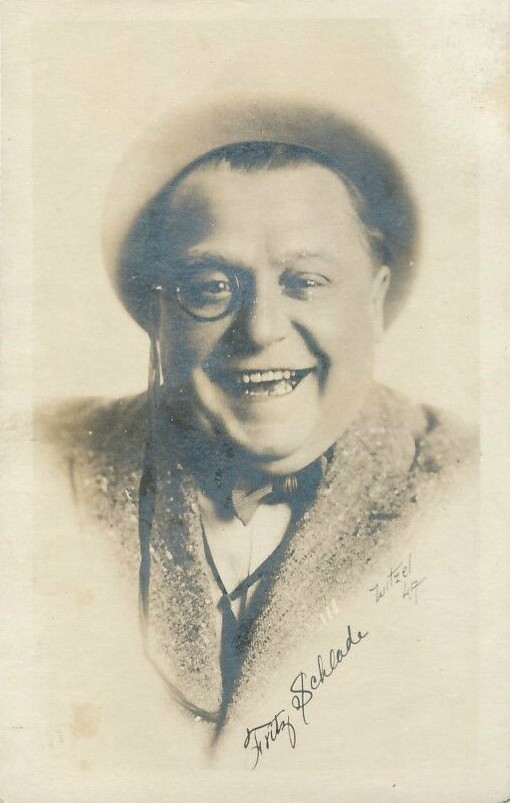
- Fritz Schade c. 1917
- Born: January 19, 1880; Dresden, Germany
- Died: June 17, 1926 (aged 46); Los Angeles, California, US
- Occupation: Actor
- Years active: 1913–1918
- Spouse: Betty Schade

Fritz Schade (January 19, 1880 – June 17, 1926) was a German-born American film actor of the silent era. He appeared in 41 films between 1913 and 1918, including six films with Charlie Chaplin. His wife was the silent film actress Betty Schade.

== Selected filmography ==
- Dough and Dynamite (1914)
- The Masquerader (1914)
- His Prehistoric Past (1914)
- The Face on the Bar Room Floor (1914)
- Laughing Gas (1914)
- His Musical Career (1914)
- Tillie's Punctured Romance (1914) as Waiter/Diner (uncredited)
- Fatty's New Role (1915) as Bar Patron
- Dangers of a Bride (1917)
- Whose Baby? (1917)
