= A Bath House Beauty =

1914 film

- Directed by: Fatty Arbuckle
- Starring: Fatty Arbuckle
- Release date: April 13, 1914
- Running time: 14 minutes
- Country: United States
- Languages: Silent; English intertitles

A Bath House Beauty is a 1914 American short comedy film directed by and starring Fatty Arbuckle.

== Cast ==
- Roscoe "Fatty" Arbuckle
- Gordon Griffith
- Ted Edwards
- Hank Mann
- Eva Nelson

== See also ==
- List of American films of 1914
- Fatty Arbuckle filmography
