= Guile of Women =

1921 film

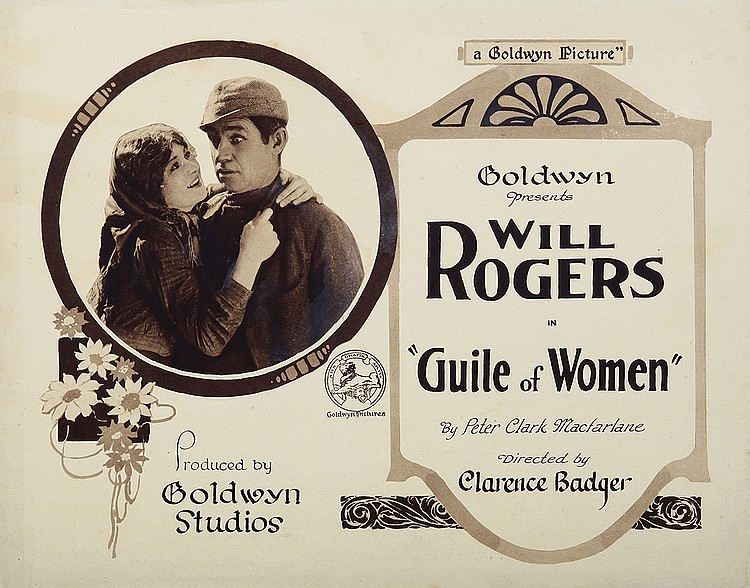
- Theatrical release poster
- Directed by: Clarence G. Badger
- Screenplay by: Edfrid A. Bingham
- Story by: Peter Clark Macfarlane
- Produced by: Samuel Goldwyn
- Starring: Will Rogers; Mary Warren; Bert Sprotte; Lionel Belmore; Charles Smiley; Nick Cogley
- Cinematography: Marcel Le Picard
- Production company: Goldwyn Pictures
- Distributed by: Goldwyn Pictures
- Release date: January 1, 1921
- Running time: 50 minutes
- Country: United States
- Language: Silent (English intertitles)

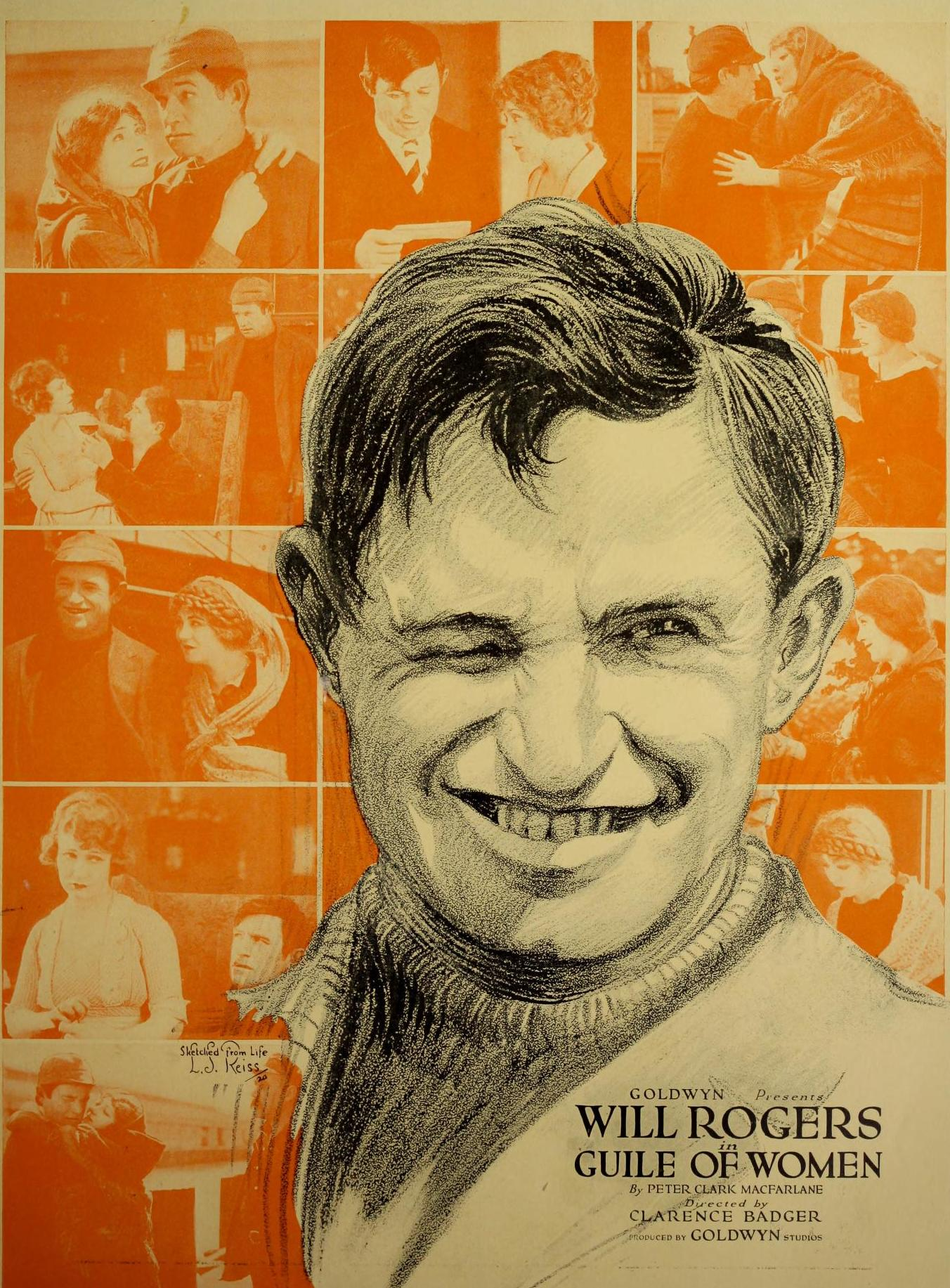
Guile of Women ad in Moving Picture World, 1920

Guile of Women is a 1921 American silent comedy film directed by Clarence G. Badger and written by Edfrid A. Bingham. The film stars Will Rogers, Mary Warren, Bert Sprotte, Lionel Belmore, Charles Smiley, and Nick Cogley. The film was released on January 1, 1921, by Goldwyn Pictures.

== Cast ==
- Will Rogers as Hjalmar Maartens
- Mary Warren as Hulda
- Bert Sprotte as Skole
- Lionel Belmore as Armstrong
- Charles Smiley as Captain Larsen
- Nick Cogley as Captain Stahl
- Doris Pawn as Annie
- John Lince as Butler
- Jane Starr as Maid

== Preservation ==
This film is now lost as no prints exist.
