= The Reward of the Faithless =

1917 film directed by Rex Ingram

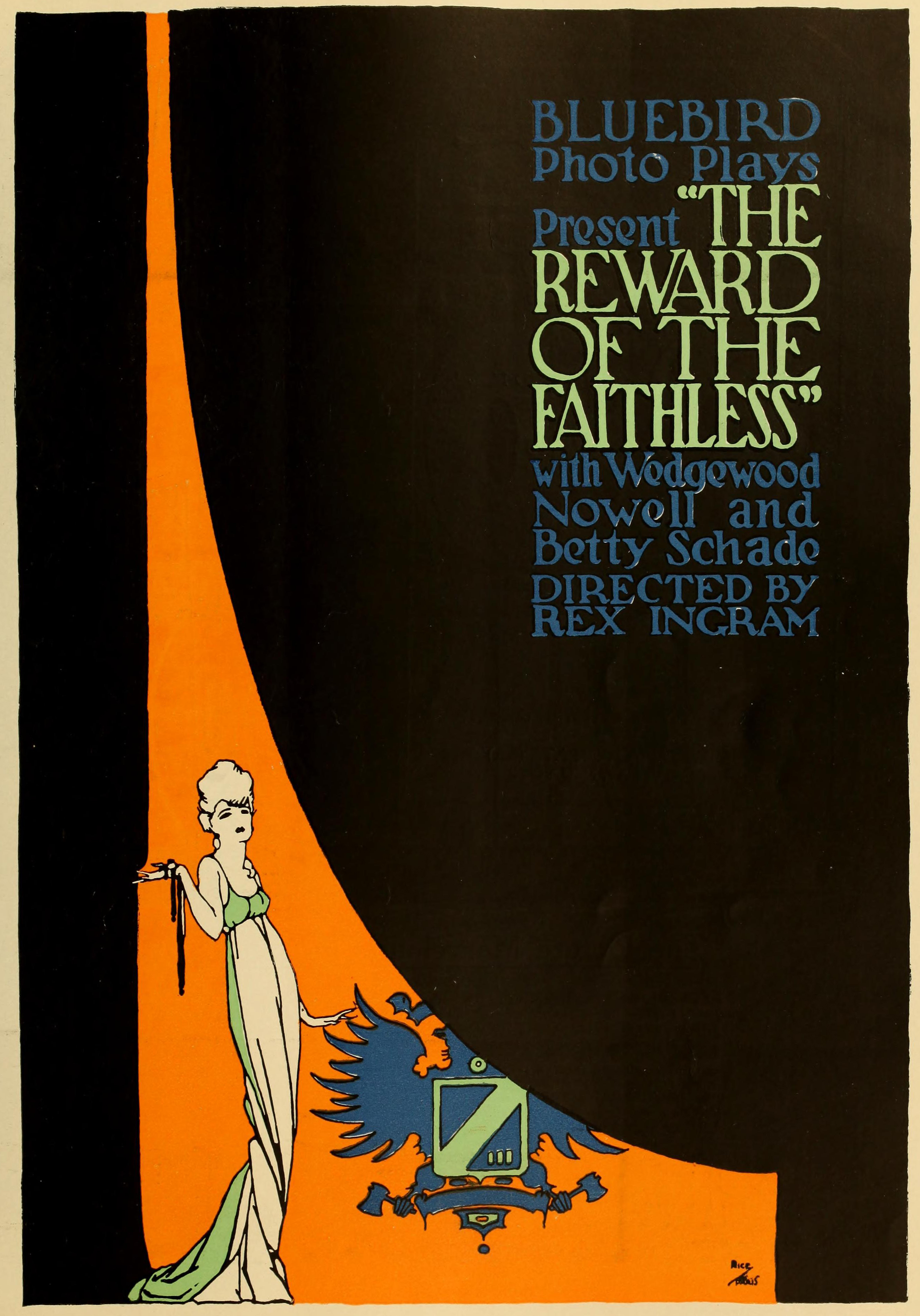
- Directed by: Rex Ingram
- Written by: E. Magnus Ingleton; Rex Ingram
- Starring: Claire Du Brey; Betty Schade; Wedgwood Nowell
- Cinematography: Ralph Perry
- Production company: Universal Pictures
- Distributed by: Universal Pictures
- Release date: February 12, 1917
- Country: United States
- Languages: Silent; English intertitles

The Reward of the Faithless is a 1917 American silent drama film directed by Rex Ingram and starring Claire Du Brey, Betty Schade and Wedgwood Nowell.

== Cast ==
- Claire Du Brey as Princess Dione
- Betty Schade as Anna
- Wedgwood Nowell as Guido Campanelli
- Nicholas Dunaew as Feodor Strogoff
- Dick La Reno as Prince Paul Ragusin
- William J. Dyer as Peter Vlasoff
- Yvette Mitchell as Anna Vlasoff
- J. Edwin Brown as Karl
- Bill Rathbone as A Cripple

== Bibliography ==
- Leonhard Gmür. Rex Ingram: Hollywood's Rebel of the Silver Screen. 2013.
