= The Woman Haters =

1913 film

- Directed by: Henry Lehrman
- Produced by: Mack Sennett
- Starring: Roscoe Arbuckle
- Production company: Keystone Film Company
- Distributed by: Mutual Film
- Release date: December 1, 1913
- Country: United States
- Languages: Silent; English intertitles

The Woman Haters is a 1913 American short silent comedy film featuring Roscoe "Fatty" Arbuckle.

== Cast ==
- Roscoe "Fatty" Arbuckle
- Nick Cogley

== See also ==
- Roscoe Arbuckle filmography
