= Harry Gribbon =

American actor and comedian (1885–1961)

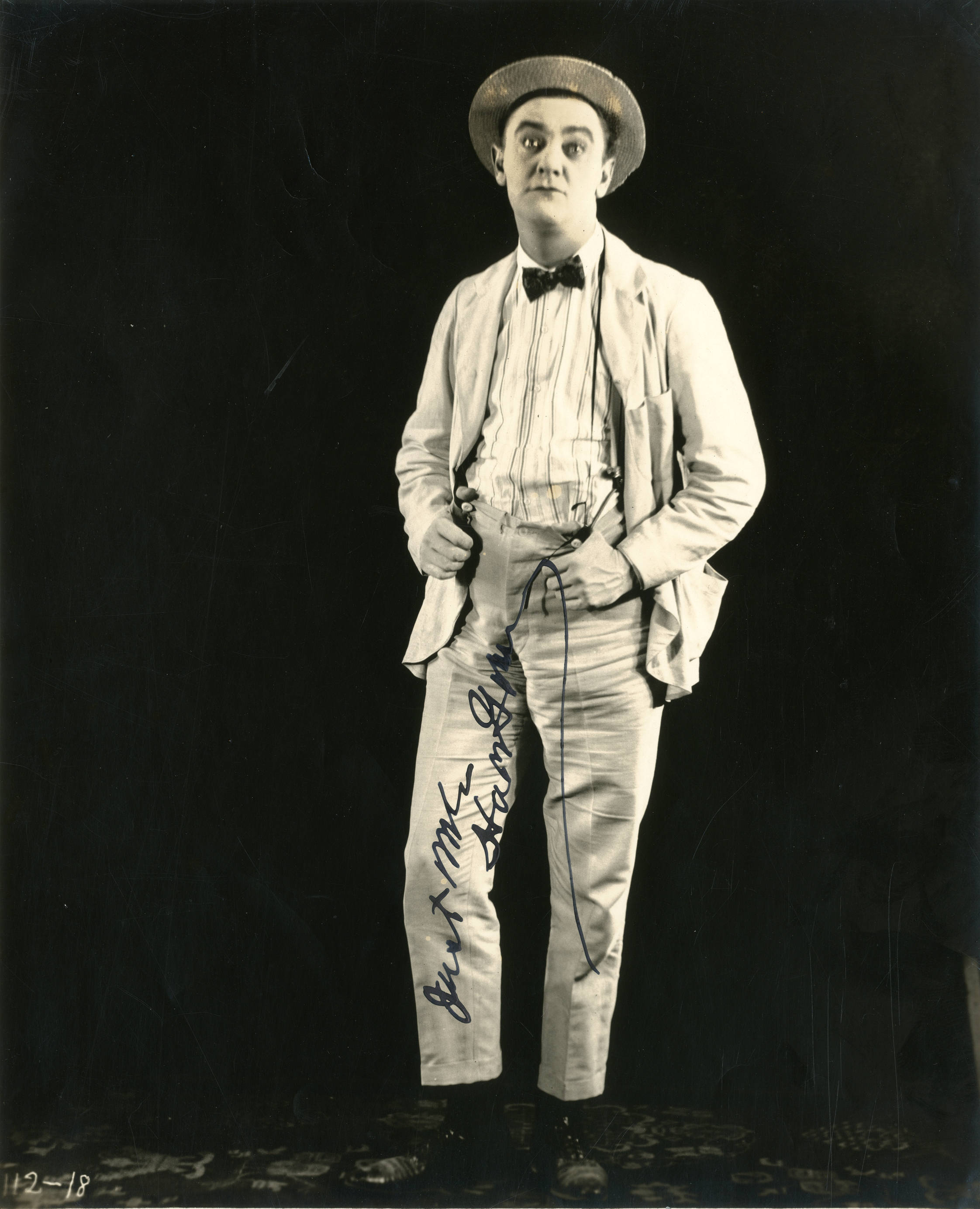
- Gribbon in 1923
- Born: Harry Peter Gribbon; June 9, 1885; New York City, U.S.
- Died: July 28, 1961 (aged 76); Los Angeles, California, U.S.
- Resting place: Holy Cross Cemetery, Culver City, California
- Other names: Rubber Face Harry; Silk Hat Harry
- Occupation: Actor
- Years active: 1915–1938
- Spouse: May Emory (m. 1918; died 1948)
- Relatives: Eddie Gribbon (brother)

Harry Peter Gribbon (June 9, 1885 – July 28, 1961) was an American film actor, comedian and director known for The Cameraman (1928), Show People (1928) and Art Trouble (1934). He appeared in more than 140 films between 1915 and 1938. Many of his films from this era have been lost.

== Early life ==
Harry Peter Gribbon was born on June 9, 1885, in New York City. He was the brother of actor Eddie Gribbon.

== Career ==
Gribbon started in vaudeville, performing on the Keith, Orpheum, and Pantages circuits, and in 1913 he became the leading man in the Ziegfeld Follies. He performed on stage in approximately 200 productions, including Buster Brown, The Man Who Owned Broadway, and The Red Widow, after which Mack Sennett signed him to make films. Gribbon's Broadway credits included Meet a Body (1944), Mr. Big (1941), Arsenic and Old Lace (1944), Delicate Story (1940), and Alley Cat (1934).

Gribbon worked for the L-KO Kompany. From 1915, Gribbon worked in silent cinema, first at Lubin under the sobriquet 'Rubber-faced Harry', which became 'Silk Hat Harry', when he joined Keystone later that year as top-hatted, amply moustachioed comic villain. During the sound era, acted in several RKO/Pathe short comediesar.

== Personal life and death ==
Gribbon was married to actress May Emory. He died on July 28, 1961, in Los Angeles, California at the Motion Picture Country Home. He was buried at Holy Cross Cemetery in Culver City, California next to his wife.

== Selected filmography ==
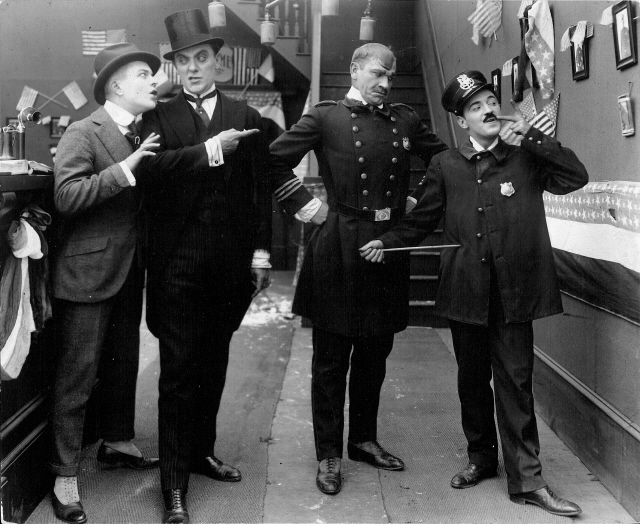
Gribbon (in top hat pointing) in 1916 in A Dash of Courage. Wallace Beery to his left.

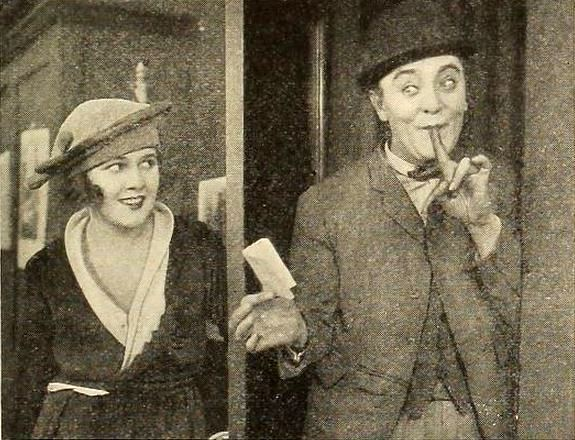
Myrtle Lind and Harry Gribbon in Rip & Stitch: Tailors (1919)

- Fatty and Mabel at the San Diego Exposition (1915)
- Mabel, Fatty and the Law (1915)
- Fatty and the Broadway Stars (1915)
- Their Social Splash (1915)
- A Social Cub (1916)
- A Dash of Courage (1916)
- Are Waitresses Safe? (1917)
- The King of the Kitchen (1918)
- Business Before Honesty (1918)
- Salome vs. Shenandoah (1919)
- Down on the Farm (1920)
- A Small Town Idol (1921)
- The Half-Back of Notre Dame (1924)
- Knockout Reilly (1927)
- Rose-Marie (1928)
- Chinatown Charlie (1928)
- The Cameraman (1928)
- Show People (1928)
- The Shakedown (1929)
- Tide of Empire (1929)
- The Bees' Buzz (1929)
- On with the Show! (1929)
- The Mysterious Island (1929)
- So Long Letty (1929)
- Midnight Daddies (1930)
- Dumb Dicks (1931)
- Ride Him, Cowboy (1932)
- The Kid from Spain (1932)
- Art Trouble (1934)
