= May Emory =

American actress (1880–1948)

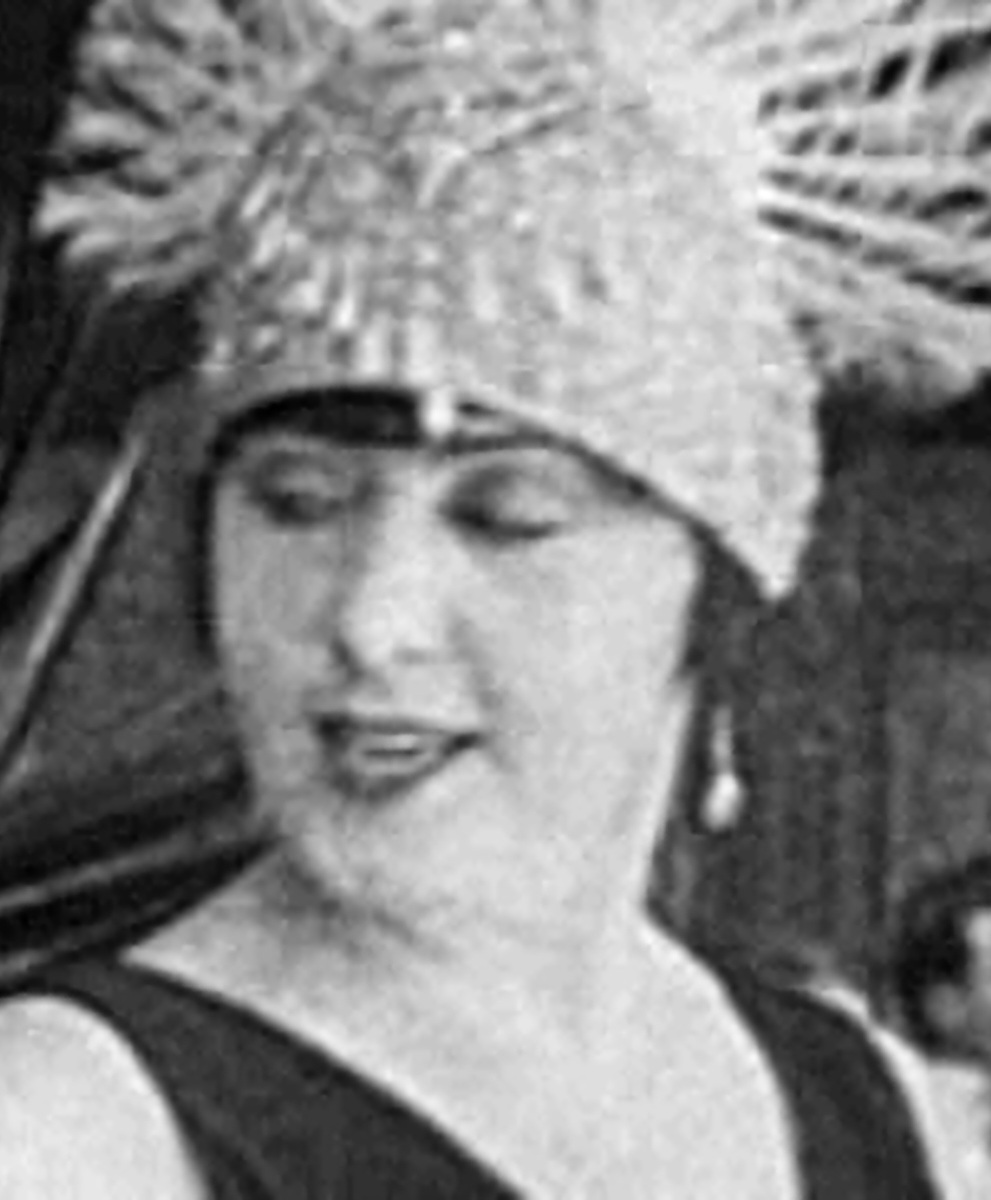
- Emory in Teddy at the Throttle (1917)
- Born: Minnie L. Snyder; November 11, 1880; Austin, Illinois, U.S.
- Died: October 15, 1948 (aged 67); New York City, U.S.
- Resting place: Holy Cross Cemetery, Culver City, California
- Other name: Mae Emory
- Occupation: Actress
- Years active: 1915–1920
- Spouse: Harry Gribbon (m. 1918)

May Emory (born Minnie L. Snyder; November 11, 1880 – October 15, 1948) was an American actress whose name was also seen as Mae Emory.

== Biography ==
Emory was born in Austin, Illinois. She performed in vaudeville, working with her husband on the Keith, Orpheum, and Pantages circuits. On stage, she performed with the Morton Opera Company, including a production of The Tenderfoot at the National Theatre in Boston in 1914. Her Broadway credits included Her Little Highness (1913), The Rose Maid (1912), The Merry Whirl (1910), A Skylark (1910), Ziegfeld Follies of 1908 (1908), A Parisian Model (1908), The Hoyden (1908), and Ziegfeld Follies of 1907 (1907).

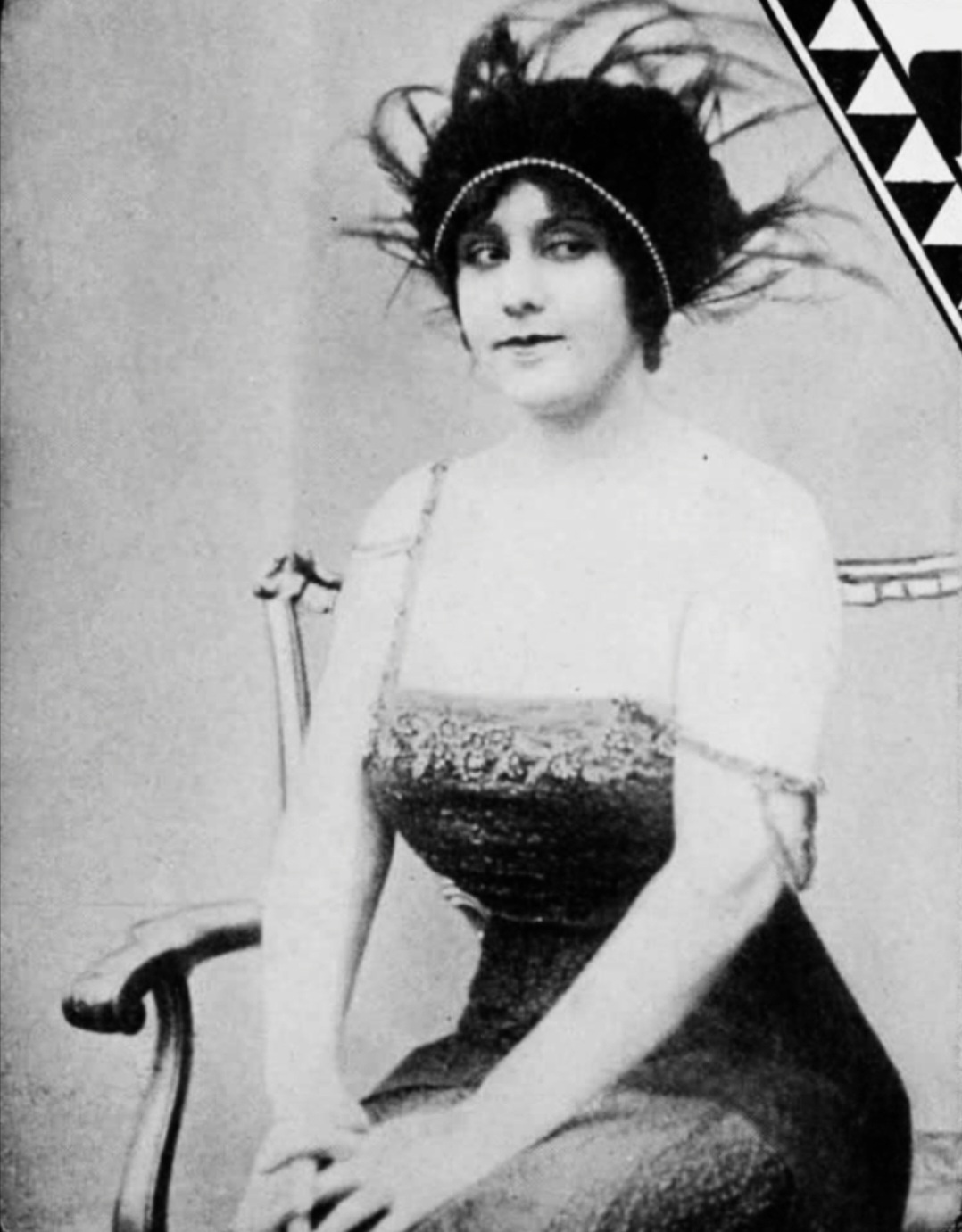
Emory in 1915

Emory and her husband, Harry Gribbon, joined the L-KO Kompany and began making comedy films. She appeared in 28 films between 1915 and 1919. Some of her work from Teddy at the Throttle appears in the 1960 compilation When Comedy Was King.

== Personal life ==
She was married to Harry Gribbon, brother of actor Eddie Gribbon. She is buried next to her husband at Holy Cross Cemetery in Culver City, California.

== Selected filmography ==
- That Little Band of Gold (1915)
- Life and Moving Pictures (1915)
- Love on an Empty Stomach (1915)
- A Tale of Twenty Stories (1915)
- Mister Flirt in Wrong (1915)
- Scandal in the Family (1915)
- Avenged by a Fish (1915)
- Does Flirting Pay? (1915)
- The Idle Rich (1915)
- His Father's Footsteps (1915)
- The Hunt (1915)
- A Movie Star (1916)
- Love Will Conquer (1916)
- Fido's Fate (1916)
- By Stork Delivery (1916)
- Caught on a Skyscraper (1916)
- His Bread and Butter (1916)
- Ambrose's Cup of Woe (1916)
- Madcap Ambrose (1916)
- A Social Cub (1916)
- Vampire Ambrose (1916)
- Stars and Bars (1917)
- Teddy at the Throttle (1917)
- Thirst (1917)
- Business Before Honesty (1918)
- A Pullman Blunder (1918)
- The King of the Kitchen (1918)
- Work or Fight (1918)
- A Taste of Life (1919)
- Footlight Maids (1919)
- Welcome Home (1920)
