= Fatty's Tintype Tangle =

1915 film by Roscoe Arbuckle

- Directed by: Fatty Arbuckle
- Produced by: Mack Sennett
- Starring: Fatty Arbuckle
- Release date: July 26, 1915
- Running time: 27 minutes
- Country: United States
- Languages: Silent; English intertitles

Fatty's Tintype Tangle is a 1915 American comedy short film directed by and starring Roscoe "Fatty" Arbuckle. The two-reel film follows Fatty, a man who, frustrated by his mother-in-law's constant nagging, leaves home and sits on a park bench. There, a tintype photographer captures a picture of him sitting beside a married woman, which leads to conflict when her husband becomes jealous.

The cast includes Louise Fazenda, Edgar Kennedy, Minta Durfee, and Frank Hayes. Notable in the film are Arbuckle's physical comedy skills, including several feats of dexterity early on and a sequence near the end in which he runs and bounces across 17 closely spaced telephone wires approximately 20 feet (6 meters) above the ground.

In 1995, Fatty's Tintype Tangle was selected for preservation in the United States National Film Registry by the Library of Congress for being "culturally, historically, or aesthetically significant." The film has frequently been broadcast on Turner Classic Movies.

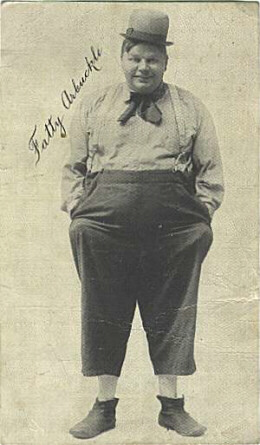
Roscoe "Fatty" Arbuckle

== Plot ==
Fatty becomes fed up with his mother-in-law's constant nagging and leaves his home in frustration. While drinking on a park bench, a tintype photograph is taken of him with a woman sitting beside him. When Edgar, the woman's husband, sees the photo, he becomes intensely jealous. Fearing confrontation, Fatty decides to leave the city temporarily, telling his wife he will be on a business trip for several months. During his absence, his wife moves in with her mother and rents their house to Edgar and his wife. Upon Fatty's return, he is surprised to find Edgar residing in his home.

== Cast ==
- Roscoe "Fatty" Arbuckle - Fatty
- Louise Fazenda - Edgar's Wife
- Edgar Kennedy - Edgar
- Norma Nichols - Fatty's wife
- Mai Wells - Fatty's mother-in-law
- Frank Hayes - Police Chief
- Joe Bordeaux - Passerby with Banana
- Glen Cavender - Photographer
- Bobby Dunn - Laughing Man (uncredited)
- Ted Edwards - Cop (uncredited)
- Charles Lakin - Cop (uncredited)

== See also ==
- List of American films of 1915
- Fatty Arbuckle filmography
