= Passions, He Had Three =

1913 film

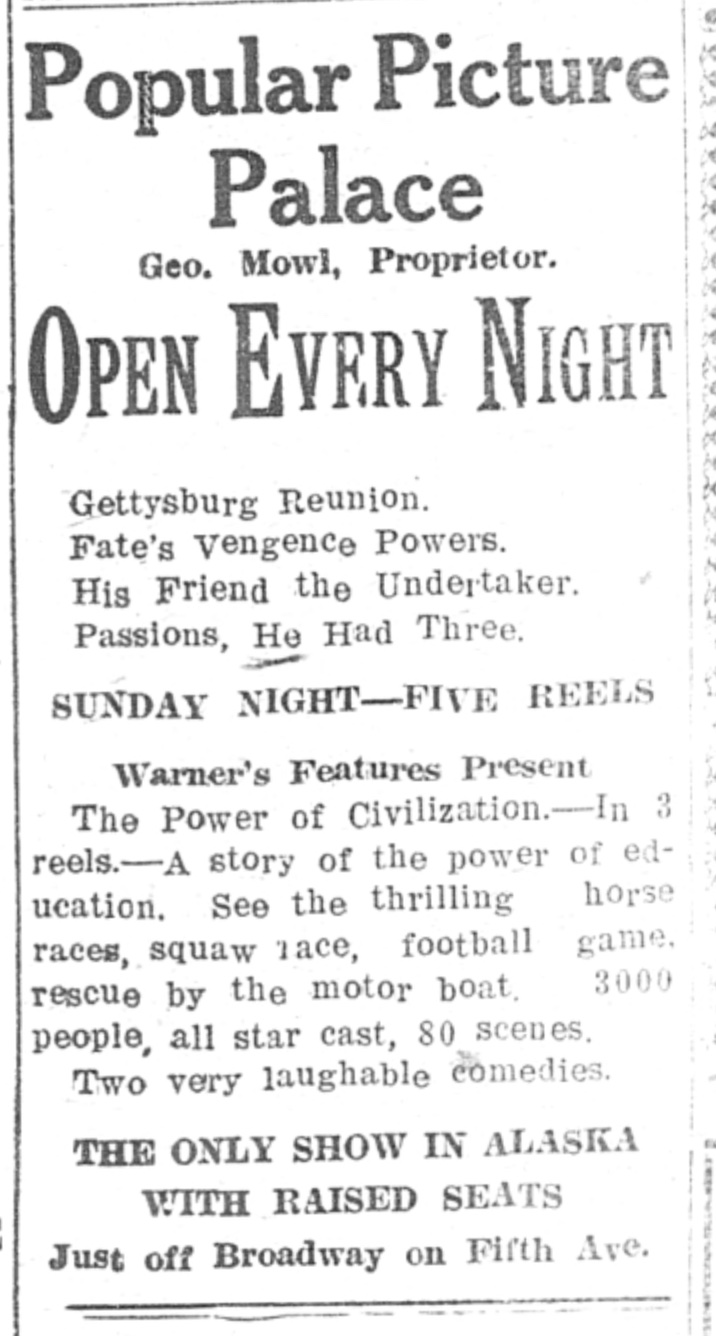
- Contemporary advertisement for several films including Passions, He Had Three
- Directed by: Henry Lehrman
- Produced by: Mack Sennett
- Starring: Roscoe Arbuckle; Mabel Normand
- Distributed by: Mutual Film
- Release date: June 5, 1913
- Country: United States
- Languages: Silent; English intertitles

Passions, He Had Three is a 1913 American short comedy film featuring Roscoe Arbuckle and Mabel Normand.

== Cast ==
- Roscoe "Fatty" Arbuckle
- Beatrice Van
- Nick Cogley
- Alice Davenport
- Dot Farley
- Mabel Normand
- Betty Schade
- Al St. John

== See also ==
- List of American films of 1913
- Fatty Arbuckle filmography
