= Our Country Cousins =

1914 film

- Directed by: Mack Sennett
- Starring: Fatty Arbuckle
- Release date: June 6, 1914
- Country: United States
- Language: Silent with English intertitles

Our Country Cousins is a 1914 American short comedy film. Directed by Mack Sennett, it starred Fatty Arbuckle.

== Plot ==
The farmer has two sons. His niece visits the farm and the two sons fall in love with her. She and one of the sons elope. The priest declines to marry them, and the Keystone Cops chase after the couple. The couple tumble off a cliff and the police officers try numerous times to save her. Their attempts to save her lead to their falling off the cliff too.

== Cast ==
- Roscoe "Fatty" Arbuckle
- Charley Chase
- Edgar Kennedy
- Rube Miller
- Al St. John

== Production ==
The film's working title was Rube Elopement. It was filmed between May 8, 1914, and May 18, 1914, and post-production was completed on May 24, 1914. The film was released on June 6, 1914, and had a length of 943 out of 1,000 feet. It was directed by Mack Sennett for Keystone Studios.

The author Brent E. Walker wrote that a secondary source known for being inaccurate had wrongly said Dell Henderson was the film's director and Rube Miller and Charley Chase were members of the film's cast. Walker said Miller's and Chase's appearance in the film was "unverified but unlikely".

== Reception ==
Motion Picture News said, "The comedy is sure to produce a laugh, but is not equal to the usual Keystone." The Moving Picture World praised the film, writing, "Farm characters and an elopement that has the Keystone flavor and is sure to make laughter. It has unexpected and very funny incidents and will surely make an excellent offering." Kinematograph and Lantern Weekly said "the whole thing ends in a glorious scrimmage".

Maitland Mercury stated, "The niece falls down a cliff, and most of the rest fall down a great number of times in the attempt to rescue her, their antics being certain to cause tumultuous laughter." In a mixed review, The Riverine Grazier said, "was like many comic films, somewhat overdone, but it was most successful as a mirth producer". Lewistown Daily News stated that the film is "another of those screaming Keystone comedies only this is said to be even better than a good many of them". Folkestone Herald called Our Country Cousins "a very funny Keystone release featuring the famous Keystone Police".

== See also ==
- List of American films of 1914
- Fatty Arbuckle filmography
