= Fatty's Reckless Fling =

1915 film

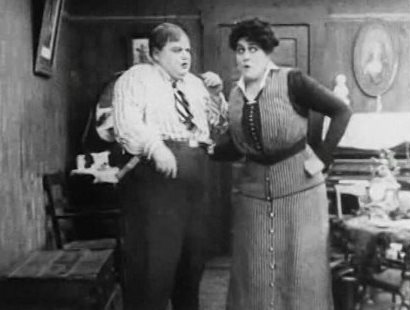
- Film still
- Directed by: Fatty Arbuckle
- Produced by: Mack Sennett
- Starring: Fatty Arbuckle
- Production company: Keystone Studios
- Distributed by: Mutual Film
- Release date: March 4, 1915
- Running time: 13 minutes
- Country: United States
- Language: Silent (English intertitles)

Fatty's Reckless Fling is a 1915 American short comedy film directed by and starring Fatty Arbuckle. The film is extant.

== Cast ==
- Roscoe "Fatty" Arbuckle as Fatty
- Edgar Kennedy as Neighbor
- Minta Durfee as Neighbor's Wife
- Katherine Griffith as Fatty's Wife
- Billie Walsh as Bartender
- Glen Cavender as House detective
- Frank Hayes as Card Player (uncredited)
- Ted Edwards as Card Player (uncredited)
- Grover Ligon as Card Player (uncredited)
- Venice Hayes as Girl Fatty Sits On (uncredited)
- Harry McCoy as Drunk (uncredited)
- George Ovey as Card Player (uncredited)

== See also ==
- List of American films of 1915
- Fatty Arbuckle filmography
