= Won by a Neck =

1930 American Pre-Code comedy film

- Directed by: Fatty Arbuckle (as William Goodrich)
- Written by: Walter DeLeon; Harry McCoy; Tom Whiteley
- Starring: Lloyd Hamilton
- Release date: October 5, 1930
- Running time: 25 minutes
- Country: United States
- Language: English

Won by a Neck is a 1930 American Pre-Code comedy film directed by Fatty Arbuckle and starring Lloyd Hamilton.

The film has two reels.

== Plot ==
Detective Percy enters the home of a gangster, One-Shot Louie, thinking it is a chiropractor's practice and that he will have his stiff neck fixed. Louie thinks Percy is a rival gangster, while an actual rival gunman thinks Percy is Louie.

== Cast ==
- Lloyd Hamilton as Detective Percy
- Ed Barry as One-Shot Louie, a gunman
- Ruth Hiatt
- Addie McPhail

== See also ==
- Fatty Arbuckle filmography
