= Nobody's Wife (1918 film) =

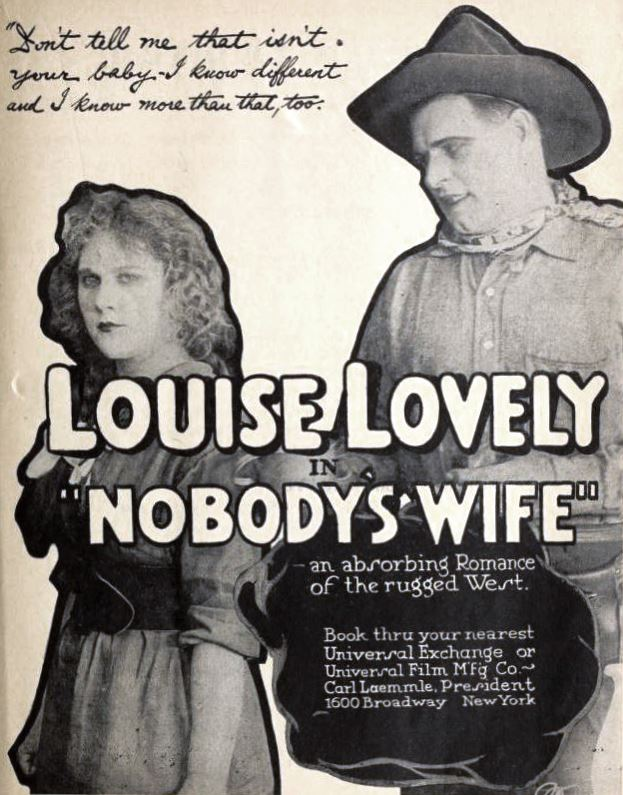
- Directed by: Edward LeSaint
- Written by: Robert N. Bradbury; Frank Howard Clark; Charles Kenyon
- Produced by: Louise Lovely
- Starring: Louise Lovely; Jack Hoxie; Betty Schade
- Cinematography: Friend Baker
- Production company: Universal Pictures
- Distributed by: Universal Pictures
- Release date: March 4, 1918
- Running time: 50 minutes
- Country: United States
- Languages: Silent; English intertitles

Nobody's Wife is a 1918 American silent drama film directed by Edward LeSaint and starring Jack Hoxie, Louise Lovely and Alfred Allen.

== Cast ==
- Jack Hoxie as Jack Darling
- Louise Lovely as Hope Ross
- Alfred Allen as Sheriff Carew, aka Alec Young
- Betty Schade as Dancing Pete
- A.G. Kenyon as Tom Smythe
- Grace McLean as Betty Smythe

== Bibliography ==
- Rainey, Buck. Sweethearts of the Sage: Biographies and Filmographies of 258 actresses appearing in Western movies. McFarland & Company, 1992.
