= Among the Mourners =

1914 film directed by Dell Henderson

- Directed by: Dell Henderson
- Starring: Fatty Arbuckle
- Release date: November 28, 1914
- Country: United States
- Languages: Silent; English intertitles

Among the Mourners is a 1914 short comedy film starring Fatty Arbuckle. A print of Among the Mourners exists.

== Cast ==
- Roscoe "Fatty" Arbuckle
- Charley Chase
- Mack Swain

== See also ==
- List of American films of 1914
- Roscoe Arbuckle filmography
