= Love and Courage =

1913 film

- Directed by: Henry Lehrman
- Starring: Fatty Arbuckle
- Release date: July 21, 1913
- Country: United States
- Languages: Silent; English intertitles

Love and Courage is a 1913 American short comedy film featuring Fatty Arbuckle.

== Cast ==
- Roscoe "Fatty" Arbuckle
- Mabel Normand
- Ford Sterling

== See also ==
- Fatty Arbuckle filmography
