= His Bread and Butter =

1916 American silent comedy directed by Edward F. Cline

- Directed by: Edward F. Cline
- Produced by: Mack Sennett
- Starring: Hank Mann; Peggy Pearce; Slim Summerville; Bobby Dunn
- Cinematography: K.C. MacLean
- Production company: Keystone Film Company
- Distributed by: Triangle Film Corporation
- Release date: 1916
- Running time: 20 minutes
- Country: United States
- Language: silent film with intertitles in English

His Bread and Butter is an American silent comedy directed by Edward F. Cline, released in 1916. This was Cline's first film as a director.

== Plot ==
A husband says goodbye to his wife and departs for work. Facing her to wave goodbye, he walks backward up and through a stopped trolley and into an adjacent car that is also stopped. He immediately takes out a picture of his wife and is so engrossed that he fails to notice that he is sitting next to a woman passenger in the car. She taps him on the shoulder and, still staring at his wife's picture, he pulls a coin out of his pocket and gives it to the woman. She becomes enraged and throws him out of the car.

Late, the husband hurries to the restaurant where he is a waiter. He grabs food that is ready and attempts to serve it, but gives the wrong items to customers. After this, the head waiter gives him a sign, "Wanted Lady Cashier Must Not Be Married" to put outside. Instead, the husband turns the sign backwards, and uses the phone restaurant office to call his wife. He tells her that if she pretends not to be married and applies, that she can double their income.

The husband then waits on wine party of three men in a private room. His wife arrives at the café, and starts work as the cashier. The head waiter and the café owner appear smitten with her. The owner then carries champagne to the wine part but is almost hit with a large knife and fork and a plate that the husband tosses out of the private room into the hall. Meanwhile, the head waiter brings the new cashier to the office, puts a record on the victrola, and starts to dance with her. The husband leaves the private room, appears to hear the music in the office, then starts dancing by himself outside the door. The owner approaches, crosses his arms as he looks at the husband, who points to the door. The owner goes into the office as he pushes the husband away. The owner sees the head waiter and the cashier, has the cashier stay and indicates to the head waiter to leave. The owner then dances with the cashier while her husband follows the head waiter into the restaurant to admonish him.

The owner then tells the husband to get something to drink. He brings a bottle of champagne. The owner then tells husband "Don't let anyone disturb us". The wife/cashier, however, knocks over the bottle, getting her dress wet. She and the owner leave the office. The waiter then takes the check to the private party, who trick him so they do not pay. The owner then comes, determines the situation, then fires the head waiter. The owner then takes the wife/cashier out on a lunch break to a park, and the husband follows in disguise. While the owner goes to buy coffee, the ex-head waiter appears with two ruffians. The latter sit on either side of the wife, who accost her. The head waiter's plan is to intervene and appear to be a hero, but the owner returns and fights off both the ruffians and dispatches the ex-head waiter. The husband approaches in disguise, but the owner dispatches with him as well.

The ex-head waiter then finds and puts a large insect down the owner's clothes, whereupon the owner ducks behind a sheet drying on the line. Although he finds the insect while stripped down to his polka-dot long johns, putting his clothes on the line, a woman pulls the line with the sheet and clothes toward her. His state of undress horrifies her, the wife, and other horrified park-goers. He next encounters the ex-head waiter, whom he deduces was responsible for the insect in his clothes. They tussele, the ex-head waiter loses his pants, and then a policeman chases them both.

The owner excapes into a bedroom window, which happens to be the home of the husband and wife. The wife comes home and the owner initially hides in the closet as the wife enters and leaves the bedroom. The husband then comes home and after a tense moment, hugs with his wife. The owner spies through the cracked bedroom door and "He learns the truth" that they are married. He attempts to hide, but finding the window and door stuck, he hides under the bed-sheets. The husband and wife sit on the bed and on the owner. The husband then pulls off the sheet, revealing the owner. The husband grabs a gun from a dresser drawer and threatens to shoot the owner. They tussle as the wife calls the police. The owner escapes and steals a car. The husband follows, commandeers a motorcycle, and chases him. The police appear and the wife, and the ex-head waiter, who has appeared on the street, get in the car and join in the chase. The husband catches the first car, jumps in, and pulls the café owner out, leaving the car to run in circles as they fight. The husband eventually lands on the front of the police car, the owner on top of the driver-less car, and both collide. After initially continuing the fight, the owner runs off, as does the ex-head waiter. The husband and wife reconcile and walk off, leaving the police to puzzle over the collision of the two cars, which has left them in an inverted v-shape, with the fronts pointed upward.

== Cast ==
- Hank Mann as the jealous waiter
- Peggy Pearce as the waiter's wife
- Slim Summerville as the owner of the café
- Bobby Dunn as the head waiter
- Claire Anderson as a waitress
- Wayland Trask as the cook
- Nick Cogley as the chief of police
- Eddie Baker as a café customer
- Robert P. Kerr as the man who trips over the cook
- Erle C. Kenton a guest at the wine tasting
- Malcolm St. Clair as a guest at the wine tasting
- Bobby Vernon as a guest at the wine tasting
- May Emory as a woman

== MOMA screenings ==
The Museum of Modern Art included screenings of His Bread and Butter in at least three different programs.

- The Art of the Motion Picture, Series IX: Forty Years of American Film Comedy, Part I (1940)
- Screen Personalities (1952)
- American Film Comedy (1959)
