= The Fatal Taxicab =

1913 film

- Directed by: Mack Sennett
- Produced by: Mack Sennett
- Starring: Fatty Arbuckle
- Release date: September 18, 1913
- Country: United States
- Languages: Silent; English intertitles

The Fatal Taxicab is a 1913 American short comedy film featuring Fatty Arbuckle. It is also known in some sources as The Faithful Taxicab.

== Plot ==
The villainous Egbert Throckmorton presses his attentions on a resisting Mabel. Her lover tries to intervene, and gets pushed in a lake. The Keystone Cops are called, and Throckmorton flees in a taxicab. During a furious chase, Throckmorton's taxi goes over a precipice, and lands in a tree.

== Cast ==
The cast included:

- Mabel Normand: Mabel
- Roscoe "Fatty" Arbuckle: Her Lover
- Ford Sterling: Egbert Throckmorton
- Charles Inslee: Henchman

== See also ==
- List of American films of 1913
- Fatty Arbuckle filmography
