= A Bandit =

1913 film

- Directed by: Mack Sennett
- Produced by: Mack Sennett
- Starring: Fatty Arbuckle
- Release date: June 23, 1913
- Country: United States
- Languages: Silent; English intertitles

A Bandit is a 1913 American short, silent comedy film featuring Fatty Arbuckle. A print of the film survives.

== Cast ==
- Roscoe "Fatty" Arbuckle
- Nick Cogley
- Ford Sterling as The Bandit
- Al St. John

== See also ==
- List of American films of 1913
- Fatty Arbuckle filmography
