= A Film Johnnie =

- Directed by: George Nichols
- Written by: Craig Hutchinson
- Produced by: Mack Sennett
- Starring: Charles Chaplin; Roscoe Arbuckle; Virginia Kirtley; Mabel Normand; Ford Sterling
- Cinematography: Frank D. Williams
- Distributed by: Keystone Studios
- Release date: March 2, 1914
- Running time: ca. 12 minutes
- Country: United States
- Languages: Silent; English (original titles)

A Film Johnnie (1914)

A Film Johnnie is a 1914 American short silent film starring Charlie Chaplin, Roscoe Arbuckle, and Mabel Normand, and directed by George Nichols. Chaplin made the film during his time at Keystone Studios, working with producer Mack Sennett, who also appears in the film. The title comes from British slang for a "young fellow."

== Plot ==
After entering a Nickelodeon, The Tramp falls in love with one of the on-screen actresses. He then goes to the Keystone Studios lot and follows others, including Roscoe Arbuckle, Ford Sterling, and Mack Sennett inside. While there he ruins several scenes being shot, including a staged argument between Virginia Kirtley and another actor, and a rescue that takes place during a real fire.

== Production ==
A Film Johnnie is the first Charlie Chaplin film set in a movie studio, and he appears without his signature cane for much of the film's runtime. Chaplin had creative differences with actor turned director George Nichols, saying,

"[Nichols] had but one gag, which was to take the comedian by the neck and bounce him from one scene to another. I tried to suggest subtler business, but he...would not listen. 'We have no time, no time!' he would cry... Although I mildly rebelled, it appears he went to Sennett saying that I was a son of a bitch to work with... I tried to reason with members of the cast, but they also were against me."

But the film is the first time Chaplin appeared in a film with a pre-planned scenario, written to play to Chaplin's strengths as a performer. Also, despite their differences, Nichols allowed Chaplin to introduce and develop many characteristics of The Tramp in this film, including his walk, various hat tricks, playing with the cane he finds at the movie studio, and humorous misuse of items like a revolver as a toothpick and an old sock as a handkerchief.

== Reviews ==
A reviewer for Bioscope wrote of Chaplin and A Film Johnnie, "Another triumph for the old Karno comedian. Knockabout of an extraordinary character. An extra special comedy." A reviewer for Moving Picture World wrote, "Edgar English's [Chaplin's] work in this picture will keep it amusing." And a reviewer for The Cinema wrote, "The sensation of the year is the success of Chas. Chaplin...One of his films is A Film Johnny [sic] which shows how his admiration of a film beauty led to a commotion in a cinema and finally took him to the Keystone Studio–and a job. All the Keystone heads are in this [film] and it is packed with indescribably funny incidents."

== See also ==
- List of American films of 1914
- Charlie Chaplin filmography
- Roscoe Arbuckle filmography
