= The Gypsy Queen =

1913 American silent film

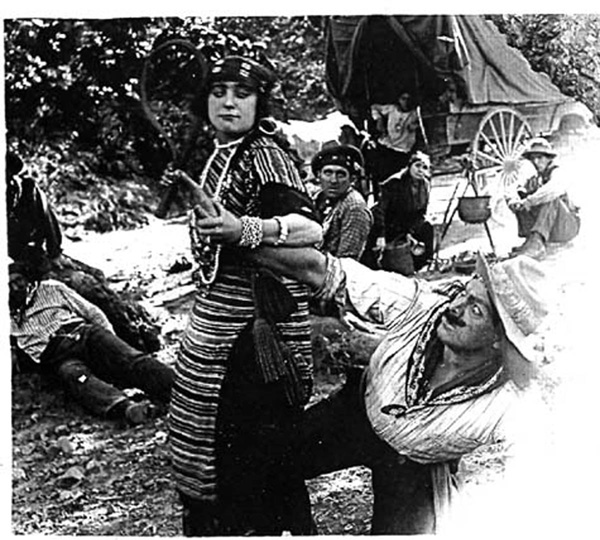
- A still from the film
- Directed by: Mack Sennett
- Starring: Fatty Arbuckle; Mabel Normand
- Distributed by: Mutual Film
- Release date: September 11, 1913
- Country: United States
- Language: Silent with English intertitles

The Gypsy Queen is a 1913 American silent short comedy film directed by Mack Sennett and featuring Roscoe Arbuckle and Mabel Normand.

== Cast ==
- Roscoe "Fatty" Arbuckle
- Mabel Normand
- Nick Cogley

== See also ==
- List of American films of 1913
- List of comedy films before 1920
