= Mabel's New Hero =

1913 film

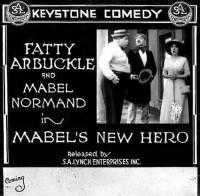
- Lantern slide
- Directed by: Mack Sennett
- Starring: Mabel Normand; Fatty Arbuckle; The Keystone Cops
- Release date: August 28, 1913
- Running time: 10 minutes
- Country: United States
- Languages: Silent; English intertitles

Mabel's New Hero is a 1913 American short comedy film featuring Mabel Normand, Fatty Arbuckle, and the Keystone Cops.

== Plot ==
At the beach, it's up to Fatty to save Mabel from a masher's attentions, and again to rescue her from a out-of-control observation balloon.

== Cast ==
The cast includes:

- Mabel Normand as Mabel
- Roscoe "Fatty" Arbuckle as Fatty
- Charles Inslee as Hansome Harry
- Virginia Kirtley as Mabel's friend
- Charles Avery as Cop
- Edgar Kennedy as Cop
- Hank Mann as Cop

== See also ==
- List of American films of 1913
- Fatty Arbuckle filmography
