= Fatty and Mabel at the San Diego Exposition =

1915 film

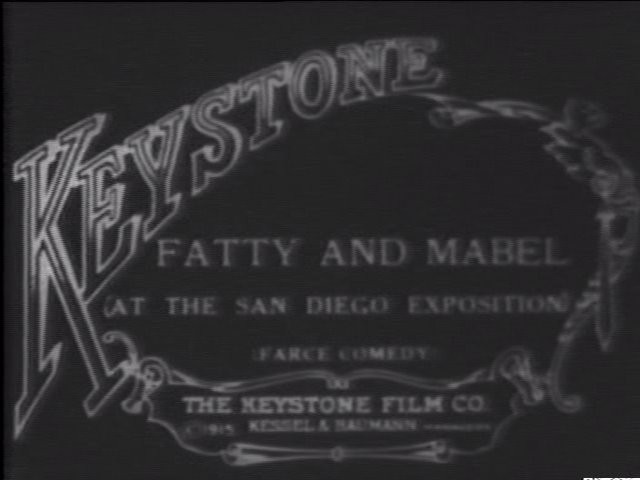
- Directed by: Fatty Arbuckle
- Produced by: Mack Sennett
- Starring: Fatty Arbuckle; Mabel Normand
- Production company: Keystone Film Company
- Distributed by: Mutual Film
- Release date: January 23, 1915
- Running time: 14 minutes
- Country: United States
- Language: Silent (English intertitles)

Fatty and Mabel at the San Diego Exposition is a 1915 American silent black-and-white short comedy film, directed by Fatty Arbuckle and starring Arbuckle and Mabel Normand. It was produced by Keystone Studios.

== Plot ==
Fatty And Mabel At The San Diego Exposition (1915)

Fatty (Roscoe Arbuckle) and Mabel (Mabel Normand) are a married couple visiting the Exposition. Fatty gets in trouble by flirting with a passing woman (Minta Durfee) while Mabel shops. He chases the woman into a hula pavilion and makes approaches to the dancers. He is accosted by both Mabel and the woman's husband; eventually the police are called to straighten the whole thing out.

== Cast ==
- Roscoe 'Fatty' Arbuckle as Fatty
- Mabel Normand as Mabel
- Minta Durfee
- Harry Gribbon as Man in audience at hula show
- Frank Hayes
- Edgar Kennedy as Cop
- Joe Bordeaux as Flirty guy in go-cart

== Production background ==
Arbuckle and Normand followed the Keystone tradition of showing up at an actual event and using that as background for a largely improvised film. The event in this case was the Panama–California Exposition, held in Balboa Park in San Diego, California, in 1915–1916. The film is 14 minutes long. It was released on January 23, 1915.

== See also ==
- Fatty Arbuckle filmography
- Mabel and Fatty Viewing the World's Fair at San Francisco (1915)
