= The Moonshiners (1916 film) =

1916 film

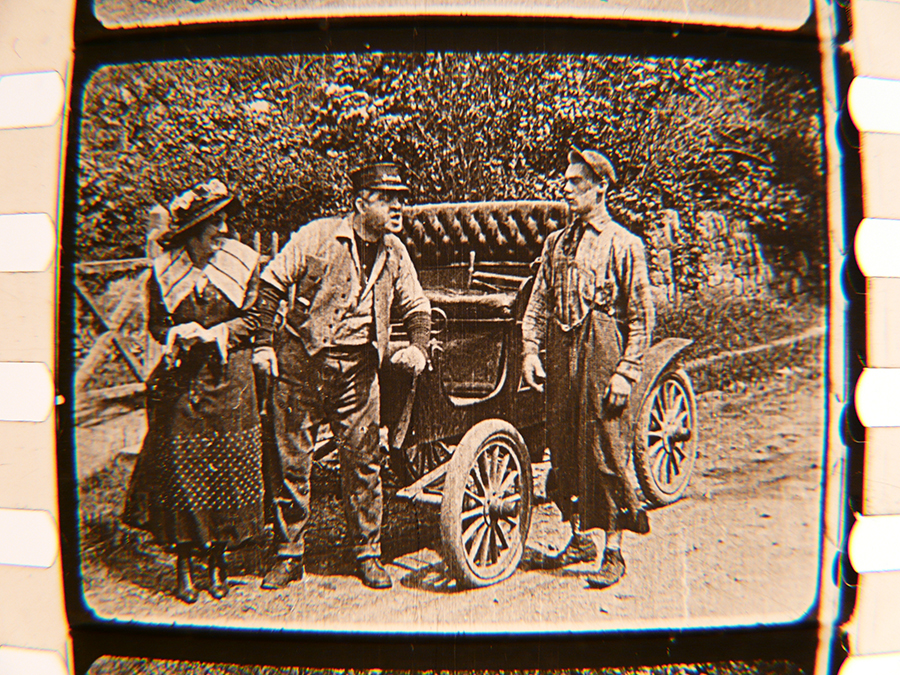
- Directed by: Fatty Arbuckle
- Starring: Joe Bordeaux
- Release date: May 14, 1916
- Country: United States
- Languages: Silent; English intertitles

The Moonshiners is a 1916 American short comedy film directed by Fatty Arbuckle.

== Cast ==
- Joe Bordeaux
- J. Herbert Frank (as Bert Frank)
- Horace Haine
- Alice Lake
- Al St. John
- Michael Eagan
