= Leading Lizzie Astray =

1914 film

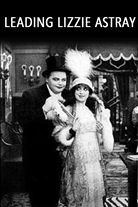
- Directed by: Fatty Arbuckle
- Produced by: Mack Sennett
- Starring: Fatty Arbuckle
- Distributed by: Mutual Film
- Release date: November 30, 1914
- Running time: 12 minutes
- Country: United States
- Languages: Silent; English intertitles

Leading Lizzie Astray is a 1914 American

short comedy film directed by and starring Fatty Arbuckle, and produced by Mack Sennett. It was described at the time as "a roar from start to finish, and one of the funniest the Keystone people have ever produced."

== Cast ==
- Roscoe "Fatty" Arbuckle as A Farm Boy
- Minta Durfee as Lizzie, the Farm Boy's Fiancée
- Ed Brady as A City Slicker
- Mack Swain as In from the Mines
- Edgar Kennedy as The Slicker's Chauffeur
- Phyllis Allen as Amorous Cafe Patron
- Charley Chase as Cafe Patron
- Al St. John as Cafe Patron
- Slim Summerville as Cafe Patron
- Leo White as Cafe Patron
- Jess Dandy as Cafe Patron (uncredited)
- Frank Hayes as Monocled Cafe Patron (uncredited)
- Steve Murphy as Sailor Cafe Patron (uncredited)

== See also ==
- List of American films of 1914
- Roscoe Arbuckle filmography
