= Si Si Senor =

1930 film by Fatty Arbuckle

- Directed by: Fatty Arbuckle (as William Goodrich)
- Starring: Tom Patricola
- Release date: September 21, 1930
- Running time: 19 minutes
- Country: United States
- Language: English

Si Si Senor is a 1930 American comedy film directed by Fatty Arbuckle and starring Tom Patricola.

== Cast ==
- Tom Patricola
- Joe Phillips
- Chaquita de Montes
- Carmel Guerrox
