= Dixie Chene =

American actress

- Born: Ethel Marion Chene; July 31, 1894; Detroit, Michigan, US
- Died: April 30, 1972 (aged 77); Los Angeles, California, US
- Occupation(s): Actress, performer
- Spouse(s): Charles Armistead (??–1919); Eddie Mar (div.)

Ethel "Dixie" Chene was an American film actress active during Hollywood's silent era. She was primarily known for appearing in Mack Sennett's Keystone comedies.

== Biography ==
Chene was born in Detroit, Michigan, to Cyrus Chene and Catherine Bostwick. The family relocated to Los Angeles when Dixie was young, and as a teenager, she began performing with her older sister, fellow actress/performer Hazel Chene, as part of a vaudeville act.

Around 1912, Chene started acting in motion pictures for Universal; later on, she would gain notoriety for her roles in Keystone comedies opposite Charles Murray. After 1915, however, she returned to her career on the stage.

Chene was married at least twice: first to stuntman Charles Armistead, who died in 1919 while serving in World War I, and later to actor Eddie Mar (real name Edward Maire). Chene and Mar had a son, Robert, before eventually divorcing.

== Selected filmography ==
- 1915, Hogan's Wild Oats, (short)
- 1915, The Great Vacuum Robbery, (short)
- 1915, A Game Old Knight, (short)
- 1915, No One to Guide Him, (short)
- 1915, Mabel Lost and Won, (short)
- 1915, Those College Girls, (short)
- 1915, He Wouldn't Stay Down, (short)
- 1915, Their Social Splash, (short)
- 1915, Ambrose's Nasty Temper, (short)
- 1915, Droppington's Family Tree, (short)
- 1915, Fatty's Faithful Fido, (short)
- 1915, Willful Ambrose, (short)
- 1915, A Lucky Leap, (short)
- 1915, Giddy, Gay, and Ticklish, (short)
- 1914, Gussle, the Golfer, (short)
- 1914, Fatty's Magic Pants, (short)
- 1914, Ambrose's First Falsehood, (short)
- 1914, Leading Lizzie Astray, (short)
- 1914, The Noise of Bombs, (short)
- 1914, Tillie's Punctured Romance
- 1914, His Talented Wife, (short)
- 1914, Cursed by His Beauty, (short)
- 1914, Gentlemen of Nerve, (short)
- 1914, Killing Horace, (short)
- 1914, The Rounders, (short)
- 1914/I, The Masquerader, (short)
- 1914, The Property Man, (short)
- 1914, The Great Toe Mystery, (short)
- 1914, Mabel's New Job, (short)
- 1914, Mabel's Married Life (Short)
