= Mabel's Wilful Way =

1915 film

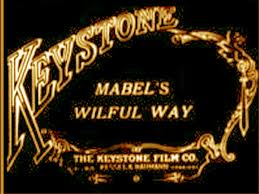
- Title card
- Directed by: Fatty Arbuckle
- Produced by: Mack Sennett
- Starring: Mabel Normand; Fatty Arbuckle
- Production company: Keystone Studios
- Distributed by: Mutual Film
- Release date: May 1, 1915
- Running time: 11 minutes
- Country: United States
- Languages: Silent; English intertitles

Mabel's Wilful Way is a 1915 American short comedy film directed by Roscoe Arbuckle, starring Mabel Normand and Fatty Arbuckle.

== Cast ==
The cast included:

- Mabel Normand: Mabel
- Roscoe "Fatty" Arbuckle: Fatty
- Edgar Kennedy: His Pal
- Alice Davenport: Mabel's Mom
- Glen Cavender: Mabel's Dad
- Joe Bordeaux: Cop
- Bobby Dunn: Ice Cream Vendor
- Billy Gilbert: Blackface Man in Sideshow Game
- James Leslie: Man Eating Pie

== See also ==
- Fatty Arbuckle filmography
