= The Movies (film) =

1925 film

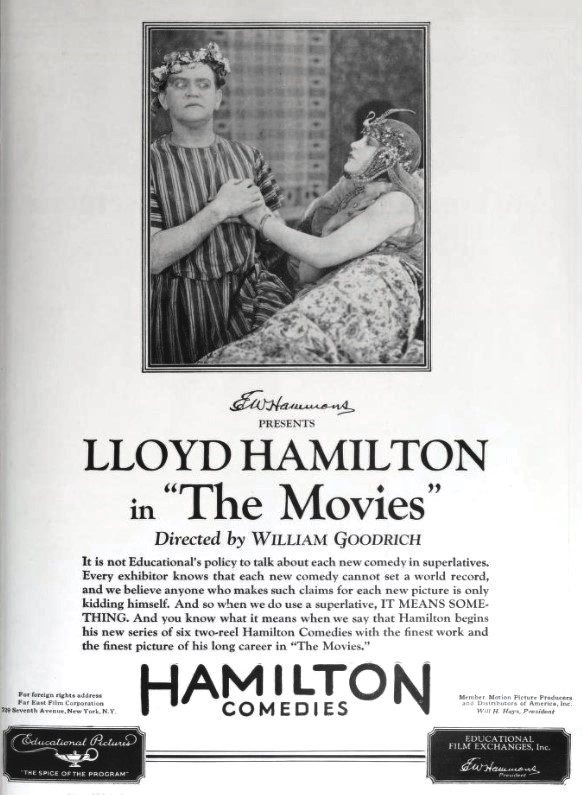
- Advertisement
- Directed by: William Goodrich (Roscoe Arbuckle)
- Written by: William Goodrich (Roscoe Arbuckle)
- Produced by: E. W. Hammons; Lloyd Hamilton; Uncredited: Buster Keaton
- Starring: Lloyd Hamilton
- Cinematography: Byron Houck
- Distributed by: Educational Film Exchanges, Inc.
- Release date: October 4, 1925
- Running time: 20 minutes
- Country: United States
- Language: Silent (English intertitles)

The Movies is a 1925 American comedy film starring Lloyd Hamilton and directed by Roscoe Arbuckle, who was working under the pseudonym "William Goodrich". After a film star breaks his leg, the director replaces the actor with a country boy who resembles him.

== Cast ==
- Lloyd Hamilton as A Country Boy / Comedy Film Star
- Marcella Daly as An Actress
- Arthur Thalasso as The Villain
- Frank Jonasson as The Director
- Glen Cavender as A Traffic Officer
- Florence Lee

== Production ==
Location scenes were filmed at the Montmarte Café on Hollywood Boulevard and the "movie" scenes at the Educational Film studios.

== Preservation ==
A print of The Movies exists and the film been released on DVD as part of a collection of Arbuckle films. Of the three films Arbuckle made with Hamilton, this is the only one that is extant.
