= Up a Tree (1930 film) =

1930 film

- Directed by: Fatty Arbuckle (as William Goodrich)
- Written by: Fatty Arbuckle (as William Goodrich); Jimmy Starr
- Produced by: Harry D. Edwards
- Starring: Lloyd Hamilton
- Distributed by: Educational Films
- Release date: November 30, 1930
- Running time: 19 minutes
- Country: United States
- Language: English

Up a Tree is a 1930 American comedy film directed by Fatty Arbuckle and starring Lloyd Hamilton. "A henpecked husband takes up tree sitting to avoid his wife's wrath."

== Cast ==
- Lloyd Hamilton
- Addie McPhail
- Dell Henderson
