= Doris Deane =

American actress (1901–1974)

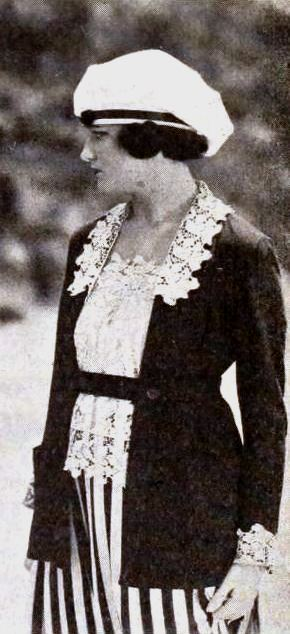
- Deane in 1921
- Born: Doris Anita Dibble; January 20, 1901; Wisconsin, U.S.
- Died: March 24, 1974 (aged 73); Hollywood, California, U.S.
- Occupation: Actress
- Years active: 1919–1950
- Spouses: Roscoe Arbuckle (m. 1925; div. 1928) Elmer S. Hartz (m. 1932; div. 1934)

Doris Anita Dibble (January 20, 1901 – March 24, 1974) was an actress who appeared in films. She supported Al St. John in comedy roles.

== Early life ==
Deane was born in 1901 in Wisconsin.

== Marriage to Roscoe Arbuckle ==
She married film director Roscoe Arbuckle May 16, 1925. The marriage followed soon after his divorce from Minta Durfee and followed the rape and manslaughter accusations against him in the death of Virginia Rappe. They planned to honeymoon in New York. They later divorced and she sued for alimony in 1929.

She and Arbuckle were guests of writer Gouverneur Morris before their marriage. She was in the 1944 play The Day Will Come.

== Career ==
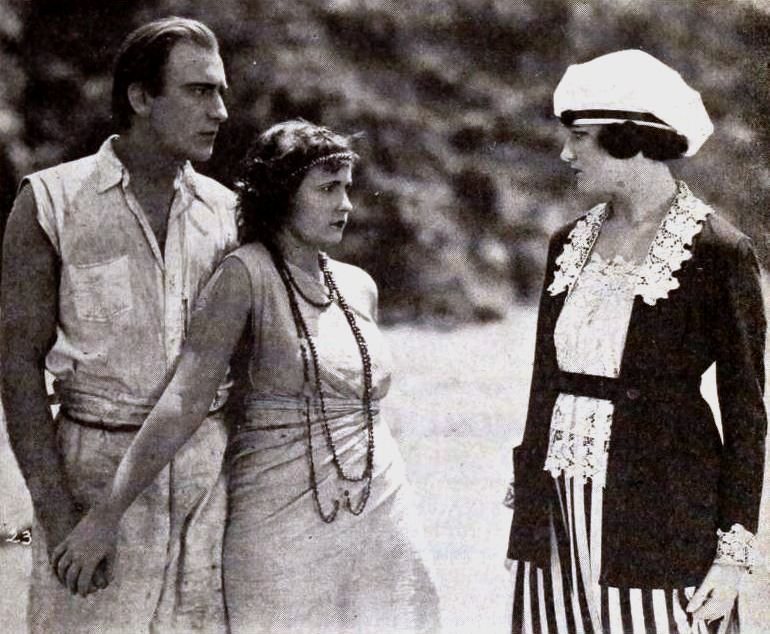
Still from The Shark Master with Frank Mayo, May Collins, and Doris Deane

Deane is included in the documentary film 4 Clowns.

== Later life ==
Deane died in Hollywood in 1974.

== Filmography ==
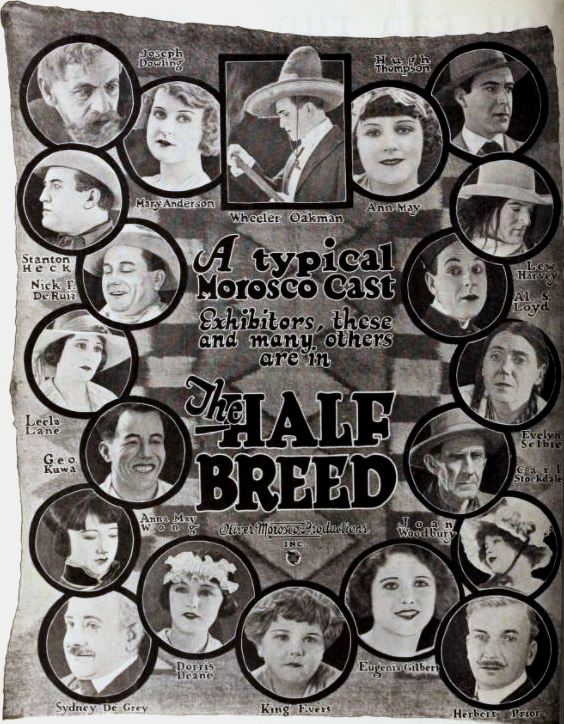
Ad for The Half Breed showing cast members

- The Secret Four (1921)
- The Shark Master (1921)
- The Half Breed (1922)
- Stupid, But Brave (1924)
- Sherlock Jr. (1924) as Girl Who Loses Dollar Outside Cinema (uncredited)
- The Iron Mule (1925)
- Seven Chances (1925)
- Marriage Rows (1931)
