= My Star =

My Star may refer to:

- "My Star" (Brainstorm song)
- "My Star" (Ian Brown song)
- My Stars, a 1926 comedy film
- MyStar, an Estonian roll-on/roll-off passenger ferry
- Oshi no Ko, a Japanese manga series
