= Paris Green (disambiguation) =

Paris green is a pigment.

Paris green or Paris Green may also refer to:

- Paris Green (film), a 1920 American silent film
- "Paris Green" (Boardwalk Empire), an episode of the television series Boardwalk Empire
