= His Private Life =

His Private Life may refer to:

- His Private Life (1926 film), an American silent comedy short starring Lupino Lane
- His Private Life (1928 film), an American silent comedy starring Adolphe Menjou
