= The Shark Master =

1921 film

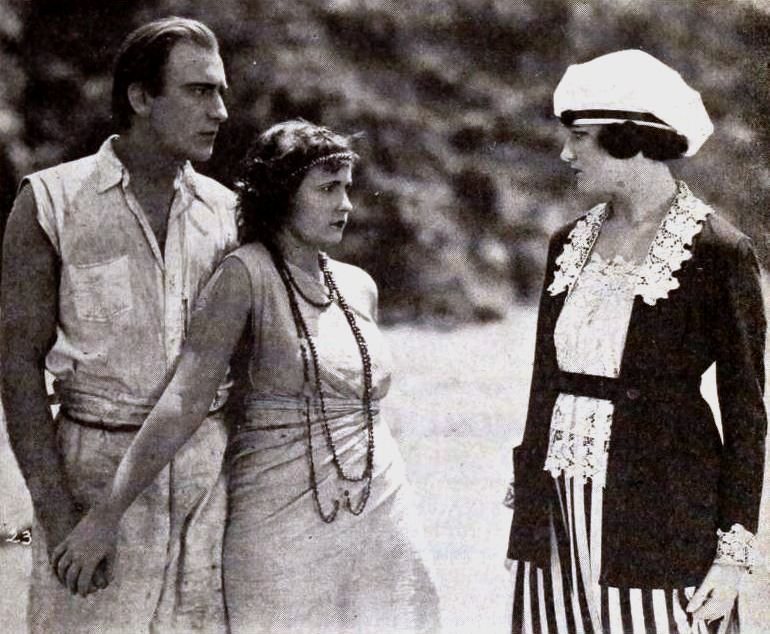
- Still with Frank Mayo, May Collins, and Doris Deane
- Directed by: Fred LeRoy Granville
- Screenplay by: George C. Hull; Fred LeRoy Granville
- Starring: Frank Mayo; Doris Deane; Herbert Fortier; Oliver Cross; May Collins; Bowditch M. Turner
- Cinematography: Leland Lancaster
- Production company: Universal Film Manufacturing Company
- Distributed by: Universal Film Manufacturing Company
- Release date: August 28, 1921
- Running time: 50 minutes
- Country: United States
- Language: Silent (English intertitles)

The Shark Master is a 1921 American silent drama film directed by Fred LeRoy Granville and written by George C. Hull and Fred LeRoy Granville. The film stars Frank Mayo, Doris Deane, Herbert Fortier, Oliver Cross, May Collins, and Bowditch M. Turner. The film was released on August 28, 1921, by Universal Film Manufacturing Company. Prints of The Shark Master exist in the Library of Congress film archive and in the EYE Institut Filmmuseum film archive.

== Cast ==
- Frank Mayo as McLeod Dean
- Doris Deane as June Marstoon
- Herbert Fortier as Captain Marston
- Oliver Cross as Donaldson
- May Collins as Flame Flower
- Bowditch M. Turner as Native Priest
- Nick De Ruiz as Native Chief
- Karl Silvera as Moto
