= A Clever Dummy =

1917 silent short film

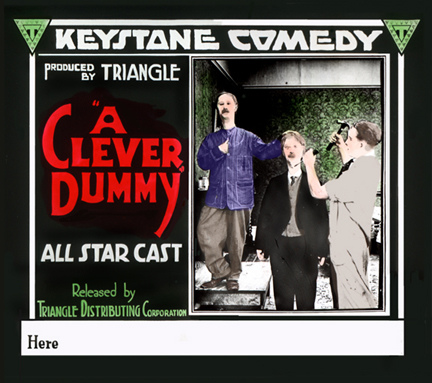
- Directed by: Ferris Hartman; Robert P. Kerr; Herman C. Raymaker; Mack Sennett
- Written by: Mack Sennett
- Produced by: Mack Sennett
- Starring: Ben Turpin
- Cinematography: Elgin Lessley
- Production company: Keystone Studios
- Distributed by: Triangle Film Corporation
- Release date: June 28, 1917
- Running time: 23 minutes
- Country: United States
- Language: Silent (English intertitles)

A Clever Dummy is a 1917 American short comedy film directed by Ferris Hartman, Robert P. Kerr, Herman C. Raymaker, and Mack Sennett.

== Plot ==
Ben Turpin is a janitor who is in love with an inventor's daughter, and is used as a model for the inventor's new mechanical dummy. To be near to her, he hides inside the dummy's case and is shipped off to a vaudeville company. He has to stay in character as the dummy, which he succeeds at. The property master stores him in Juanita Hansen's dressing room, where he steals a wad of bills, and a chase ensues.

== Cast ==
- Ben Turpin as A romantic janitor
- Chester Conklin as A playful property man
- Wallace Beery as A vaudeville manager
- Juanita Hansen as A leading lady
- Claire Anderson as An object of affection
- James Donnelly as Her inventive father
- James Delano as His interested partner
- Joseph Belmont as Bald Husband in Audience (uncredited)
- Robert Milliken as Master of Ceremonies (uncredited)
- Marvel Rea (Minor Role) (uncredited)
- Eva Thatcher as Wife in Audience (uncredited)
