= Laura La Varnie =

American actress

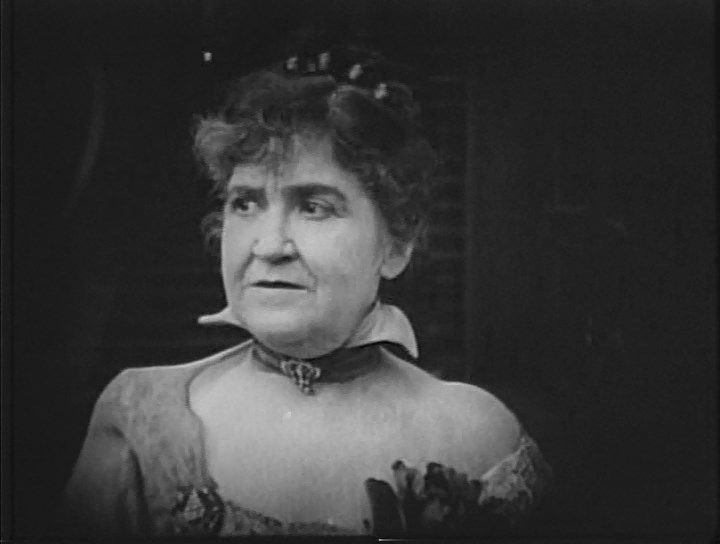
- Born: March 2, 1853; Jefferson City, Missouri, US
- Died: September 18, 1939 (aged 86); Los Angeles, California, US
- Occupation: Actress
- Years active: 1913–1930

Laura La Varnie (March 2, 1853 – September 18, 1939) was an American actress of the silent era. She appeared in more than 80 films between 1913 and 1930. She was born in Jefferson City, Missouri and died in Los Angeles, California.

== Selected filmography ==
Her First Kiss (1919)

- Lord Chumley (1914)
- The Pullman Bride (1917)
- Are Waitresses Safe? (1917)
- Mickey (1918)
- The Unpainted Woman (1919)
- The Grim Comedian (1921)
- Skirts (1921)
- The Old Nest (1921) as Mrs. Guthrie
- The Marriage Chance (1922)
- Vanity Fair (1923)
- Mine to Keep (1923)
- The Love Trap (1923)
- The Self-Made Wife (1923)
- Poisoned Paradise: The Forbidden Story of Monte Carlo (1924)
- The Bells (1926)
- Raggedy Rose (1926) - her mother
- The Honorable Mr. Buggs (1927)
- The Devil's Holiday (1930)
