= George Davis (actor) =

American actor (1889–1965)

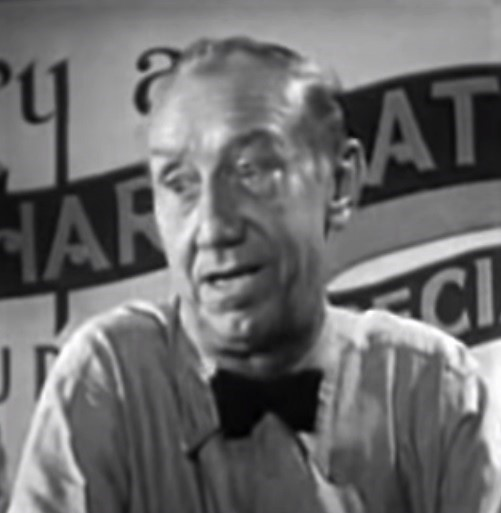
- George Davis in The Lady Says No (1952)
- Born: 7 November 1889; Amsterdam, Netherlands
- Died: 19 April 1965 (aged 75); Los Angeles, California, U.S.
- Occupation: Actor
- Years active: 1916–1963

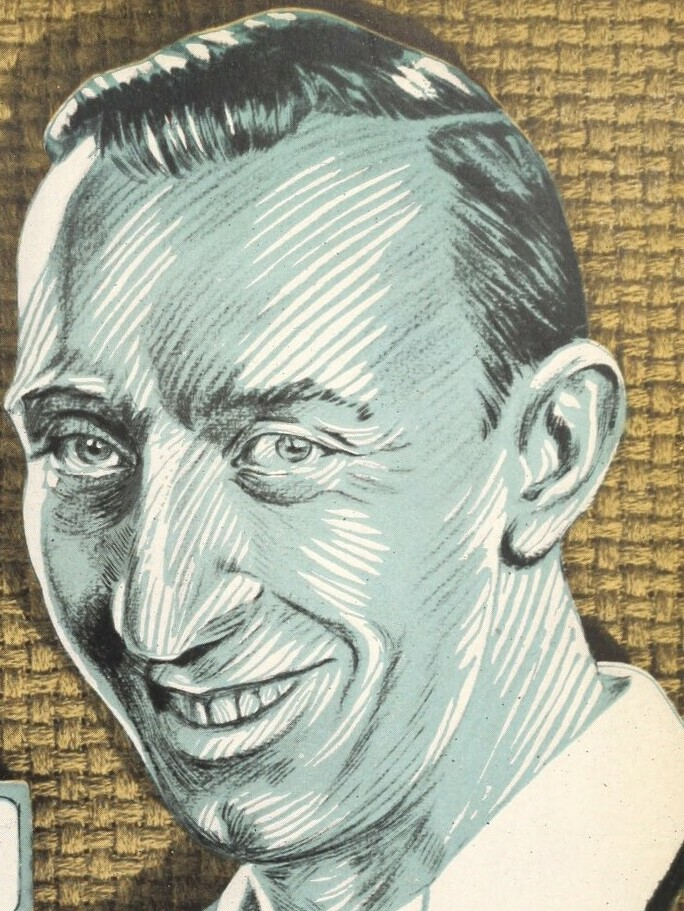
George Davis (actor) art in Educational Pictures advertisement from 1926 Motion Picture News

George Davis (7 November 1889 – 19 April 1965) was a Dutch-born American actor. He appeared in more than 260 films between 1916 and 1963. He was born in Amsterdam and died in Los Angeles, California, from cancer.

== Selected filmography ==
- The Yellow Traffic (1914)
- Out of the Fog (1919) as Brad Standish
- Three Ages (1923) as Roman Guard Knocked Down (uncredited)
- Sherlock Jr. (1924) as Conspirator (uncredited)
- Stupid, But Brave (1924, short) as A Bum / The Race Starter (uncredited)
- He Who Gets Slapped (1924) as A Clown (uncredited)
- The Iron Mule (1925, short)
- The Phantom of the Opera (1925) as Guard at Christine's Door (uncredited)
- The Tourist (1925, short)
- Cleaning Up (1925, short) as The Wife's Brother
- The Fighting Dude (1925, short) as The Dude's Valet
- My Stars (1926, short) as The Butler
- Home Cured (1926, short)
- Fool's Luck (1926, short) as Cuthbert, The Valet
- His Private Life (1926 short) as His Valet
- Into Her Kingdom (1926) as Russian Officer / Court Leader
- The Magic Flame (1927) as The Utility Man
- The Circus (1928) as A Magician
- The Wagon Show (1928) as Hank
- 4 Devils (1928) as Mean Clown
- The Awakening (1928) as The Orderly
- Sin Sister (1929)
- Broadway (1929) as Joe the Waiter
- The Kiss (1929) as Detective Durant
- Devil-May-Care (1929) as Groom
- Not So Dumb (1930)
- Laugh and Get Rich (1931)
- The Big Trail (1931)
- The Little Cafe (1931)
- Strangers May Kiss (1931)
- The Common Law (1931)
- Men of Chance (1931)
- Keep Laughing (1932)
- The Man from Yesterday (1932)
- Under Cover Man (1932)
- Private Lives (1933)
- Reunion in Vienna (1933)
- The Merry Widow (1934) French version
- I Met Him in Paris (1937)
- Everything Happens at Night (1939)
- Charlie Chan in City in Darkness (1939)
- Ninotchka (1939) as Porter at Railroad Station (uncredited)
- The Pied Piper (1942)
- Bomber's Moon (1943) (uncredited)
- The Dolly Sisters (1945)
- In a Lonely Place (1950) as Waiter (uncredited)
- Secrets of Monte Carlo (1951)
- The Lady Says No (1952)
