= Are Waitresses Safe? =

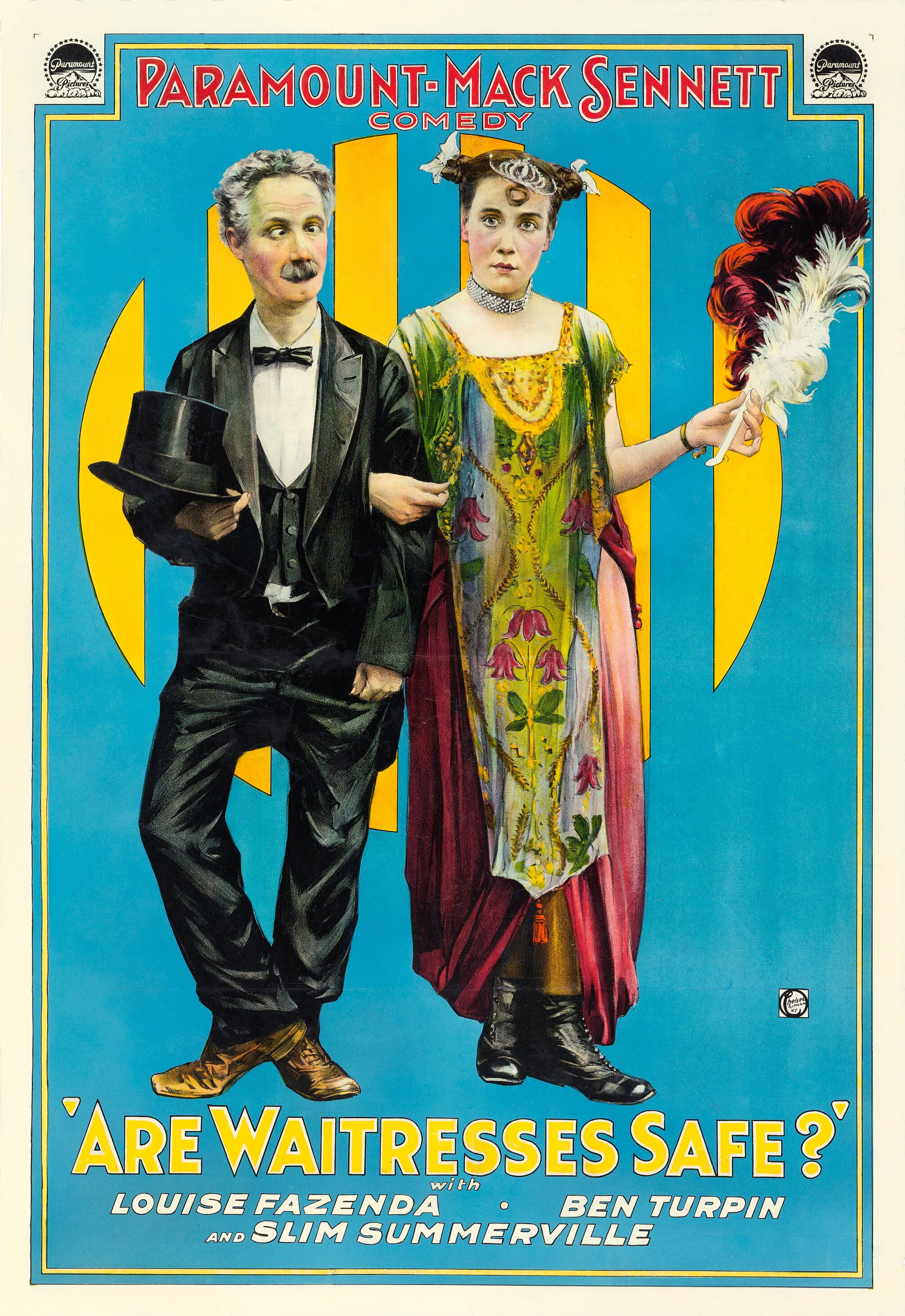
- Theatrical release poster
- Directed by: Victor Heerman; Hampton Del Ruth
- Written by: Charles Murray
- Produced by: Mack Sennett Productions
- Starring: Louise Fazenda; Ben Turpin
- Cinematography: Fred Jackman
- Distributed by: Paramount Pictures
- Release date: November 18, 1917
- Running time: 2 reels
- Country: United States
- Language: Silent (English intertitles)

Are Waitresses Safe? is a 1917 American silent comedy short film starring Louise Fazenda and Ben Turpin. It was produced by Mack Sennett. The film was possibly rereleased in 1923.

The film is preserved in the Library of Congress.

== Cast ==
- Louise Fazenda as A Working Girl
- Ben Turpin as Ralph
- Slim Summerville as Gang Leader Rival
- Glen Cavender as Chef
- Wayland Trask Jr. as Frustrated Customer
- Anthony O'Sullivan
- Jack Cooper as Steady Customer
- Al McKinnon as The Steady Customer's Pal
- Erle C. Kenton as Restaurant Owner
- Gene Rogers as The Mansion Owner
- Teddy the Dog as Teddy
- Pepper the Cat as Pepper

guests/uncredited

- Hal Haig Prieste
- Wallace Beery
- Cliff Bowes
- Bobby Dunn
- Gonda Durand
- Ted Edwards
- Elinor Field
- Harry Gribbon
- Phyllis Haver
- Tom Kennedy
- Laura La Varnie
- Grover Ligon
- Hughie Mack
- Roxana McGowan
- Marvel Rea
- Vera Steadman
