= The Half Breed (1922 film) =

1922 film

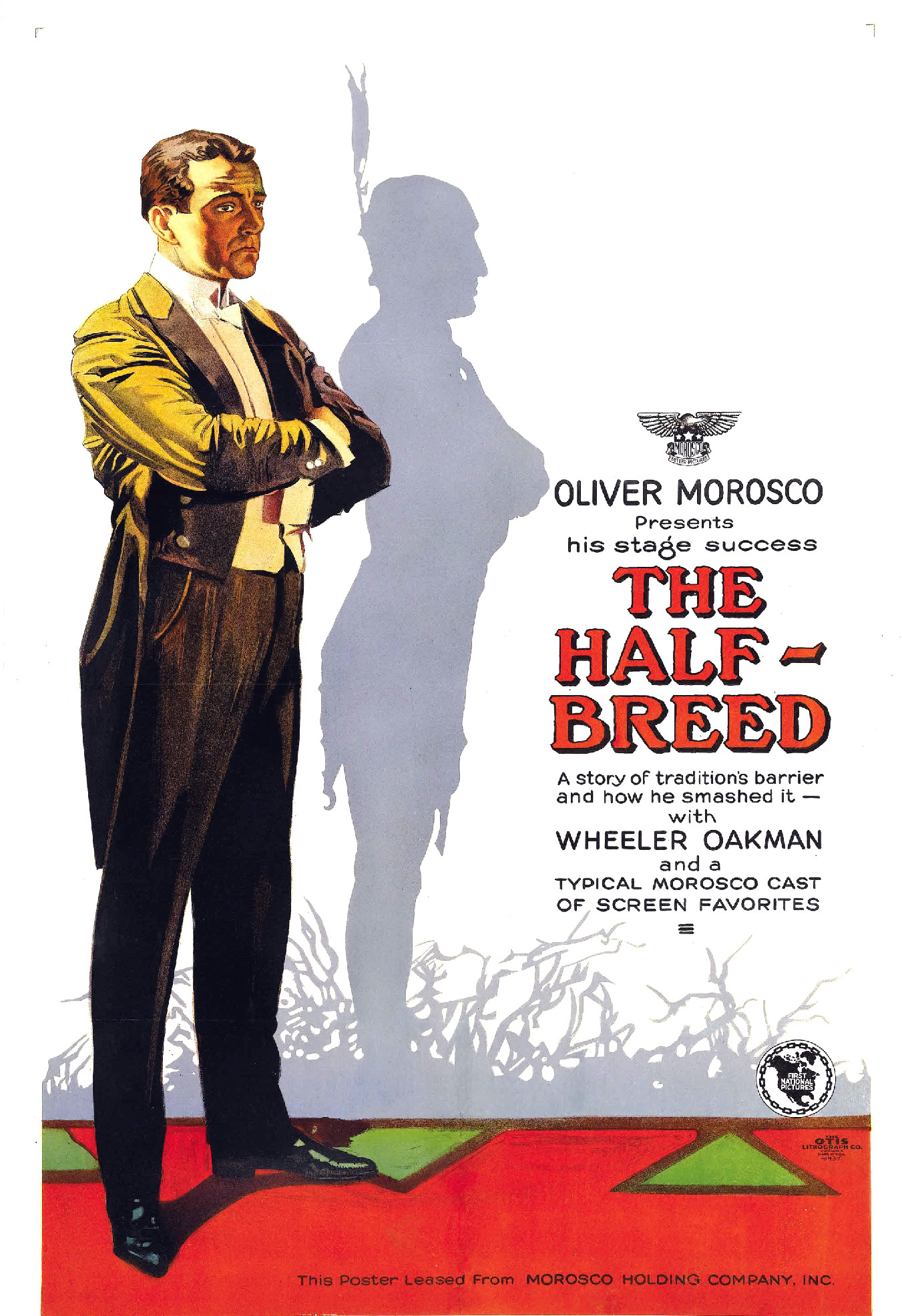
- Directed by: Charles A. Taylor
- Written by: H.D. Cottrell; Oliver Morosco; Charles A. Taylor
- Produced by: Oliver Morosco
- Starring: Wheeler Oakman; Ann May; Mary Anderson
- Cinematography: Charles G. Clarke; James C. Hutchinson
- Edited by: Elmer J. McGovern
- Production company: Oliver Morosco Productions
- Distributed by: Associated First National Pictures
- Release date: June 1922
- Running time: 60 minutes
- Country: United States
- Languages: Silent; English intertitles

The Half Breed is a 1922 American silent Western film directed by Charles A. Taylor and starring Wheeler Oakman, Ann May and Mary Anderson.

== Cast ==
- Wheeler Oakman as Delmar Spavinaw, the halfbreed
- Ann May as Doll Pardeau
- Mary Anderson as Evelyn Huntington
- Hugh Thompson as Ross Kennion
- King Evers as Dick Kennion
- Joseph J. Dowling as Judge Huntington
- Lew Harvey as The Snake
- Herbert Prior as Ned Greenwood
- Sidney De Gray as Leon Pardeau
- Nick De Ruiz as Juan Del Rey
- Leela Lane as Isabelle Pardeau
- Eugenia Gilbert as Marianne
- Carl Stockdale as John Spavinaw
- Evelyn Selbie as Mary
- Doris Deane as Nanette
- Albert S. Lloyd as Hops
- George Kuwa as Kito

== Bibliography ==
- Langman, Larry. American Film Cycles: The Silent Era. Greenwood Publishing, 1998.
