= The Iron Mule =

1925 film

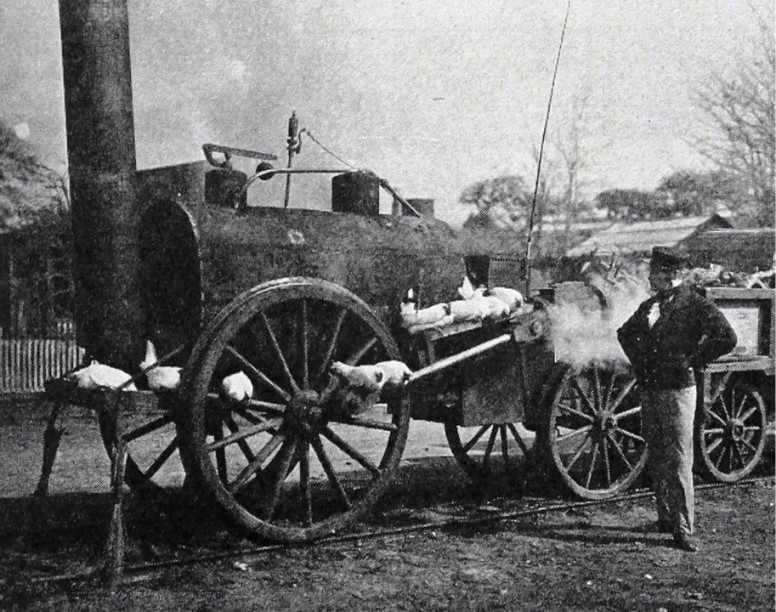
- Still from a 1925 magazine
- Directed by: William Goodrich (Roscoe Arbuckle); Grover Jones
- Written by: Grover Jones
- Produced by: Buster Keaton (uncredited)
- Starring: Al St. John
- Production company: Reel Comedies Inc.
- Distributed by: Educational Pictures
- Release date: April 12, 1925
- Running time: 24 minutes
- Country: United States
- Language: Silent (English intertitles)

The Iron Mule is a 1925 American silent comedy film directed by Roscoe Arbuckle and Grover Jones.

Full film

== Plot ==
It is 1830 in Likskillet. The Iron Mule is a steam engine used to haul converted carriages on a rail. A cow on the tracks delays their start. The driver has to take the tall funnel off for the engine to go through the low tunnel.

They reach a river.. there is no bridge...They attach logs and float over. The journey then becomes river-based for a while. They then drive on the rails all night.

The next morning cowboy ties a horse to the last carriage. The train cannot pull it. The male passengers gamble on a spinning wheel until stopped by one of the women. The train moves off without the driver or any male passenger. They chase after it.

They reach Sassafras. A group of indians put logs on the tracks and derail the engine. They start firing arrows which lodge in an open carriage door. The men arrive and the driver fights off the indians but one male passenger is chased by an indian with a tomahawk. As he runs he passes his toupee to the indian (as though it were a scalp). It reads "Genuine Unborn Plush Wig: Sears Roebuck Co.".

The engine moves off but he carriages uncouple. The passengers run after it.

== Cast ==
- Al St. John as the engine driver
- George Davis a passenger
- Glen Cavender
- Doris Deane a passenger
- Buster Keaton as Indian (uncredited)

== Preservation ==
A 35 mm print is held by the Museum of Modern Art, and a 16 mm print is held by George Eastman House.

== See also ==
- Fatty Arbuckle filmography
