= The Honorable Mr. Buggs =

1927 film

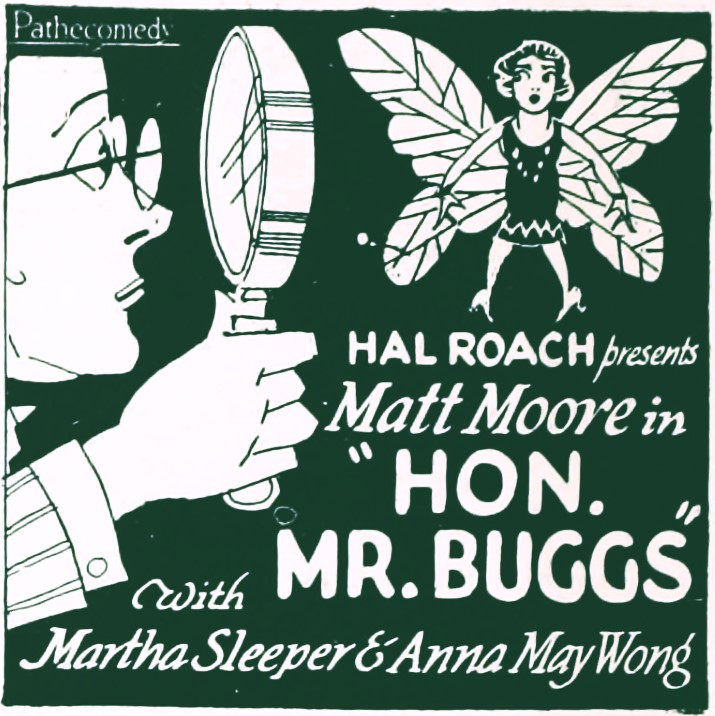
- Cornerblock advertisement
- Directed by: Fred Jackman
- Written by: Barry Barringer; Ted Burnsten; Frank Butler; Alfred J. Goulding; Stan Laurel
- Produced by: Hal Roach
- Starring: Anna May Wong; Oliver Hardy
- Cinematography: George Stevens
- Distributed by: Pathé Exchange
- Release date: April 24, 1927
- Running time: 2 reels (approx. 20 minutes)
- Country: United States
- Language: Silent (English intertitles)

The Honorable Mr. Buggs is a 1927 American silent comedy film featuring Anna May Wong and Oliver Hardy. This film is held by a private owner.

== Plot ==
Dr. Buggs, a bachelor and collector of bugs, is engaged to be married. A beautiful woman, the Baroness Stoloff, wanted by the police for the theft of a royal ruby, calls on Buggs with a rare specimen. While the titled crook is there, Buggs' fiancée and her aunt call and, suspecting that all is not right, the aunt starts to snoop and finds her suspicions justified.As she does so, the police arrive on scene - a wild scramble follows and in the end the Baroness is arrested and Buggs' fiancée, enlightened by his story, forgives her jealous outburst and happiness again reigns.

== Cast ==
- Matt Moore as Mr. Buggs
- Anna May Wong as Baroness Stoloff
- Sōjin Kamiyama as A crook
- Oliver Hardy as Butler
- Martha Sleeper as The fiancée
- Laura La Varnie
- Tyler Brooke
- Priscilla Dean
- James Finlayson

== See also ==
- List of American films of 1927
- Oliver Hardy filmography
