= Home Cured =

1926 film

- Directed by: William Goodrich (Roscoe Arbuckle)
- Written by: Donna Barrell
- Starring: Johnny Arthur
- Cinematography: Byron Houck
- Production company: Goodwill Productions (as Tuxedo Comedies)
- Distributed by: Educational Film Exchanges
- Release date: March 14, 1926
- Running time: 11 minutes
- Country: United States
- Language: Silent (English intertitles)

Home Cured is a 1926 American silent short comedy film directed by Roscoe Arbuckle. Although Arbuckle was acquitted in the third trial for the death of Virginia Rappe, he could not obtain work in Hollywood under his own name, so he adopted the pseudonym William Goodrich for directing the comedy shorts he made under his contract with Educational Film Exchanges.

== Plot ==
As described in a film magazine review, a man who is always buying medicine for his imaginary ailments is put through a cure by his wife and his friend. He pretends he really is ill. Doctors, undertakers, and the sexton arrive and the wife and friend plan how they will spend his insurance money. The husband realizes they are trying to get rid of him. He chases his friend from the house, promising his wife he will not be sick again.

== Cast ==
- Johnny Arthur as The Hypochondriac
- Virginia Vance as The Hypochondriac's Wife
- Chick Collins as Hypochondriac's Friend
- George Davis as The Nurse
- Glen Cavender as The Doctor
- Robert Brower
- Walter C. Reed

== Preservation ==
An incomplete 16 mm copy is held by George Eastman House.

== See also ==
- Fatty Arbuckle filmography
