= The Tourist (1925 film) =

1925 film

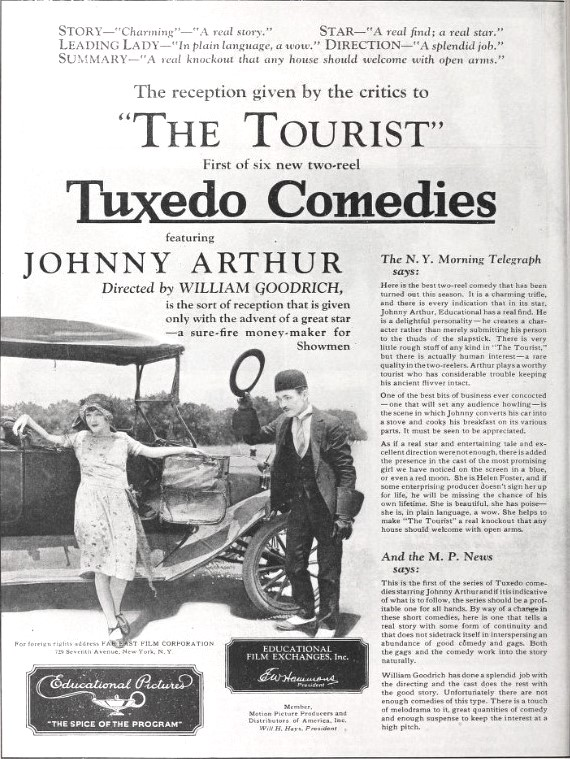
- Advertisement
- Directed by: Fatty Arbuckle (as William Goodrich)
- Starring: Johnny Arthur
- Cinematography: Byron Houck
- Production company: Goodwill Productions
- Distributed by: Educational Film Exchanges
- Release date: September 20, 1925
- Running time: 2 reels
- Country: United States
- Language: Silent (English intertitles)

The Tourist is a 1925 American silent comedy film directed by Fatty Arbuckle.

== Cast ==
- Johnny Arthur as The Tourist
- Helen Foster as Helen, The Girl
- Joy Winthrop as Helen's Mother
- Glen Cavender as First Crook
- George Davis as Second Crook
