= Wayland Trask Jr. =

American actor and silent film comedian

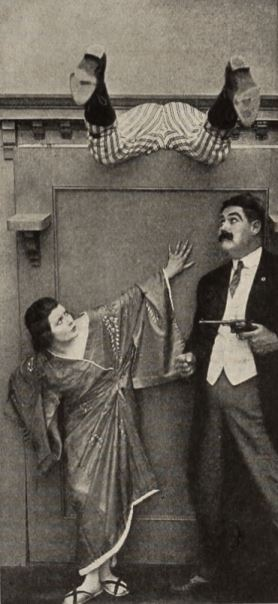
- Mary Thurman and Trask in A Bedroom Blunder (1917)
- Born: July 16, 1887; New York City, New York
- Died: November 18, 1918 (aged 31); Los Angeles, California
- Resting place: Angelus-Rosedale Cemetery, Los Angeles
- Occupations: Actor, Comedian
- Years active: 1910-1918

Wayland Trask Jr. (July 16, 1887 - November 18, 1918) was a silent film comedian who was a member of Mack Sennett's stock company of actors. Trask also had a theatrical background appearing in at least two Broadway plays before turning to screen comedy. He died at the end of 1918 in the Spanish Influenza pandemic eleven months after the disease had taken his mother. Trask's father was a stockbroker who died in 1905. Trask also had two sisters. In looks he was tall like Chaplin's co-star Eric Campbell and resembled the later Sennett comedian Kewpie Morgan. Some of his performances in Sennett comedies survive such as Bombs (a.k.a. Bombs and Brides).

== Partial filmography ==
- A Game Old Knight (1915)
- The Great Vacuum Robbery (1915)
- Fatty and the Broadway Stars (1915)
- The Feathered Nest (1916)
- The Great Pearl Tangle (1916)
- Fatty and Mabel Adrift (1916)
- A Movie Star (1916)
- Fido's Fate (1916)
- His Hereafter (1916)
- His Auto Fruination (1916)
- The Judge (1916)
- A Love Riot (1916)
- By Stork Delivery (1916)
- His Bread and Butter (1916)
- Cactus Nell (1917)
- The Pullman Bride (1917)
- Are Waitresses Safe? (1917)
- Watch Your Neighbor (1918)
