= Marvel Rea =

American actress

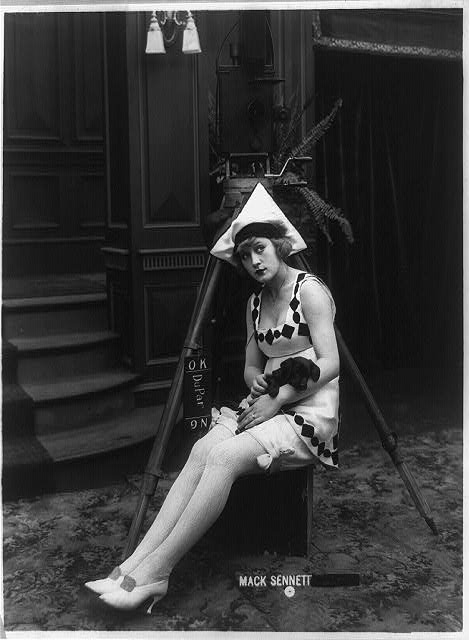
- Rea in c.1919
- Born: Marvel Luciel Rea; November 9, 1901; Ainsworth, Nebraska, U.S.
- Died: June 17, 1937 (aged 35); Los Angeles, California, U.S.
- Occupation: Actress
- Years active: 1917–1932
- Spouse(s): Henry Page Wells (1918–1922); Edwin J. Wilkinson (m.1936)

Marvel Rea (November 9, 1901 – June 17, 1937) was an American silent film actress best known for her work beside Ford Sterling. She was one of Mack Sennett's "Bathing Beauties".

== Early life ==
Marvel Luciel Rea was the third of four children born to Thomas John Rea and Nellie Mae Thurman. Rea's family moved from Nebraska to California in 1910. She entered silent films in 1918 joining the Keystone Film Company and becoming one of the Sennett Bathing Beauties. Her brother Thomas Rea would later enter film as well.

== Film comedian ==
Rea was in Her Screen Idol (1918) with Ford Sterling and Louise Fazenda. The movie was a humorous satire on the matinee idol of motion pictures. Sennett displayed the technique of illustrating a play within a play in this production.

Rea was in movies from 1917 through 1921. Among her more than twenty-five screen credits are roles in A Clever Dummy (1917), The Summer Girls (1918), East Lynne with Variations (1919), When Love Is Blind (1919), A Lightweight Lover (1920), The Simp (1920), and For Land's Sake (1920). Her death certificate lists her as an actress with the Fox Film Corporation up until 1932.

== Marriages ==
Rea was married to Henry Page Wells on October 25, 1918. They separated in November. About two weeks after their wedding Rea said that Page stood her on her head. The accusation was part of a divorce suit which Rea brought in August 1922. She accused her husband of spending most of his $800 per month salary on narcotics.

She later became engaged to Edwin J. Wilkinson in August 1936 right before her assault. They married on an unknown date and remained married until her death.

== Attack ==
On September 2, 1936, while Rea was walking near 107th Street and Compton Avenue in Los Angeles, California, three young men offered to take her to her home in East 107th Street. When she refused, they attacked Rea, threw her into a large red truck, and transported her to a eucalyptus grove at 120th Street and Compton Avenue, South Los Angeles. She was thrown to the ground, beaten and assaulted with glass bottles. She was then raped by each of the men in turn. During the attack, Rea suffered a seizure and was left by the men semiconscious. It took her four hours to recover enough to get help.

The three suspects were apprehended and questioned by Los Angeles Police Department, and were arrested on suspicion of kidnapping and attack, though they all denied their charges. In January 1937, the three young truck drivers unsuccessfully requested a new trial on charges that they attacked Rea. They gave oral notice of appeal in Los Angeles Superior Court Judge Frank M. Smith's court. The three were sentenced to prison terms of from one to fifty years. In 1939, the three men were released from prison on technicalities regarding their trials, after serving only three years.

== Death ==
Rea committed suicide by ingesting ant paste. She died on June 17, 1937, in Los Angeles. She is buried at Pacific Crest Cemetery in Redondo Beach, California with her family. Her death certificate lists her as Marvel L. Wilkinson but she is buried under the name Marvel Luciel Rea.

== Partial filmography ==
- Whose Baby? (1917)
- A Clever Dummy (1917)
- The Pullman Bride (1917)
- Are Waitresses Safe? (1917)
