= Virginia Vance =

American silent film actress

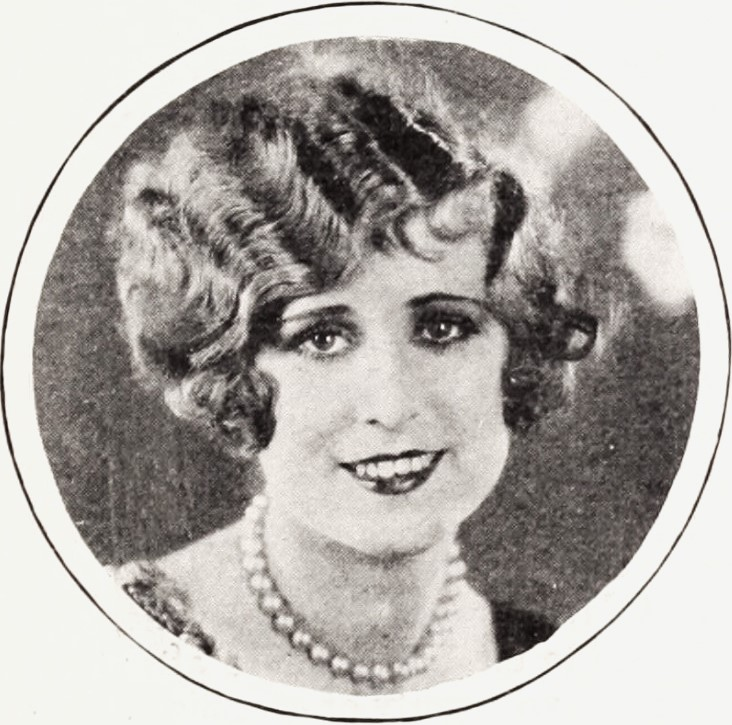
From a 1926 publication

Virginia Vance (born Dahlie Pears; July 1, 1902 – October 13, 1942) was a silent film actress in the United States. She married actor Bryant Washburn.

== Biography ==
Vance was born Dahlie Pears in Chicago and raised in Toronto, Canada. She appeared in some 90 films including comedy shorts, serials, and features including in leading roles. She appeared in Cameo Comedies with Cliff Bowes. She is knocked over by a custard pie in the 1926 film His Private Life.

In 1929 she married and left filmmaking. She had a daughter. She died of heart issues and is buried at Chapel in the Pines cemetery in Los Angeles.

== Filmography ==
- Goat Getter (1925) as Mamie Arthur
- Cheer Up (1924)
- The Fighting Dude (1925)
- What's Up? (1925)
- Fool's Luck (1926)
- Home Cured (1926)
- The Fighting Marine (1926) as Ruby
- His Private Life (1926)
- My Stars (1926) as The Girl
- Undressed (1928) as Marjorie Stanley
- New Year's Eve as Little Girl's Mother
