= Clem Beauchamp =

American actor

Clement Hoyt "Clem" Beauchamp
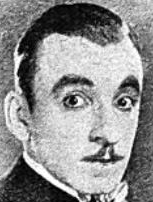
- As Jerry Drew in 1929
- Born: August 26, 1898; Bloomfield, Iowa, US
- Died: November 14, 1992 (aged 94); Santa Rosa, California, US
- Other name: Jerry Drew
- Occupations: Film actor, director
- Spouses: Anita Garvin (m. 1926; div. 1930) Sydney Hein (m. 1935)

Clement Hoyt "Clem" Beauchamp (August 26, 1898 – November 14, 1992), also known as Jerry Drew in his acting career during the 1920s and 1930s, first worked as a second unit director in 1935, netting the Academy Award for Best Assistant Director for his work on The Lives of a Bengal Lancer. He was nominated in the same category the following year for The Last of the Mohicans.

== Biography ==
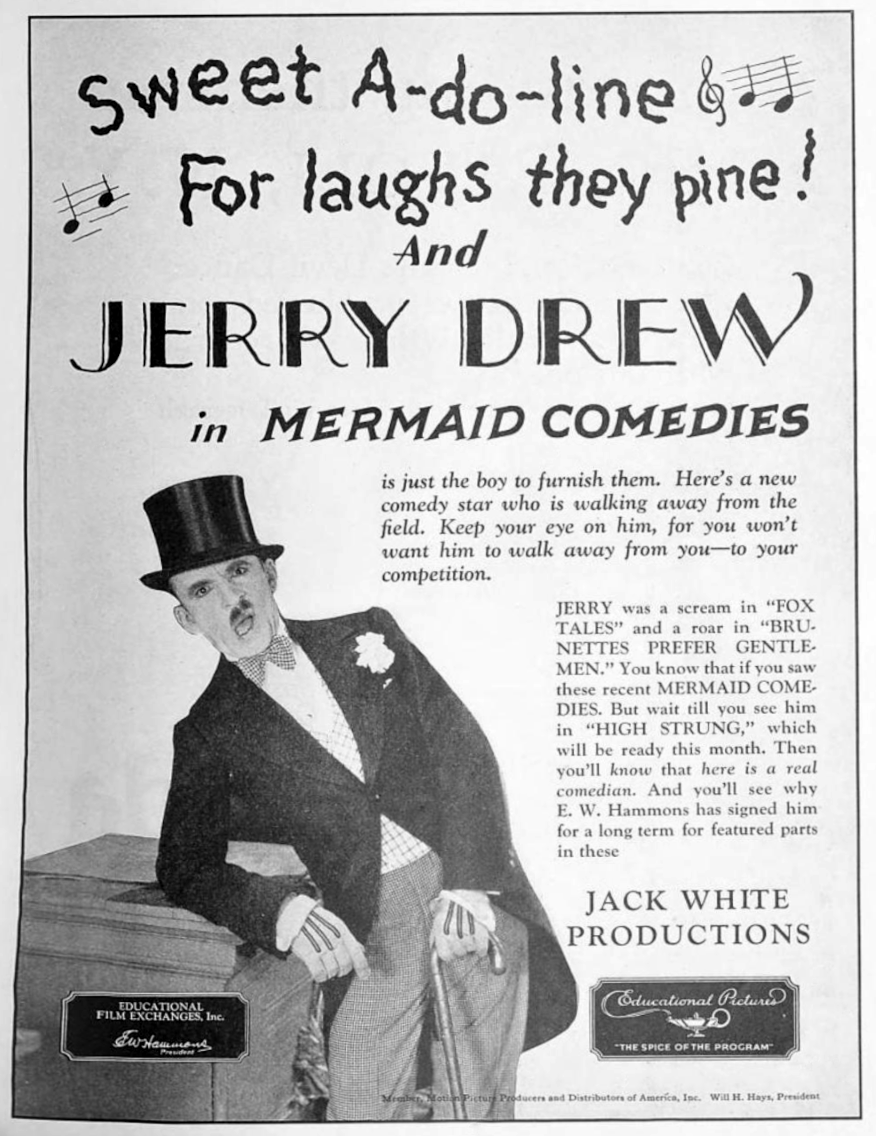
1928 ad for Beauchamp, as Jerry Drew, in Mermaid Comedies

Born in Bloomfield, Iowa, Beauchamp was one of two sons of Charles and Ula Beauchamp. His father was a druggist. The family later moved to Denver, Colorado and then to Fort Worth, Texas. After his parents divorced, his mother took her sons to Los Angeles, California where Beauchamp started working in motion pictures at age 16 as a stuntman. His first known film is Stupid, But Brave. He would later appear in The Painted Desert, sharing screen time with Clark Gable and William Boyd. In 1933, he appeared in the W.C. Fields comedy International House, in a non-credited part as a newsreel cameraman.

From 1926 to 1930, Beauchamp was married to actress and comedian Anita Garvin, who is best remembered for the 11 films she made with comedians Laurel and Hardy. In 1935, he married script girl Sydney Hein.

He went on to work on several Tarzan and Dick Tracy movies, eventually becoming a production manager. In this capacity, he worked on such films as Fred Zinnemann's The Men (1950) and High Noon (1952), Death of a Salesman (1951) and Stanley Kramer's The Defiant Ones (1958), Judgment at Nuremberg (1961) and It's a Mad, Mad, Mad, Mad World (1963). He later worked on Blake Edwards' The Great Race (1965) and William A. Graham's Waterhole No. 3 (1967). He was also the production manager on The Adventures of Superman television series, starring George Reeves.

Beauchamp told The Literary Digest his name was pronounced "Bo-shawm, both syllables accented alike." (Charles Earle Funk, What's the Name, Please?, Funk & Wagnalls, 1936.)

He died in Santa Rosa, California on November 14, 1992.

== Selected filmography ==
- Painted Faces (1929)
