= Glen Cavender =

American actor (1883–1962)

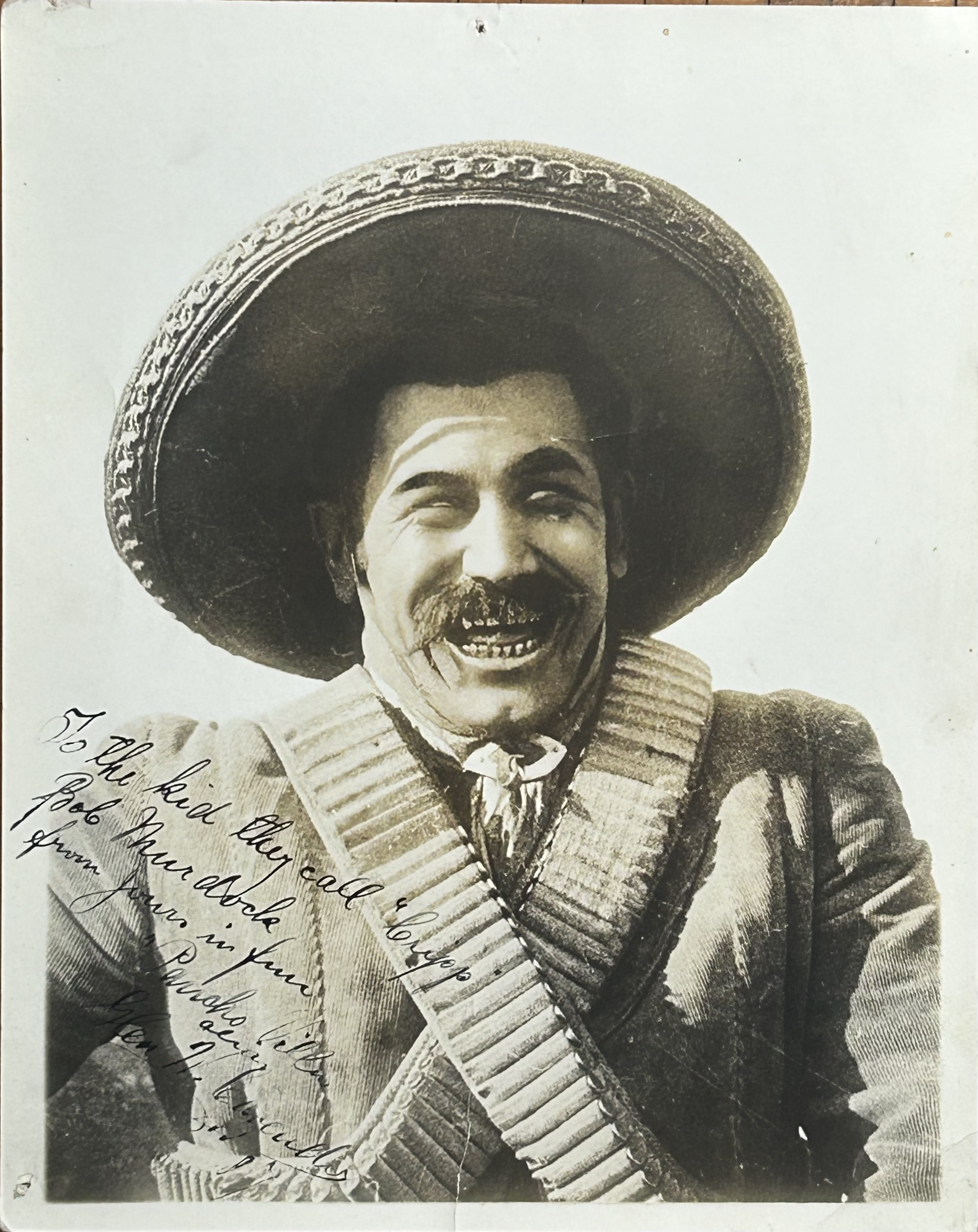
- As Pancho Villa
- Born: Glenn W. Cavender; September 19, 1883; Tucson, Arizona, U.S.
- Died: February 9, 1962 (aged 78); Hollywood, Los Angeles, California, U.S.
- Occupation: Actor
- Years active: 1914–1949
- Spouse: Hazel Chene

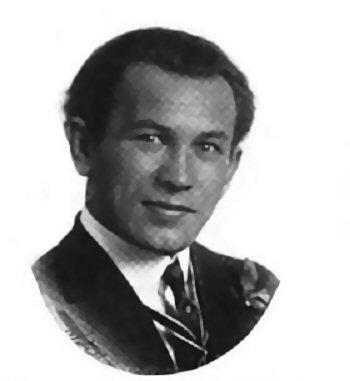
Who's Who in the Film World, 1914

Glen W. Cavender (September 19, 1883 – February 9, 1962) was an American film actor. He appeared in more than 250 films between 1914 and 1949.

== Biography ==
Glen Cavender was born on September 19, 1883, or on September 19, 1879, in Tucson, Arizona. After studying at a military school he became a non-commissioned officer in the United States Army. He toured with Buffalo Bill's Wild West Show and rode with Theodore Roosevelt and the Rough Riders.

Cavender began working in films with the Frontier Company in 1910, after which he worked for Bison 101 Company, Kay-Bee, Broncho, and Kalem before going to Keystone. He started in vaudeville shows in 1912. Cavender belonged to the original Keystone Cops and was a regular in numerous Mack Sennett comedies. He also worked as a director for three Mack Sennett films between 1914 and 1916. During the 1920s, Cavender worked for the film studios Educational and Christie and appeared in Buster Keaton's film classic The General (1926) as the antagonistic Union Captain Anderson. The advance of sound film in the late 1920s damaged his career and, formerly a well-known actor, Cavender only played minor roles until his retirement in 1949.

On August 28, 1921, Cavender and three other people were injured when a gasoline stove exploded. During preparation of dinner at a picnic on Ventura Beach, gasoline leaked from the stove and caught fire. The resulting explosion cast burning fuel "over the bare backs, shoulders and limbs" of people on one side of the stove. Cavender was the most seriously injured, with burns over most of his body.

Cavender was married to actress Hazel Chene. He died in Hollywood, California.

== Selected filmography ==
- Cruel, Cruel Love (1914, Short) - Bearded Doctor (uncredited)
- Dough and Dynamite (1914, Short) - Head Striking Baker
- Tillie's Punctured Romance (1914) - 1st Pianist in restaurant (uncredited)
- Mabel, Fatty and the Law (1915, Short) - Tobacco Counter Clerk (uncredited)
- Fatty's New Role (1915, Short) - Mustached Saloon Customer (uncredited)
- Fatty's Reckless Fling (1915, Short) - House Detective
- Fatty's Chance Acquaintance (1915, Short) - Waiter
- Fatty's Faithful Fido (1915, Short)
- That Little Band of Gold (1915, Short) - Judge (uncredited)
- Wished on Mabel (1915, Short) - Plainclothesman in Park
- Mabel's Wilful Way (1915, Short) - Mabel's Father
- Fatty's Tintype Tangle (1915, Short) - Man in Hotel Lobby (uncredited)
- Fickle Fatty's Fall (1915, Short) - Cook
- Fatty and the Broadway Stars (1915, Short) - Man Hit by Coat at Sennett's Office
- A Submarine Pirate (1915, Short) - A Shrewd Inventor / Ship Captain
- Fatty and Mabel Adrift (1916, Short) - I. Landem - Realtor
- Villa of the Movies (1917, Short) - Pancho Villa
- The Rough House (1917, Short)
- The Pullman Bride (1917, Short) - Pullman Waiter
- Are Waitresses Safe? (1917, Short)
- The Cook (1918, Short)
- The Sheriff (1918, Short)
- A Scrap of Paper (1918, Short) - The Kaiser
- Skirts (1921)
- Hearts of Youth (1921) - Reuben Grey
- Straight from the Shoulder (1921) - Pete
- Little Miss Hawkshaw (1921) - Sock Wolf
- What Love Will Do (1921) - Abner Rowan
- The Primal Law (1921) - Ruis
- Iron to Gold (1922) - Sloan
- The Pest (1922, Short) - The landlord
- No Wedding Bells (1923, Short) - An Irate Husband
- Our Alley (1923)
- Main Street (1923) - Harry Haydock
- The Man from Brodney's (1923) - Selim
- Pie-Eyed (1925, Short) - Nightclub manager
- The Iron Mule (1925, Short)
- The Snow Hawk (1925, Short) - Midnight Mike
- Navy Blue Days (1925, Short) - Pete Vermicelli
- The Sleuth (1925, Short) - The Husband
- Keep Smiling (1925) - Doublecrosser
- The Tourist (1925, short)
- Manhattan Madness (1925) - 'Broken Nose' Murphy
- The Movies (1925, Short) - A Traffic Officer
- The Fighting Dude (1925, Short) - The Athletic Instructor
- My Stars (1926, Short) - The Gardener
- Home Cured (1926, Short)
- Fool's Luck (1926, short)
- His Private Life (1926, Short) - The Colonel
- The General (1926) - Union Captain Anderson
- Listen Lena (1927, Short)
- The Good-Bye Kiss (1928) - Minor Role (uncredited)
- Ships of the Night (1928) - Cramsey
- That's My Line (1931, Short) - Henchman
- The Nevada Buckaroo (1931) - Sheriff Hank
- Bengal Tiger (1936)
- Affectionately Yours (1941)
