= Red Hot Romance =

1922 film by Victor Fleming

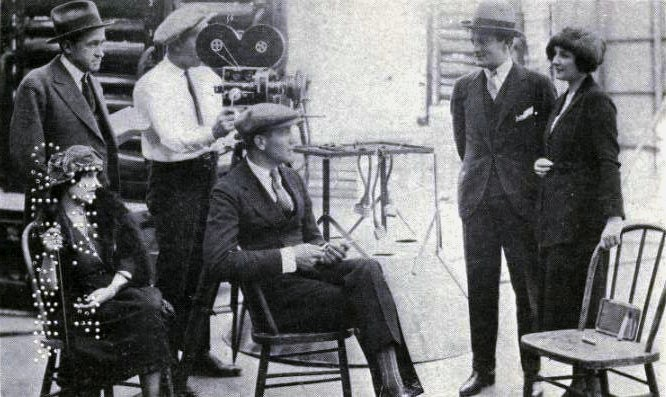
- Makeup test during production. Writers Emerson and Loos at left, director Fleming seated, and Sydney and Collins at right.
- Directed by: Victor Fleming
- Written by: John Emerson; Anita Loos
- Produced by: John Emerson; Anita Loos
- Starring: Basil Sydney
- Cinematography: Oliver T. Marsh; Ernest G. Palmer
- Distributed by: Associated First National
- Release date: February 13, 1922
- Running time: 60 minutes
- Country: United States
- Language: Silent (English intertitles)

Red Hot Romance is a 1922 American silent comedy film directed by Victor Fleming. A fragmentary print survives in the Library of Congress.

== Plot ==
As described in a film magazine, young American Rowland Stone receives $50 per week from the estate of his rich uncle until he reaches age 25, at which time, according to the will, he is to hear of further bequests. He is in love with Anna Mae, the daughter of an old Virginia family, the head of which, Colonel Cassius Byrd, has been waiting 40 years for a diplomatic post. The young man pawns all of his furniture to get her presents. When the day of his big inheritance arrives, Rowland discovers that he is to receive $25 per week and must serve one year as an insurance agent to prove his worth before he can secure his fortune. His sweetheart has gone with her father to the nation of Bunkonia in South America, so the new insurance agent sees there some fertile fields and sets sail with his valet Thomas. In Bunkonia he meets the villainous Jim Conwell, the best families, King Caramba XIII and his cabinet, and he insures everyone in sight. Jim knows the terms of the will and plots a revolution, knowing that the insured king and cabinet will be the first to die and thus ruin the insurance agent. The Colonel, now a counsel, is imprisoned by the plotters and Jim kidnaps Anna Mae, compelling Rowland to save the king, cabinet, sweetheart, and counsel for the sake of insurance, love, and country. During the revolution Rowland is in the difficult position of being unable to kill any of the plotters since they carry policies with his insurance companies. In spite of this handicap, they are all saved with the arrival of the U.S. Marines.

== Cast ==
- Basil Sydney as Rowland Stone
- Henry Warwick as Lord Howe-Greene
- Frank Lalor as King Caramba XIII
- Carl Stockdale as General De Castanet
- Olive Valerie as Madame Puloff de Plotz
- Edward Connelly as Colonel Cassius Byrd
- May Collins as Anna Mae Byrd
- Roy Atwell as Jim Conwell
- Tom Wilson as Thomas Snow
- Lillian Leighton as Mammy
- Snitz Edwards as Signor Frijole

== Production ==
An early working title for the film was Wife Insurance. The full scenario for the film was published in Emerson's and Loos's book Breaking Into the Movies (1921).
