= Fool's Luck =

1926 film

- Directed by: William Goodrich (Roscoe Arbuckle)
- Written by: Roscoe "Fatty" Arbuckle (as William Goodrich)
- Starring: Lupino Lane
- Cinematography: Bert Houck
- Production company: Lupino Lane Comedy Corporation
- Distributed by: Educational Film Exchanges
- Release date: March 21, 1926
- Running time: 15 minutes
- Country: United States
- Language: Silent (English intertitles)

Fool's Luck is a 1926 American silent comedy film directed by Roscoe Arbuckle as William Goodrich. Although Arbuckle was acquitted in the third trial for the death of Virginia Rappe, he could not obtain work in Hollywood under his own name, so he adopted the pseudonym William Goodrich for directing the comedy shorts he made under his contract with Educational Film Exchanges.

== Plot ==
As described in a film magazine review, Percy, a wealthy young man, has his income cut off just when the rent is due and his sweetheart Helen and her father are invited for dinner. The landlord ejects him and his valet. They move out and take their furniture away in a truck, which is demolished by a train. The train agent settles with them for a huge amount just in time for them to purchase a duplicate set of furniture, move it back into their rooms, and pay the rent in time to greet their dinner guests.

== Cast ==
- Lupino Lane as Percy, The Dude
- George Davis as Cuthbert, His Valet
- Virginia Vance as Helen, The Girl
- Jack Lloyd as Her Father
- Glen Cavender as The Policeman (uncredited)
- Mark Hamilton as Express Mover/Truck Driver (uncredited)
- Wallace Lupino as Apartment House Manager (uncredited)

== See also ==
- Roscoe Arbuckle filmography
