= Watch Your Neighbor =

- Directed by: Hampton Del Ruth; Victor Heerman
- Produced by: Mack Sennett Comedies
- Starring: Charles Murray; Mary Thurman; Wayland Trask Jr.
- Cinematography: Fred Jackman; Hans Koenekamp
- Distributed by: Paramount Pictures
- Release date: February 10, 1918
- Running time: 20 minutes
- Country: USA
- Language: Silent..English

Watch Your Neighbor is a 1918 silent film comedy short directed by Hampton Del Ruth and Victor Heerman. It starred Charles Murray and Mary Thurman. It was produced by Mack Sennett in a distribution deal with Paramount Pictures.

== Cast ==
- Charles Murray - M. Balmer, Undertaker
- Wayland Trask - Dr. Milton Croaker, Undertaker's Neighbor
- Mary Thurman - Mrs. Croaker, The Doctor's Wife
- Edgar Kennedy - An Innocent Bystander
- Ben Turpin - Banana Peel Victim
- Cliff Bowes - Dying Man
- Billy Armstrong - Dying Man's Nurse
- Albert T. Gillespie - Bowes, Vapor Treatment Seeker (*as Bert Gillespie)
