= Mai Wells =

American actress

Mai Wells in If I Had a Million (1932)

Mai Wells (14 April 1863 – 1 August 1941), also billed as May Wells and Mae Wells, was an American actress whose career spanned eight decades. A prolific actress of the silent era, she worked with Charlie Chaplin, made at least two films with Roscoe "Fatty" Arbuckle and one sound film, If I Had a Million (1932).

== Early life and family ==
Born (as Mary Lavinia Wells) in San Francisco, California, on April 21, 1862, the daughter of Samuel Adams Wells (1824–1864) and London-born Lavinia Howard née Oldfield, she began her acting career at age 5 in her mother and stepfather's theatrical company. Her education did not advance beyond the sixth grade at elementary school. Her mother appeared on stage with Edwin Booth, while her father, a Boston-born great-grandson of Massachusetts governor Samuel Adams, was one of the earliest Coast singers, entertaining in the saloons and music halls with the San Francisco Minstrels. He was particularly known for the vulgarity of his act and for the songs "The Old Sexton" and "Simon the Cellarer". Excelling as a punster and end-man propounder of conundrums, in 1854 he was a member of Charley Backus’s Original Minstrels in San Francisco. In 1858 he joined with George H. Coes to form Coes and Wells' Minstrels, but that partnership did not last, and Coes returned to performing in other companies. In 1890, the veteran minstrel entertainer William R. "Billy Birch" Garrison recalled of her father:

"In those days we had another excellent man in our company by the name of Sam Wells. Probably very few theater-goers now remember Sam, but he was famous then, and a very valuable man in the minstrel show. He had a heavy bass voice, and his imitation of a clap of indignant thunder was about as good as the genuine article any day in the week. Sam used to sing 'Old Black Joe' and such songs where he could employ basso profundo with effect. During all the time he was associated with us he acted as interlocutor, and he was a good one. He could anticipate the point of a new gig or joke that one of us would perpetrate as quick as a flash, and so govern his own questions and replies. Poor Sam, a number of years ago, met his death in Nevada by being thrown from a horse and sinking his head against a boulder. He was not killed outright, but he died a few days later from his injuries."

She married William M. Chapman, with whom she had two children: Lavinia W. Chapman (1891–1988) and William M. Chapman (1888 –1958). In 1940, the widowed Mai Wells Chapman was living with her son at 23 Glendale Boulevard in Los Angeles.

== Acting career ==
Early in her career, Mai toured Europe and appeared in such David Belasco productions as First Born. An accomplished singer and dancer, Wells made her first screen appearance in 1912, and worked for such studios as Keystone, Powers, Biograph, Reliance-Majestic, Eclair, Edison and The Oz Film Manufacturing Company, among others. An all-purpose character actress, Wells specialised in playing spinsters, busy-body neighbors, nagging mothers-in-law and country wives.

Among her nearly 70 film roles are Old Mombi in His Majesty, the Scarecrow of Oz (1914); Princess Hatatcha in The Last Egyptian (1914), and Miss Terwilliger in Blondes by Choice (1927). She played Mrs. O'Reilly in a series of 'Slim' films (1913–14) starring J. Arthur Nelson as Slim Hoover.

== Death ==
Wells died aged 78 in August 1941 in Los Angeles in California.

== Filmography ==
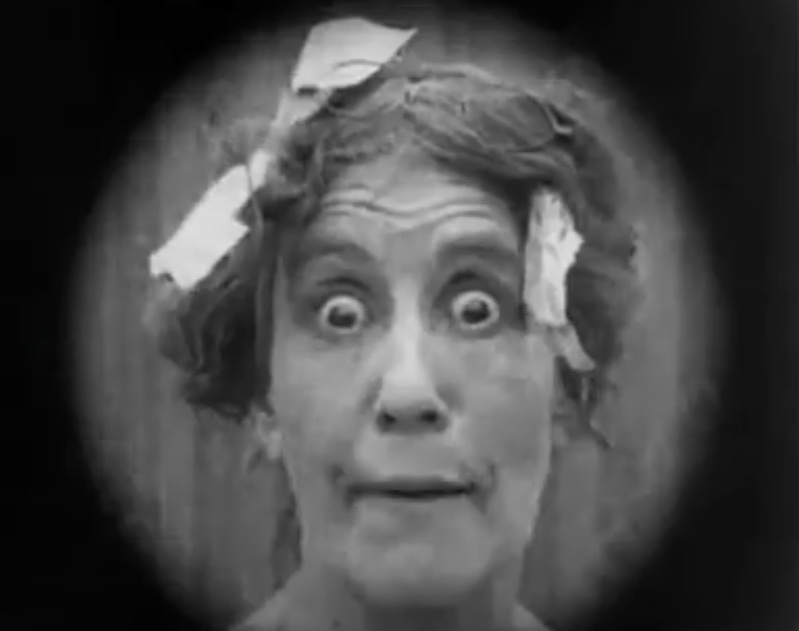
Mai Wells caught by surprise in Fatty's Tintype Tangle (1915)

- If I Had a Million (1932) - Idylwood Resident (uncredited)
- Blondes by Choice (1927) - Miss Terwilliger
- The Wedding Song (1925) - Old Woman (uncredited)
- Assorted Nuts (Short, 1925) - Elmo Billings
- Excuse Me (1925) - Mrs. Job Wales
- The Pilgrim (1923) - Little Boy's Mother
- Opened Shutters (1921) - Martha Lacey
- The Breath of the Gods (1920) - Yuki's Mother
- Old Lady 31 (1920) - Mrs. Homans (as May Wells)
- The Late Lamented (Short, 1917) - The Landlady (as Mae Wells)
- Cactus Nell (Short, 1917) - Nell's Mother (as May Wells)
- Her Fame and Shame (Short, 1917)) - Chaperone (uncredited)
- A Winning Loser (Short, 1917)
- A Self-Made Hero (Short, 1917)
- The Stone Age (Short, 1917)
- The Grab Bag Bride (Short, 1917) - The Homely Woman
- Honest Thieves (Short, 1917)
- Safety First Ambrose (Short, 1916)
- His Busted Trust (Short, 1916) - The Landlady (as May Wells)
- Madcap Ambrose (Short, 1916) - Ambrose's Mother (as Mae Wells)
- His First False Step (Short, 1916) - The Wife's Mother
- The Lion and the Girl (Short, 1916)
- His Auto Ruination (Short, 1916) - The Auto Enthusiast's Wife (as May Wells)
- A Movie Star (Short, 1916) - Jack's Screen Mother (as May Wells)
- Fatty and Mabel Adrift (Short, 1916) - Mabel's Mother (as May Wells)
- Fatty's Tintype Tangle (Short, 1915) - Fatty's Mother-in-Law
- The Last Egyptian (1914) - Princess Hatatcha (Kara's grandmother)
- His Majesty, the Scarecrow of Oz (1914) - Old Mombi (as Mae Wells)
- The Magic Cloak (Short, 1914) - Aunt Rivette (uncredited)
- Hiram and Zeke Masquerade (Short, 1914)
- Johnnie from Jonesboro (Short, 1914) - Mrs. Jones - the Widow
- Whistling Hiram (Short, 1914)
- The Runaway (Short, 1914) - Arthur's Mother
- Cuckooville Goes Skating, (Short, 1914) (as Mae Wells)
- A Neighborly Quarrel (Short, 1914) - The Widow (as Mae Wells)
- That Cuckooville Horse Race (Short, 1914) - The Widow O'Laughagin (as Mae Wells)
- Pretzel's Baby (Short, 1914) - Mrs. Pretzel
- Why Kentucky Went Dry (Short, 1914) (as Mae Wells)
- Black Hands and Dirty Money (Short, 1914) - Mrs. Pretzel (as Mae Wells)
- Colonel Custard's Last Stand (Short, 1914) (as Mae Wells)
- Pretzel Captures the Smugglers (Short, 1914) - Mrs. Pretzel (as Mae Wells)
- Slim Joins the Army (Short, 1914) - Mrs. O'Reilly
- Almost a White Hope (Short, 1914) - Strong's Wife (as Mae Wells)
- Baffles the Gentleman Burglar (Short, 1914) - Old Woman
- Slim to the Rescue (Short, 1914) - Mrs. O'Reilly
- Slim Becomes an Editor (Short, 1914) - Mrs. O'Reilly
- Slim and the Dynamiters (Short, 1914) - Mrs. O'Reilly
- The Saint and the Singer (Short, 1914) (as Mae Wells)
- I Abide with Me (Short, 1914) - Martha's Mother (as Mae Wells)
- The Deuce and Two Pair (Short, 1914) - Miss Freeze (as Mae Wells)
- Too Many Cooks (Short, 1914) - Carson's Mother-in-Law
- Slim and the Money Pots (Short, 1914) - Mrs. Burley
- Just Mother (Short, 1914) (as Mae Wells)
- Slim's Strategy (Short, 1914) - Mrs. O'Reilly
- Slim's Last Trick (Short, 1914) - Mrs. O'Reilly
- Slim Turns the Tables (Short, 1913) - Mrs. O'Reilly (as Mae Wells)
- Slim and the Petticoats (Short, 1913) - Mrs. O'Reilly
- The Gusher (Short), 1913 - Party Guest (uncredited)
- Slim and the Boys at Breezy Beach (Short, 1913) - Mrs. O'Reilly
- Slim Proposes, But... (Short, 1913) - Mrs. O'Reilly
- A Muddy Romance (Short, 1913) - Other Bride
- Slim Becomes a Detective (Short, 1913) - Mrs. O'Reilly
- Slim Gets the Reward (Short, 1913) - Mrs. O'Reilly
- The Running Away of Doris (Short, 1913) (as Mae Wells)
- The Wager (Short, 1912) - Mrs. Livingstone - Grace's Mother (as Mae Wells)
- Lady Clare (Short, 1912) - Old Alice - the Nurse (as Mae Wells)
- The Skeleton (Short, 1912)
