= Cliff Bowes =

American actor (1894–1929)

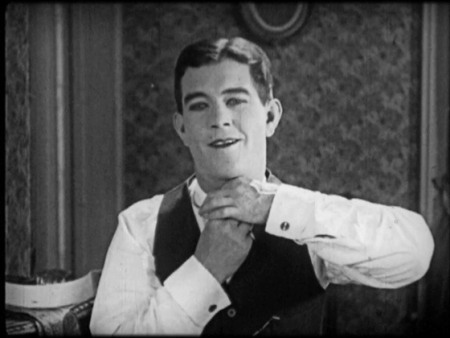
- Bowes in the 1924 film short, Cheer Up
- Born: Clifford Westley Bowes; November 14, 1894; Pueblo, Colorado, United States
- Died: July 6, 1929 (aged 34); Los Angeles, California, United States
- Occupation: Actor
- Years active: 1933–1952

Cliff Bowes (November 14, 1894 – July 6, 1929), also known as Clifford Bowes, was an American silent film actor. He appeared in numerous comedy shorts.

== Biography ==
Born on November 14, 1894, in Pueblo, Colorado, Bowes began his film career with a small, un-credited role in the 1916 film short His Lying Heart, starring Ford Sterling. When the United States entered World War I, Bowes served as a navy pilot. By the end of the decade he was starring in short films, and during the 1920s he made over 100 of them. In 1920, he starred as Waldo Pennanink in his only full-length film, Up in Mary's Attic. In 1923 he began starring in the Educational Pictures film short series Mermaid Comedies, which ran through 1925. He is best remembered for another Education series, Cameo Comedies, which co-starred Virginia Vance, which also began in 1923. His final screen performance was in a supporting role in 1929's Stage Struck Susie, starring Frances Lee. At the age of 34, Bowes died on July 6, 1929, of a sudden stoke shortly after the release of Stage Struck Susie.

== Selected filmography ==
- Cactus Nell (1917)
- Are Waitresses Safe? (1917)
- Watch Your Neighbor (1918)
- King of the Jungle (1927)
