= The Vermilion Pencil =

1922 silent film by Norman Dawn

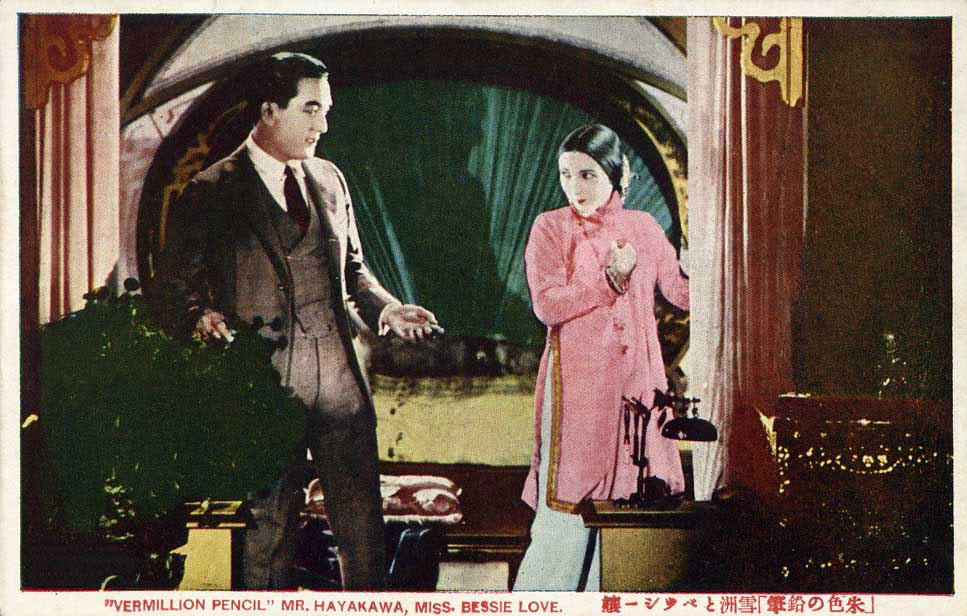
- Lobby card
- Directed by: Norman Dawn
- Written by: Edwin Warren Juyol; Alice Catlin
- Based on: The Vermilion Pencil: A Romance of China (novel) by Homer Lea
- Starring: Sessue Hayakawa; Ann May; Misao Seki; Bessie Love; Sidney Franklin
- Cinematography: Joseph A. Du Bray
- Production company: Robertson–Cole Pictures Corporation
- Distributed by: Robertson–Cole
- Release date: March 19, 1922 (U.S.)
- Running time: 5 reels; 4,900 feet
- Country: United States
- Language: Silent (English intertitles)

The Vermilion Pencil is a 1922 American silent drama film directed by Norman Dawn, and produced and distributed by Robertson–Cole. It is based on the eponymous 1908 novel by Homer Lea. The film stars Japanese actor Sessue Hayakawa in multiple roles, and white actors Ann May, Bessie Love, and Sidney Franklin, all in Asian roles. It is now a lost film.

After completing this film, Hayakawa learned that members of the studio who made the film were active in the anti-Japanese movement, and he left Hollywood for over a decade.

== Production ==
Extras were cast from Chinatown, Los Angeles, and the value of the costumes worn by the principals cost $20,000 (equivalent to $380,000 in 2025). To darken her hair for the film, Bessie Love used mascara. Despite this, Love called the film "thoughtfully produced".

Exteriors were filmed in the Sierra Nevada mountains. Some scenes were filmed at the Hollywood home of Adolph and Eugene Bernheimer, now the Japanese restaurant Yamashiro.

== Plot ==
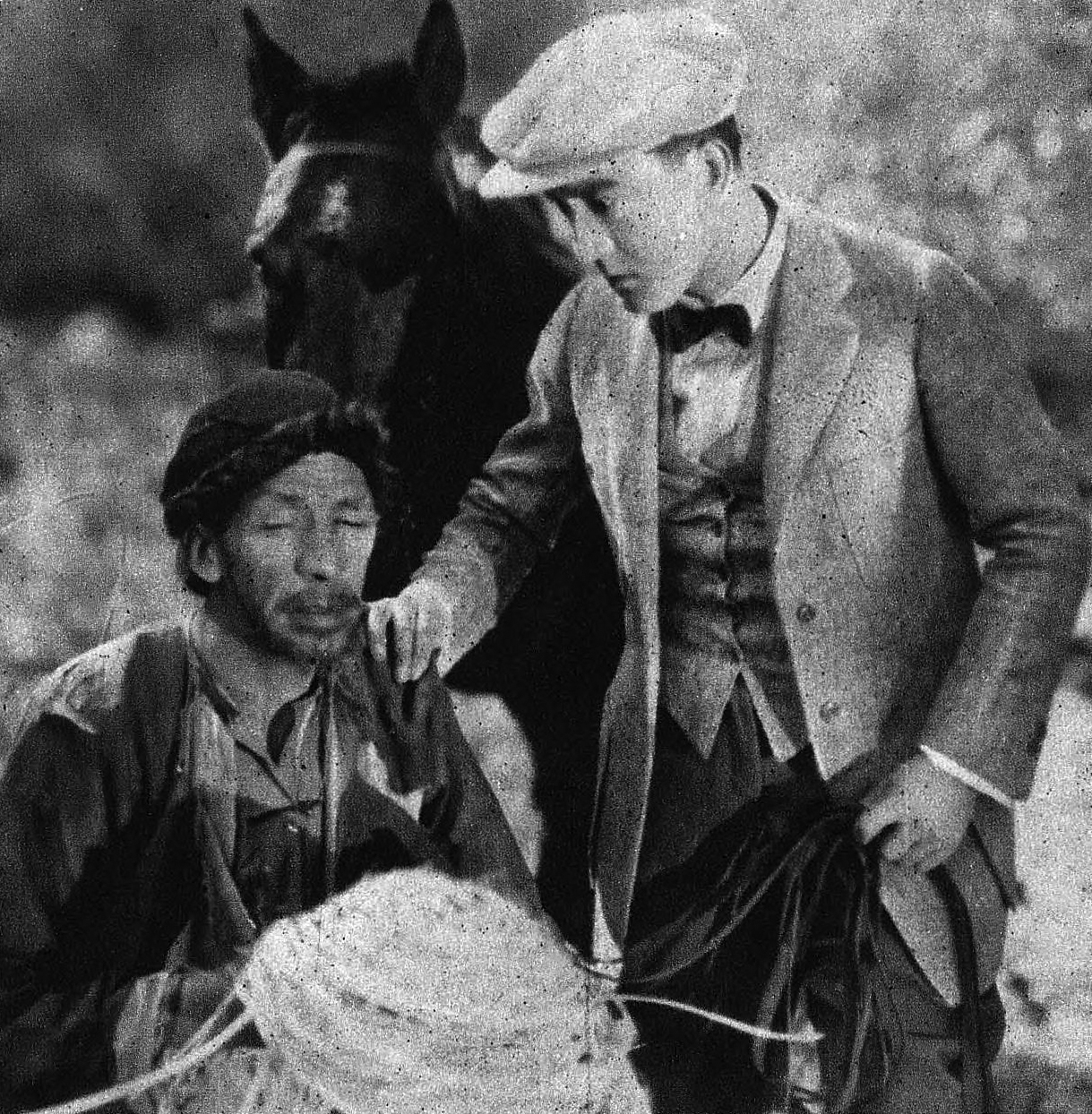
Omar Whitehead (seated) as Ma Shue, with Sessue Hayakawa as Li Chan

In China, Tse Chan flees to the mountains after his wife is executed under the command of the unscrupulous Ling Chee.

His son Li Chan, who has grown up in America, returns to China many years later as a successful civil engineer. Li falls in love with the beautiful Hyacinth, who is betrothed to the viceroy Fu Wong. Li takes a position as Hyacinth's private tutor, and the pair escapes to the mountains.

They hide in the crater of a volcano and are captured when they nearly suffocate from the fumes. The viceroy is about to have them executed when The Unknown helps them escape by sacrificing himself in the volcano, causing it to erupt.

== Cast ==
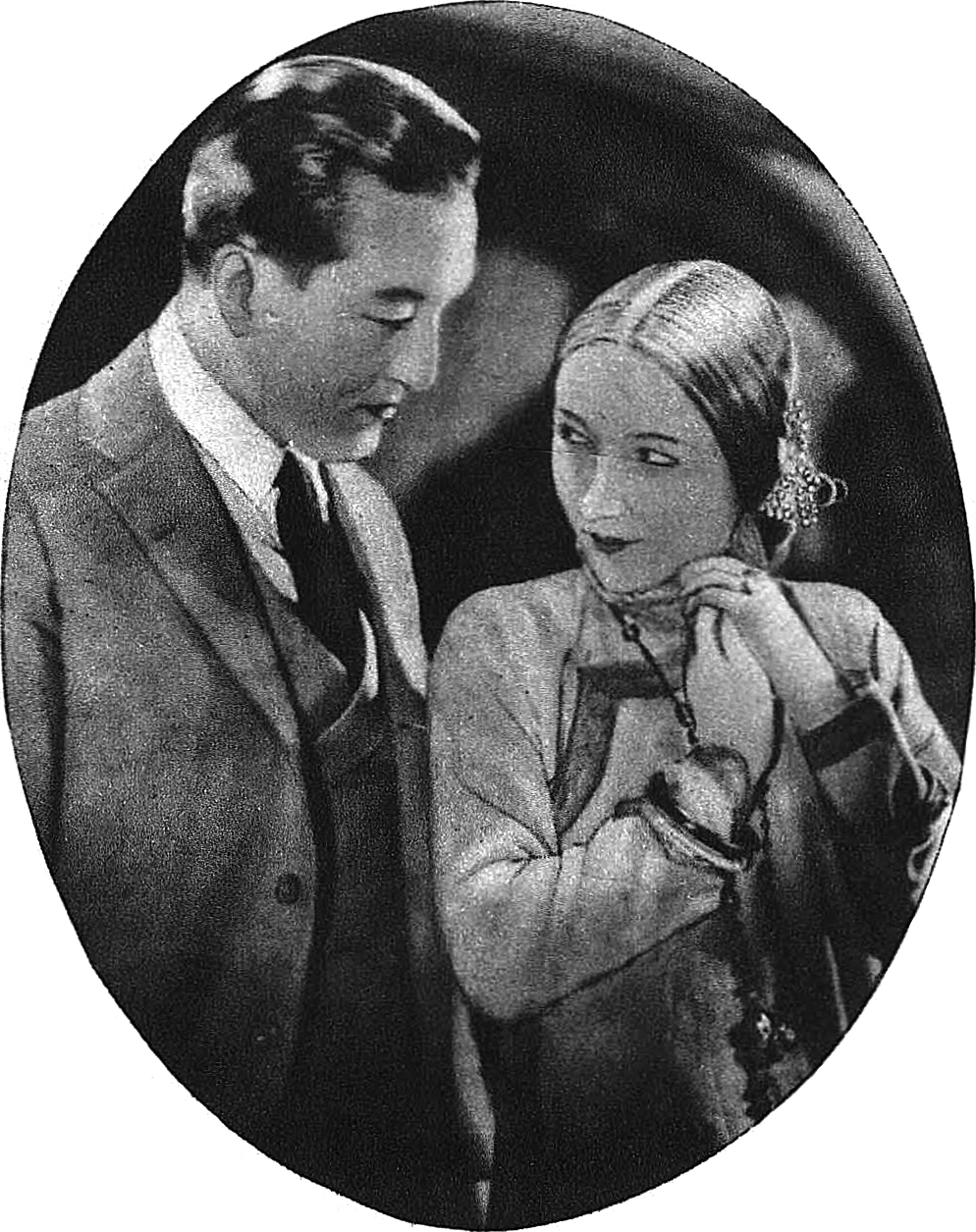
Sessue Hayakawa as Li Chan with Bessie Love as Hyacinth

- Sessue Hayakawa as Tse Chan / Li Chan / The Unknown
- Ann May as Tse Chan's wife
- Misao Seki as Pai Wang
- Bessie Love as Hyacinth
- Sidney Franklin as Fu Wong
- Thomas Jefferson as Ho Ling
- Tote Du Crow as The Jackal
- Omar Whitehead as Ma Shue
- Lock Chy as extra (uncredited)

== Reception ==
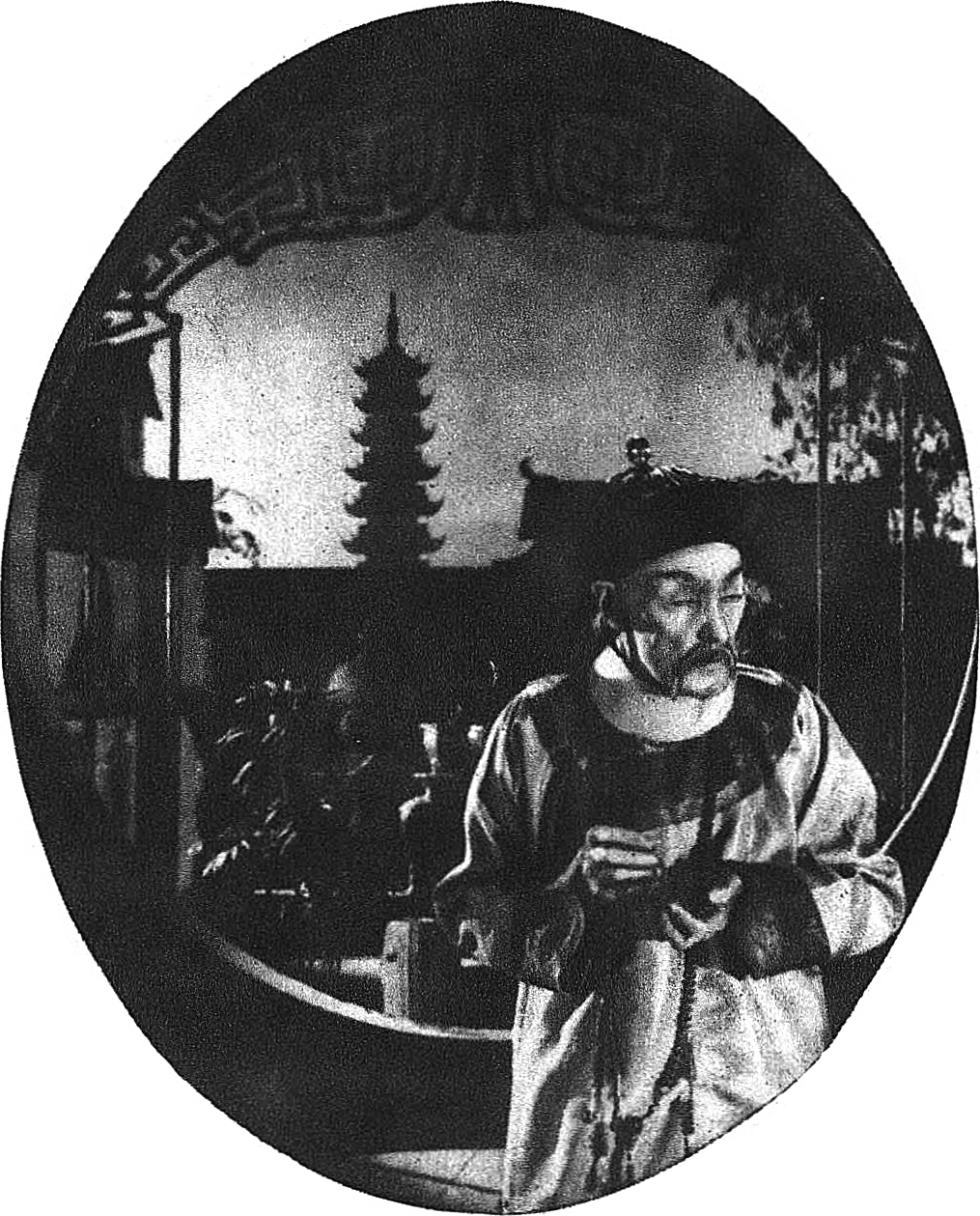
Thomas Jefferson as Ho Ling

The film received generally positive reviews, and was commercially successful. The visuals were consistently acclaimed. Hayakawa's performance received positive reviews. Bessie Love's performance and star power were noted as a box office draw.

== See also ==
- Examples of yellowface
- Racism in early American film
- Whitewashing in film
