= The Fighting Dude =

1925 film

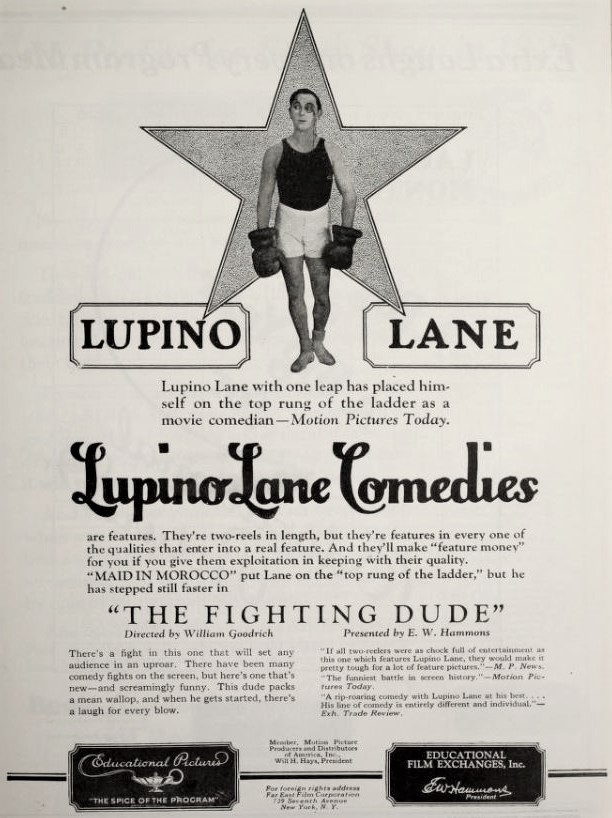
- Advertisement
- Directed by: Fatty Arbuckle (as William Goodrich)
- Written by: Fatty Arbuckle (as William Goodrich)
- Produced by: Lupino Lane
- Starring: Lupino Lane
- Cinematography: Byron Houck
- Production company: Lupino Lane Comedy Corporation
- Distributed by: Educational Film Exchanges
- Release date: December 6, 1925
- Running time: 2 reels
- Country: United States
- Language: Silent (English intertitles)

The Fighting Dude is a 1925 American silent comedy film directed and written by Fatty Arbuckle as William Goodrich. A print of The Fighting Dude exists. Although Arbuckle was acquitted in the third trial for the death of Virginia Rappe, he could not obtain work in Hollywood under his own name, so he adopted the pseudonym William Goodrich for directing the comedy shorts he made under his contract with Educational Film Exchanges.

== Plot ==
As described in a film magazine review, an unathletic young man who is in love is ejected from a party at his sweetheart’s home by his rival. Thereupon he goes into training and challenges the rival to battle in a boxing match. In the fight in the ring the young man is badly beaten. He continues training and one day gives his rival a thorough thrashing after catching him on a golf course. However, while the two young men have been fighting, the young woman has found two more admirers. The new champion then decides that even he cannot whip the entire masculine half of the human race and gives up his pursuit of this young woman's affection.

== Cast ==
- Lupino Lane as The Dude
- Virginia Vance as The Dude's Sweetheart
- Wallace Lupino as The Dude's Rival
- Glen Cavender as The Athletic Instructor
- George Davis as The Dude's Valet
- Dick Sutherland

== See also ==
- List of American films of 1925
- Roscoe Arbuckle filmography
