= Thundering Hoofs (1924 film) =

1924 film directed by Albert S. Rogell

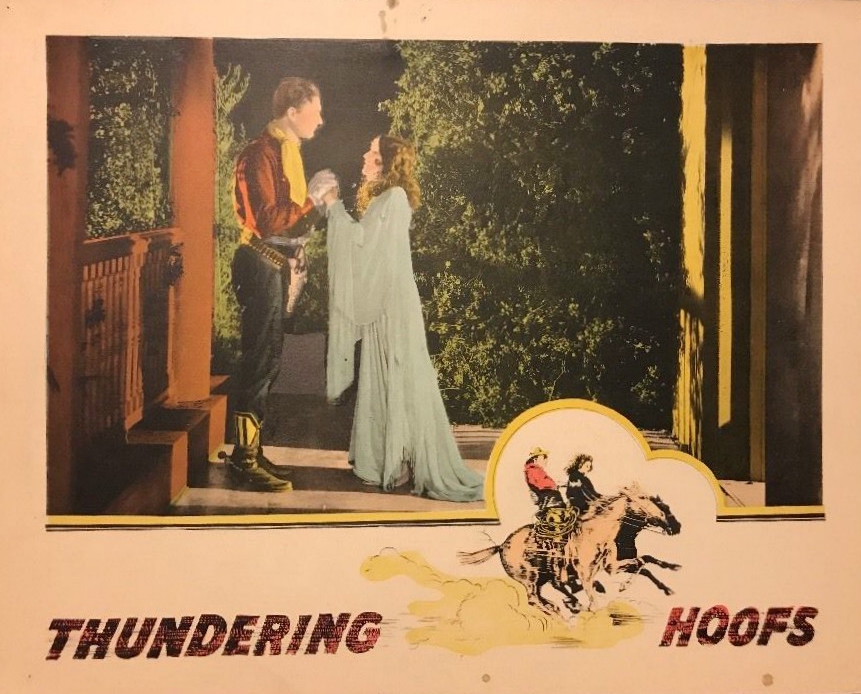
- Lobby card
- Directed by: Albert S. Rogell
- Written by: Marion Jackson; Frances Marion
- Starring: Fred Thomson; Ann May; William Lowery
- Cinematography: Ross Fisher
- Production company: Film Booking Offices of America
- Distributed by: Film Booking Offices of America
- Release date: October 26, 1924
- Running time: 50 minutes
- Country: United States
- Language: Silent (English intertitles)

Thundering Hoofs is a 1924 American silent Western film directed by Albert S. Rogell and starring Fred Thomson, Ann May, and William Lowery.

== Plot ==
As described in a review in a film magazine, Dave Marshall fights Luke Severn when he finds him beating his beautiful white horse Silver King on the understanding the horse is to be allowed to choose his master, and the horse chooses Dave. Severn arranges with bandits to waylay a coach carrying Don Estrada, who is carrying money, and his daughter Carmelita. Dave saves the situation by lassoing all the bandits and suspending them from a tree. The coach's horses run away, but Dave catches up to the coach, grasps the wagon pole from beneath, pulls himself up to the seat and stops the runaway coach. However, Severn slanders him by telling Don Estrada Dave is a bandit. Dave nevertheless continues to visit Carmelita on the sly, and meets with narrow escapes and much adventure. The Don and Carmelita return to Mexico and she writes Dave, saying she is to be forced to marry Severn. Dave follows, seeking to prevent the wedding. He is thrown in jail by the infuriated Don. Severn secures Silver King, beats the horse, and finally sends it into the bull ring. Dave manages to escape and he dashes through the streets, eluding the Mexican soldiers by climbing over housetops, leaping from one to another, finally landing in the ring just as the horse is knocked down. Seizing the maddened bull by the horns, he gives the excited populace the thrill of their lives by using his cowboy experience in bulldogging the animal. The audience goes wild with enthusiasm. After a sheriff from the United States arrives with a warrant charging Severn with being the leader of a gang of bandits, the Don gives his consent to Dave’s marriage to Carmelita.

== Cast ==
- Fred Thomson as Dave Marshall
- Ann May as Carmelita Estrada
- William Lowery as Luke Severn
- Fred Huntley as John Marshall
- Charles Hill Mailes as Don Juan Estrada
- Charles De Ravenne as Don Carlos Estrada
- Carrie Clark Ward as Duenna
- Willie Fung as Cook

== Preservation ==
Prints of Thundering Hoofs are held by the UCLA Film & Television Archive and private collections.

== Bibliography ==
- Donald W. McCaffrey & Christopher P. Jacobs. Guide to the Silent Years of American Cinema. Greenwood Publishing, 1999. ISBN 0-313-30345-2
