= A Scrap of Paper =

1918 film

- Directed by: Fatty Arbuckle
- Starring: Fatty Arbuckle
- Release date: 1918
- Country: United States
- Language: Silent with English intertitles

A Scrap of Paper is a 1918 American short comedy film directed by and starring Fatty Arbuckle.

== Cast ==
- Roscoe "Fatty" Arbuckle - Fatty
- Glen Cavender - The Kaiser
- Al St. John - The Crown Prince
- Monty Banks - Soldier

== See also ==
- Fatty Arbuckle filmography
