= Stupid, But Brave =

1924 film

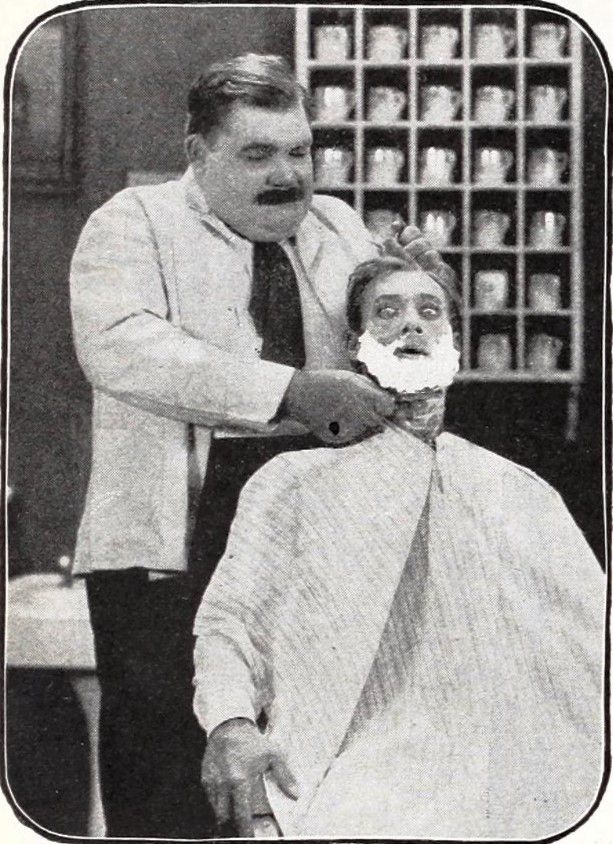
- Still with Kewpie Morgan and Al St. John
- Directed by: William Goodrich (Roscoe Arbuckle)
- Starring: Al St. John
- Production company: Reel Comedies Inc.
- Distributed by: Educational Film Exchanges
- Release date: October 26, 1924
- Running time: 2 reels
- Country: United States
- Language: Silent (English intertitles)

Stupid, But Brave is a 1924 American silent comedy short film directed by Roscoe Arbuckle credited under the pseudonym of William Goodrich.

Arbuckle does not play in the film, which was distributed by Educational.

== Cast ==
- Al St. John as The Bum
- Doris Deane as The Peeling Daughter
- Eugene Pallette as Richard Peeling - Banana King
- Kewpie Morgan as The Barber
- Clem Beauchamp as Minor Role (uncredited)
- George Davis as A Bum (uncredited)

== See also ==
- Fatty Arbuckle filmography
