= Marriage Rows =

1931 film

- Directed by: Fatty Arbuckle (as William Goodrich)
- Written by: Fatty Arbuckle (as William Goodrich); Walter F. Reed
- Produced by: Harry D. Edwards
- Starring: Lloyd Hamilton
- Release date: January 18, 1931
- Running time: 19 minutes
- Country: United States
- Language: English

Marriage Rows is an American Pre-Code 1931 comedy film co-written and directed by Fatty Arbuckle.

== Cast ==
- Lloyd Hamilton
- Al St. John
- Addie McPhail
- Doris Deane
- Edna Marion

== See also ==
- Fatty Arbuckle filmography
