= Fatty and Mabel Adrift =

1916 short film by Roscoe Arbuckle

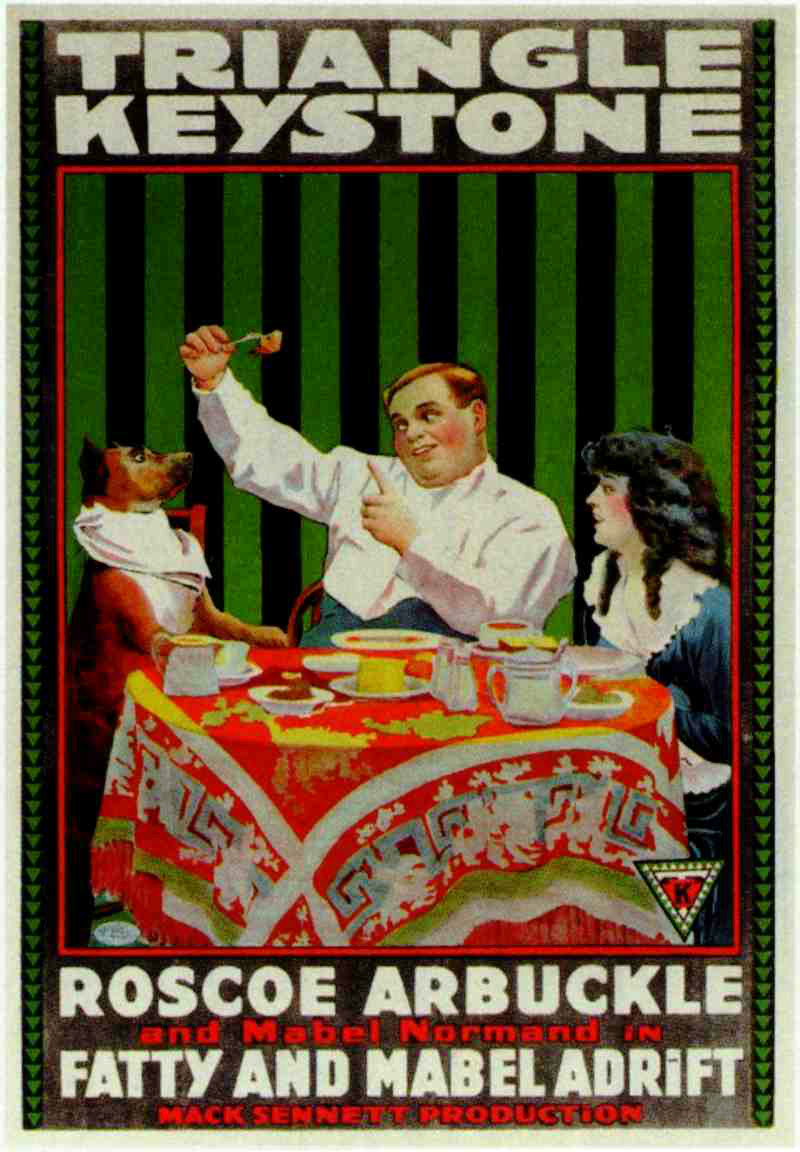
- Original 1916 theatrical poster
- Directed by: Roscoe "Fatty" Arbuckle
- Written by: Roscoe "Fatty" Arbuckle
- Produced by: Mack Sennett
- Starring: Roscoe "Fatty" Arbuckle; Mabel Normand; Al St. John; Joe Bordeaux; Jimmy Bryant; Glen Cavender; Luke the Dog; Frank Hayes; Wayland Trask; Mai Wells
- Production company: Keystone Studios
- Distributed by: Triangle Film Corporation
- Release date: January 9, 1916
- Running time: 34 minutes
- Country: United States
- Languages: Silent film English (original intertitles)

Fatty and Mabel Adrift is a 1916 short comedy film produced by Keystone Studios and starring Roscoe "Fatty" Arbuckle, Mabel Normand, and Al St. John.

== Plot ==
The story involves a farm boy marrying his sweetheart, Mabel. They have their honeymoon with Fatty's dog Luke at a cottage on the seashore. At high tide that night, Hiram Perkins' son and his confederates set the cottage adrift. Fatty and Mabel awaken the next morning to find their small house floating in the ocean and water rapidly flooding their bedroom.

== Cast ==
Scene from Fatty and Mabel Adrift, the one used in graphic form on the film's theatrical poster

- Roscoe "Fatty" Arbuckle as Fatty
- Mabel Normand as Mabel
- Al St. John as Hiram Perkins' son
- Joe Bordeaux as Henchman
- Jimmy Bryant as Henchman
- Glen Cavender as I. Landem, Realtor
- Luke the Dog (miscredited "Teddy, The Keystone Dog") (Note: The composer of the original 1916 screen credits erroneously identifies Luke as Teddy, another dog star at Keystone in the silent era. Teddy, however, was a Great Dane, not an American Staffordshire Terrier like Luke.)
- Frank Hayes as Mabel's father
- Wayland Trask as Brutus Bombastic, Chief Criminal
- Mai Wells as Mabel's mother (as May Wells)

== Critical response ==
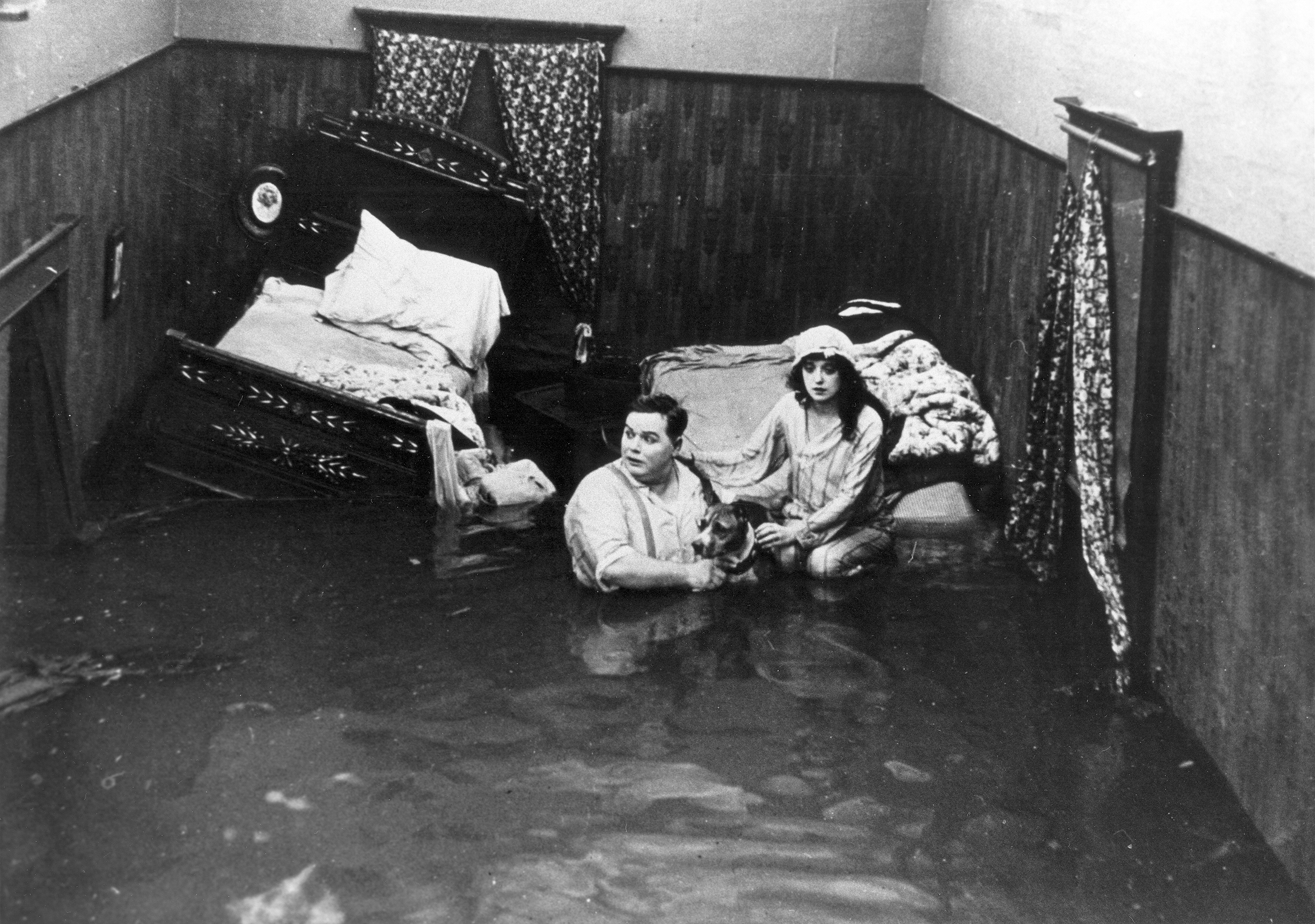
Roscoe, Luke and Mabel receive a surprise.

Variety in its 1916 review gives the film a positive review, commenting that "the picture is amusing with some new and good effects, without the customary dose of messy slapstick one expects in a Keystone with these principals." As was often the case in contemporary reviews of Arbuckle films, the direction of the film is singled out for praise, although it is not mentioned that Arbuckle himself is the director. The review mentions "a dandy lightning storm is a feature of the film and there are some pretty views of breakers rushing on to the shore." The review also contends that Al St. John's performance is not as good as his usual work for Keystone but adds, "The picture is a sure laugh maker and as it is fairly clean, it is the more worthy."

Fatty and Mabel Adrift was the closing movie of the 56-film Arbuckle retrospective at the Museum of Modern Art in New York City in April and May 2006. Prior to the presentation of this short, the event's curators cited the film as their favorite of Arbuckle's screen productions.

== See also ==
- List of American films of 1916
- Roscoe Arbuckle filmography
- Dave Douglas's Keystone, a new soundtrack for the film
