= Lombardi, Ltd. =

1919 film by Jack Conway

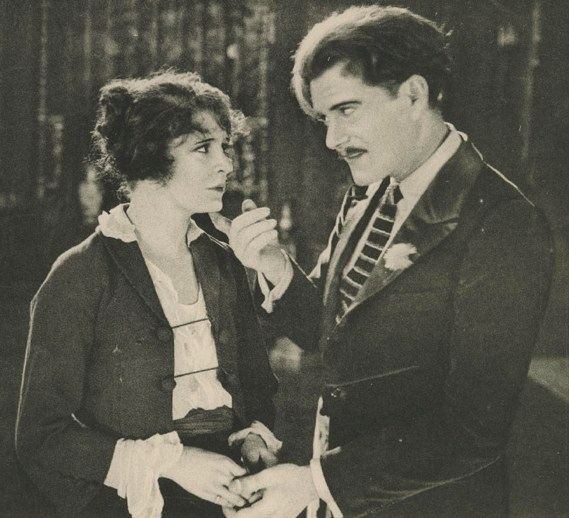
- Still from film with Alice Lake and Bert Lytell
- Directed by: Jack Conway
- Written by: June Mathis (scenario)
- Based on: Lombardi, Ltd. by Fanny Hatton and Frederic Hatton
- Starring: Bert Lytell; Alice Lake; Vera Lewis; Juanita Hansen; Jean Acker; Joseph Kilgour; Ann May
- Cinematography: Robert Kurrle
- Distributed by: Metro Pictures
- Release date: October 1919
- Running time: 7 reels
- Country: United States
- Language: Silent (English intertitles)

Lombardi, Ltd. (also sometimes styled Lombardi Limited in publicity materials) is a surviving 1919 American silent feature comedy film. It was adapted by June Mathis from a 1917 play of the same name by Frederick and Fanny Hatton, and directed by Jack Conway. Warner Baxter had an early uncredited minor role in the film.

== Plot ==
Tito Lombardi's struggling Fifth Avenue couture house is spiraling into financial failure. Through a Broadway investor he meets and falls for a showgirl who soon proves to be a gold-digger; his attractive but unassuming female assistant Norah loves him but has never made her feelings known. With money from a third-party inheritance and some ingenuity on Norah's part, the House of Lombardi is resurrected. Lombardi and Norah find true love together.

== Cast ==
- Bert Lytell as Tito Lambardi
- Alice Lake as Norah Blake
- Vera Lewis as Mollie
- Juanita Hansen as Phyllis Manning
- George A. McDaniel as Riccardo 'Ricky' Tosello
- Joseph Kilgour as Bob Tarrant
- Thomas Jefferson as James Hodkins
- Thea Talbot as Eloise
- Ann May as Lida
- John Steppling as Max Strohan
- Jean Acker as Daisy
- Virginia Caldwell as Yvette
- Golda Madden as Clothilde
- Miss DuPont as Muriel (credited as Patricia Hannan)

== Preservation status ==
A print of Lombardi, Ltd. was donated by the MGM and is preserved at the George Eastman Museum.
