= Ann May =

American actress (Ann Beatrice Sullivan; 1898–1985)

- May, c. 1921
- Born: Anna Beatrice Max; November 25, 1898; Cincinnati, Ohio, U.S.
- Died: July 26, 1985 (aged 86); Los Angeles, California, U.S.
- Resting place: Inglewood Park Cemetery
- Other name: Ann Sullivan
- Occupation: Actress
- Years active: 1919–1925
- Spouse: C. Gardner Sullivan (m. 1925; died 1965)
- Children: 4

Ann Beatrice Sullivan (born Anna Beatrice Max; November 25, 1898 – July 26, 1985), known professionally as Ann May, was a silent film star who appeared in motion pictures from 1919 to 1925.

== Early life and career ==
Ann May was born Anna Beatrice Max in Cincinnati on November 25, 1898, the first child to Russian-Jewish immigrants Nathan Max (1872–1917) and Sylvia Max (née Marks). She had four brothers; Benjamin, Isadore, Jacob "Jack", and Harry. She attended Woodward High School, where she was part of the glee club and swimming team. After finishing high school, she won a scholarship to do post-graduate work at Ursula Academy. After her father, who was opposed to May pursuing a career in acting, died, she moved to Hollywood. Her first roles were minor parts in the productions of Samuel Goldwyn and Famous Players–Lasky.

Her career began to rise after she received a wire from actor Charles Ray, who said he had a role for her as leading lady in his film, Paris Green (1920). She had met Ray following a game of tennis at the Beverly Hills Hotel. By late 1919, she was earning an income of $200 per week making movies.

May was among the supporting cast of Lombardi, Ltd. (1919), a movie which featured Bert Lytell. Released by Metro Pictures in October 1919, the Jack Conway directed film recreated a story which was previously acted on the stage. In the comedy the character Tito Lombardi exerts his influence on three women, two of them played by Alice Lake and Vera Lewis. May secured this role while conversing with Conway at a party. She later became acquainted with Pat Powers who gave her an opportunity at Universal Pictures.

In The Half Breed (1922) May was paired with Wheeler Oakman in a Western produced by Oliver Morosco. The daring scenes she performed in this movie showed her talent as a performer. As an actress she was diverse enough to play a daring rider or a delicate society girl from the East. One film critic questioned why May was not a bigger star in her profession. He made reference to her "elfin humor, a tropical vampishness that is irresistible charm."

She was in The Dangerous Maid (1923), a production of Joseph Schenck which gave Constance Talmadge her first opportunity to act in a dramatic role. The setting of the film is England during the rebellion of the Duke of Monmouth against James II. May began work on The End of the World in April 1924 after a break of several months, during which she performed on stage. She played the role of a vamp in Waking Up the Town (1925), which starred Norma Shearer and Jack Pickford. Directed by Vernon Keays, the movie was shot on location in Carmel, California. May was injured during filming when a large piece of wood struck her in the forearm during a most realistic action scene, which resembled an earthquake. She was forced to stop working for several days until her arm healed.

In The Fighting Cub May had the leading feminine role in a feature about a cub reporter. Directed by Paul Hurst, the film costarred Mildred Harris and Pat O'Malley. The melodrama written by Phil Goldstone has Wesley Barry as the young reporter and O'Malley as the editor of a large daily newspaper.

== Personal life ==
She practiced dancing with modern dance pioneer and choreographer, Ruth St. Denis, on the front lawn of May's Hollywood home. Early in her career May resided for a time at the Hollywood Studio Club.

A petition filed in a Cincinnati Federal Court in September 1921 revealed that May was the beneficiary of an insurance policy taken out by E.M. Noel, a wealthy oil man who died in Cincinnati in January 1920. It was disclosed that Noel purchased two automobiles, jewelry, and advanced large sums of money, amounting to $30,000, to May. One of the cars had been recovered from May with the lawyer's advice. The $75,000 insurance benefit to May was cancelled by Noel upon the attorney's persuasion.

In 1919 May became engaged to actor Ralph Graves after meeting him at the studio of D.W. Griffith. She married the screenwriter and producer C. Gardner Sullivan on February 14, 1925, in Santa Ana. They had four children together; daughter Sheilah Dree, and sons Charles Gardner, Michael Patrick, and Timothy Reese.

May died on July 26, 1985, in Los Angeles, and was buried at Inglewood Park Cemetery.

== Partial filmography ==
- Marriage for Convenience (1919)
- Paris Green (1920)
- An Amateur Devil (1920)
- The Vermilion Pencil (1922)
- The Half Breed (1922)
- The Fog (1923)
- The Dangerous Maid (1923)
- The End of the World (1924)
- What Shall I Do? (1924)
- Thundering Hoofs (1924)
- Waking Up the Town (1925)
- The Fighting Cub (1925)
