= The Pullman Bride =

1917 film directed by Clarence G. Badger

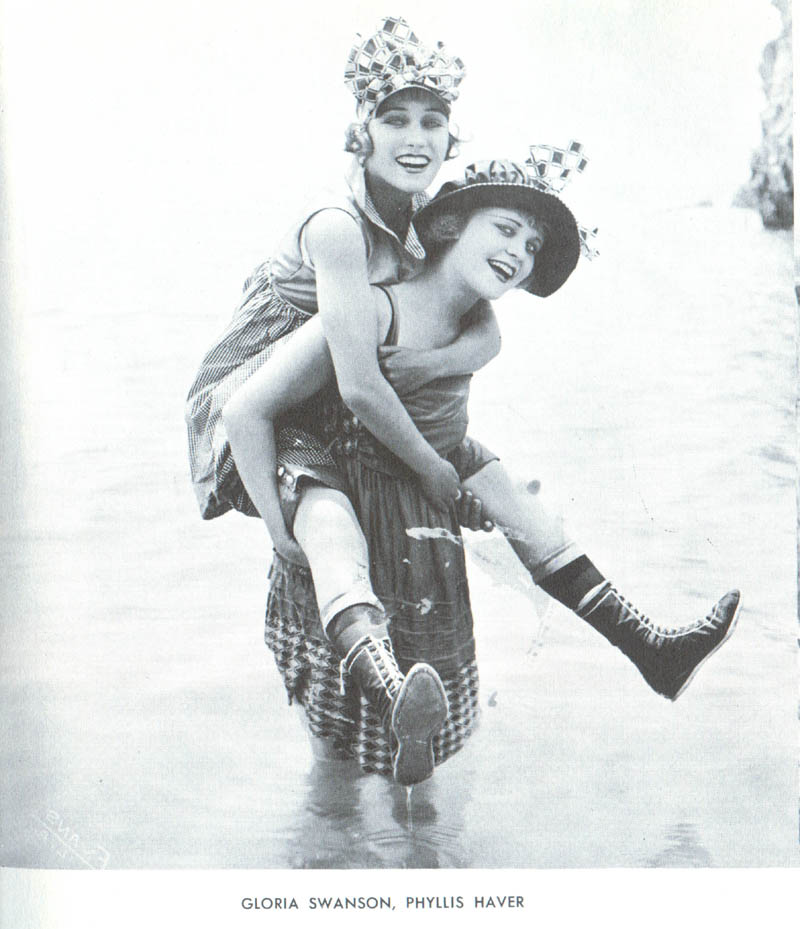
- Gloria Swanson and Phyllis Haver
- Directed by: Clarence G. Badger
- Produced by: Mack Sennett (Keystone Studios)
- Starring: Gloria Swanson
- Cinematography: J.R. Lockwood
- Distributed by: Paramount Pictures
- Release date: November 4, 1917
- Running time: 2 reels
- Country: United States
- Languages: Silent; English intertitles

The Pullman Bride is a 1917 American silent comedy film directed by Clarence G. Badger and starring Gloria Swanson.

== Cast ==
- Gloria Swanson as The Girl
- Mack Swain as The Chosen One
- Chester Conklin as A Rejected Suitor
- Laura La Varnie as The Girl's Mother
- Tom Kennedy as A Bandit
- Polly Moran as Sheriff Nell
- Wayland Trask, Jr.
- Gene Rogers
- Jack Cooper
- Vera Steadman
- Abdul
- Glen Cavender
- James Donnelly as Bit Role (uncredited)
- Elinor Field as Sennett Bathing Girl (uncredited)
- Albert T. Gillespie as Bit Role (uncredited)
- Phyllis Haver as Sennett Bathing Girl (uncredited)
- Anthony O'Sullivan as Bit Role (uncredited)
- Marvel Rea as Sennett Bathing Girl (uncredited)
