= Cactus Nell =

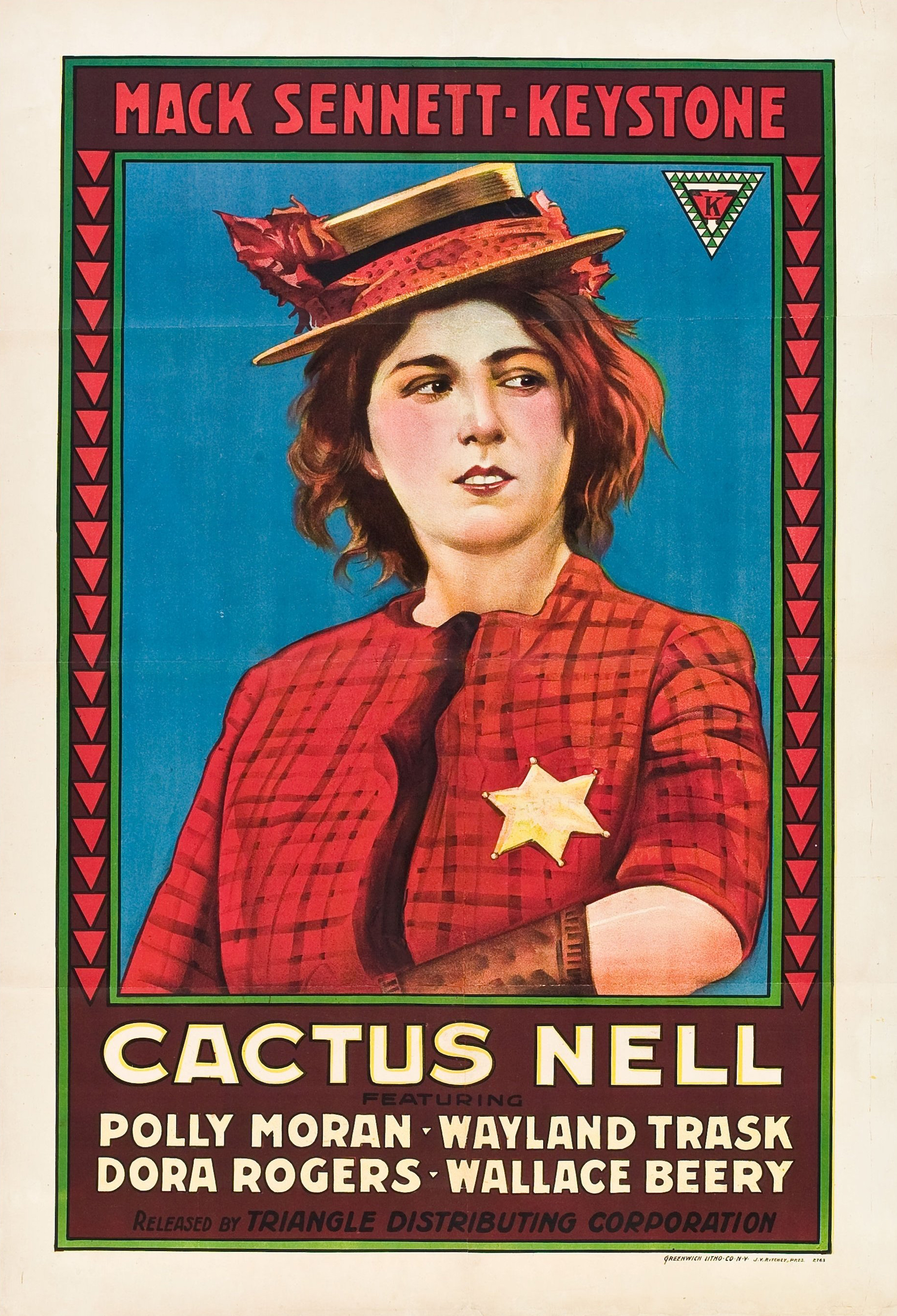
- Directed by: Fred Hibbard (as Fred Fishback); Whitney Sovern(assistant director)
- Produced by: Keystone Studios
- Starring: Polly Moran; Wallace Beery
- Cinematography: J. R. Lockwood
- Distributed by: Triangle Film Corporation
- Release date: June 3, 1917
- Running time: 2 reels
- Languages: Silent; (English title cards)

Cactus Nell is a 1917 silent short comedy film starring Polly Moran. It was directed by Fred Hibbard and was produced by the Keystone Company with distribution through Triangle. Fontaine La Rue and Wally Beery appear in the film.

== Cast ==
- Polly Moran - Cactus Nell, The New Sheriff
- Wayland Trask - Bud, Nell's Sweetheart
- Wallace Beery - A Polished Gent
- Fontaine La Rue - The Gent's Accomplice (*billed Dora Rodgers)
- Cliff Bowes - The Town Drunk
- Joey Jacobs - Nell's Little Brother
- Mai Wells - Nell's Mother
- Gene Rogers - The Mortgage Holder
- Clarence Lyndon - The Mayor
- Malcolm St. Clair - The Courier
- Jack Perrin - The Banjo Player
- Bob Kortman - unverified (*billed Robert Kortman)
- Ben Turpin-?
- Chester Conklin -?
