= Paris Green (film) =

1920 film

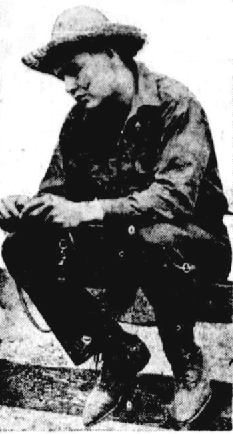
- Charles Ray in the film
- Directed by: Jerome Storm
- Screenplay by: Julien Josephson
- Produced by: Thomas H. Ince
- Starring: Charles Ray; Ann May; Bert Woodruff; Gertrude Claire; Donald MacDonald; Gordon Mullen
- Cinematography: Chester A. Lyons
- Production companies: Thomas H. Ince Productions; Artcraft Pictures Corporation; Famous Players–Lasky Corporation
- Distributed by: Paramount Pictures
- Release date: June 1920
- Running time: 50 minutes
- Country: United States
- Language: Silent (English intertitles)

Paris Green is a 1920 American silent comedy film directed by Jerome Storm and written by Julien Josephson. The film stars Charles Ray, Ann May, Bert Woodruff, Gertrude Claire, Donald MacDonald, and Gordon Mullen. The film was released in June 1920, by Paramount Pictures.

== Plot ==
As described in a film magazine, Corporal Luther Green, famously known as Paris Green, has one hour to see Paris before sailing home. At lunch he meets Ninon, a French girl who is planning to visit her uncle in America. Luther gives her his address. Luther finds upon his return to Quigley Corners, New Jersey, that his former sweetheart has transferred her affections to another, so he decides to go to New York City and forget her. On the road to the railroad station he meets Ninon, who having missed her uncle at the pier was going to the only address in the United States that she knows. Luther takes her back to his family's farm and advertises in the papers. Ninon's uncle arrives in response to the advertisement at about the same time as two crooks do. The crooks had failed to kidnap Ninon in New York, but are successful in the country. After a hard ride by horseback Luther catches up to the speeding car and rescues Ninon.

== Cast ==
- Charles Ray as Luther Green
- Ann May as Ninon Robinet
- Bert Woodruff as Mathew Green
- Gertrude Claire as Sarah Green
- Donald MacDonald as Jules Benoit
- Gordon Mullen as 'Hairpin' Petrie
- Norris Johnson as Edith Gleason
- William Courtright as Malachi Miller
- Ida Lewis as Mrs. Miller
- Otto Hoffman as Andre Robinet

== Preservation ==
The film is preserved with a copy held at the George Eastman Museum Motion Picture Collection.
