= His Private Life (1926 film) =

1926 film

- Directed by: William Goodrich (Roscoe Arbuckle)
- Written by: Fatty Arbuckle (as William Goodrich)
- Starring: Lupino Lane
- Cinematography: Byron Houck
- Release date: May 16, 1926
- Running time: 21 minutes
- Country: United States
- Languages: Silent; English intertitles

His Private Life is a 1926 American comedy film directed by Roscoe "Fatty" Arbuckle using the pseudonym William Goodrich.

== Cast ==
- Lupino Lane
- Virginia Vance
- George Davis
- Glen Cavender
- Wallace Lupino
