= My Stars =

1926 film

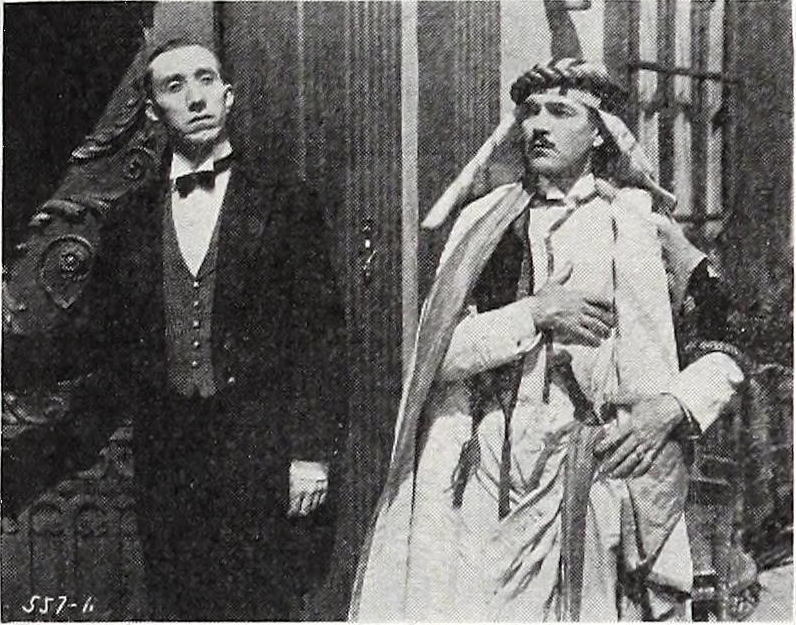
- George Davis and Johnny Arthur
- Directed by: William Goodrich (Roscoe Arbuckle)
- Produced by: Roscoe Arbuckle (uncredited)
- Starring: Johnny Arthur
- Production companies: Goodwill Comedies, Inc.
- Distributed by: Educational Pictures
- Release date: January 17, 1926
- Running time: 12 minutes
- Country: United States
- Languages: Silent; English intertitles

My Stars is a 1926 American silent short comedy film directed by Roscoe Arbuckle.

== Plot ==
According to a synopsis from The Film Daily, "His girl, so the story goes, is an ardent but fickle movie fan. That is, she transfers her adoration from one star to another with every new photograph she receives — and she receives them with each mail. Johnny has a hard time keeping up with them. Just as soon as he dresses a la Valentino and rushes to see her via the sheik method, he finds that her affections have changed and are centered on Doug Fairbanks. When he has donned a Robin Hood get-up, with the aid of several of his mother's house furnishings, he finds that she is now in love with Harold Lloyd. Finally, in desperation, he drags her to his flivver and rides off with her while her affections and his make-up coincide. Outriding the mailman, he wins her love, only to find that she really loves him after all."

== Cast ==
- Johnny Arthur as The Boy
- Florence Lee as His Mother
- Virginia Vance as The Girl
- George Davis as The Butler
- Glen Cavender as The Gardener

== Preservation ==
A 16 mm copy is held by George Eastman House.

== See also ==
- Roscoe Arbuckle filmography
