= May Collins =

American actress (1903–1955)

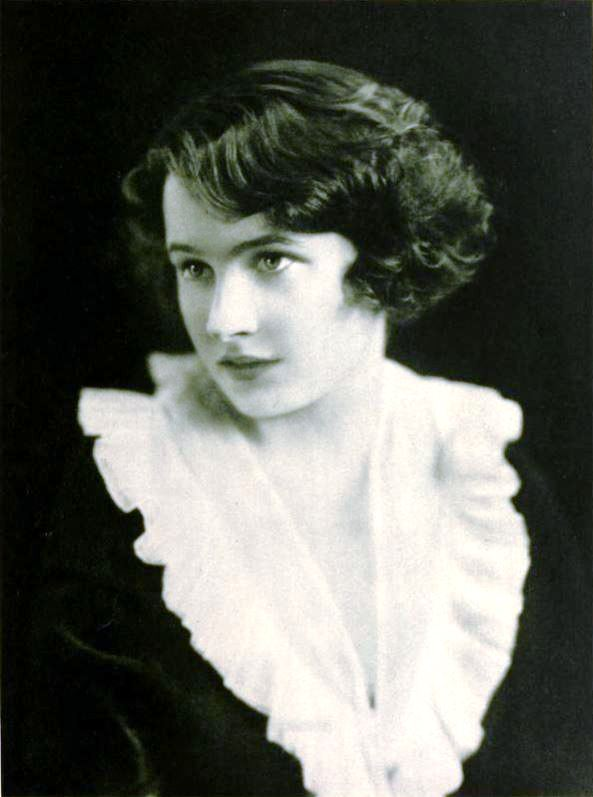
- Collins in 1921
- Born: May 26, 1903; East Orange, New Jersey, U.S.
- Died: May 6, 1955 (aged 51); Fairfield, Connecticut, U.S.
- Occupation: Actress
- Years active: 1921–1945
- Spouse: Edmund E. Thomas (m. 1930)
- Children: 2

May Collins (May 26, 1903 – May 6, 1955) was an American actress on stage and in silent films, was the star in several of the first of the modern romantic comedies to reach the movie screen.

== Biography ==
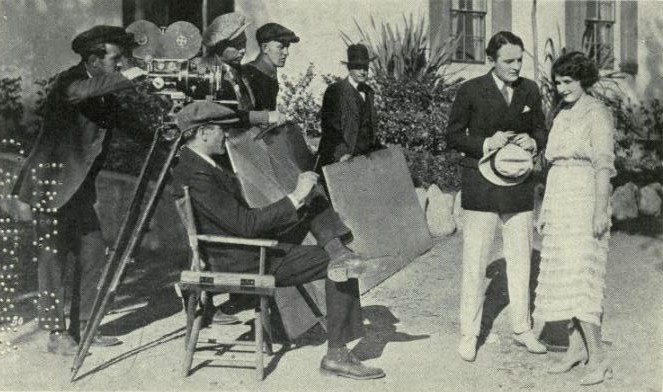
Basil Sydney and May Collins

The daughter of Benjamin Collins and Lillie Smith, she spent most of her early life in New York City. At the age of four years she saw Peter Pan on stage and it was said that after the play she ran out to the stage door to catch a glimpse of the main star, Maude Adams. “I ran up to her calling ‘oh Peter Pan,’” said Collins in an interview, “…Miss Adams raised me up in her arms and gave me a kiss.” May Collins started out as a member of Mrs. August Belmont's dramatic society in New York City. While there she earned several prizes for acting. She was cast in the stage play "The Betrothal."

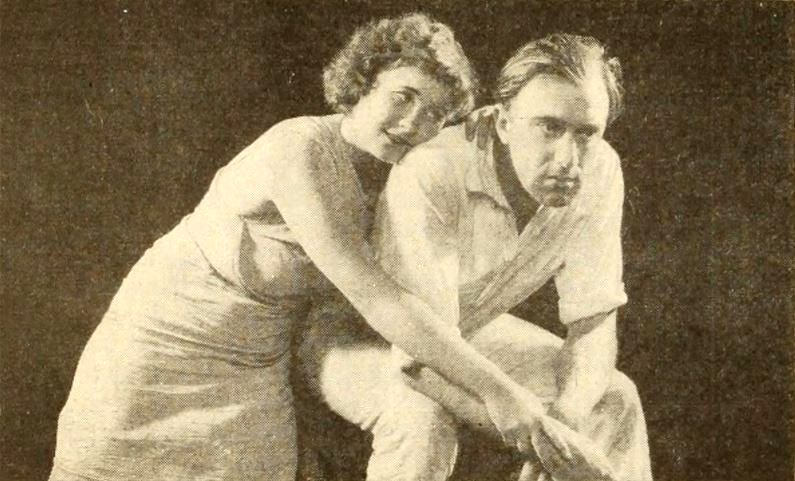
The Shark Master (1921)

Later she joined William A. Brady's forces, and played in Owen Davis melodramas. "The sort you know," laughed Miss May Collins, "where you say: 'You're not the man I married! Get out of the room before I shoot! But gawd, how I love you!'"

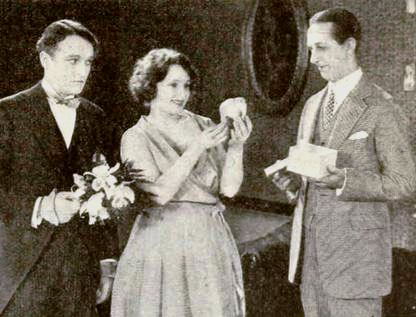
Basil Sydney, May Collins and an unidentified actor in Red Hot Romance (1922)

Collins also had a part in a play with Grace George in "She Would and She Did."

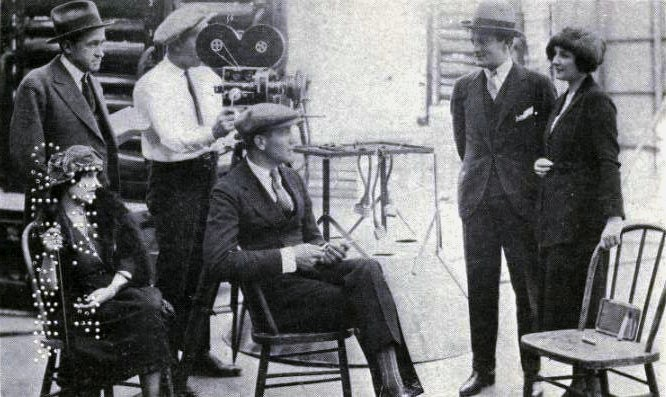
Red Hot Romance (1922) - Makeup Test

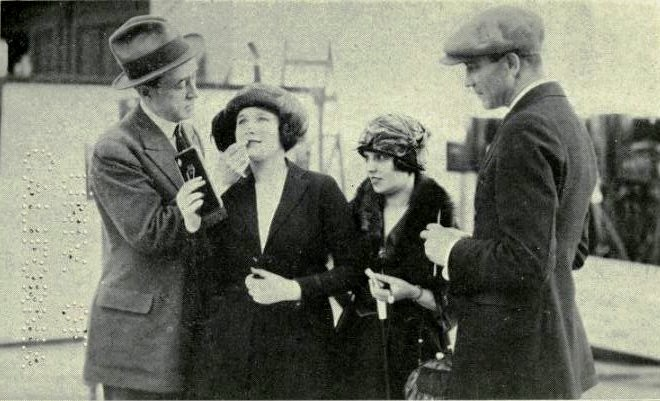
Producer John Emerson, Collins, screenwriter Anita Loos, and director Victor Fleming from Red Hot Romance (1922)

She had top billing in several silent films, All’s Fair in Love and The Shark Master; in 1921; and Red Hot Romance, and Little Eva Ascends in 1922.

Collins' last role, on Broadway, was as Elizabeth Edwards in the original Abe Lincoln in Illinois in October 1939. The play won the 1939 Pulitzer Prize for Drama. Collins later reprised her role in the first TV adaptation of the play in 1945.

She also spent two years in Australia starring in The Trial of Mary Dugan.

== Personal life ==
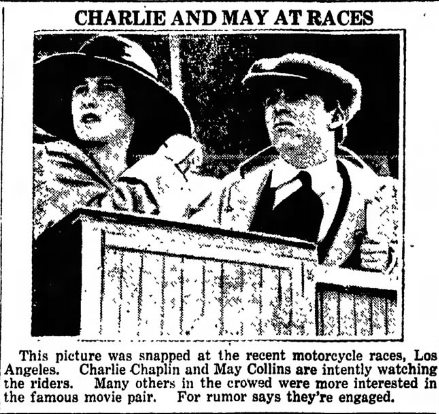
Charlie Chaplin and his paramour May Collins, watching motorcycle races in Los Angeles in 1921.

Collins was briefly engaged to Charlie Chaplin in 1921, but Chaplin broke it off and she ultimately married Edmund Thomas on August 8, 1930. She lost one of her two sons to polio in 1939.

She continued to act on stage in Australia and New York City. She was also in the stage play "Kiss and Tell (play)," which included Kirk Douglas and Joan Caulfield.

Collins worked "seriously" with the March of Dimes.
