= Bert Hunn =

American actor

Bert Hunn (August 21, 1883 – October 3, 1964) was an American actor who starred in silent films in the 1910s.

== Biography ==
Born Albert Washington Hunn in 1883 in Illinois. He starred in around thirty short films for Keystone Studios from 1913, most notably as Keystone Cops. He noticed the smell of smoke in the air, which turned out to be the start of a fire at the Keystone studios lab, and alerted the authorities which meant the majority of negatives for Keystone films were saved. By 1930 he was no longer acting and worked as tile setter and brick layer in Fresno, California.

== Filmography ==
- 1913 A Deaf Burglar Henry Lehrman : Neighbour with Rifle
- 1913 The Two Widows by Henry Lehrman : Wedding Party Guest
- 1913 On His Wedding Day by Mack Sennett : Wedding Guest (not credited)
- 1913 Hide and Seek by Mack Sennett : 2nd Fireman
- 1913 A Life in the Balance by Mack Sennett : Cop (not credited )
- 1913 A Fishy Affair by Mack Sennett : Burglar
- 1913 That Ragtime Band by Mack Sennett : Man in Audience (not credited)
- 1913 Their First Execution by Mack Sennett : Convict
- 1913 Toplitsky and Company by Henry Lehrman : Clothes Customer/Bath House Customer (not credited )
- 1913 The Waiters' Picnic by Mack Sennett : A Cafe Patron
- 1913 Peeping Pete by Mack Sennett : Villager (not credited)
- 1913 A Bandit by Mack Sennett : townsman (not credited)
- 1913 Rastus and the Game Cock by Mack Sennett : Dice Player (not credited )
- 1913 Safe in Jail by Mack Sennett : Villager (not credited )
- 1913 A Chip Off the Old Block by Henry Lehrman : Cop (not credited )
- 1913 Mabel's Dramatic Career by Mack Sennett : Movie Crewman/Man in Audience (not credited )
- 1913 The Janitor by Wilfred Lucas : Cop (not credited )
- 1913 The Speed Kings by Wilfred Lucas : Spectator Next to Mabel (not credited)
- 1913 Fatty at San Diego by George Nichols : Theatre Patron (not credited )
- 1913 A Muddy Romance by Mack Sennett : Water Policeman (not credited )
- 1913 Fatty Joins the Force by George Nichols : Cop at station house (not credited )
- 1913 Cohen Saves the Flag by Mack Sennett : Soldier (not credited )
- 1913 The Gusher by Mack Sennett : 1er acolyte
- 1914 The Under Sheriff by George Nichols : Villager (not credited )
- 1914 A Film Johnnie by George Nichols : Audience Member (not credited )
- 1914 Tango Tangles by Mack Sennett : Guest (not credited )
- 1914 His Favourite Pastime by George Nichols : Bartender (not credited )
- 1914 Cruel, Cruel Love by George Nichols : Tall Ambulance Attendant (not credited )
- 1914 Caught in a Cabaret by Mabel Normand : Cabaret Patron/Garden Party Waiter (not credited )
- 1914 Mabel's Blunder by Mabel Normand : Party guest
- 1915 Love in Armor by Nick Cogley, Francis J. Grandon, Frank Griffin and Mack Sennett
- 1915 Settled at the Seaside by Frank Griffin
- 1915 The Butler's Busted Romance by David Kirkland
- 1915 Only a Messenger Boy by Frank Griffin and Ford Sterling

== See also ==
- Cinema of the United States
