= Listen Lester =

Listen Lester may refer to:

- Listen Lester (musical) 1918 musical featuring Clifton Webb with a score by Harold Orlob
- Listen Lester (film), 1924 silent film based on the musical
