= The Timid Terror =

1926 film

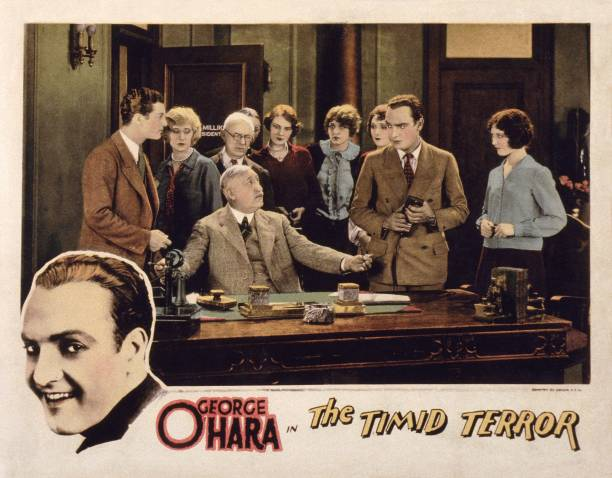
- Theatrical release poster
- Directed by: Del Andrews
- Screenplay by: Gerald Duffy
- Based on: Hi, Taxi by Walter A. Sinclair
- Starring: George O'Hara; Edith Murgatroyd; Doris Hill; Rex Lease; George Nichols; Dot Farley
- Cinematography: Allen G. Siegler
- Production company: Robertson-Cole Pictures Corporation
- Distributed by: Film Booking Offices of America
- Release date: November 7, 1926
- Running time: 50 minutes
- Country: United States

Scenes from the film

The Timid Terror is a 1926 American comedy film directed by Del Andrews and written by Gerald Duffy. The film stars George O'Hara, Edith Murgatroyd, Doris Hill, Rex Lease, George Nichols and Dot Farley. The film was released on November 7, 1926, by Film Booking Offices of America.

== Plot ==
Office workers Talbot Trent and Howard Cramm are both in love with Dorothy Marvin, the secretary to the firm's president, Amos Milliken. Trent is shy and insecure, partly because he does not own a car, while Cramm seeks a promotion to become an out-of-town manager. When Cramm asks Milliken for the position, Milliken rejects him, saying he lacks energy. A friend gives Trent a taxicab, but Dorothy is unimpressed by his using it as a private car. Trent later asks Milliken for the promotion but is fired instead. Determined to prove himself, Trent confronts Milliken and takes him on a reckless taxi ride, convincing him of his energy and initiative. Milliken then gives Trent the managerial position, and Trent wins Dorothy's affection.

== Cast ==
- George O'Hara as Talbot Trent
- Edith Murgatroyd as Mrs. Trent
- Doris Hill as Dorothy Marvin
- Rex Lease as Howard Cramm
- George Nichols as Amos Milliken
- Dot Farley as Mrs. Milliken
