= Darwin Was Right =

1924 film directed by Lewis Seiler

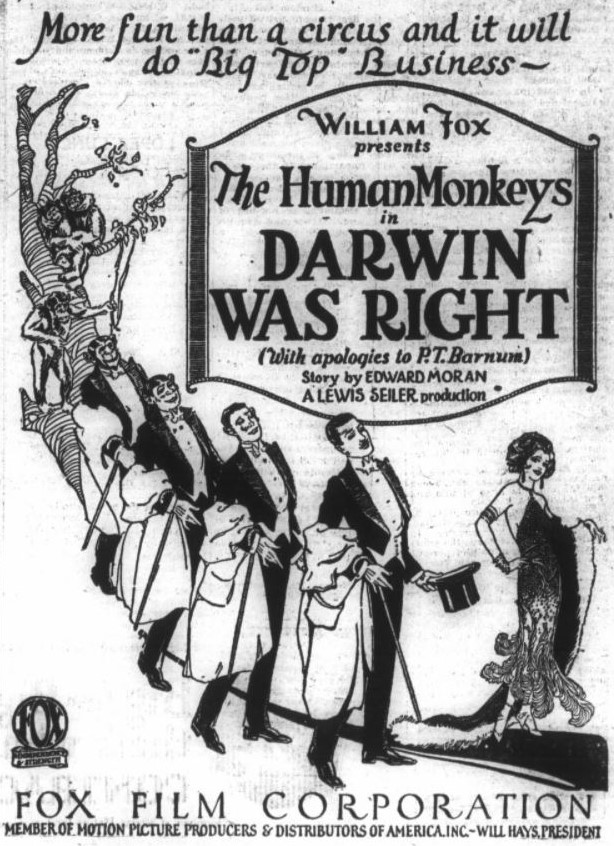
- Advertisement
- Directed by: Lewis Seiler
- Screenplay by: Eddie Moran
- Starring: Nell Brantley; George O'Hara; Stanley Blystone; Dan Mason; Lon Poff; Bud Jamison
- Cinematography: Jay Turner
- Production company: Fox Film Corporation
- Distributed by: Fox Film Corporation
- Release date: October 26, 1924
- Running time: 50 minutes
- Country: United States
- Language: Silent (English intertitles)

Darwin Was Right is a 1924 American comedy film directed by Lewis Seiler and written by Eddie Moran. The film stars Nell Brantley, George O'Hara, Stanley Blystone, Dan Mason, Lon Poff and Bud Jamison. The film was released on October 26, 1924, by Fox Film Corporation.

== Plot ==
As described in a review in a film magazine:

Professor Henry Baldwin, experimenting to obtain an elixir of youth, is just about to sample it with his secretary, Egbert, and his black butler, Alexander, when they are spirited away and put in an insane asylum by Lawson, who seeks to control the professor’s estate. A dog chasing a cat rushes in through the open window and overturns his little wagon, spilling three babies on the floor. Baldwin’s daughter Alice and sister Priscilla see them and believe the professor has taken an overdose. Alice phones to her sweetheart Robert, who rushes over. By this time the children in charge of the babies have recovered them, but three chimpanzees escaping from a circus have taken their places. Believing an overdose has changed the professor and his companions back to monkeys, they are installed in the family. The trio escape from the asylum and return home; three keepers come after them. Then follows a series of comedy mixups between the men, monkeys, and guards, ending in everything being finally straightened out.

== Cast ==
- Nell Brantley as Alice
- George O'Hara as Robert Lee
- Stanley Blystone as Courtney Lawson
- Dan Mason as Henry Baldwin
- Lon Poff as Egbert Swift
- Bud Jamison as Alexander
- Merta Sterling as Liza
- Nora Cecil as Aunt Priscilla
- David Kirby as The Crook
- Carmencita Johnson as Baby (uncredited)
- Joan Meredith as Undetermined Secondary Role (uncredited)
- Akka the chimpanzee

== Preservation ==
With no copies of Darwin Was Right located in any film archives, it is a lost film.
