= Collegiate (1926 film) =

1926 film directed by Del Andrews

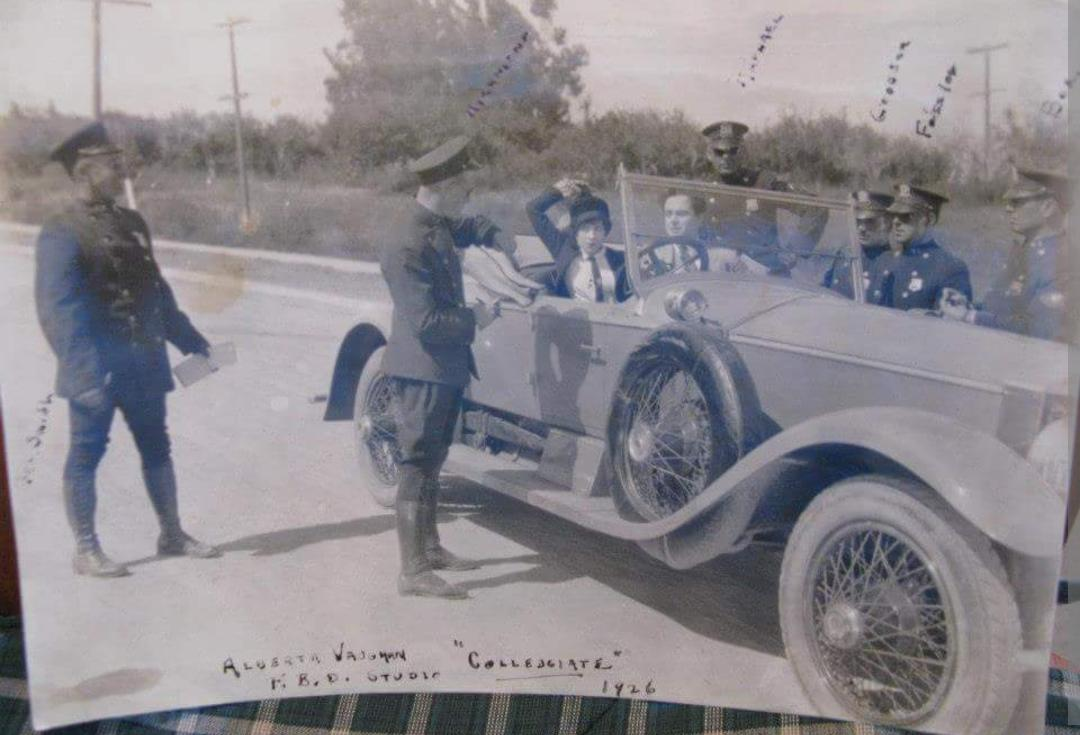
- Directed by: Del Andrews
- Written by: James Gruen; Jean DuPont Miller
- Produced by: Joseph P. Kennedy
- Starring: Alberta Vaughn; Donald Keith; John Steppling
- Cinematography: Jules Cronjager
- Production company: Robertson-Cole Pictures Corporation
- Distributed by: Film Booking Offices of America; Ideal Films (UK)
- Release date: August 29, 1926
- Running time: 50 minutes
- Country: United States
- Languages: Silent; English intertitles

Collegiate is a 1926 American silent romantic comedy film directed by Del Andrews and starring Alberta Vaughn, Donald Keith and John Steppling.

== Cast ==
- Alberta Vaughn as Patricia Steele
- Donald Keith as Jimmy Baxter
- John Steppling as Mr. Steele
- Alys Murrell as Iris Vale
- William Austin as G. Horace Crumbleigh
- Frank Adams as Bumpter Smith
- Charles Cruz as Piggy

== Bibliography ==
- Munden, Kenneth White. The American Film Institute Catalog of Motion Pictures Produced in the United States, Part 1. University of California Press, 1997.
