= Some Nerve =

1913 film

- Directed by: Mack Sennett
- Starring: Fatty Arbuckle
- Release date: December 26, 1913
- Country: United States
- Languages: Silent; English intertitles

Some Nerve is a 1913 short comedy film directed by Mack Sennett and featuring Fatty Arbuckle. In the story, a married man (Ford Sterling) is "caught in a compromising situation with a scheming girl" (Peggy Pearce).

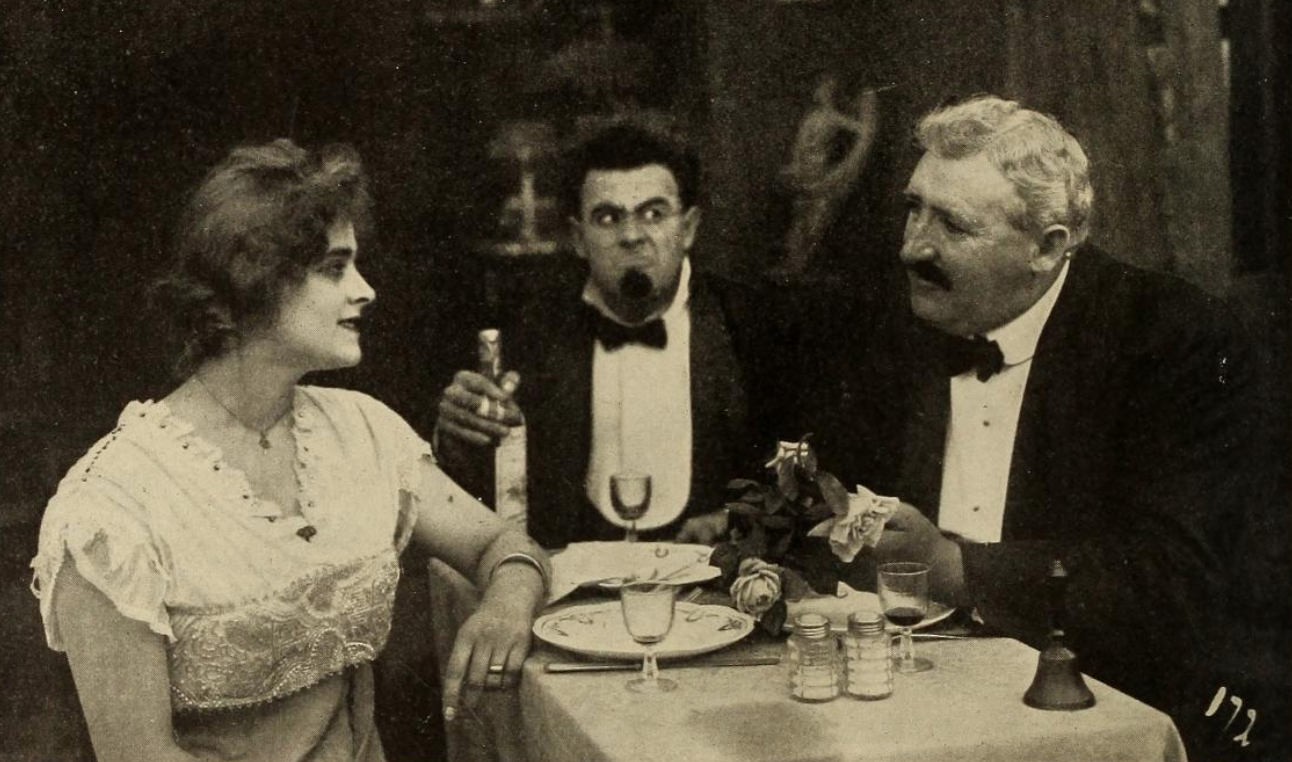
A scene from Some Nerve (1913)

== Cast ==
- Roscoe "Fatty" Arbuckle
- Dot Farley
- George Nichols
- Ford Sterling
- Peggy Pearce

== See also ==
- List of American films of 1913
- Roscoe Arbuckle filmography
- Mack Sennett filmography
