= Cohen Saves the Flag =

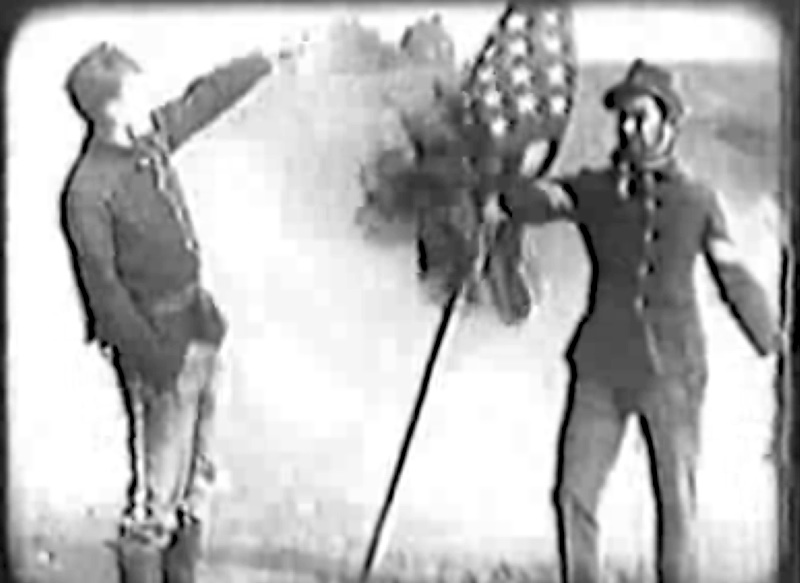
- Scene from the film
- The Jewish Soldier
- Directed by: Mack Sennett
- Produced by: Mack Sennett
- Starring: Ford Sterling; Mabel Normand; Henry Lehrman
- Production company: The Keystone Film Company
- Distributed by: Mutual Film Corporation
- Release date: November 27, 1913
- Running time: One reel
- Country: United States
- Language: Silent

Cohen Saves the Flag is a 1913 American comedy silent film directed and produced by Mack Sennett, and starring Ford Sterling and Mabel Normand.

== Plot ==
Cohen (Ford Sterling) and his rival Goldberg (Henry Lehrman) enlist in the Union army during the American Civil War. Goldberg receives a lieutenant's commission while Cohen becomes a sergeant. During the Battle of Gettysburg, Cohen inadvertently becomes a hero when he tosses back an enemy hand grenade and raises a fallen flag in the midst of the conflict. Goldberg conspires to have Cohen shot by a firing squad, but Cohen's girlfriend Rebecca (Mabel Normand) rides to the rescue and details Cohen's battlefield bravery. Cohen is hailed for his valor and later exacts revenge on Goldberg.

== Cast ==
- Ford Sterling - Sgt. Cohen
- Mabel Normand - Mabel
- Henry Lehrman - Lt. Goldberg
- Nick Cogley - The General
- Charles Avery - Field Officer
- Bill Hauber - Soldier
- Bert Hunn - Soldier
- Beverly Griffith - Soldier

== Production ==
Cohen Saves the Flag was a part of Mack Sennett's "Cohen" series that used a burlesque of Jewish stereotypes for its humor. Typical of the film's comedy is having Cohen chased into a pigsty, where he views the porcine residents with nervous apprehension – this is an obvious riff on the Jewish prohibition on eating pork.

Sennett set up his production company for Cohen Saves the Flag alongside Thomas H. Ince’s epic The Battle of Gettysburg. Sennett staged his battlefield scenes on the edge of Ince's production, capturing Ince's grand wartime sequences for his film while keeping the Cohen Saves the Flag cast discreetly out of Ince's camera range. Today, The Battle of Gettysburg is considered a lost film, and all that remains of that endeavor are the battlefield scenes appropriated by Sennett for his slapstick film.
