= A Friendly Husband =

1923 film by John G. Blystone

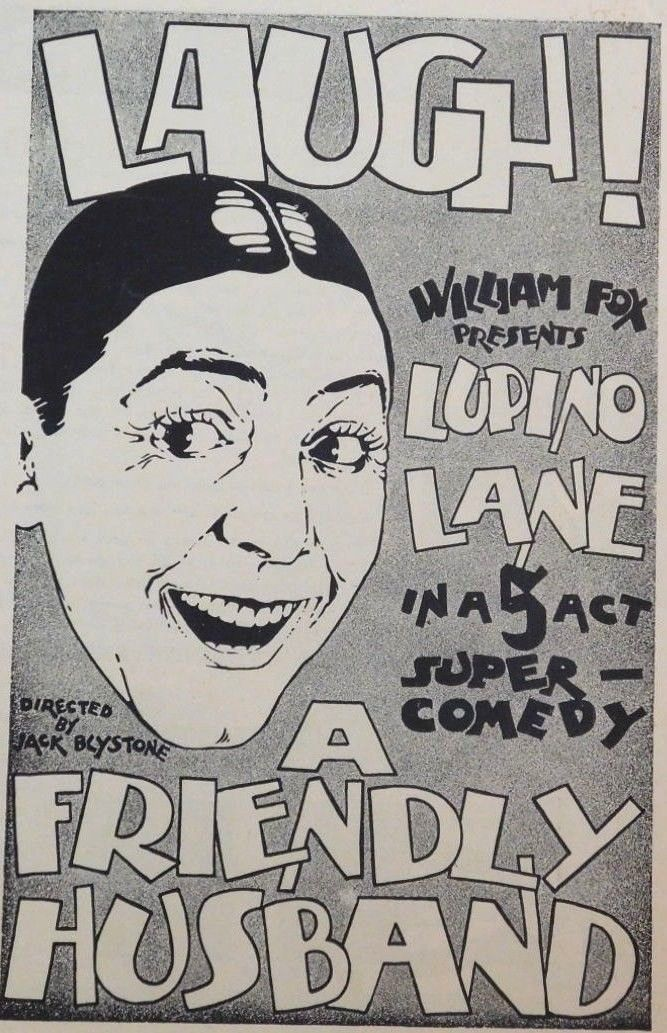
- Theatrical release poster
- Directed by: John G. Blystone
- Written by: John G. Blystone (story); Hampton Del Ruth; Ralph Spence (titles)
- Starring: Lupino Lane; Alberta Vaughn; Eva Thatcher
- Cinematography: Jay Turner
- Edited by: Ralph Spence
- Production company: Fox Film Corporation
- Distributed by: Fox Film Corporation
- Release date: January 1, 1923
- Running time: 5 reels
- Country: United States
- Language: Silent (English intertitles)

A Friendly Husband is a 1923 American silent comedy film directed by John G. Blystone and starring Lupino Lane, Alberta Vaughn, and Eva Thatcher. The film was released by Fox Film Corporation on January 1, 1923.

== Plot ==
As described in a film magazine, on a hot summer day Friend Husband invests in a camping outfit to be hitched to his trusty automobile and prepares to get his wife Tootsie and go away for a little vacation. When he arrives home, he discovers that her mother has collected her brood and come to pay a visit. They all immediately pile into the car and start off for a nice cool place in the country, leaving the husband to walk behind them. The camping outfit has every convenience and is worked by push buttons. While Tootsie, her mother, and the rest of the family are enjoying the outing, Friend Husband is left with all of the work. The mischievous younger brother of the wife insists on playing with the buttons and beds, chairs, and tables that work off hinges swing wildly through the air. Later, a band of robbers attack them, but Friend Husband finally captures them all and receives an award. Through this he gains the respect of his Mother-in-law and the renewed assurances of his wife's affection.

== Cast ==
- Lupino Lane as Friend Husband
- Alberta Vaughn as Tootsie, Friend Wife
- Eva Thatcher as Mother-in-law

== Preservation ==
A print of A Friendly Husband with Czech intertitles survives at the Museum of Modern Art.
