= Peggy Pearce =

American actress

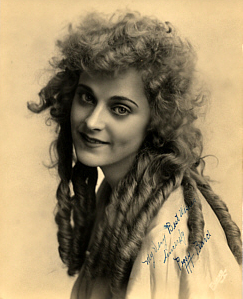
- Born: Velma Pearce; June 4, 1894; Long Beach, California, U.S.
- Died: February 26, 1975 (aged 80); Los Angeles, California, U.S.
- Years active: 1913–1920
- Spouse: Arthur H. Klein (m. 1920; died 1955)
- Children: 1

Peggy Pearce (born Velma Pearce; June 4, 1894 – February 26, 1975) was an American film actress of the silent era. She worked primarily in short subjects at the L-KO Kompany and Keystone Studios. She appeared alongside stars including Charles Chaplin, Roscoe Arbuckle, Billie Ritchie, Slim Summerville, Ford Sterling, and Mabel Normand.

== Selected filmography ==
- The Sea Wolf (1920 film)
- A Tokyo Siren (1920)
- A Good Loser (1920)
- False Evidence (1919)
- Ace of the Saddle (1919)
- Sex (1920)
- Love Madness (1920)
- The Red-Haired Cupid (1918)
- The Golden Fleece (1918)
- His Bread and Butter (1916)
- His Favorite Pastime (1914)
- Tango Tangles (1914)
- A Film Johnnie (1914)
- Between Showers (1914)
- Hearts and Sword (1914)
- Peeping Pete (1913)
- Some Nerve (1913)
- The Gusher (1913)
- Fatty at San Diego (1913)
- A Quiet Little Wedding (1913)
