= The Adorable Deceiver =

1926 film by Phil Rosen

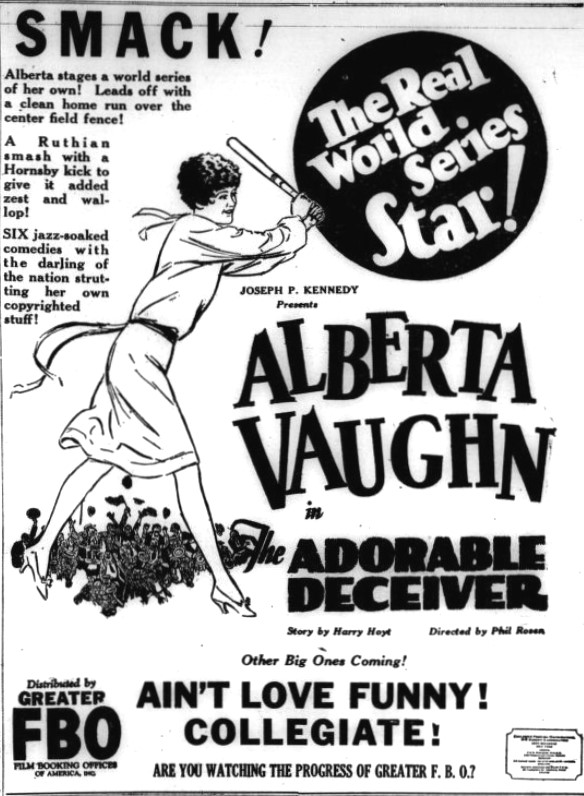
- Advertisement
- Directed by: Phil Rosen
- Written by: Doris Anderson (continuity)
- Based on: "Triple Trouble" by Harry O. Hoyt
- Produced by: Robertson-Cole Pictures
- Starring: Alberta Vaughn
- Cinematography: Roy H. Klaffki
- Distributed by: Film Booking Offices of America (FBO)
- Release date: October 24, 1926
- Running time: 57 minutes
- Country: United States
- Language: Silent (English intertitles)

The Adorable Deceiver is a 1926 American silent comedy film, starring Alberta Vaughn as a princess, forced to flee her home country with her father King Nicholas to New York City, where they make their way as well-meaning con artists.

== Plot ==
Nicholas, the monarch of the small Balkan nation Santa Maria, is compelled to flee a revolution, taking refuge in America with his daughter, Princess Sylia, who brings along the crown jewels. They reside discreetly in a luxurious suite in a New York City hotel, but selling the jewels yields insufficient funds to maintain their lifestyle, leading them to seek lodging at Mrs. Schrapp's boarding house. Mrs. Schrapp helps King Nicholas secure employment, but during his absence, agents from the Republic of Santa Maria arrive. Sylvia flees and spends the night in a car at an automobile showroom, where she poses as a skilled car salesperson to Tom Pettibone and his mother. Tom, eager to enter high society, becomes enamored with Sylvia and introduces her as the Princess of Albania at a country club event. Meanwhile, two impostors, Jim and Flo Doyle, also pose as the King and Queen of Santa Maria at the event.

== Cast ==
- Alberta Vaughn as Princess Sylvia
- Daniel Makarenko as King Nicholas
- Harland Tucker as Tom Pettibone
- Frank Leigh as Jim Doyle
- Jane Thomas as Flo Doyle
- Cora Williams as Mrs. Pettibone
- Rosa Gore as Mrs. Schrapp
- Sheila Hayward as Bellona

== Preservation ==
With no prints of The Adorable Deceiver located in any film archives, it is a lost film.
