= Backstage (1927 film) =

1927 film

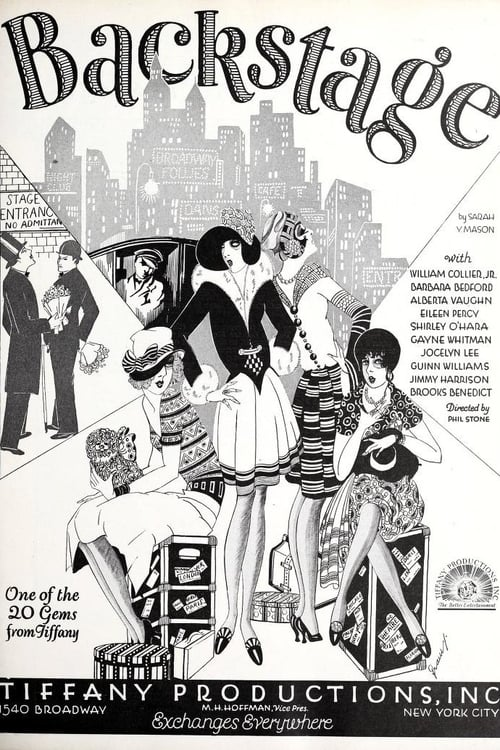
- Directed by: Phil Goldstone
- Written by: Sarah Y. Mason; Jack Natteford
- Starring: William Collier Jr. Barbara Bedford; Alberta Vaughn
- Cinematography: Joseph A. Dubray; E. Fox Walker
- Edited by: Leroy O. Lodwig
- Production company: Tiffany Pictures
- Distributed by: Tiffany Pictures
- Release date: April 1, 1927
- Running time: 65 minutes
- Country: United States
- Languages: Silent; English intertitles

Backstage is a 1927 American silent comedy film directed by Phil Goldstone and starring William Collier Jr., Barbara Bedford and Alberta Vaughn. It was produced and distributed by the independent studio Tiffany Pictures.

== Synopsis ==
Four chorus girls find themselves out of work when their show goes bust while still in rehearsals. One of them goes to live at the apartment of the manager, leading her boyfriend to mistakenly believe that she is now a kept woman.

== Cast ==
- William Collier Jr. as Owen Mackay
- Barbara Bedford as Julia Joyce
- Alberta Vaughn as Myrtle McGinnis
- Eileen Percy as Fanny
- Shirley O'Hara as Jane
- Gayne Whitman as Frank Carroll
- Jocelyn Lee as Flo
- Guinn 'Big Boy' Williams as Mike Donovan
- James Harrison as Charlie
- Brooks Benedict as Harry
- Lincoln Plumer as Mr. Durkin
- Marcia Harris as Landlady
- Louise Carver as Referee
- John Batten as Eddie

== Bibliography ==
- Munden, Kenneth White. The American Film Institute Catalog of Motion Pictures Produced in the United States, Part 1. University of California Press, 1997.
