= Jay Turner (cinematographer) =

American cinematographer

- Born: Jay Robert Turner; May 14, 1896; Martinsville, Indiana, USA
- Died: October 29, 1960 (aged 64); Los Angeles, California, USA
- Occupation: Cinematographer

Jay Turner was an American cinematographer who worked in Hollywood primarily during the 1920s. He frequently collaborated with actor-director Lupino Lane.

== Biography ==
Jay was born in Martinsville, Indiana, to Harry Turner and Sophinda Williams. The family relocated to Los Angeles when Jay was young, and by 1920, he was working at a film studio as a cameraman. He married Katherine Potter in 1924. His last known project as cinematographer was 1929's Battling Sisters. After that, he appears to have become the building manager for a Hollywood apartment building owned by Lupino Lane.

== Selected filmography ==
- Battling Sisters (1929)
- Good Night Nurse (1929)
- Howling Hollywood (1929)
- Be My King (1928)
- Roaming Romeo (1928)
- Fandango (1928)
- Sword Points (1928)
- Hello Sailor (1927)
- From a Cabby's Seat (1926)
- Darwin Was Right (1924)
- A Friendly Husband (1923)
