= Alberta Vaughn =

American actress (1904–1992)

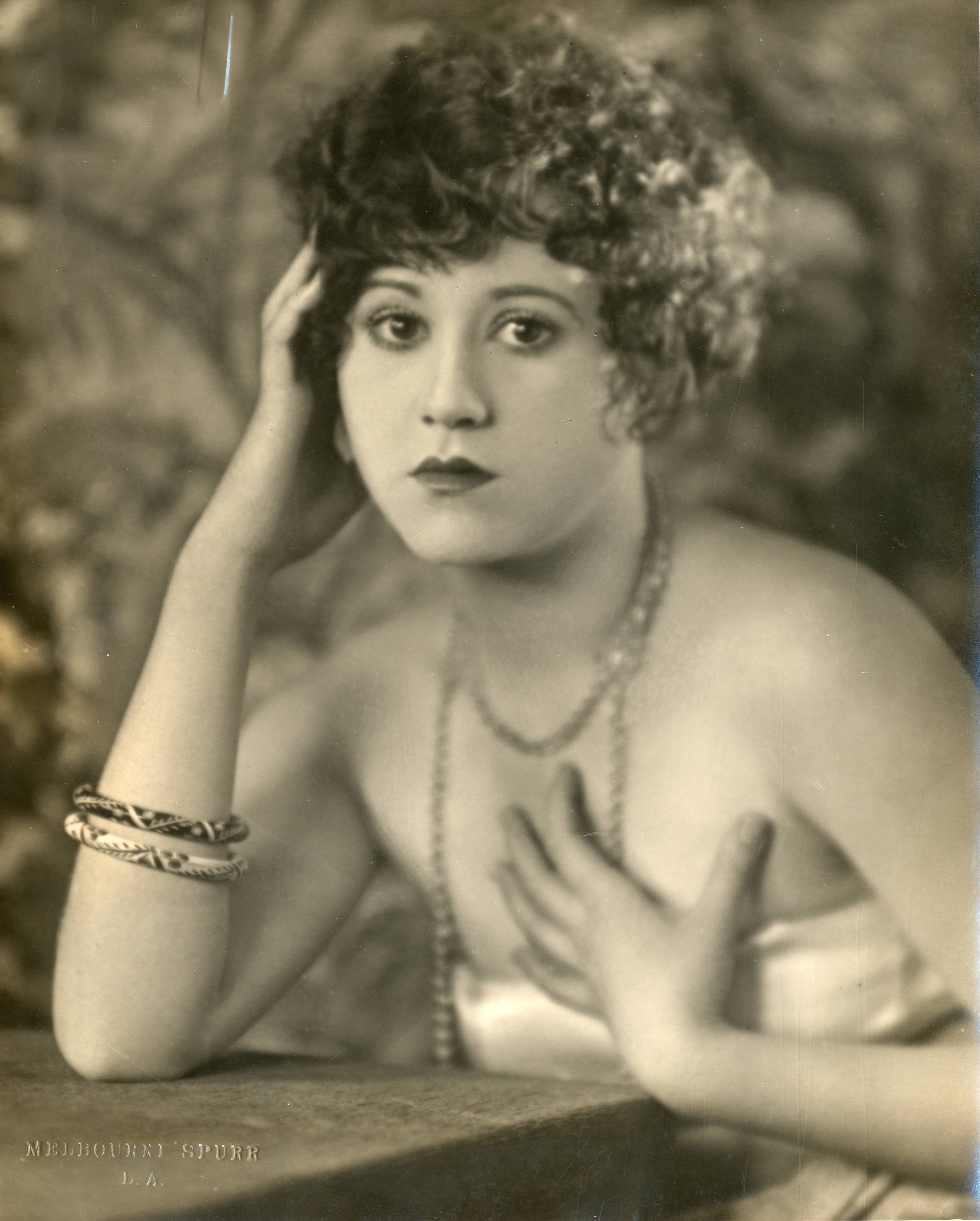
- Vaughn in 1923
- Born: June 27, 1904; Ashland, Kentucky, U.S.
- Died: April 26, 1992 (aged 87); Studio City, Los Angeles, California, U.S.
- Occupation: Actress
- Years active: 1921–1935
- Spouse(s): Joseph Egil or Egli (1934–1943, divorce); John R. Thompson or Thomas (1948–?)

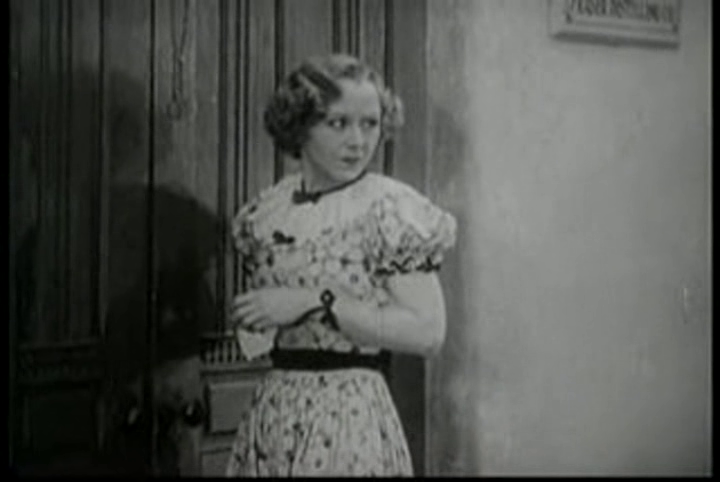
1934

Alberta Vaughn (June 27, 1904 – April 26, 1992) was an American actress in silent motion pictures and early Western sound films. She appeared in some 130 motion pictures.

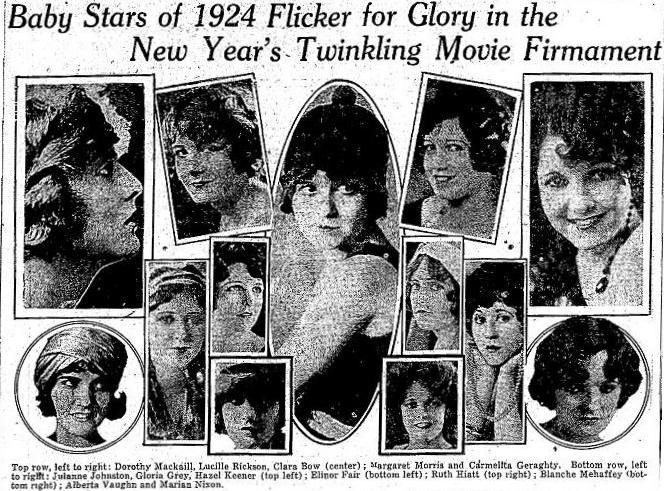
1924

== Early years ==
Born in Ashland, Kentucky, Vaughn was the sister of actress Adamae Vaughn.

== Career ==
Vaughn was a selected as a WAMPAS Baby Star along with Clara Bow and Dorothy Mackaill in 1924. Her movie career began in 1921 and continued until 1935. She often co-starred with actor Al Cook in comedies. She made Randy Rides Alone (1934) with John Wayne. She was a member of the cast of Intermission, a play by Irving Kaye Davis, in September 1932. The production opened in San Francisco and co-starred Madge Bellamy and Judith Voselli. Vaughn made her last onscreen appearance in the 1935 film The Live Wire opposite Richard Talmadge.

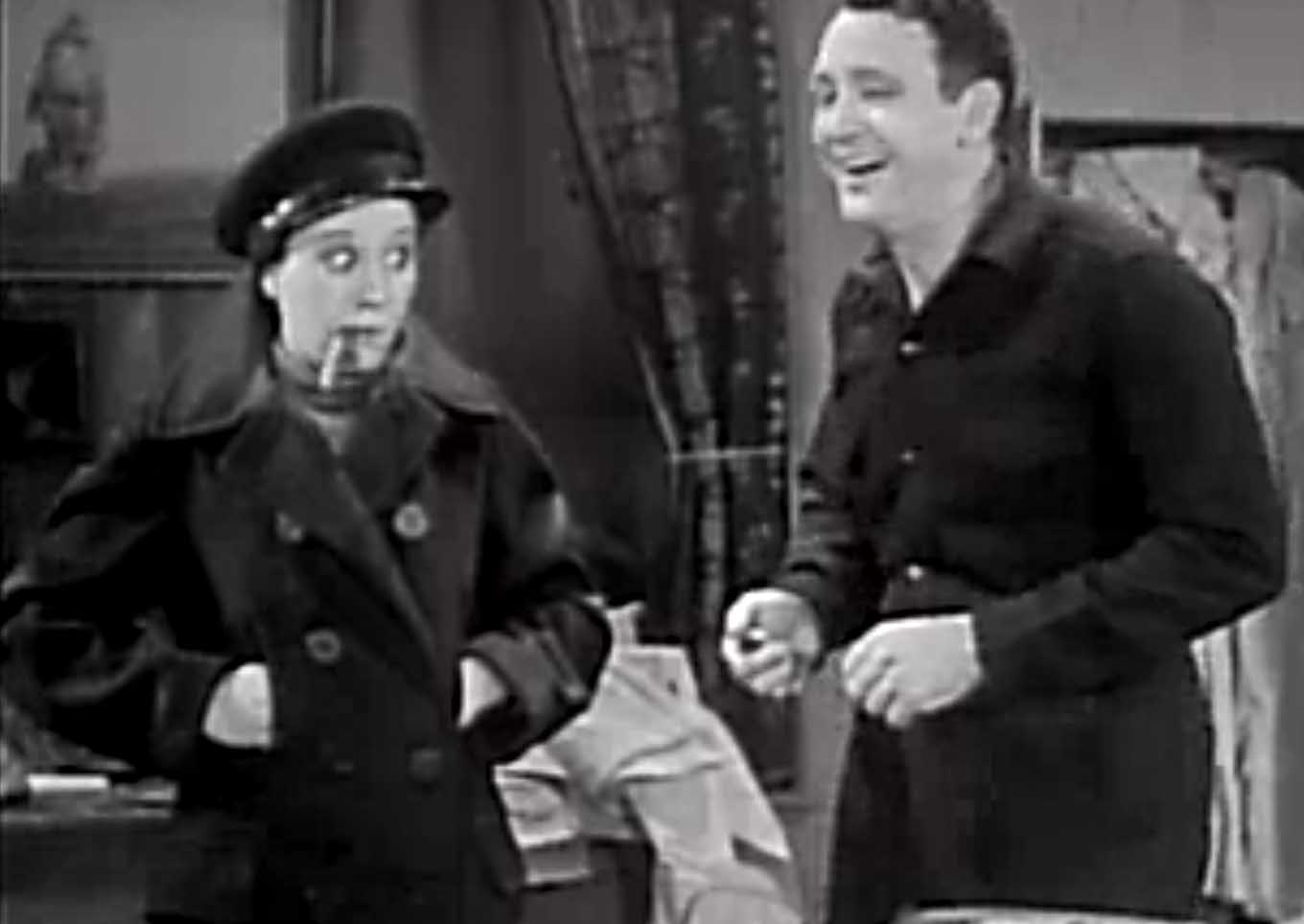
Alberta Vaughn and Richard Talmadge share a cigar in The Live Wire (1935).

She retired from acting in 1935 at age 31.

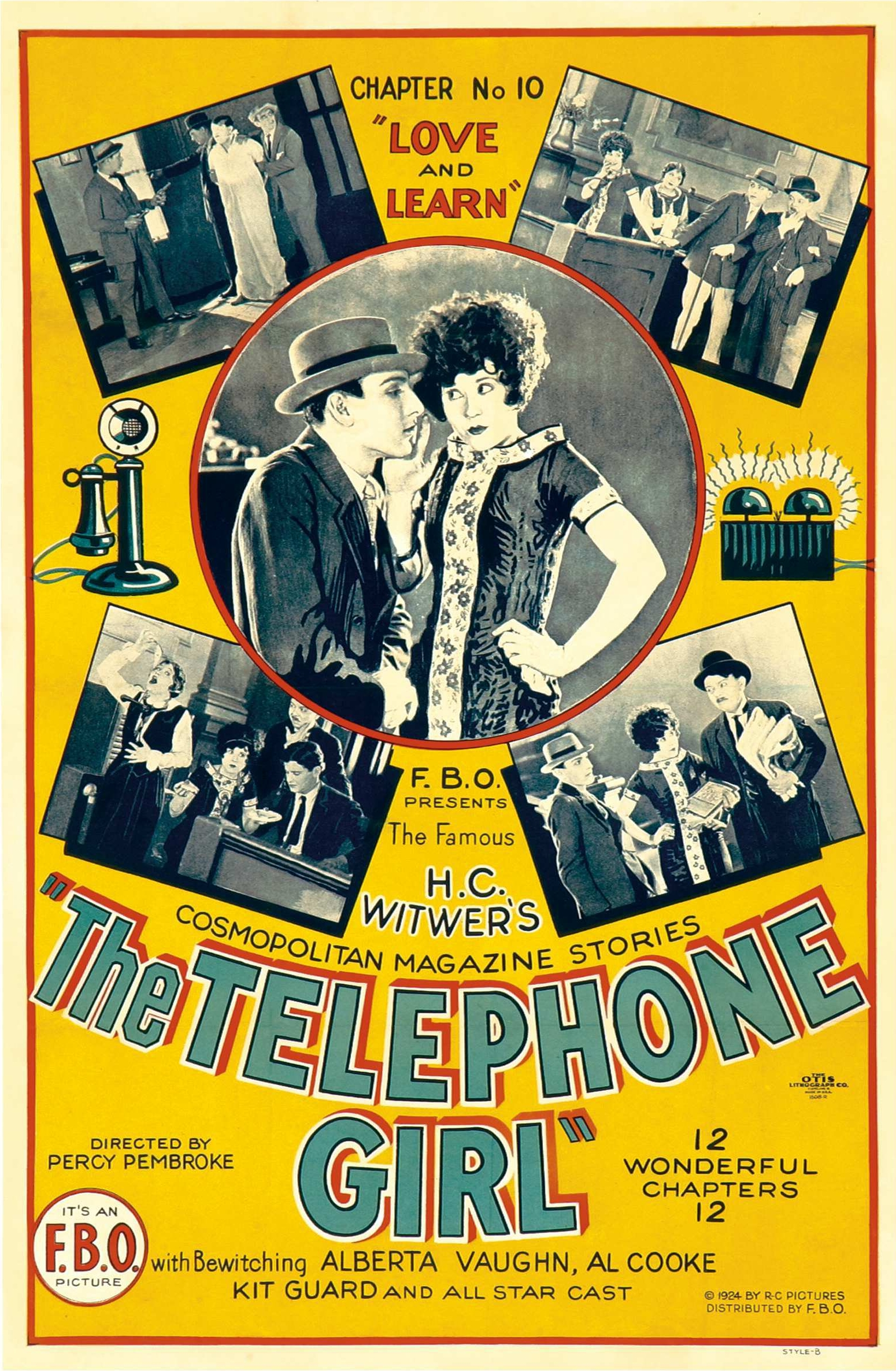

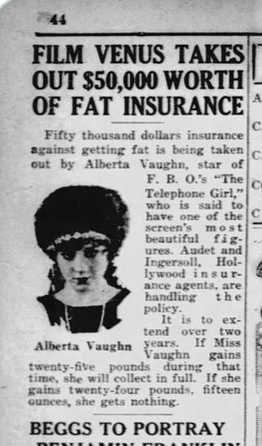
Newspaper article about fat insurance, 1924

== Personal life and death ==
=== Engagements and marriages ===
In 1926, Vaughn became engaged to actor and leading man Grant Withers. After announcing their engagement in October 1926, Vaughn traveled to New York to film some talking sequences for a movie she was filming in Hollywood. Withers broke off the engagement after he discovered Vaughn went out with friends to nightclubs in New York. Immediately after the wedding was called off, Vaughn returned to Hollywood as the fiancée of noted attorney (later agent and producer), Charles K. Feldman.

Vaughn announced her engagement to William Laitt, a "wealthy young steel man", on August 26, 1928.

On April 8, 1934, Vaughn wed assistant casting director Joseph Egil of Paramount Pictures. (Other sources give the last name as Egli.) They were married in Yuma, Arizona. The couple was divorced on August 11, 1943.

In 1948 she married roofing contractor John R. Thompson. (The trade publication Billboard recorded his name as John R. Thomas, reporting in its July 10, 1948, issue that Thomas and she were married June 23 in Los Angeles.)

=== Legal problems ===
Already in trouble for drunk driving, Vaughn received a six-month jail sentence on May 13, 1946, for violating probation. Judge William R. McKay in Los Angeles revoked her probation and handed down the sentence after he did not accept her explanation that some sailors who rode in her car left a half-full bottle of whiskey in the vehicle.

Another probation revocation and sentence occurred in 1948. She was sentenced to a year in jail for marrying John Robert (Thomas) Thompson in violation of her terms of probation for drunk driving. Those terms "required that she consult with authorities before marrying."

In March 1949, Vaughn was jailed on an intoxication violation in Pasadena. She chose incarceration instead of paying a $25 fine. Her jail term was 12 1/2 days. A previous drunken charge, then pending, would have added an additional four months to her sentence. Vaughn was arrested after an argument with her husband, John R. Thompson. The incident followed her release after serving eight months of a one-year sentence on the earlier instance.

=== Death ===
Vaughn died of cancer in Studio City, California, on April 26, 1992, aged 87. She was buried in Valhalla Memorial Park Cemetery.

== Selected filmography ==
Year	Title	Role	Notes
1921	Stop Kidding		
1922	Women First		Credited as Alberta Vaughan
1923	A Friendly Husband	Tootsie, Friend Wife	
1923	Down to the Sea in Shoes		
1924	Picking Peaches	His Wife	*short
1924	Fire When Ready	Peggy Davis	
1925	The Pacemakers	Soda Jerk	
1925	The Sleuth	His Wife	
1926	Collegiate	Patricia Steele	
1926	The Adorable Deceiver	Princess Sylvia	
1927	Ain't Love Funny?	Helen Brice	
1927	Backstage	Myrtle McGinnis	
1927	The Romantic Age	Sally	
1928	Skyscraper	Jane	
1928	Forbidden Hours	Nina	
1929	Molly and Me	Peggy	
1929	Noisy Neighbors	Mary Carstairs	
1929	Points West	Dorothy	
1930	The Setting Son		
1930	Eventually, But Not Now		
1931	Wild Horse	Alice Hall	
1931	The Spell of the Circus	Marie Wallace	
1931	Working Girls	Violet	
1932	Love in High Gear	Betty	
1932	Midnight Morals	Katy Dolan	
1933	Alimony Madness	Mary	
1933	Dance Hall Hostess	Myra	
1934	Randy Rides Alone	Sally Rogers	
1935	The Laramie Kid	Peggy Bland	
1935	The Live Wire	Madge King	
