= Casey of the Coast Guard =

1926 film

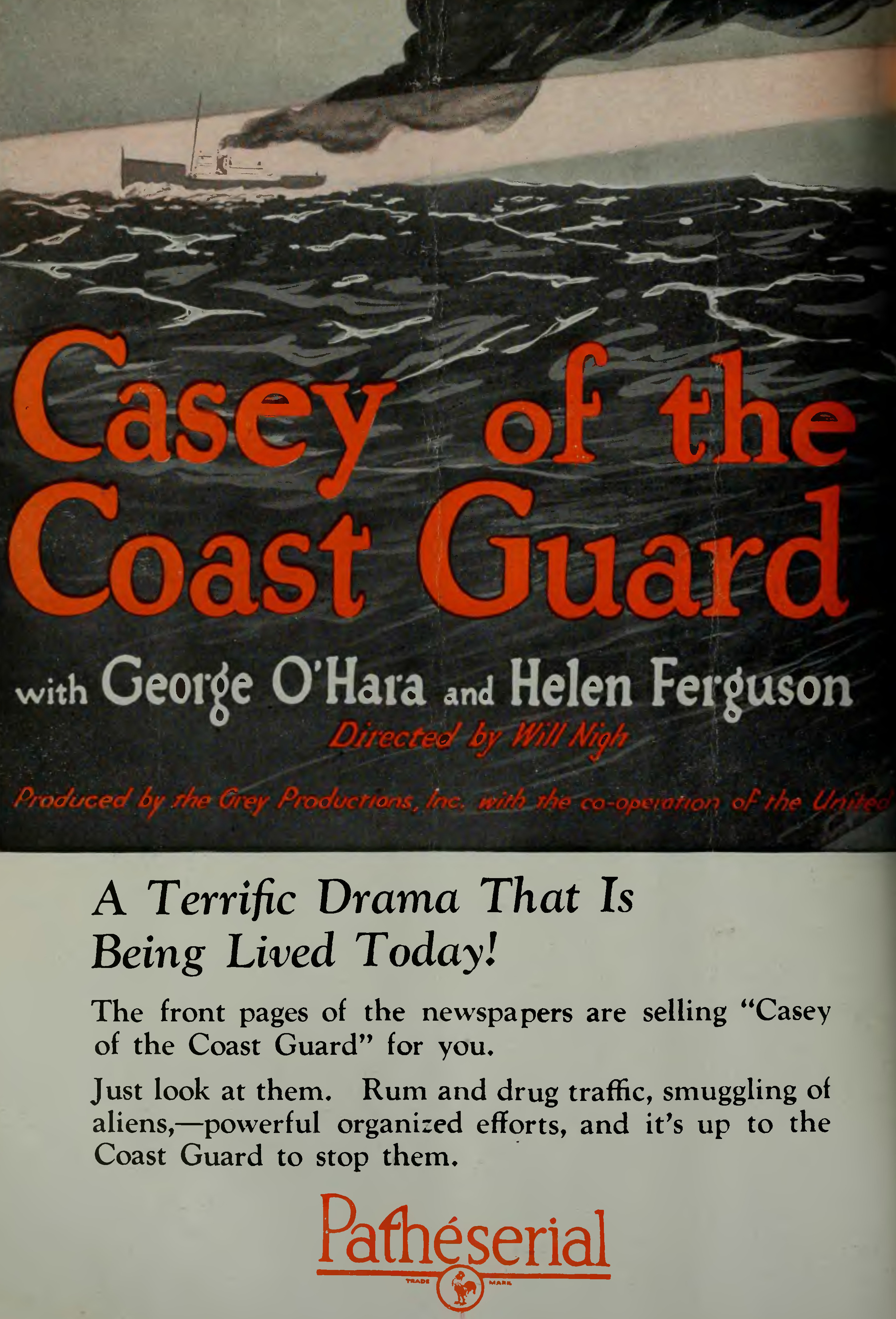
- Directed by: William Nigh
- Written by: Lewis Allen Browne
- Produced by: Schuyler E. Grey
- Starring: George O'Hara; Helen Ferguson
- Distributed by: Pathé Exchange
- Release date: February 14, 1926 (United States)
- Running time: 10 episodes
- Country: United States
- Languages: Silent; English intertitles

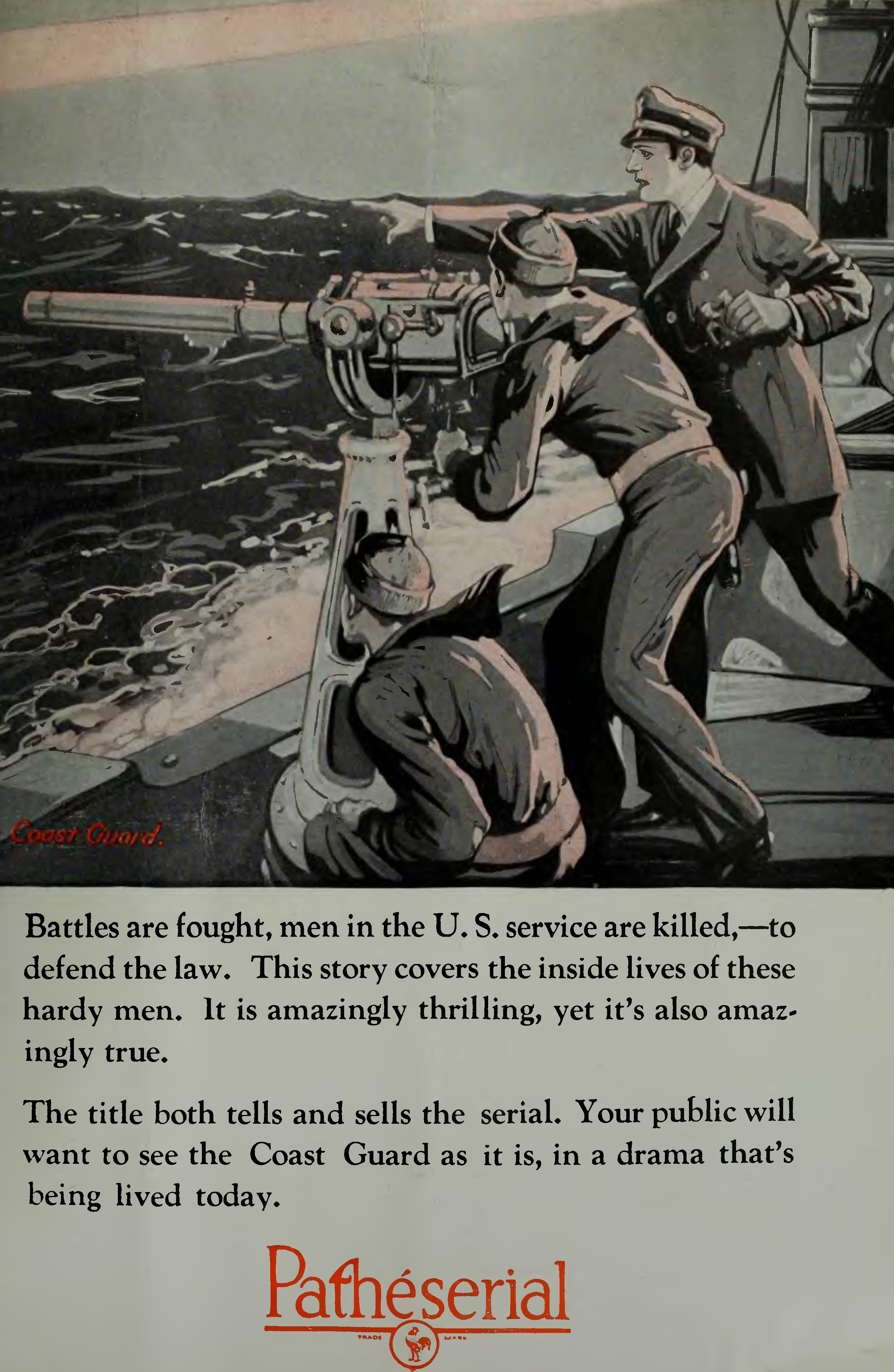
Casey of the Coast Guard ad in The Film Daily, 1926

Casey of the Coast Guard was a 1926 American silent action film serial released in ten chapters, directed by William Nigh and written by Lewis Allen Browne. The film is now presumed lost.

== Plot ==
John Casey (George O'Hara) is a Coast Guard officer stationed on Long Island Sound. He is both hated and feared by a band of smugglers headed by Diamond Kate. The serial unfolds with the smuggler gang choosing their strike against Casey on the night of the Cadet Coast Guard Ball. Casey’s brother Frank answers the call that night and is killed in action against the smugglers. Casey vows to avenge the death of his brother.

== Cast ==
- George O'Hara as Ensign John Casey
- Helen Ferguson as Doris Warren
- J. Barney Sherry as John Warren
- Coit Albertson as Malverni

== Chapter titles ==
1. The Smugglers' Ruse
2. Shot In The Dark
3. Watchful Waiting
4. Under Suspicion
5. The Gas Chamber
6. Shot From The Depths
7. Contraband Channels
8. Smuggled Aliens
9. Meshes of The Law
10. Caught In The Net

== See also ==
- List of lost films
