= Dot Farley =

American actress (1881–1971)

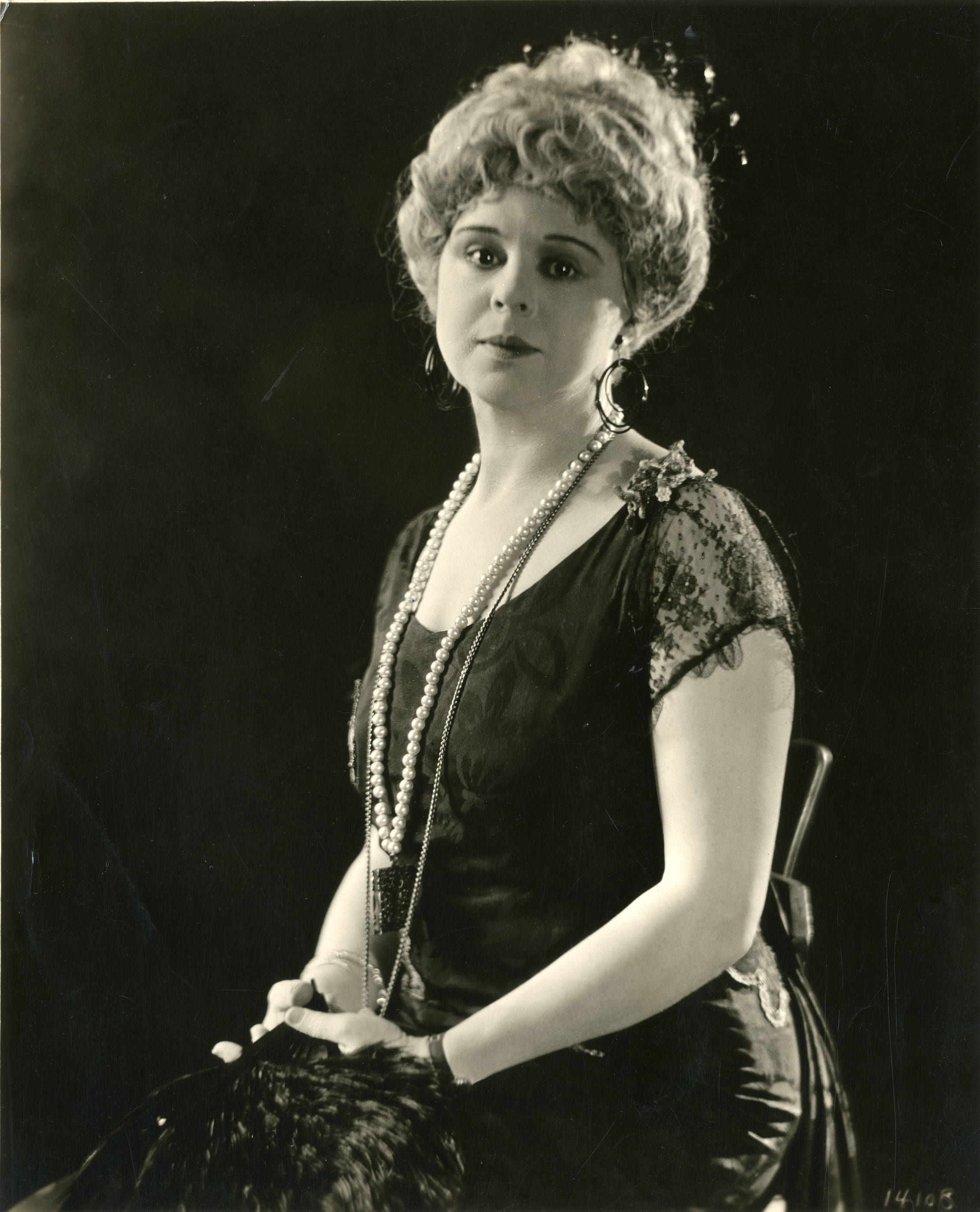
- Farley c. 1923
- Born: Dorothea Farley; February 6, 1881; Chicago, Illinois, U.S.
- Died: May 2, 1971 (aged 90); South Pasadena, California, U.S.
- Other names: Dorothy Farley
- Occupation: Actress
- Years active: 1910–1950

Dorothea "Dot" Farley (February 6, 1881 – May 2, 1971) was an American film actress who appeared in 280 motion pictures from 1910 to 1950. She was also known as Dorothy Farley.

== Biography ==
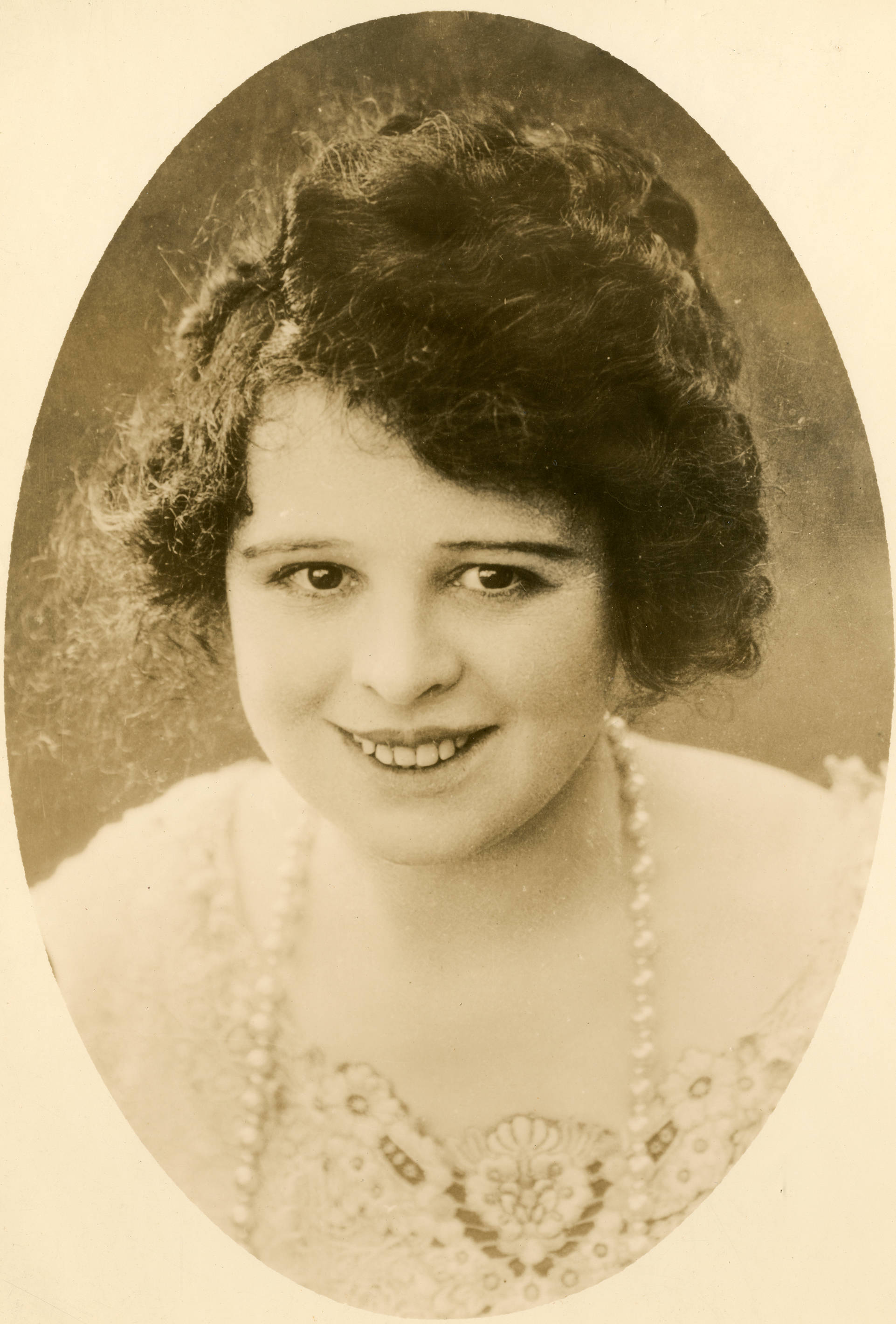
Farley in 1922

Born in Chicago, Dorothea Farley was the daughter of Eugene Farley and actress Alma Streeter. Her nickname originated when she sang and danced on stage billed as "Chicago's Little Dot" when she was three years old.

Farley gained acting experience by working for six years in stock theater and made her film debut in 1910. Mainly known for her roles in short comedies, prolific with Mack Sennett in the silent days, she also appeared in Western films in the early 1910s. She was later notable as the mother-in-law of Edgar Kennedy in most of his series of short films at the RKO studios.

Farley was also a writer, with 260 of her stories having been produced by 1924.

== Death ==
Farley died in South Pasadena, California on May 2, 1971, age 90.

== Partial Filmography ==
Year	Title	Role	Notes
1911	The Ranchman's Vengeance	Marie	
1911	The Harem Skirt		Lost film
1912	At the Basket Picnic	Dave's Mother	
1912	The Peril of the Plains	Eliza, the Mother	Lost film
1913	Murphy's I.O.U.	Wife	Short Film
1913	The Bangville Police	Della's Mother	Short Film
1913	Passions, He Had Three		Short Film
1913	A Dollar Did It	Mrs. Riley	Lost film
1913	Peeping Pete		Short Film unconfirmed
1913	The Hubby's Job		uncredited Lost film
1913	Fatty Joins the Force	Fatty's Sweetheart	Short Film uncredited
1913	Miss Fairweather Out West	Miss Fairweather	Short Film
1913	Some Nerve	The Wife	Short Film
1914	The Price of Crime	Dorothea Vale	also screenwriter Lost film
1914	The Toll of the War-Path	Bess	also screenwriter
1914	Even Unto Death	Dorothea Gordon	also screenwriter
1914	Soul Mates	The Bride	also screenwriter Short film
1914	False Pride Has a Fall	Ellen Farley	also screenwriter Short film Lost film
1914	The Lust of the Red Man	The Settler's Wife	also screenwriter Short film Lost film credited as Dorothea Farley
1915	Aunt Matilda Outwitted	Aunt Matilda	also screenwriter Lost film
1915	Buy, Buy Baby!		also screenwriter Lost film
1915	Her New Yob	Lebia	also screenwriter Lost film
1915	Louisa's Battle With Cupid	Louisa	also screenwriter Lost film
1915	Misplaced Twins		also screenwriter Lost film
1915	The Near Capture of Jessie James	Jessie James	also screenwriter Lost film
1915	She Couldn't Get Away With It	The Spinster	also screenwriter Lost film
1915	Wheeled Into Matrimony		also screenwriter Lost film
1915	A Woman's Way		also screenwriter Lost film
1916	Inherited Passions or Are Passions Inherited?	Masie Williams	also screenwriter Lost film
1918	The Paper Hanger’s Revenge or Poor Rich Cleaners	The Cook	Short film
1918	Rip Roaring Rivals	Nifty Nell	Short film
1920	An Arabian Nightmare	Hotel Drudge	Short film
1921	A Small Town Idol	Mrs. Smith	
1921	Home Talent	Boarder	Lost film
1922	Bright Eyes	The Ambitious Mother	Short film
1922	The Crossroads of New York	Landlady	Mostly lost, only a fragment survives
1923	When Knights Were Cold		Short film uncredited
1923	Tea: With a Kick!	Mrs. Juniper	Lost film
1923	The Acquittal	Maid	
1923	Boy of Mine	Mrs. Pettis	Lost film
1924	The Mask of Lopez	Townswoman	
1924	Picking Peaches	The Customer	Short film
1924	Listen Lester	Miss Pink	
1924	A Self-Made Failure		uncredited Lost film
1924	The Enemy Sex	Ida Summers	
1924	The Signal Tower	Cousin Gertie	
1924	The Fatal Mistake		Partly lost film
1924	Vanity's Price	Katherine, Vanna's maid	Lost film
1924	So Big	Widow Paarlenburg	Mostly lost, only a trailer survives
1925	Border Intrigue	Tough's Sister	Lost film
1925	My Son	Hattie Smith	Lost film
1925	The Three Way Trail		
1925	Dr. Pyckle and Mr. Pryde	Townswoman	Short film uncredited
1925	Rugged Water	Mrs. Fuller	Lost film
1925	The Unchastened Woman		
1925	The Red Kimona	The Inquisitive One	
1925	A Woman of the World	Mrs. Fox	
1925	The Lure of the Track		
1926	Memory Lane	Maid	
1926	The Grand Duchess and the Waiter	The Countess Prascovia Avaloff	
1926	The Little Irish Girl	Gertie	Lost film
1926	Brooding Eyes	Marie De Costa	
1926	The Still Alarm	Mrs. Maloney	
1926	Money Talks	Mrs. Chatterton	Lost film
1926	So This Is Paris	Madame Moreau	uncredited
1926	Honesty – The Best Policy	Author's Wife	added sequence Lost film
1926	The Family Upstairs	Mademoiselle Clarice	Lost film
1926	Young April	Maggie	
1926	The Timid Terror	Mrs. Milliken	
1926	Golf Widows		Short film
1926	Matrimony Blues		Short film
1927	Nobody's Widow	Roxanna's Maid	Lost film
1927	The Overland Stage	Aunt Viney	Lost film
1927	McFadden's Flats	Bridget Maloney	Lost film
1927	Girl in the Rain		Lost film
1927	The Shamrock and the Rose	Mrs. Kelly	
1927	All Aboard	Aunt Patsy	Lost film
1927	The King of Kings	Maidservant of Caiaphas	
1927	Yours to Command	Ma O'Brien	Lost film
1927	The Lost Limited		Lost film
1927	His First Flame	Mrs. Benedict	
1927	The Climbers	Juana, the Duchess' maid	Lost film
1927	The Tired Business Man	Mrs. McGinnis	Lost film
1927	Topsy and Eva		uncredited
1927	Breakfast at Sunrise	Telephone Operator	uncredited
1927	The Girl from Everywhere	Madame Zweibach	
1928	The Garden of Eden	Monte Carlo Switchboard Operator	uncredited
1928	Lady Be Good	Texas West	Lost film
1928	Black Feather		Lost film
1928	The Code of the Scarlet	Widow Malone	Lost film
1928	The Head Man	Mrs. Denny	Lost film
1928	Celebrity	Mother	
1928	Should a Girl Marry?	Mae Reynolds	Mostly lost, only a trailer survives
1929	Foolish Husbands	Mrs. Billy Blake	Short film
1929	Marquis Preferred	Mrs. Gruger	credited as Dorothy Farley
1929	Divorce Made Easy	Aunt Emma	
1929	Why Leave Home?	Susan	
1930	Harmony at Home	The Modiste	
1930	The Unholy Three	Woman Buying Parrot	uncredited
1930	Road to Paradise	Lola	
1930	The Little Accident	Mrs.Van Dine	
1930	The Third Alarm	Woman Barber	
1931	The Front Page	Madame	uncredited
1931	A Woman of Experience	Beer Garden Patron	uncredited
1931	Dancing Dynamite	Effie	
1931	The Law of the Tong	Madam Duval	
1932	While Paris Sleeps	Concierge	
1932	Trapped in Tia Juana	Aunt Emma	
1932	Lawyer Man	Client Paying $5,000 Fee	uncredited
1933	Curtain at Eight	Alice	
1934	Love Past Thirty	Dressmaker	
1934	Down to Their Last Yacht	Passenger with Diamond Bracelets	uncredited
1935	Diamond Jim	Barmaid	uncredited
1935	False Pretenses	Mrs. Smythe	
1936	Ring Around the Moon	Bella	
1936	Dummy Ache	Florence's Mother	Short film
1936	Wanted! Jane Turner	Landlady	uncredited
1936	Arizona Mahoney	Woman at Circus	uncredited
1937	Love Is News	Woman Wanting Steve's Autograph	uncredited
1937	We Have Our Moments		uncredited
1937	Too Many Wives	Mrs. Potts	
1937	Rustlers' Valley	Mrs. Anson	uncredited
1938	The Purple Vigilantes	Suffrogate	uncredited
1938	The Road to Reno	Mrs. Brumleigh	credited as Dorothy Farley
1938	The Stranger from Arizona	Martha	
1938	Slander House	Mrs. Willis	
1938	Lawless Valley	Anna Marsh	
1939	I Stole a Million		uncredited
1939	The Women	Large Woman	uncredited
1939	$1,000 a Touchdown	Hysterical Woman	uncredited
1941	We Go Fast	Hempstead's Cook	uncredited
1941	Look Who's Laughing	Mrs. Mary Blaize	uncredited
1942	Obliging Young Lady	Bird Lover	uncredited
1942	Tales of Manhattan	Party Guest (Fields sequence)	uncredited
1942	Cat People	Mrs. Agnew	uncredited
1943	Hers to Hold	Wife of Soldier	uncredited
1944	Hail the Conquering Hero	Mamie's Mother	uncredited
1944	San Fernando Valley	Hattie O'Toole	
1947	The Sin of Harold Diddlebock	Smoke's Secretary	uncredited
1947	They Won't Believe Me	Emma	uncredited
1948	Fighting Father Dunne	Mrs. Flaherty	uncredited
1949	The File on Thelma Jordon	Prisoner	uncredited
