= Queenie (film) =

1921 silent film

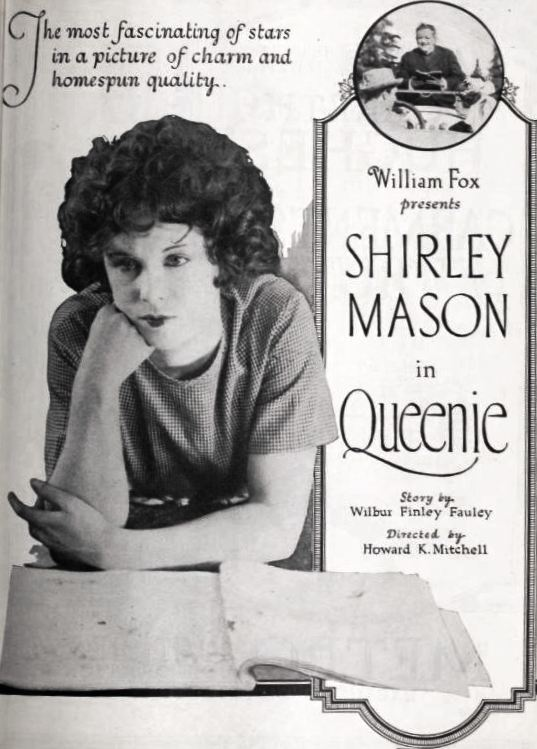
- Directed by: Howard M. Mitchell
- Written by: Dorothy Yost
- Produced by: William Fox
- Starring: Shirley Mason; George O'Hara; Adolphe Menjou
- Cinematography: George Schneiderman
- Production company: Fox Film
- Distributed by: Fox Film
- Release date: October 9, 1921
- Running time: 50 minutes
- Country: United States
- Languages: Silent; English intertitles

Queenie is a 1921 American silent drama film directed by Howard M. Mitchell and starring Shirley Mason, George O'Hara and Adolphe Menjou.

== Cast ==
- Shirley Mason as Queenie Gurkin
- George O'Hara as Vivan Van Winkle
- Clarence Wilson as Simon Pepper / Abner Quigley
- Aggie Herring as Pansy Pooley
- Lydia Yeamans Titus as Mrs. Mulliken
- Adolphe Menjou as Count Michael
- Clarissa Selwynne as Mrs. Torrence

== Censorship ==
Before the film could be exhibited in Kansas, the Kansas Board of Review required the elimination of all scenes where a woman smokes.

== Bibliography ==
- Munden, Kenneth White. The American Film Institute Catalog of Motion Pictures Produced in the United States, Part 1. University of California Press, 1997.
