= The Crossroads of New York =

1922 film

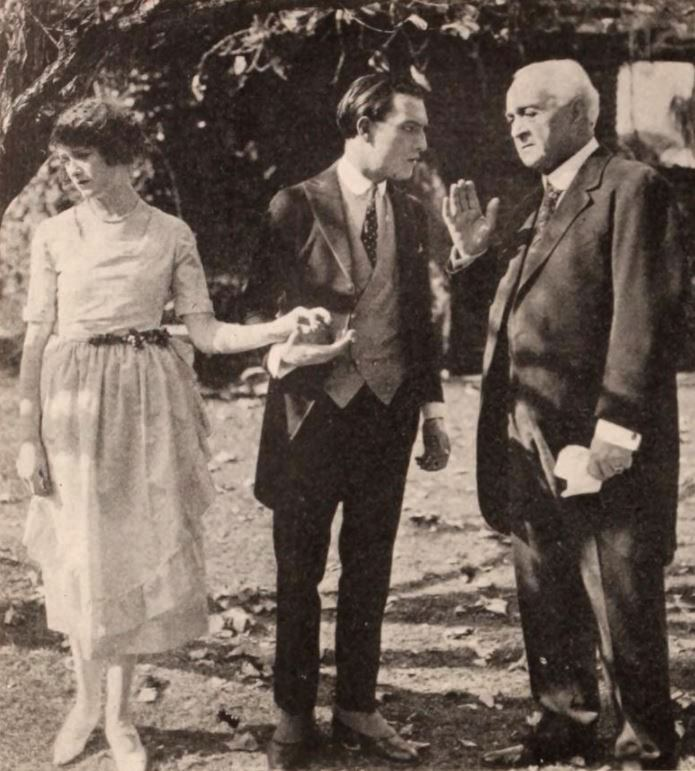
- Kathryn McGuire, George O'Hara and Herbert Standing
- Directed by: F. Richard Jones
- Produced by: Mack Sennett
- Starring: George O'Hara
- Cinematography: Homer Scott; Fred Jackman; Robert Walters
- Edited by: Allen McNeil
- Distributed by: First National Pictures
- Release date: June 22, 1922
- Running time: 60 minutes
- Country: United States
- Language: Silent (English intertitles)

The Crossroads of New York is a lost 1922 American silent comedy film directed by F. Richard Jones and an all-star cast of silent comedians. It was produced by Mack Sennett and released through First National Distributors.

== Plot ==
As described in a film magazine, vamp Grace St. Clair is willing to accept large checks from millionaire James Flint but does not care for his caresses. James' nephew Michael from the country arrives, fondly expecting to live in luxury at his uncle's home in the city, but he is quickly disillusioned. His uncle gratifies his wish to wear a uniform, but it is of the White Wings street cleaners.

Michael goes to live in a cheap boardinghouse where the landlady makes violent love to him, and he discovers that he is somehow engaged to her. Her lover Star Boarder, who acts the yokel, cannot move her heart, even when he sings "You Made Me What I am Today." Michael is called upon to save the lovely heiress Ruth Anthony on two occasions, and Star the humble suitor convinces the boardinghouse lady that the young man is not true and gets her heart on the rebound. Lady Luck apparently discovers Michael, and his uncle James goes to Alaska, falls down a cliff, and is reported as being dead, leaving Michael the house and his millions.

Michael now feels that he can tell Ruth of his love, for she has dismissed her fiancé Garrett Chesterfield. Because the uncle can no longer supply the needed funds for her needs, Grace makes a play for Michael. Michael finds himself the subject of a breach of promise lawsuit with Grace telling the most amazing story of his violent courtship of her.

Then Ruth's father John D. Anthony is held prisoner by her rejected suitor Garrett, and Michael comes to the rescue. In the end, the villains of the story get their just deserts in a most approved fashion, and the young pair Michael and Ruth are reunited.

== Cast ==
- George O'Hara as Michael Flint
- Noah Beery as James Flint
- Ethel Grey Terry as Grace St. Clair
- Ben Deeley as Press Agent
- Billy Bevan as Press Agent
- Herbert Standing as John D. Anthony
- Dot Farley as Landlady
- Eddie Gribbon as Star Boarder
- Kathryn McGuire as Ruth Anthony
- Robert Cain as Garrett Chesterfield
- Mildred June as Waitress
- Raymond Griffith as Wall Street Wolf
- Charles Murray as Judge
- James Finlayson as Lawyer
- Patrick Kelly as Butler

== Premieres ==
- The east coast premiere was held at the Capitol Theatre, New York on May 21, 1922.
- The west coast premiere was held at Miller's Theatre, Los Angeles on June 16, 1922.

== Preservation status ==
The Crossroads of New York is a lost film save for a fragment, 705 feet long, at the Deutsche Kinemathek.
