= Randy Rides Alone =

1934 film

- Film poster for a later re-release
- Directed by: Harry L. Fraser
- Written by: Lindsley Parsons
- Produced by: Paul Malvern for Lone Star Productions
- Starring: John Wayne; Alberta Vaughn; George Hayes
- Cinematography: Archie Stout
- Edited by: Carl Pierson
- Production company: Lone Star Productions
- Distributed by: Monogram Pictures
- Release date: June 5, 1934
- Running time: 53 minutes
- Country: United States
- Language: English

Randy Rides Alone is a 1934 American Pre-Code Western film starring John Wayne, Yakima Canutt, and George Hayes (before Hayes developed his famous "Gabby" persona). The 53-minute black-and-white film was directed by Harry L. Fraser, produced by Paul Malvern for Lone Star Productions, and released by Monogram Pictures. Wayne plays a cowboy falsely accused of massacring all the occupants of a saloon, except for a beautiful young woman who hid out of sight.

== Plot ==
Randy Bowers arrives at Ed Rogers' Half-Way House saloon and happily enters to the sounds of "Sobre las Olas" on the player piano. He is shocked to discover the patrons and bartender dead. A pair of eyes watch him from behind a portrait over the bar. He finds a note that warns the sheriff not to investigate. When the sheriff arrives, he arrests Randy for the massacre.

Rogers' niece Sally emerges from behind the portrait. She tries to remove her uncle's safe from the floor, but it is too heavy.

The sheriff is advised by Matt the Mute, whose handwriting matches the note in the saloon. Matt rides off to a criminal hideout beneath a waterfall where he takes off his disguise and reveals his true identity as Marvin Black. He assembles his men and asks how about their saloon raid. They explain that they could not find Rogers' stash of $30,000. Black had intended to use that money to buy the saloon and increase his monopoly on the land in the area. Convinced Sally knows where it is, he returns to town as Matt to connive her out of it.

Sally goes to the sheriff and meets Randy in a holding cell. He shows her a note that explains he was sent to the saloon as an agent of the Adams Express Company. Sally helps Randy escape. He takes refuge from the Sheriff's pursuing men in Marvin's hideout. When Marvin's gang kidnap Sally, Randy tells her he will go get help. She gives him the key to the safe and tells him where it is.

Randy takes the money out of the safe and replaces it with dynamite. He leads the sheriff back to Marvin's hideout. He rushes in and tells Marvin where the safe is before the sheriff arrives. During the ensuing chaos, Marvin rushes to the saloon. He tries to open the safe by shooting it and blows up the entire saloon. Randy reveals to the sheriff that Matt the Mute was Marvin Black, and he gives Sally back her money.

== Cast ==
- John Wayne as Randy Bowers
- Alberta Vaughn as Sally Rogers
- George Hayes as Marvin Black, or Matt Mathews or Matt the Mute
- Yakima Canutt as henchman Spike
- Earl Dwire as Sheriff
- Artie Ortego as Deputy Al
- Tommy Coats

== Production ==
The Lone Star pictures began at Warner Bros. as a way of repurposing stock footage from Ken Maynard's films with Wayne acting in the closeups. Trem Carr suggested continuing the brand with original films. Wayne agreed to do eight pictures a year at a rate of $2,500. Randy Rides Alone was the sixth of nine Lone Star pictures starring John Wayne that Monogram would release in 1934. The films were made cheaply on budgets between $10–20,0000, but they were pivotal in establishing Wayne's film persona. Wayne has a "lazy air of increasing confidence" in the movie.

Lindsley Parsons was the publicity director at Monogram Pictures. Randy Rides Alone was the third screenplay that Lone Star Productions bought from him. The script was later described as "the epitome of a Lindsley Parsons story", partially because of the unusual opening scene.

Harry Fraser wrote in his memoir that the films he did with John Wayne "did not break any box office records. But they were fair entertainment, and Wayne, as he told me many years later, never worked harder in his life than he did on those little shoot-'em-ups." Fraser excelled at making films cheaply.

The film was shot from late April to early May near Placerita Canyon and in Santa Clarita, California. Yakima Canutt did some of John Wayne's stunts. One required Canutt to jump off a bridge from atop his horse. Canutt's viability as Wayne's stunt double increased as Wayne improved his horsemanship. They worked closely together to create a better screen product and became close friends.

== Reception ==
Motion Picture Herald praised the stunts and wrote, "The exhibitor has little opportunity to sell the film in any but the usual manner for western material, but that, with the Wayne name, and played at the proper time, should be sufficient." Kinematograph Weekly praised Wayne as "not only a master in the art of riding but also a swimmer of note. They enjoyed the Jekyll and Hyde nature of the film and felt Hayes made a "tireless villain". The Daily Film Renter summed it up as a "fair offering of its type" with a story that "adheres closely to formula" and high praise in particular for the stunts. In Zanesville, Ohio, Randy Rides Alone was paired with Chapter 9 of The Vanishing Shadow. The local paper raved about its fusion of the Western and mystery genres, calling it "a thrilling tale of the frontier days..."

Retrospectively, the film's opening is cited as the "bloodthirstiest but most intriguing of any low-budget Western." Randy Rides Alone is seen as one of the better examples of Wayne's Lone Star Westerns. It has also been dismissed as "cowboy claptrap" which John Wayne spends "searching desperately for a plot".

== See also ==
- John Wayne filmography
