= False Evidence (1919 film) =

1919 silent film directed by Edwin Carewe

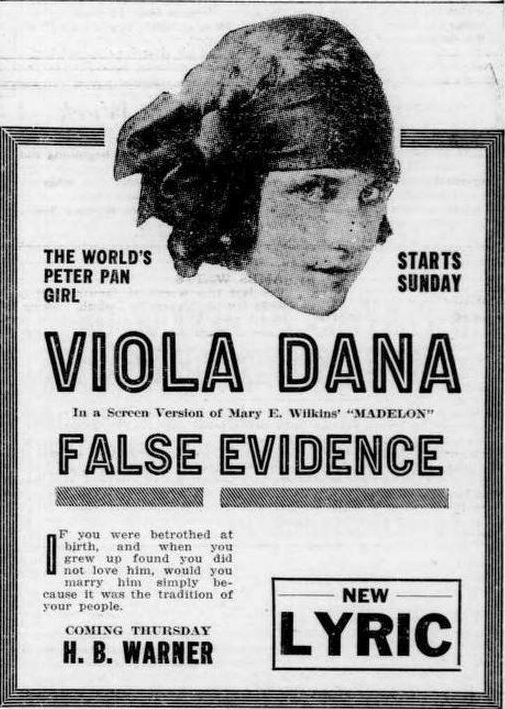
- Newspaper advertisement for False Evidence (1919 film)
- Directed by: Edwin Carewe
- Written by: Finis Fox
- Based on: the novel, Madelon by Mary E. Wilkins Freeman
- Starring: Viola Dana; Wheeler Oakman; Joseph King
- Cinematography: John Arnold
- Production company: Metro Pictures
- Release date: April 21, 1919 (US)
- Running time: 5 reels
- Country: United States
- Language: Silent (English intertitles)

False Evidence, originally titled Madelon of the Redwoods, is a 1919 American silent drama film that was directed by Edwin Carewe. It stars Viola Dana, Wheeler Oakman, and Joseph King, and was released on April 21, 1919.

== Cast ==
- Viola Dana as Madelon MacTavish
- Wheeler Oakman as Burr Gordon
- Joseph King as Lot Gordon
- Edward J. Connelly as Sandy MacTavish
- J. Patrick O'Malley as Richard MacTavish
- Peggy Pearce as Dorothy Fair
- Virginia Ross as Samanthy Brown

== Production ==
The movie was originally titled Madelon of the Redwoods, but was renamed False Evidence in April 1919. The film was the first adaptation of any sort of one of Mary E. Wilkins Freeman novels. On March 17, 1919, the Santa Cruz Evening News reported that Viola Dana and Wheeler Oakman, for Metro Pictures, had finished filming on location at Hopkins' Big Trees in Felton and were headed south to film the interior segments of Madelon of the Redwoods. According to Derek Whaley, Metro repurposed defunct buildings in a part of the park called Welch Grove to serve as a "pioneer town" for the film.

== Reception ==
Exhibitors Herald, while they found the storyline dark and grim, praised the performances of Oakman and King, and while they felt it was far from Dana's best performance, they felt she did it "faithfully and effectively". They felt the picture was done very realistically. The Tampa Sunday Tribune gave the film a good review, calling it "a gripping romance of the redwoods, giving Viola Dana a role that reflects all her vivid personality and dramatic powers." The Nashville Banner also gave the film a good review, highlighting the performances of both Dana, and her supporting cast. The Sacramento Star enjoyed the film as well, "a radiant story because Viola Dana takes the stellar role, which is one of laughter and pathos."

== Preservation ==
A complete print of False Evidence is held by the Cinematheque Royale de Belgique.
