= The Battle of Gettysburg (1913 film) =

1913 film by Charles Giblyn and Thomas H. Ince

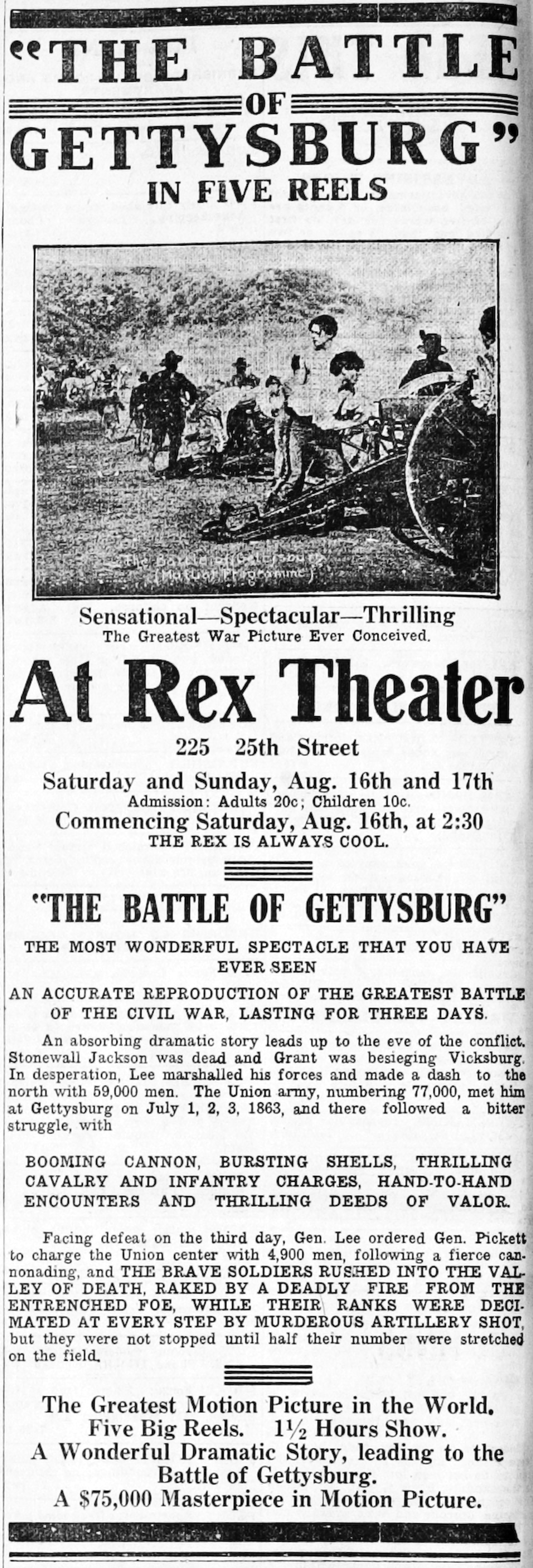
- Newspaper promotion of film, 1913
- Directed by: Charles Giblyn; Thomas H. Ince
- Written by: Charles Brown; Thomas H. Ince; Richard V. Spencer; C. Gardner Sullivan (titles)
- Produced by: Thomas H. Ince
- Starring: Willard Mack; Charles K. French
- Distributed by: Mutual Film; Hiller & Wick Inc. (re-release)
- Release date: June 1, 1913
- Running time: 50 minutes
- Country: United States
- Languages: Silent; English intertitles

The Battle of Gettysburg is a 1913 American silent war film directed by Charles Giblyn and Thomas H. Ince. The Battle of Gettysburg is based on the American Civil War battle of the same name. The film is now considered to be lost, although some battlefield footage was used by Mack Sennett in his comedy Cohen Saves the Flag, which was shot on location alongside this production. There are claims that The Battle of Gettysburg was screened in France in 1973.

== Cast ==
- Willard Mack as An Undetermined Leading Role
- Charles Edler as Abraham Lincoln
- Ann Little as Virginia Burke, The Confederate Sister (credited as Anna Little)
- Joe King as Jack Lamar, The Confederate Brother
- Burton L. King as Jim Burke, The Sister's Sweetheart
- Herschel Mayall
- Walter Edwards
- J. Barney Sherry
- George Fisher
- J. Frank Burke
- Enid Markey
- Gertrude Claire as A Secondary Role (unconfirmed)
- Shorty Hamilton as A Secondary Role (unconfirmed)

== See also ==
- List of films and television shows about the American Civil War
- List of lost films
