= Rosa Gore =

American actress (1866–1941)

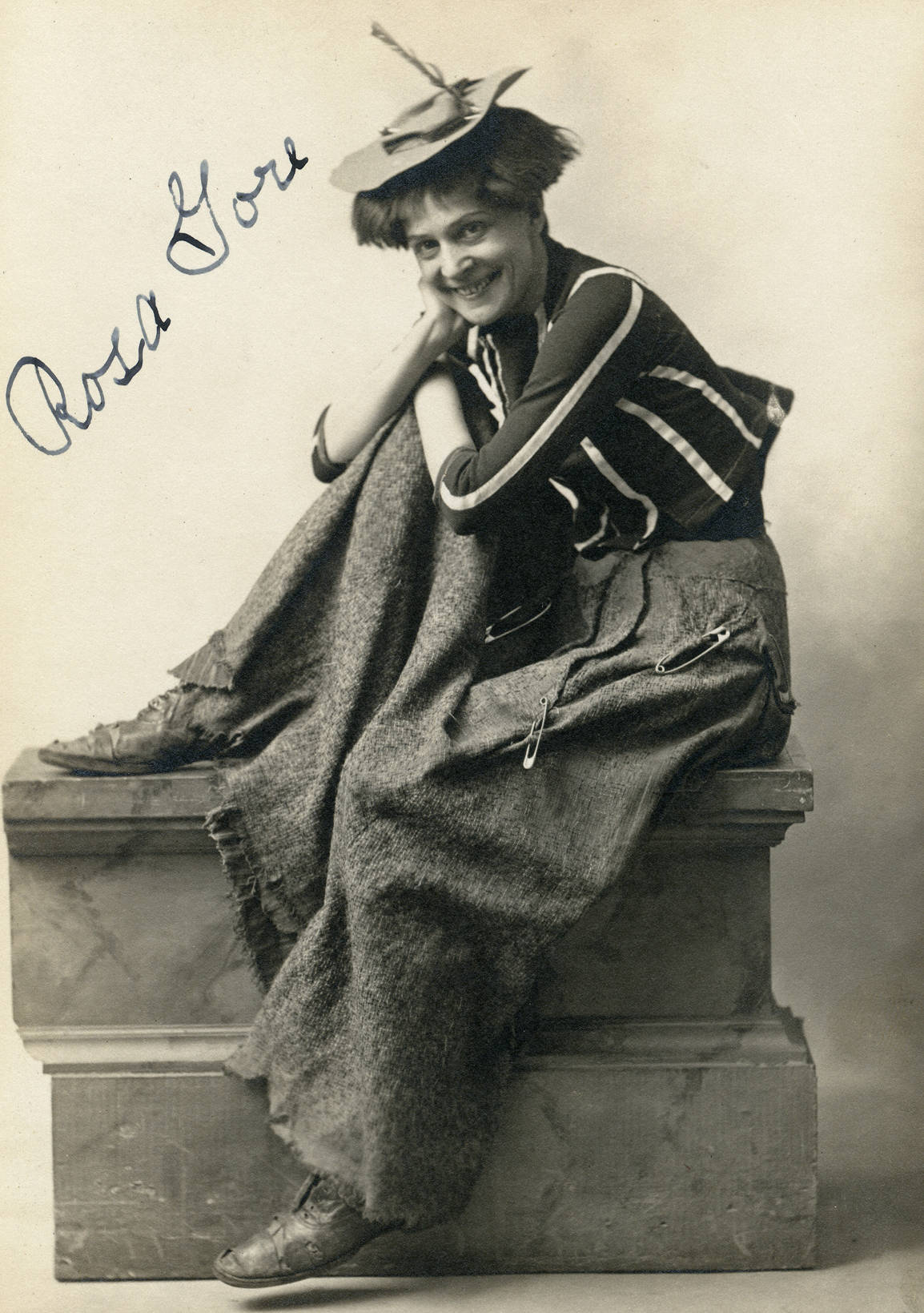
- Circa 1908
- Born: Minnie Lyons; September 15, 1866; New York City, New York, USA
- Died: February 4, 1941 (aged 74); Los Angeles, California, USA
- Occupation(s): Film and stage actress
- Spouse: Dan Crimmins

Rosa Gore (born Minnie Lyons; September 15, 1866 – February 4, 1941) was an American film actress active in Hollywood primarily during the silent era. She appeared in at least 70 films over the course of her career. She got her start in vaudeville and was known for her work with her husband, actor Dan Crimmins.

Gore was born in New York City and died in Los Angeles, California.

== Partial filmography ==
- La La Lucille (1920)
- The Mistress of Shenstone (1921)
- The Town Scandal (1923)
- Captain January (1924)
- Madonna of the Streets (1924)
- Seven Chances (1925)
- Three Weeks in Paris (1925)
- Lovey Mary (1926)
- The Adorable Deceiver (1926)
- Play Safe (1927)
- The Royal American (1927)
- The Prairie King (1927)
- A Trick of Hearts (1928)
- Anybody Here Seen Kelly? (1928)
- The Hard Hombre (1931)
- Vagabond Lady (1935)
