= Peeping Pete =

1913 film

- Directed by: Mack Sennett
- Produced by: Mack Sennett
- Starring: Fatty Arbuckle
- Release date: June 23, 1913
- Running time: 7 minutes
- Country: United States
- Languages: Silent; English intertitles

Peeping Pete is a 1913 American short comedy film featuring Fatty Arbuckle.

== Cast ==
- Phyllis Allen
- Roscoe "Fatty" Arbuckle as Pete's wife
- Charles Avery
- Peggy Pearce
- Nick Cogley as Sheriff
- Dot Farley
- Mack Sennett as Pete
- Ford Sterling as Neighbor

== See also ==
- List of American films of 1913
- Fatty Arbuckle filmography
