= George O'Hara (actor) =

American actor and screenwriter

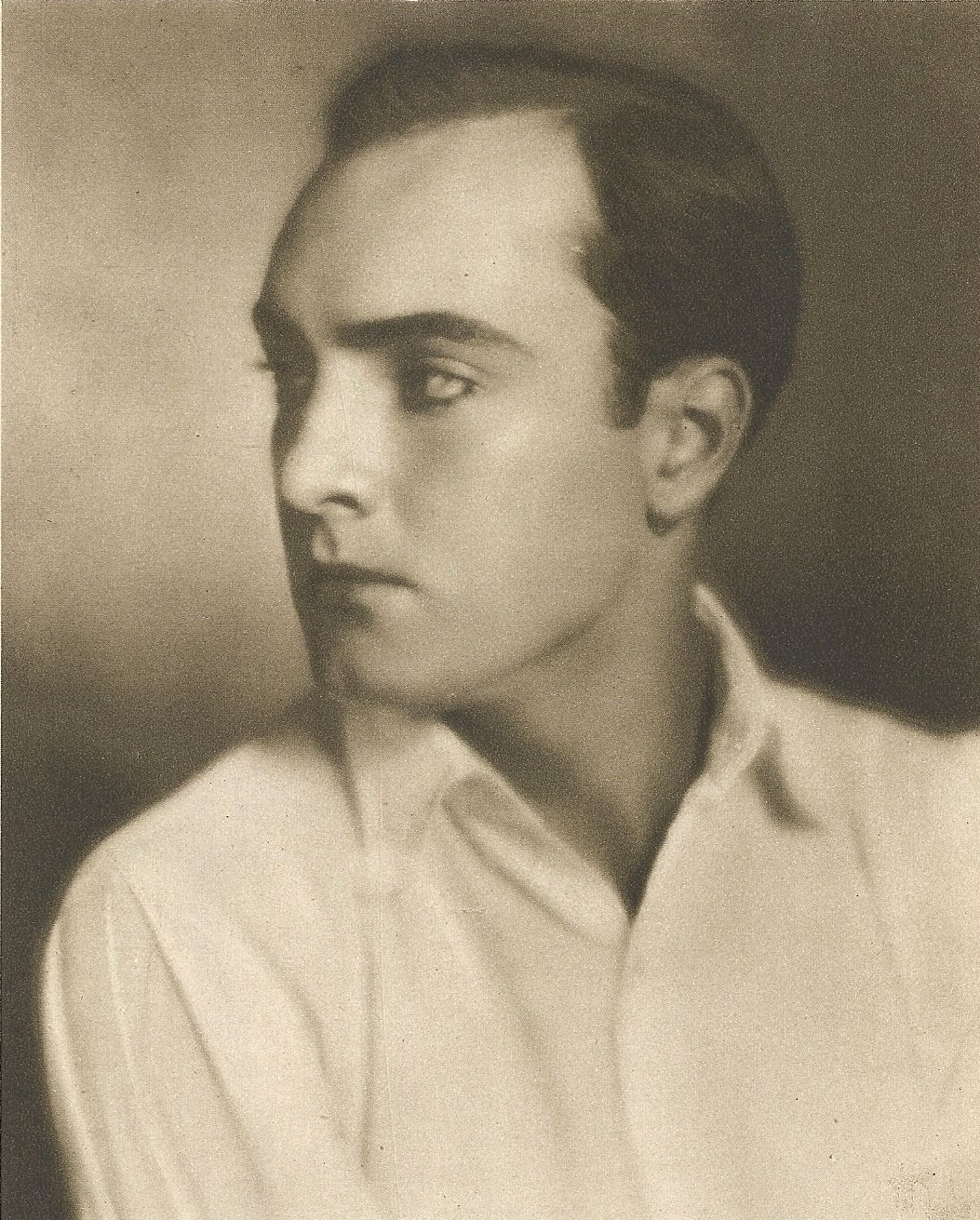
- George O'Hara c. 1920
- Born: George Bolger; February 22, 1899; New York City, New York, U.S.
- Died: October 16, 1966 (aged 67); Los Angeles, California, U.S.
- Occupations: Actor, screenwriter
- Years active: 1919–1946

George O'Hara (born George Bolger, February 22, 1899 – October 16, 1966) was an American motion picture actor and screenwriter of the silent film era.

== Biography ==
Born in New York City and raised in Hollywood, California, George O'Hara began his acting career under contract as a performer for early Hollywood director Mack Sennett. Sennett was immediately charmed by the handsome, cleft-chinned young actor and saw O'Hara as a potentially popular matinee idol. O'Hara's acting career received an early boost when Sennett cast the young actor in the commercially successful 1920 romantic film Love, Honor, and Behave opposite the popular silent film actress Marie Prevost.

In 1921, O'Hara began working behind the camera with Sennett's tutelage. He was credited as an associate producer in the Ben Turpin film A Small Town Idol and later worked as a continuity and title writer throughout the 1920s in the film industry as well as continuing his successful acting career.

O'Hara was most popular with the public when starring in two-reel action and adventure serials of the 1920s, such as The Pacemakers and Casey of the Coast Guard. In his most popular serial, Fighting Blood, O'Hara was cast as a boxer; a role well-suited to O'Hara, who in his free time was a boxing aficionado and moderately successful in the amateur lightweight division of the sport.

Throughout the 1920s, O'Hara continued working as an actor and became a quite popular matinee idol. He costarred with John Barrymore and Dolores Costello in a silent film adaptation of Moby-Dick called The Sea Beast playing Barrymore's evil half-brother; O'Hara was aptly cast as he bore a resemblance to the legendary actor. With the advent of sound films however, the film studios began to heavily promote a new crop of actors and many of the formerly popular actors of the silent era (including O'Hara) found it increasingly difficult to find work. O'Hara quietly faded into an early retirement in the early 1930s but began trying to rebuild his career later in the decade by taking bit parts, most notably as the role of a clerk in the 1940 John Ford directed film adaptation of John Steinbeck's The Grapes of Wrath.

O'Hara never again achieved the success he had attained in his early career and spent the next several decades playing as an extra in often uncredited roles. O'Hara died of cancer in Los Angeles, California, in 1966.

== Partial filmography ==
- Love, Honor and Behave (1920) - Newlywed Groom
- A Small Town Idol (1921) - Cameraman
- Queenie (1921) - Vivian Van Winkle
- The Crossroads of New York (1922) - Michael Flint
- Shirley of the Circus (1922) - Pierre
- Fighting Blood (1923) - Gale Galen a.k.a. Six Second Smith
- A Midsummer Night's Scream (1923)
- Listen Lester (1924) - Jack Griffin
- Darwin Was Right (1924) - Robert Lee
- The Sea Beast (1926) - Derek Ceeley
- Casey of the Coast Guard (1926) - Ensign John Casey
- Why Girls Go Back Home (1926) - John Ross
- Bigger Than Barnum's (1926) - Robert Blandim
- Going the Limit (1926) - Gordon Emery
- The False Alarm (1926) - Tim Casey
- The Timid Terror (1926) - Talbot Trent
- Is That Nice? (1926) - Ralph Tanner
- California or Bust (1927) - Jeff Daggett
- Burnt Fingers (1927) - Dick
- Yours to Command (1927) - Robert Duane
- Ladies Beware (1927) - Jack O'Diamonds
- Pirates of the Pines (1928) - John Markham
- A Single Man (1929, writer)
- Side Street (1929, writer)
- Jesse James (1939) - Teller (uncredited)
- News Is Made at Night (1939) - Usher (uncredited)
- The Honeymoon's Over (1939) - Elevator Operator (uncredited)
- The Grapes of Wrath (1940) - Clerk (uncredited)
- The Cowboy and the Blonde (1941) - Melvyn
- Cadet Girl (1941) - Waiter (uncredited)
- Remember the Day (1941) - Photographer (uncredited)
- The Dolly Sisters (1945) - Frank Tinny (uncredited)
- When My Baby Smiles at Me (1948) - Stagehand (uncredited) (final film role)
