= Listen Lester (film) =

1924 film by William A. Seiter

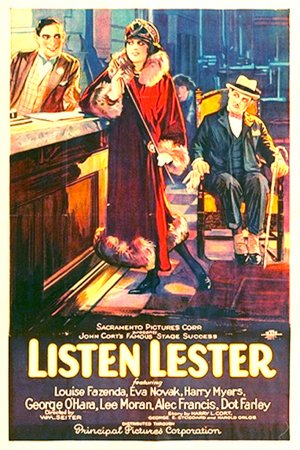
- Theatrical poster
- Directed by: William A. Seiter
- Written by: William A. Seiter; Lewis Milestone
- Based on: Listen Lester (play) by Harry Linsley Cort and George E. Stoddard
- Produced by: Carl Laemmle
- Starring: Louise Fazenda; Harry Myers; Eva Novak; George O'Hara
- Cinematography: John Stumar
- Edited by: Owen Marks
- Production company: Sacramento Pictures
- Distributed by: Principal Distributing Corporation
- Release date: May 20, 1924 (USA theatrical)
- Running time: 60 minutes 6 reels, 6242 feet
- Country: United States
- Language: English intertitles

Listen Lester is a 1924 American black-and-white silent drama/comedy film directed by William A. Seiter, with a screen adaptation by Lewis Milestone and William A. Seiter, based upon the 1918 stage play of the same name. Released by Universal Pictures on May 20, 1924, the film stars Louise Fazenda and Harry Myers.

Prints of the film exist in the Library of Congress film archive.

== Plot ==
Widower Colonel Dodge enjoys being single, but when Arbutus Quilty, his former sweetheart, threatens to sue him for breach of promise, he decides its time for him and his daughter Mary to take themselves a little vacation trip to Florida. Angry, Arbutus enlists the aid of lady detective Miss Pink and follows the two to Florida. At his hotel, the Colonel enlists the aid of the hotel detective Listen Lester to get back the incriminating love letters he had written to Arbutus. The detective accomplishes his task but is himself foiled when Miss Pink recovers the letters. A hotel clerk then gets them back, but in turn loses them back to Arbutus. Mary in the meantime is sparking up a romance with Jack Griffin, but Jack believes that the Colonel is her beau instead of her father and declines involvement. In desperation, Arbustus enlists the aid of Lester to fake she and Mary getting kidnapped in the hope that this will bring the men to their senses. One of the fake kidnappers takes himself too seriously and gets a bit rough with Mary. Jack rescues the women and he and Mary reconcile. Out of ideas, Arbustus decides to stop chasing the Colonel. When the Colonel realizes how much he would miss her attentions, he discovers that he does love her after all. Both couples get married.

== Cast ==
- Louise Fazenda as Arbutus Quilty
- Harry Myers as Listen Lester
- Eva Novak as Mary Dodge
- George O'Hara as Jack Griffin
- Lee Moran as William Penn
- Alec B. Francis as Colonel Dodge
- Dot Farley as Miss Pink
