= Josef Swickard =

German actor (1866–1940)

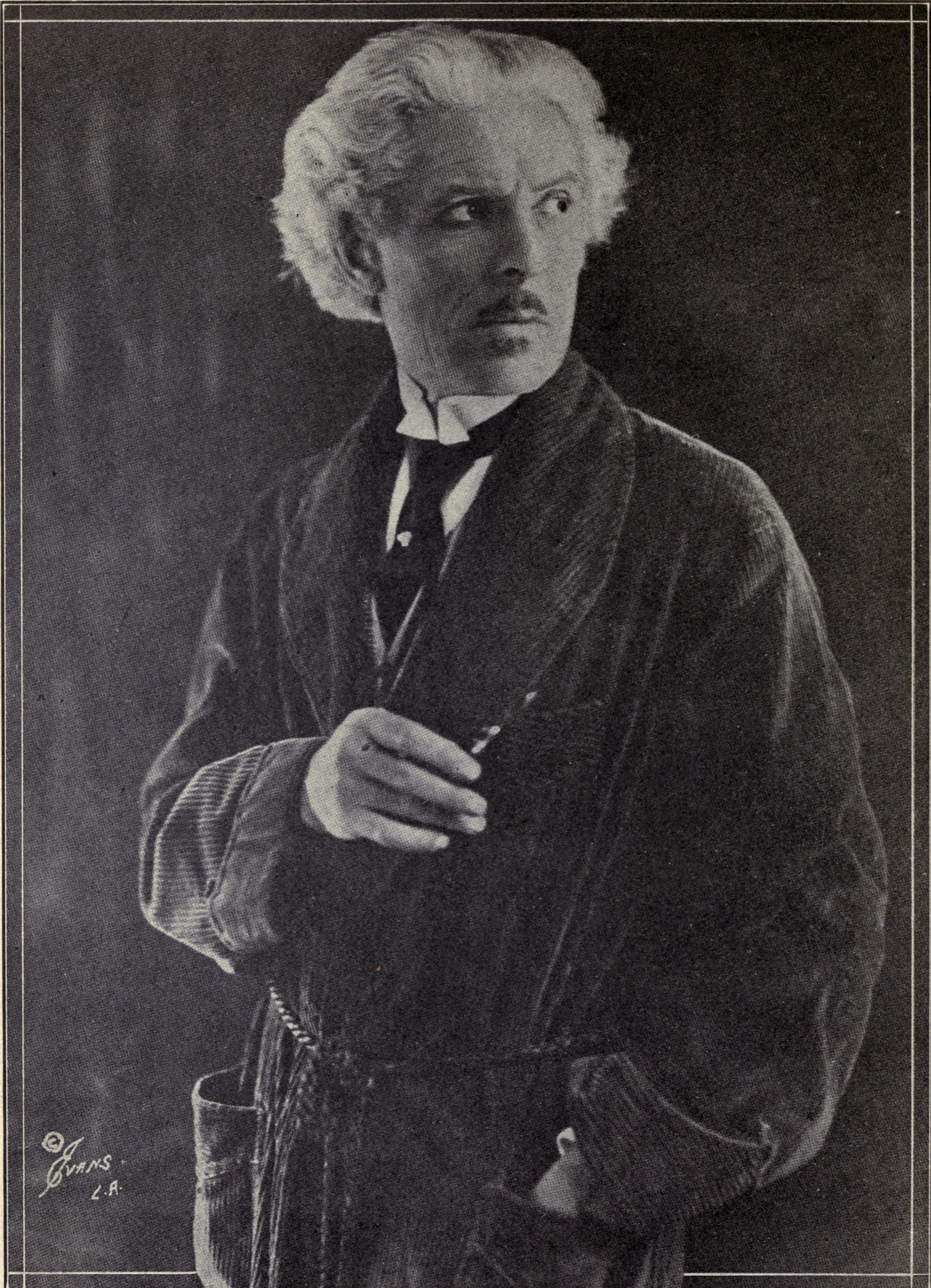
- Swickard in 1921
- Born: Peter Josef Schwickerath; June 26, 1866; Alf, Kingdom of Prussia
- Died: March 1, 1940 (aged 73); Hollywood, Los Angeles, California, United States
- Spouse: Margaret Campbell (m. 1928)

Josef Swickard (June 26, 1866 – March 1, 1940) was a Prussian-born American stage and screen character actor, who had toured with stock companies in Europe, South Africa, and South America.

== Career ==
Swickard emigrated to the United States from the German Empire in 1882. He was a stage actor for several years before entering films with D.W. Griffith in 1912 and by 1914 was playing supporting roles for Mack Sennett. He appeared in Charles Chaplin's Laughing Gas and Caught in a Cabaret. He remained with Sennett until 1917, when he settled into his prolific career of playing mostly aristocratic characters.

Modern audiences are perhaps most familiar with his role of Marcelo Desnoyers, the well-intentioned but impractical French upper class father in Rex Ingram's 1921 film The Four Horsemen of the Apocalypse. His career in sound films was somewhat limited and he played in low-budget and action serial type films. He played the villainous Prime Minister Kruel in the 1925 film version of The Wizard of Oz.

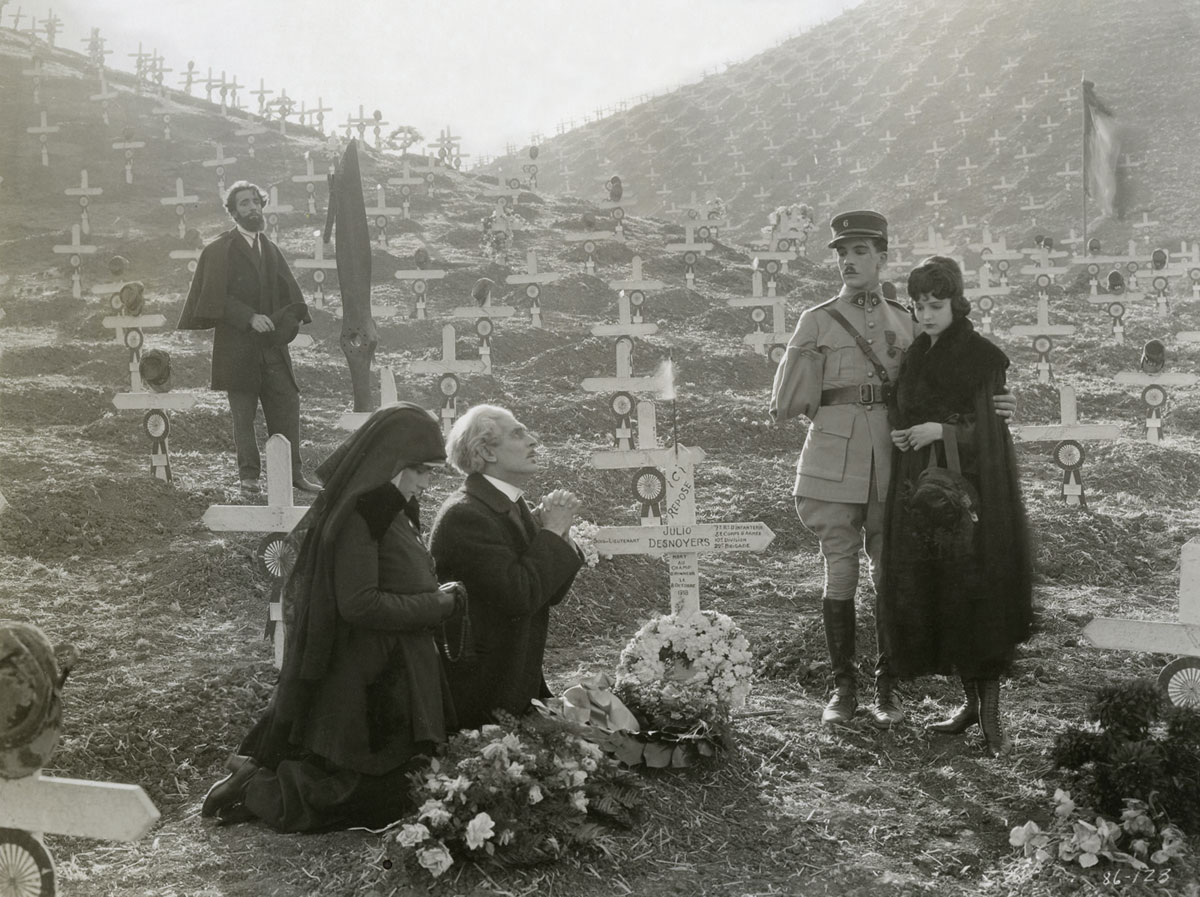
Swickard as Marcelo Desnoyers in The Four Horsemen of the Apocalypse (1921)

== Family life and death ==
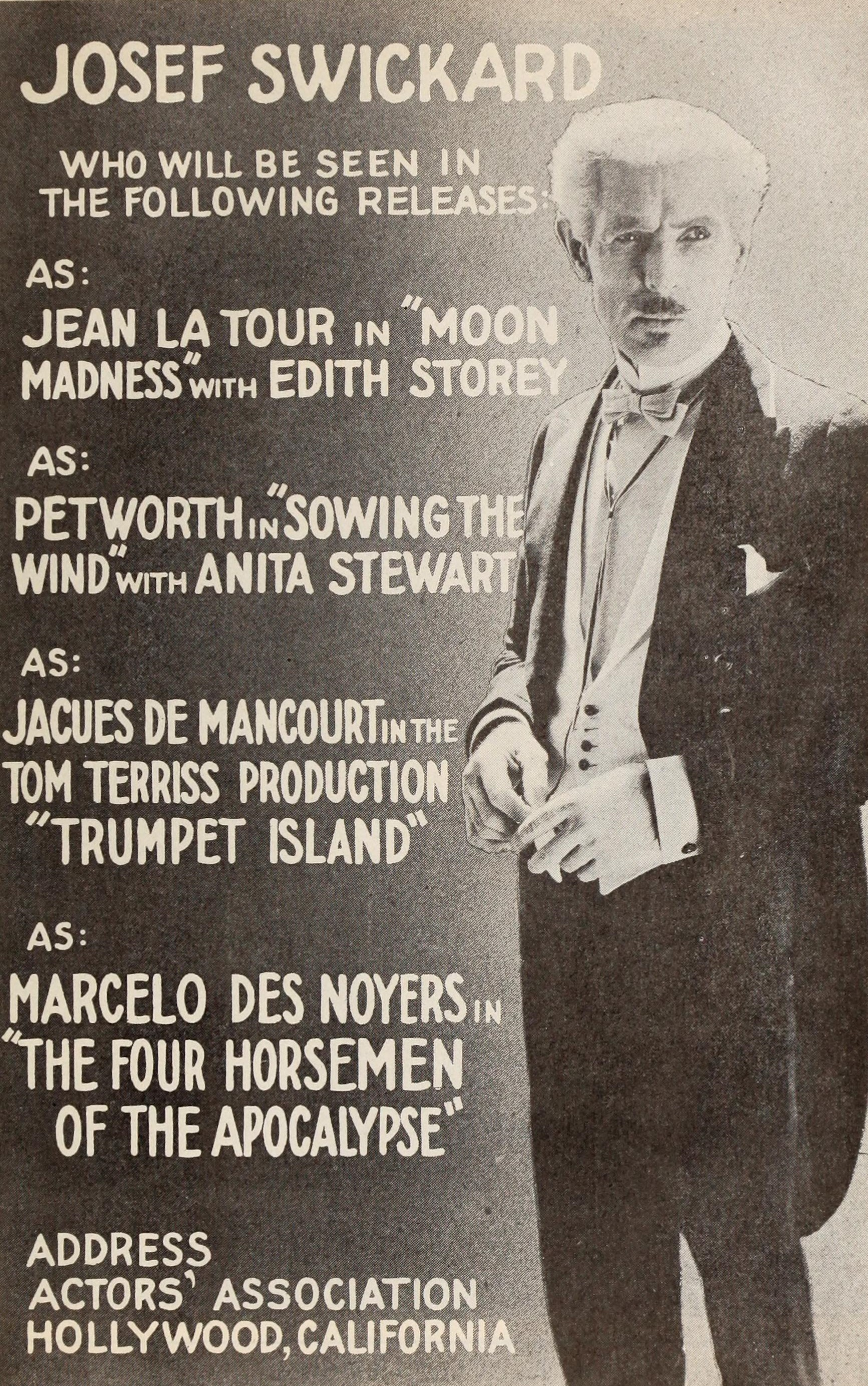

Born in the Kingdom of Prussia in 1866 to Peter Schwecherath and Geniveve Steffens, Swickard was the brother of actor Charles Swickard. After arriving in the United States in November 1882, Schwecherath changed his name to Swickard and married a Scottish woman named Queeny in 1896. In 1902, Swickard applied for citizenship in the Eastern District of New York under the name Joseph P. Schwickerath. Records also show Swickard submitted a petition for naturalization in Los Angeles, California in February 1936 under the name of Peter Joseph Schwickerath. Sometime around 1928 Swickard married Broadway actress Margaret Campbell. The union was short-lived and the couple divorced on January 15, 1929. Swickard's last known residence was the Plaza Hotel in Los Angeles where he lived after his divorce from Campbell.

Tragedy befell his ex-wife on June 27, 1939 when she was brutally murdered. Her son, Campbell McDonald, was the initial suspect. He was also suspected of having bludgeoned to death a Russian dancer, Anya Sosoyeva, as well as having assaulted the young actress Delia Bogard, who survived. Los Angeles police eventually arrested DeWitt Clinton Cook, who confessed to the murders of Campbell and Sosoyeva, as well as the attack on Bogard and several other women, and was sent to San Quentin, where he died in the gas chamber in 1941.

Nearly seven months to-the-day after his ex-wife's murder, Swickard died on February 29, 1940. He was 73.

Despite rumors that Swickard committed suicide by jumping from the Hollywood sign, his death was from natural causes. Swickard was buried under a simple headstone at Hollywood Forever Cemetery.

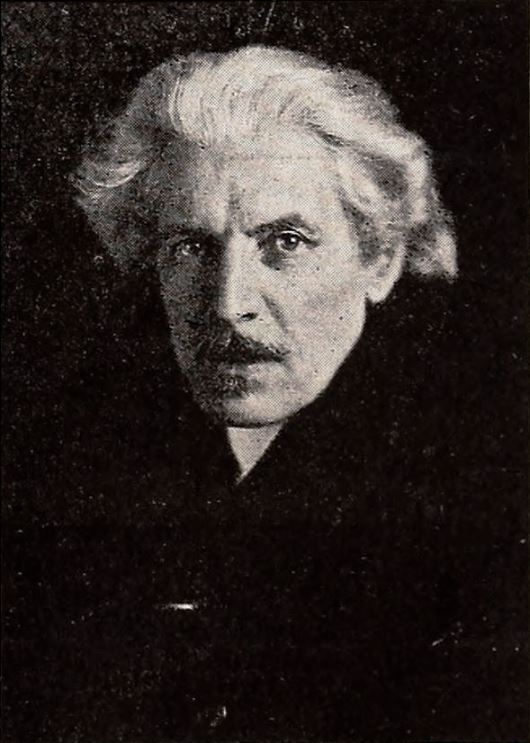

== Filmography ==
Year	Title	Role	Notes
1913	Cupid in a Dental Parlor	Ethel's Father	Short
1914	Twenty Minutes of Love	Pickpocket's Victim	Short
1914	Caught in a Cabaret	Mabel's Father	Short, Uncredited
1914	A Rowboat Romance		Short
1914	Laughing Gas	Patient	Short
1914	The Property Man	Old Stagehand	Short, Uncredited
1914	The Face on the Bar Room Floor	Drinker	Short, Uncredited
1914	Lover's Luck	The Girl's Father	Short
1914	Hello, Mabel	Man in Lobby	Short, Uncredited
1914	Tillie's Punctured Romance	Cinema spectator	Uncredited
1914	Fatty and Minnie He-Haw	Minta's father	Short
1915	Mabel and Fatty's Simple Life	Mabel's father	Short
1915	Mabel, Fatty and the Law	Desk Sergeant	Short
1915	Mabel and Fatty's Married Life	Minor Role	Short, Uncredited
1915	Hogan's Romance Upset	The Rival	Uncredited
1915	Love, Loot and Crash	Mary's Father, a Banker	Short
1916	A Social Cub	The Knight of Old	Short
1916	Haystacks and Steeples	The Minister	Short
1917	A Tale of Two Cities	Dr. Alexandre Manette	
1917	American Methods	Baron de Prefont	
1917	The Book Agent	Dr. Newdope	
1917	To Honor and Obey	James Hollis	
1917	The Soul of Satan	Chicago Stone	
1917	Because of a Woman	Col. Gwynne	
1917	His Mother's Boy	Tom Glenny	
1918	Keys of the Righteous	Paul Manning	
1918	Treasure of the Sea	Thomas Elkins	
1918	The White Man's Law	Suliman Ghengis	
1918	When a Woman Sins	Mortimer West	
1918	The Light of Western Stars	Padre Marcos	
1919	A Trick of Fate	Raoul Garson	
1919	The Lady of Red Butte	Delicate Hanson	
1919	Pretty Smooth	Judge	
1919	Snares of Paris	De Brionne	
1919	A Girl in Bohemia	Professor Bryce	
1919	A Woman of Pleasure	Rev. Mr. Goddard	
1919	The Last of His People	Baron Bonart	
1920	The Beggar Prince	Nodo	
1920	The Third Generation	Colonel Alden Van Dusen	
1920	Blind Youth	Pierre Monnier	
1920	Moon Madness	Latour	
1920	Trumpet Island	Jacques de Merincourt	
1921	The Four Horsemen of the Apocalypse	Marcelo Desnoyers	
1921	Sowing the Wind	Petworth	
1921	Beach of Dreams	Monsieur de Brie	
1921	Who Am I?	Jacques Marbot	
1921	Serenade	Domingo Maticas	
1921	Opened Shutters	Sam Lacey	
1921	No Woman Knows	The Great Schabelitz	
1921	Cheated Hearts	Colonel Fairfax Gordon	
1922	Across the Dead-Line	Abel	
1922	Oh, Mabel Behave	Townsman	Uncredited
1922	The Golden Gift	Leonati	
1922	The Adventures of Robinson Crusoe		Serial
1922	The Storm	Jacques Fachard	
1922	Another Man's Shoes	Gouret	
1922	The Young Rajah	Narada – the Mystic	
1922	Pawned	Paul Veniza	
1922	My American Wife	Don Fernando DeContas	
1923	Mr. Billings Spends His Dime	Estaban Juárez	
1923	Bavu	Prince Markoff	
1923	Daughters of the Rich	Maud's Father	
1923	The Cricket on the Hearth	Caleb Plummer	
1923	Mothers-in-Law	Newton Wingate	
1923	Forgive and Forget	John Standing	
1923	The Age of Desire	Marcio	
1923	The Eternal Struggle	Pierre Grange	
1923	A Prince of a King	Urbano	
1923	Maytime	Colonel Van Zandt	
1924	The Shadow of the Desert	John Locke	
1924	North of Nevada	Mark Ridgeway	
1924	Poisoned Paradise: The Forbidden Story of Monte Carlo	Professor Durand	
1924	Pal o' Mine	Verdugo Montford	
1924	A Boy of Flanders	Jan Van Dullan	
1924	Men	Cleo's Father	
1924	Untamed Youth	Pietro	
1924	Defying the Law	Michelo Brescia	
1924	Dante's Inferno	The Victim – Eugene Craig	
1925	Easy Money		
1925	The Sign of the Cactus	Old Man Hayes	
1925	Wizard of Oz	Prime Minister Kruel	
1925	The Verdict	Pierre Ronsard	
1925	She Wolves	De Goncourt	
1925	Fifth Avenue Models	Josef Ludant	
1925	Playing with Souls	Monsieur Jomier	
1925	The Mysterious Stranger	Raoul Lesage	
1925	The Three Way Trail		
1925	Off the Highway	Master	
1925	The Keeper of the Bees	Bee master	
1925	Northern Code	Père Le Blanc	
1926	Stop, Look and Listen	Old Actor	
1926	Three Pals	Col. Girard	
1926	The Night Watch	John Pendleton	
1926	Desert Gold	Sebastian Castaneda	
1926	Whispering Canyon	Eben Beauregard	
1926	Senor Daredevil	Juan Estrada	
1926	Don Juan	Duke Della Varnese	
1926	Officer Jim	The President of the Bank	
1926	The High Flyer		
1926	Kentucky Handicap		
1926	Devil's Dice	Judge Casper Paine	
1926	The Unknown Cavalier	Lingo	
1926	The Border Whirlwind	Señor Jose Cordova	
1927	Hotel Imperial	Austrian General	Uncredited
1927	One Increasing Purpose	Old Gand	
1927	The Golden Stallion	John Forsythe	
1927	The King of Kings		Uncredited
1927	False Morals		
1927	Senorita	Don Francisco Hernandez	
1927	Time to Love	Elvire's father	
1927	Old San Francisco	Don Hernandez de Vasquez	
1927	Get Your Man	Duke of Albin	
1927	Compassion	Judge Henning	
1928	Sharp Shooters	Grandpère	
1928	Comrades	John Burton	
1928	Turn Back the Hours	Colonel Torreon	
1928	Eagle of the Night		
1928	The Toy Shop	The toymaker	Short
1928	Dreary House		
1929	The Bachelor's Club		
1929	The Devil's Chaplain	The King	
1929	The Eternal Woman	Ovaldo	
1929	The Veiled Woman	Col. De Selincourt	
1929	Frozen River	Hazy	
1929	The Phantom of the North	Colonel Rayburn	
1929	Street Corner		Short
1929	Times Square	Professor Carrillo	
1929	Dark Skies	Señor Moreno	
1930	The Lone Defender	Juan Valdez	Serial, [Chs. 1–2]
1930	Mamba	Count von Linden	Uncredited
1930	Song of the Caballero	Manuel	
1930	The Phantom of the Desert	Col. Van Horn	
1933	The Narrow Corner	Dutch Constable	Uncredited
1933	Narcotic	Federal Narcotics Agent	
1933	The Perils of Pauline	Haggins, Foreign Consul	Serial, [Ch. 9]
1934	Beloved	Revolutionist	
1934	All Men Are Enemies	Katha's Father	Uncredited
1934	Cross Streets	Dean Todd	
1934	The Return of Chandu	Tyba – The White Magician	Serial, [Chs. 8–12]
1934	The Man Who Reclaimed His Head	French Citizen	Uncredited
1935	A Notorious Gentleman	Minor Role	Uncredited
1935	The Lost City	Dr. Manyus	
1935	A Dog of Flanders	Monsieur de LaTour	(replaced by Henry Kolker) (scenes deleted)
1935	Love Me Forever	Bonini	Uncredited
1935	The Crusades	Buyer	Uncredited
1936	Custer's Last Stand	Major Henry Trent MD	Serial
1936	The Millionaire Kid	The Tutor	
1936	Caryl of the Mountains	Jean Foray	
1936	Lash of the Penitentes	Dr. Andrew Robert Taylor	
1936	The Black Coin	Don Pedro Navarro	Serial, [Chs. 2–4, 13–15]
1936	Under Your Spell	Amigo	Uncredited
1936	The Boss Rider of Gun Creek	Lafe Turner	
1937	Sandflow	Banker Porter	
1937	Fit for a King	Sanitarium Director	Uncredited
1937	The Sheik Steps Out	Mohammedan Priest	Uncredited
1937	The Girl Said No	Jonesy	
1937	Zorro Rides Again	Dam Watchman	Serial, [Ch. 8], Uncredited
1938	The Secret of Treasure Island	Passenger Ship Doctor	Chapter 1, Uncredited
1938	You Can't Take It with You	Professor	
1938	Say It in French	Old Man	Uncredited
1939	Mexicali Rose	Gonzales	Uncredited
1939	Dick Tracy's G-Men	Presidente Huenemo Mendoza	Serial, Chapter 3, Uncredited
1939	$1,000 a Touchdown	Hamilton McGlen Sr.	Uncredited
1939	The Pal from Texas	Texas Malden	
1939	The Great Victor Herbert	Newspaper Reporter	Uncredited
1939	The Mad Empress	Mexican Statesman with Father Fisher	Uncredited, (final film role)
