= Hoffmeyer's Legacy =

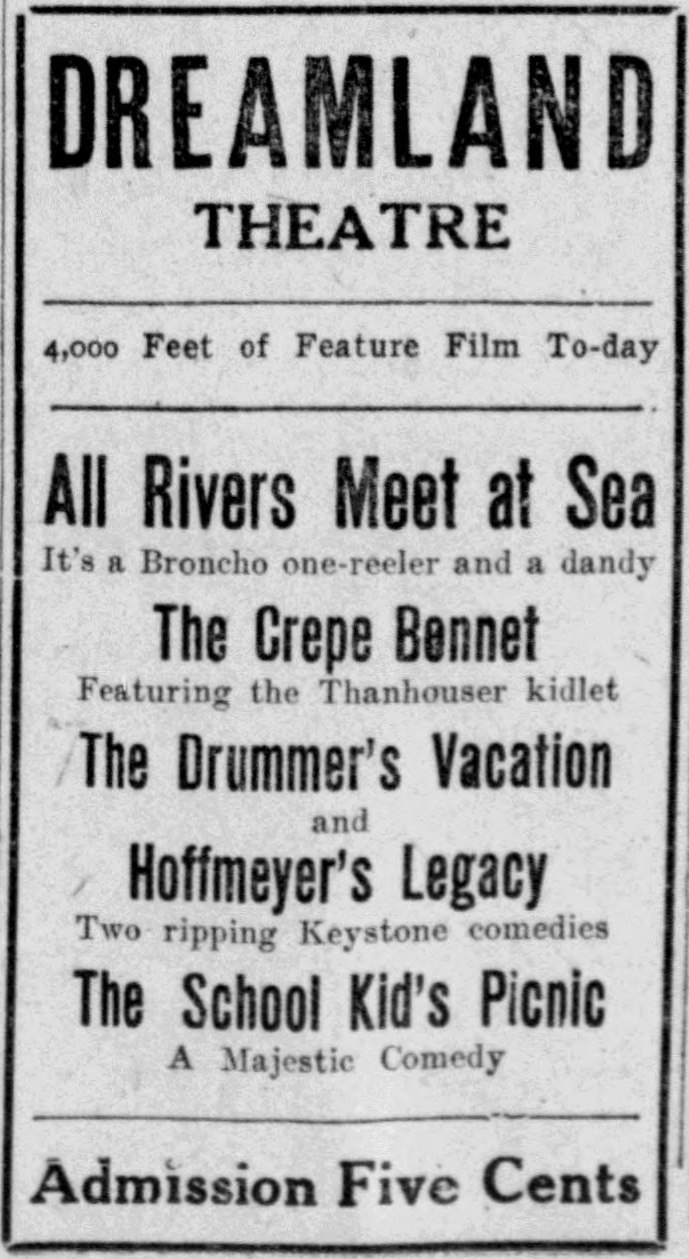
- Contemporary advertisement for Hoffmeyer's Legacy and others
- Directed by: Mack Sennett
- Starring: Ford Sterling; The Keystone Cops
- Release date: December 23, 1912
- Country: United States
- Language: English

Hoffmeyer's Legacy is a 1912 comedy short directed by Mack Sennett, notable for being the first Keystone Cops comedy. However, many consider the first real Keystone Cop comedy to be The Bangville Police (1913).

== Plot ==
Hoffmeyer inherits $500, and his wife tries to prevent him from spending it all.

== Cast ==
- Ford Sterling ... Hoffmeyer
- Charles Avery ... Keystone Kop
- Bobby Dunn ... Keystone Kop
- Chester M. Franklin ... Man in police station
- George Jeske ... Keystone Kop
- Fred Mace ... Hoffmeyer's wife (in drag)
- Edgar Kennedy ... Keystone Kop
- Hank Mann ... Keystone Kop
- Mack Riley ... Keystone Kop
- Mack Sennett ... Police Chief
- Slim Summerville ... Keystone Kop
