= At It Again (film) =

1912 American silent film

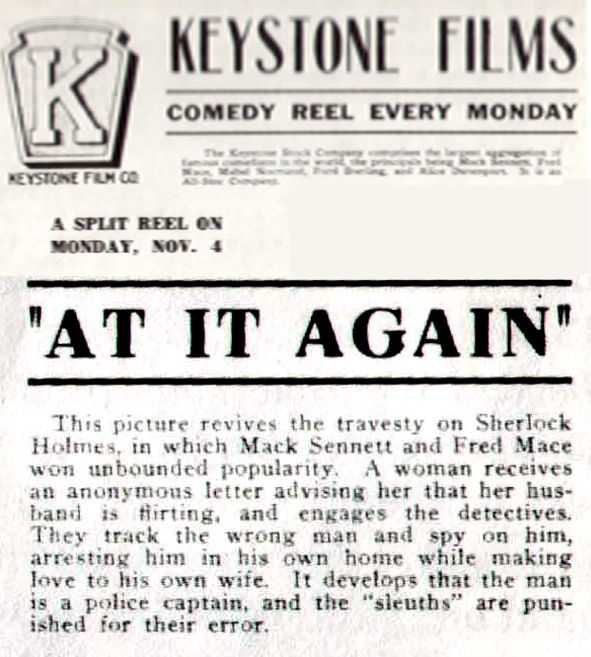
- Keystone Films Ad
- Directed by: Mack Sennett
- Produced by: Mack Sennett
- Starring: Fred Mace; Mack Sennett; Ford Sterling; Mabel Normand; Alice Davenport
- Production company: The Keystone Film Company
- Distributed by: Mutual Film Corporation
- Release dates: November 4, 1912; split reel with Mabel's Lovers
- Running time: 6 minutes
- Country: United States
- Language: Silent

At It Again is a 1912 American short silent comedy film produced and directed by Mack Sennett. The film stars Fred Mace, Mack Sennett, Ford Sterling, Mabel Normand and Alice Davenport.

It was distributed by the Mutual Film Corporation. The film was the first Keystone Film comedy that featured the two bumbling detectives.

The film was released on November 4, 1912; in a split reel with Mabel's Lovers. Silent Era reports the survival status of the film as unknown.

It's notable that Sennett headed two of the most influential American slapstick film studios: the Keystone Film Company (1912–1917), and Mack Sennett Comedies (1917–1933).

== Plot ==
Mrs. Smith receives an anonymous letter stating that her husband is untrue to her, and she calls upon the detectives to shadow him. Mr. Smith comes home and, finding his wife away, goes out to look for her in his shirt sleeves. Mrs. Smith points him out to the detectives, and they start on his trail.

In the meantime, Larkins, a police captain, is at home with his wife, and goes out to buy some ice cream, also in his shirt sleeves. As Mr. Smith enters a house Larkin comes out, just as the detectives turn the corner, and they, thinking Larkin is Smith, follow him.

When Larkin returns home his fond wife makes much of him, all of which is noted by the detectives at the window. They finally decide to arrest him, and a furious scene is raised by the indignant Larkin and his wife, but to no avail, for Larkin is dragged off.

In the meantime, they have notified Mrs. Smith and she is on the way to meet them with three policemen, and Smith himself comes up at the same time. When Larkin and Smith get through with the detectives, they have learned the painful lesson that it does not pay for a detective to make a mistake.

== Cast ==
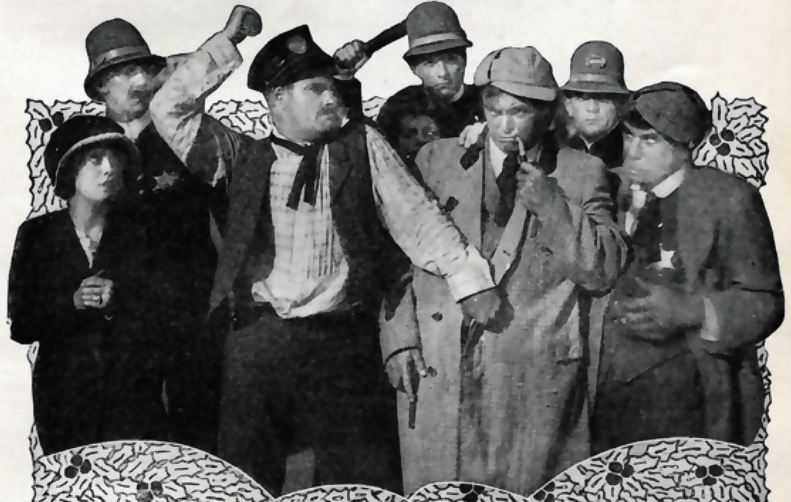
In foreground, Mabel Normand, Ford Sterling, Fred Mace and Mack Sennett.

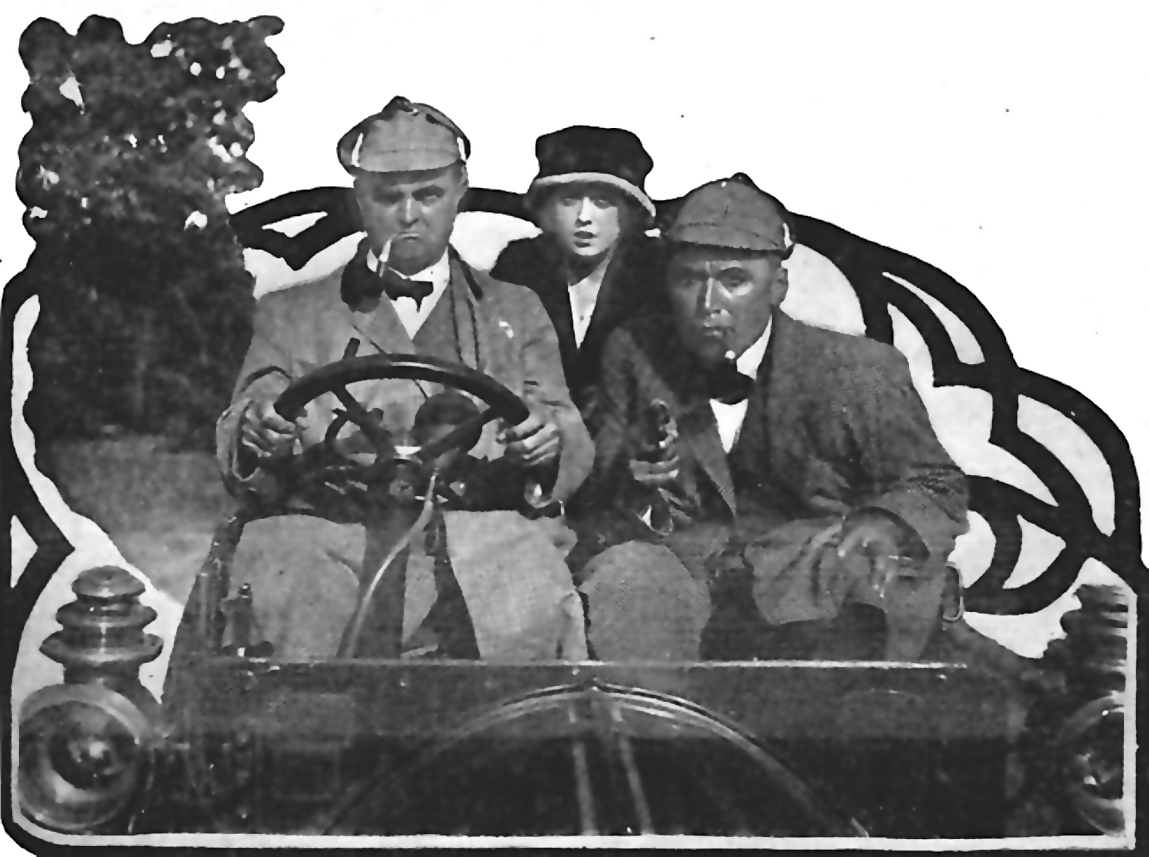
Mace and Sennett, the dopey detectives, in car with Normand

- Fred Mace - Myred Face, sleuth
- Mack Sennett - Sack Mennet, sleuth
- Ford Sterling - Police Chief Larkin
- Mabel Normand - Mrs. Smith
- Alice Davenport - woman

== Production and background ==
Producer and director Sennett had previously been at the Biograph Company of New York City, where he first introduced the "dopey detectives" slapstick film genre, as seen in the films; Trailing the Counterfeiter, Their First Divorce Case and Caught with the Goods.

Six weeks after Sennett opened Keystone Studios in Edendale, California in 1912, he reintroduced the pair of dopey detectives. The first Keystone Film comedy featuring the two Sherlocks was At It Again.

== Reviews ==
The Moving Picture World said of the film, "Two amateur Sherlock Holmes detectives dominate this picture with their antics. They succeed in jumbling the plot somewhat, but as they are really funny, and the plot is not important, they may be forgiven."

== See also ==
- 1912 in film
- Keystone Cops
- Mack Sennett filmography
- Silent film

== Sources ==
- Chalmers, J. P., ed. (October 26, 1912). "Mutual Film Corporation Keystone: At it Again". The Moving Picture World. Vol. 14, no. 4. Chalmers Publishing Company.
