= Neptune's Naughty Daughter =

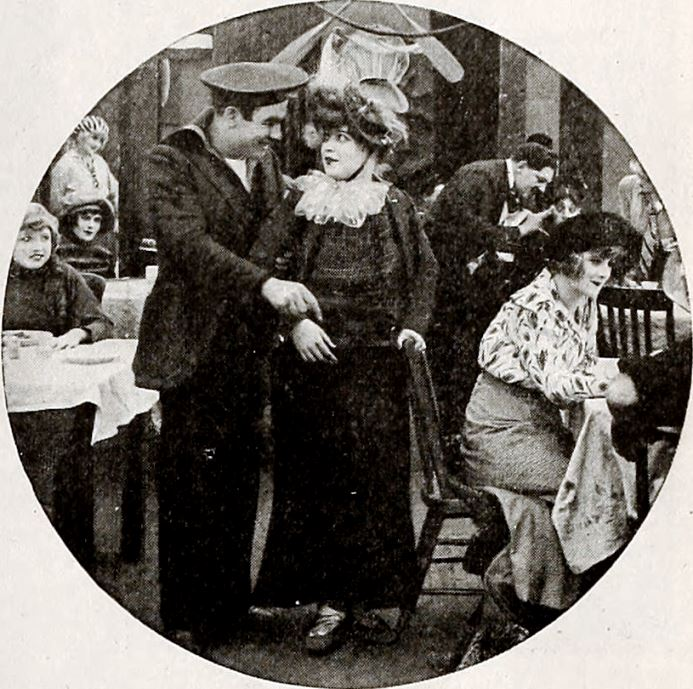
- Still from the film Neptune's Naughty Daughter
- Directed by: John G. Blystone
- Produced by: Abe Stern, Julius Stern
- Starring: Alice Howell; Robert McKenzie
- Production company: L-KO Kompany
- Release date: November 1, 1917

Neptune's Naughty Daughter is a 1917 American silent comedy film directed by John G. Blystone and starring Alice Howell and Robert McKenzie.

== Plot ==
Alice (Howell) is the daughter of a fisherman. Joe, a sailor, loves Alice and takes her to the cabaret. There a sea captain meets her and is smitten.

Later, Alice and Bob are married. The captain, however, is still obsessed with Alice and kidnaps her onto his ship. Joe pursues the ship and rescues Alice.

== Cast ==
- Alice Howell
- Robert McKenzie
- Eva McKenzie
- Joe Moore
- Fatty Voss
- Ida Mae McKenzie

== Preservation Status ==
In 2014, a print of Neptune's Naughty Daughter was among the films discovered in the collection of the EYE Film Institute Netherlands, Amsterdam.

== Reception ==
Moving Picture World wrote: "Miss Howell will go under water to get laughs." "[She] has demonstrated her fearless daring in performing stunts as hazardous and difficult as any man has ever undertaken... She knows how to get laughs out of every situation where a laugh may possibly be planted."
