= Street Corner =

A streetcorner or street corner is the location beside a road intersection.

Street Corner may refer to:

- Street Corner (1929 film), a black-and-white short film
- Street Corner (1948 film), a drama exploitation film
- Street Corner (1953 film), a black-and-white drama film
