= L-KO Motion Picture Company =

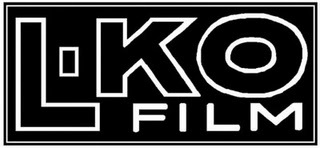
Logo for the L-KO Kompany

The L-KO Motion Picture Company, also known as the L-KO Kompany, was an American motion picture company founded by Henry Lehrman. It produced silent one-, two- and very occasionally three-reel comedy shorts between 1914 and 1919, released by Universal Pictures. The initials L-KO stand for "Lehrman—Knock Out".

== History ==
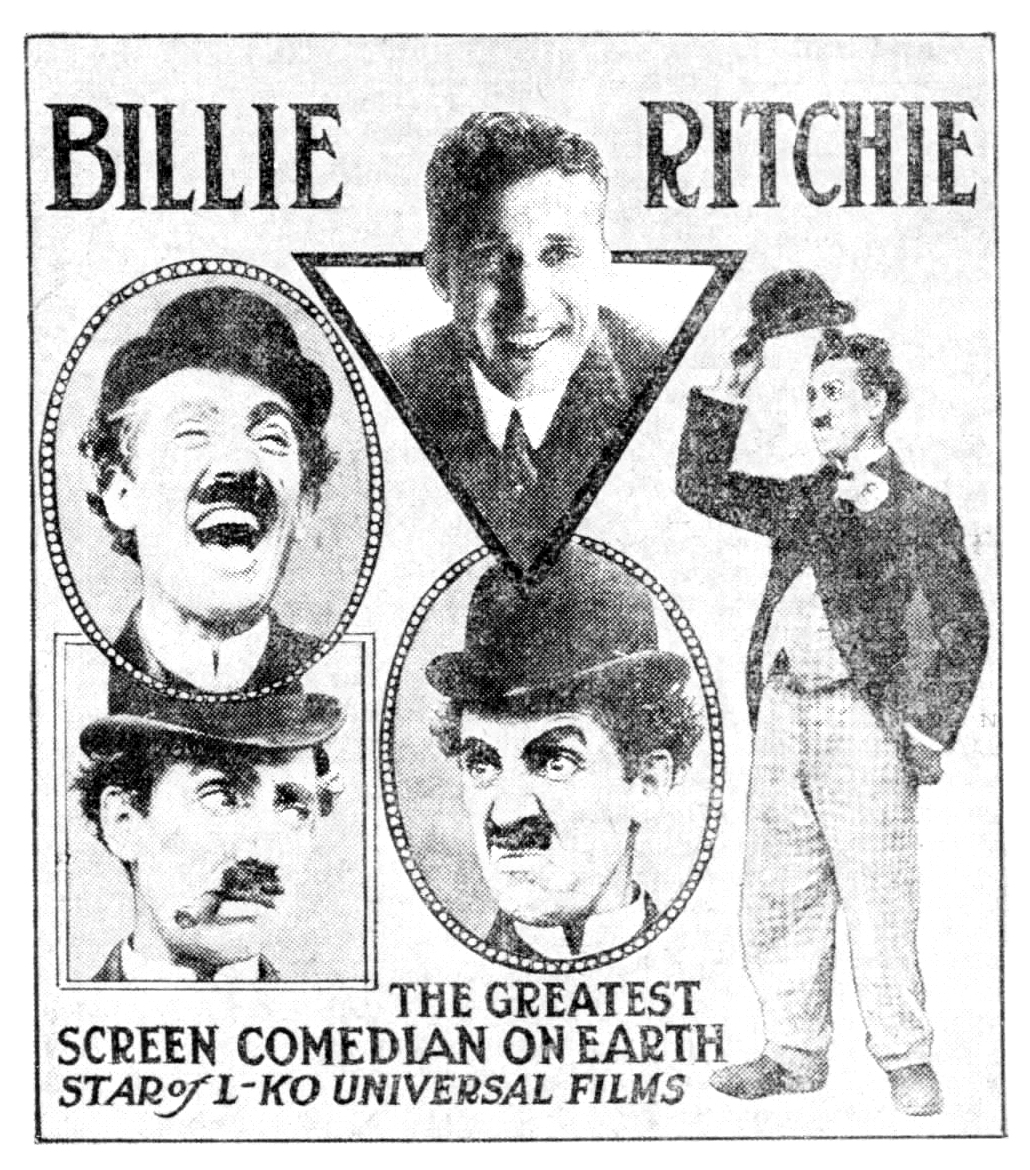
1915 advertisement for Billie Ritchie in L-KO Universal films

By the spring of 1914, Henry "Pathé" Lehrman had directed several important Keystone Cops comedies including The Bangville Police (1913) and Kid Auto Races at Venice (1914), Charlie Chaplin's debut. Wooed away from Mack Sennett by producer Fred J. Balshofer, Lehrman left Keystone, along with star performer Ford Sterling, to found Sterling Comedies under the umbrella of the Universal Film and Manufacturing Co., later Universal Pictures. After a relatively short time, Lehrman was fired from Sterling Comedies and founded L-KO as a separate unit within Universal.

L-KO's first comedy star was veteran English comic Billie Ritchie, who had played the role of the drunk in Fred Karno's stage production A Night in the English Music Hall before Chaplin did. Ritchie made his film debut in the first L-KO production, Love and Surgery, released October 25, 1914. Also making their first films in this venture were Gertrude Selby, a comedian who became the main female foil in L-KO comedies, and Fatty Voss, L-KO's answer to Roscoe "Fatty" Arbuckle. Louise Orth, who had appeared in some Biograph comedies and would go on to appear in many L-KO's, was also aboard for the first release. Before long this group of performers was joined by Hank Mann and other disaffected talent from Mack Sennett's "fun factory," such as Alice Howell, Harry Gribbon and ultimately Mack Swain, whose "Ambrose" character continued at L-KO for a time. Henry Bergman had made one picture with Phillips Smalley before turning up at L-KO; not long after he would join Charlie Chaplin's regular troupe of character actors.

Lehrman proved even more frugal with budget than Sennett had been, and he favored a rough-and-tumble style of slapstick that reputedly resulted in injury. Author Kalton C. Lahue reported that there were stunt persons and bit players of the time who would not answer a call from L-KO owing to the possibility of danger; stuntman Harvey Parry referred to the producer as "Suicide" Lehrman. Lehrman eventually brought on directors John G. Blystone, Harry Edwards and David Kirkland to help raise the total output of L-KO, but stingily refused to award directors credit for L-KO films.

As the result of yet another dispute—this time with executives at Universal—Lehrman left L-KO towards the end of 1916 and took over the Sunshine Comedies unit at Fox. After Lehrman's departure, L-KO was taken over by Julius and Abe Stern—brothers-in-law to Universal's founder Carl Laemmle—and they named John G. Blystone director-in-chief. Blystone headed L-KO for a few months but he ultimately went to Fox Sunshine as well. L-KO nonetheless kept going for quite some time and proved a valuable training ground for new or developing comedy talent. Director Charles Parrott, better known as Charley Chase, came onto the L-KO lot in August 1918 and directed a few subjects through to near the end of L-KO's existence. Dapper comic Raymond Griffith made his film debut at L-KO in 1915 and comedian Eva Novak did so in 1917. Even Fatty Voss managed to direct one two-reeler, Fatty's Feature Fillum, just before his untimely death in 1917. He, thus, spent his entire film career at L-KO.

What finally brought around the end of L-KO was not Lehrman's departure, nor declining receipts for L-KO's product, but an outbreak of Spanish flu on the lot, which forced Universal to shut the whole studio down. L-KO's last release, An Oriental Romeo (1919) starring Chinese funnyman Chai Hong, was released on September 24, 1919, though the studio had already been closed for good in May.

== Legacy ==
While L-KO never had a break-out star as prominent as Charlie Chaplin, in nearly every other way it was successful in competing with Keystone; moreover, as Mack Sennett broke with the Triangle Film Corporation in July, 1917, L-KO managed to outlast Keystone by a year. However, it remains an extremely obscure Silent Comedy brand. Although L-KO produced around 300 titles in its five-year existence; little more than 10 percent of these films are known to exist today. Given Lehrman's preference for violent sight gags and Ritchie's confrontational style of humor, surviving L-KO films stand as some of the edgiest and darkest entries in the annals of American Silent Comedy.

== Confirmed extant and lost films ==
Billie Ritchie in Almost a Scandal, released in 1915

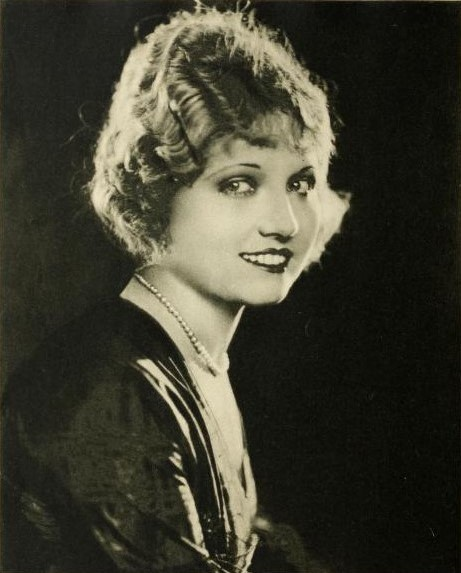
Silent film star Eva Novak made her film debut with L-KO in Roped into Scandal (1917). Another of her films with L-KO, The Sign of the Cucumber, survives.

Title	Release date	Director	Star	Notes
Love and Surgery	October 25, 1914	Henry Lehrman	Billie Ritchie	Survives
Partners in Crime	November 1, 1914	Henry Lehrman	Billie Ritchie	Survives
The Fatal Marriage	November 8, 1914	Henry Lehrman (unconfirmed)	Billie Ritchie	Lost
Lizzy’s Escape	November 11, 1914	Henry Lehrman (unconfirmed)	Billie Ritchie	Lost
The Groom's Doom	November 22, 1914	[?]	Billie Ritchie	Lost
The Blighted Spaniard	November 29, 1914	[?]	[?]	Lost
Fido's Dramatic Career	December 6, 1914	[?]	[?]	Lost
Adventures of Uncle	December 11, 1914	[?]	Ernest Shields	
The Rural Demons	December 13, 1914	Henry Lehrman	Billie Ritchie	Survives
The Baron's Bear Escape	December 20, 1914	[?]	Henry Bergman	Survives
The Manicure Girl	December 27, 1914	[?]	Louise Orth	Lost
Gem and Germs	January 3, 1915	Henry Lehrman	Louise Orth	Lost
Cupid in a Hospital	January 6, 1915	Henry Lehrman	Billie Ritchie	Survives
Through a Knot Hole	January 10, 1915		Billie Ritchie	Lost
Thou Shalt Not Flirt	January 13, 1915	Henry Lehrman	Billie Ritchie	Lost
Almost a Scandal	February 17, 1915	Henry Lehrman	Billie Ritchie	
Poor Policy	April 25, 1915	Harry Edwards	Billie Ritchie	
Love and Sour Notes	May 19, 1915	John G. Blystone	Billie Ritchie	
The Child Needs a Mother	July 7, 1915	John G. Blystone	Fatty Voss	
Vendetta in a Hospital	September 8, 1915		Billie Ritchie	
Silk Hose and High Pressure	September 8, 1915	Henry Lehrman	Billie Ritchie	
No Flirting Allowed	September 19, 1915		Hank Mann	
A Tale of Twenty Stories	August 22, 1915	Vin Moore	Hank Mann	fragment only
Sin on the Sabbath	December 8, 1915		Billie Ritchie	
Twenty Minutes at the Fair	February 20, 1916		Billie Ritchie	Condensed version exists at BFI
A Stool Pigeon's Revenge	May 12, 1916	John G. Blystone	Hank Mann	
Gertie's Gasoline Glide	May 17, 1916		Gertrude Selby	
Billie's Waterloo	June 7, 1916		Billie Ritchie	
Cold Hearts and Hot Flames	September 20, 1916	John G. Blystone	Billie Ritchie	
Live Wires and Love Sparks	March 19, 1916	Henry Lehrman	Billie Ritchie	
Bombs and Bandits	1917	Vin Moore	Billy Bevan	
The Sign of the Cucumber	1917	Richard Smith	Eva Novak	
Soapsuds and Sirens	1917	Noel M. Smith	Harry Lorraine and Walter Stephens||	
The Belles of Liberty	1917	James D. Davis	Eva Novak	
All Jazzed Up	1917	William Watson	Eva Novak	
Adventurous Ambrose	April 17, 1918	Walter S. Fredericks	Mack Swain	
The King of the Kitchen	December 4, 1918	Frank Griffin	Harry Gribbon	
Charlie, the Little Daredevil	January 15, 1919	Alfred J. Goulding	Chai Hong	
The Freckled Fish	January 22, 1919	Joseph Le Brandt	Chai Hong	fragment only

== See also ==
- Henry Lehrman
