= Alice Howell =

American film actress (1886–1961)

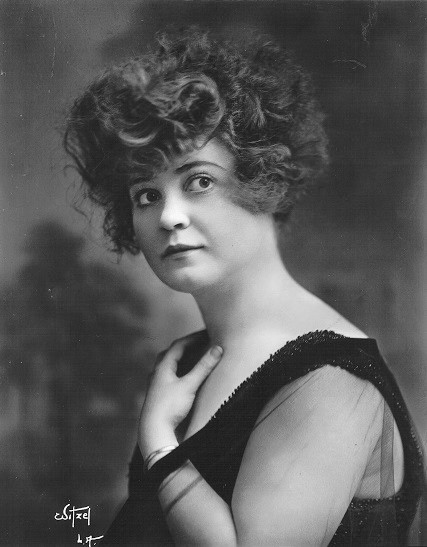
- Howell in 1920
- Born: Alice Florence Clark; May 20, 1886; New York City, U.S.
- Died: April 12, 1961 (aged 74); Los Angeles, California, U.S.
- Resting place: Forest Lawn Memorial Park (Hollywood Hills)
- Occupation: Actress
- Years active: 1914–1933
- Spouses: Richard Smith (m. 1922; died 1937) Benjamin Vincent Shevlin (divorced)
- Children: Yvonne Howell

Alice Howell (born Alice Florence Clark; May 20, 1886 – April 12, 1961) was a silent film comedy actress from New York City. She was the mother of actress Yvonne Howell.

== Biography ==
Early reviews of her movies describe her as "the scream of the screen". One reviewer likened her to a "sort of Charlie Chaplin, Douglas Fairbanks Sr., and Max Linder." All this was compressed into "one more or less diminutive package of femininity". Sometimes called "the girl Charlie Chaplin", she worked for Mack Sennett and later L-KO Kompany. Her early comedies were often produced by Universal Pictures.

== Career ==
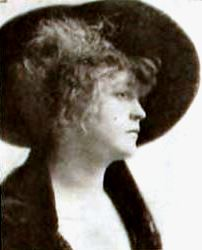
Alice Howell in 1920

At Mack Sennett's Keystone Film Company, Howell quickly worked her way up from crowd scenes to featured parts in shorts such as Charlie Chaplin's Laughing Gas (1914 film), and starred in at least one, Shot in the Excitement (1914). Hired away by Sennett's former second-in-command, Henry Lehrman, when he set up the L-KO Kompany, Howell was cast to support Billie Ritchie and became popular in her own one-reelers.

By 1917, she was such an audience favorite that Julius and Abe Stern formed Century Comedies to showcase her talents, making her, along with Mabel Normand and Marie Dressler, the third comedienne to have her own exclusive production unit. After Howell and Century parted ways in 1919, the company continued turning out comedy shorts and was renamed Stern Brothers Comedies in 1926.

In 1919, Howell moved to the independent Emerald Company, which became part of the Reelcraft Corporation and released her still extant film, Distilled Love (1920). Howell's last starring series was a group of 1924–25 domestic comedies for Universal Pictures featuring a married couple and their goofy butler. When this series ended, she appeared in one last short, Madame Dynamite (1926), for Fox Film Corporation.

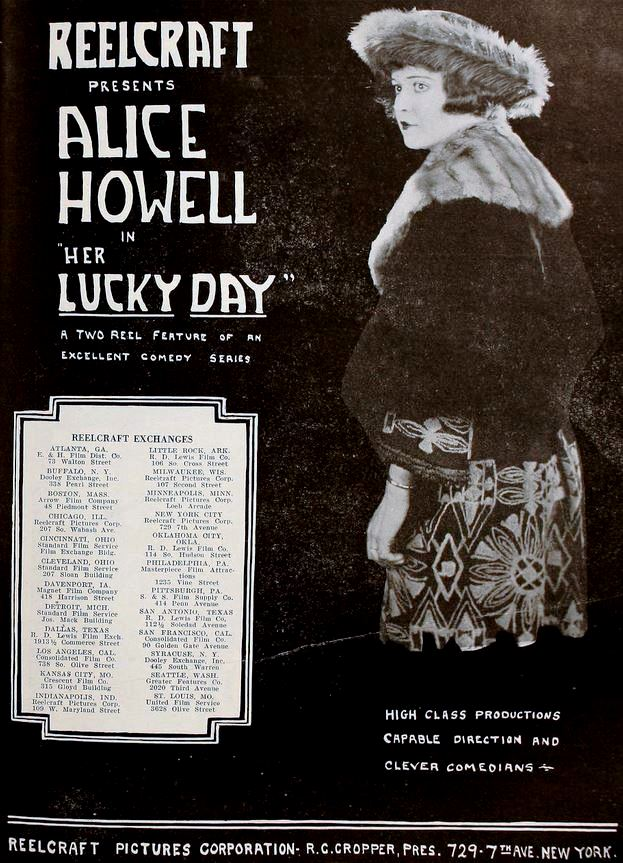
Ad for the American comedy short film Her Lucky Day (1920) with Alice Howell, on page 4275 of the May 22, 1920 Motion Picture News.

Among more than 100 screen credits, Howell made such motion pictures as Caught in a Cabaret (1914), Mabel and Fatty's Married Life (1915), Neptune's Naughty Daughter (1917), Green Trees (1924), and Madame Dynamite (1926). Her Bareback Career (1917) was the first of 12 two-reel comedies for a new corporation which was formed to manufacture and distribute Alice Howell comedies.

Howell's film career continued into the sound-movie era with a role as a mute servant of the master murderer in the motion picture The Black Ace (1933).

== Death ==
Howell died in Los Angeles, California, in 1961, aged 74.

== Partial filmography ==
- Tillie's Punctured Romance (1914) as Guest (uncredited)
- Bombs and Bangs (1914)
- Lover's Luck (1914)
- Laughing Gas (1914)
- Caught in the Rain (1914)
- Shot in the Excitement (1914)
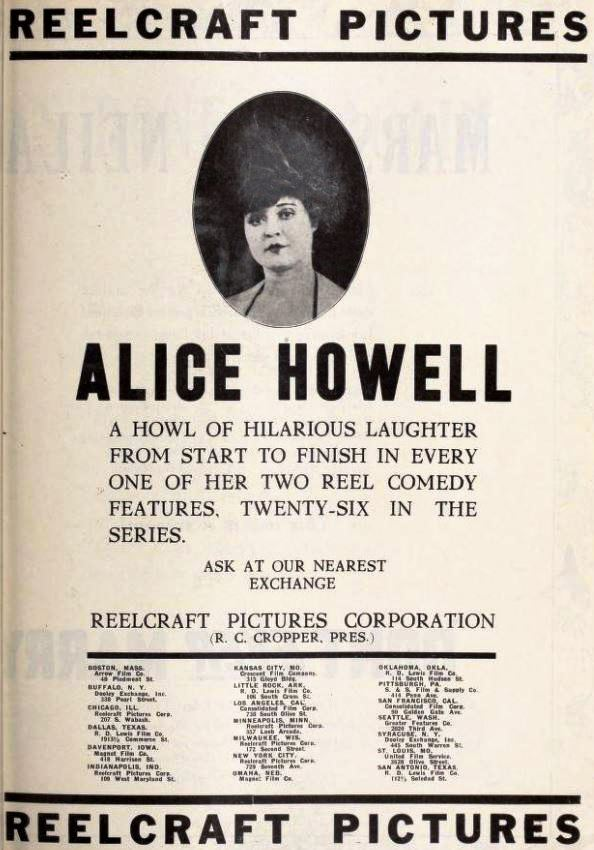
- Advertisement promoting the comedy films of Alice Howell, on page 19 of the April 24, 1920 Exhibitors Herald.
  Caught in a Cabaret (1914)
- Mabel and Fatty's Married Life (1915)
- Father was a Loafer (1915)
- Under new Management (1915)
- How Stars are Made (1916)
- Her Bareback Career (1917)
- Neptune's Naughty Daughter (1917)
- In Dutch (1918)
- Distilled Love (1920)
- His Wooden Legacy (1920)
- Her Lucky Day (1920)
- Cinderella Slippers (1920)
- A Convict's Happy Bride (1920)
- Love Is an Awful Thing (1922)
- Wandering Daughters (1923)
- Green Trees (1924)
- The Pride of the Force (1925)
- Under a Spell (1925)
- Madame Dynamite (1926)
