= The Gangsters =

1913 film

- Directed by: Henry Lehrman
- Produced by: Mack Sennett
- Starring: Roscoe "Fatty" Arbuckle
- Release date: May 29, 1913
- Country: United States
- Language: Silent with English intertitles

The Gangsters is a 1913 American short comedy film featuring Roscoe "Fatty" Arbuckle as one of the Keystone Cops.

== Cast ==
- Roscoe "Fatty" Arbuckle
- Nick Cogley
- Fred Mace
- Hank Mann
- Ford Sterling
- Al St. John

== See also ==
- Fatty Arbuckle filmography
