= When Dreams Come True =

When Dreams Come True may refer to:

- When Dreams Come True (1913 film), 1913 American short film
- When Dreams Come True (1929 film), 1929 American silent film
- When Dreams Come True (musical), 1913 Broadway musical
