= A Rowboat Romance =

1914 film

- Directed by: Fatty Arbuckle
- Starring: Fatty Arbuckle
- Distributed by: Keystone Studios
- Release date: July 6, 1914
- Running time: 1 reel (959 feet), approximately 14 minutes
- Country: United States
- Languages: Silent; English intertitles

A Rowboat Romance is a 1914 American short comedy film directed by and starring Fatty Arbuckle.

== Cast ==
- Roscoe "Fatty" Arbuckle
- Slim Summerville
- Mack Swain
- Josef Swickard

== See also ==
- List of American films of 1914
- Fatty Arbuckle filmography
