= Slim Summerville =

American actor (1892–1946)

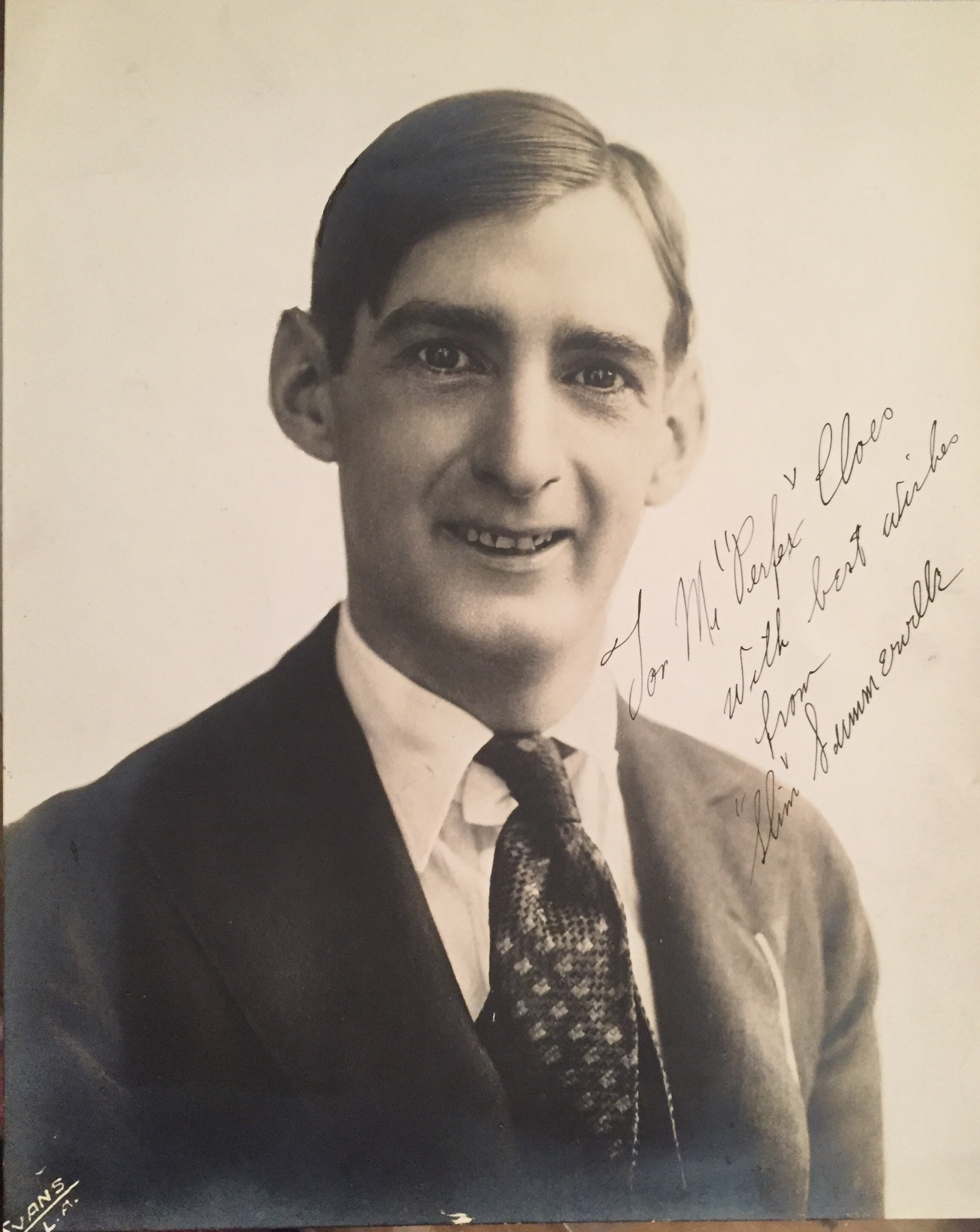
- Summerville in 1918
- Born: George Joseph Somerville; July 10, 1892; Albuquerque, Territory of New Mexico, U.S.
- Died: January 5, 1946 (aged 53); Laguna Beach, California, U.S.
- Occupations: Actor, director
- Years active: 1912–1946
- Spouses: Gertrude Roell (m. 1927; div. 1936) Eleanor Brown (m. 1937)
- Children: 1 (adopted)

Slim Summerville (born George Joseph Somerville; July 10, 1892 – January 5, 1946) was an American film actor and director best known for his work in comedies.

== Early life ==
Summerville was born in Albuquerque, New Mexico, where his mother died when he was only five. Moving from New Mexico to Canada and later to Oklahoma, he had a nomadic upbringing. In Canada, in Chatham, Ontario, he lived with his English grandparents and obtained his first job there, working as a messenger for the Canadian Pacific Telegraphs.

== Film career ==
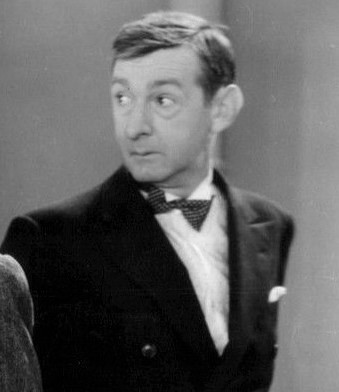
Summerville in Little Accident (1930)

The beginning of Summerville's three-decade screen career can be traced to another early job he had, one working in a poolroom in California. There in 1912 he met actor Edgar Kennedy, who took him to see Mack Sennett, the head of Keystone Studios in Edendale. Sennett immediately hired him for $3.50 per day to perform in bit parts, his first being in the role of a "Keystone Cop" in the short Hoffmeyer's Legacy. Tall and gangly, Summerville used his physical appearance to great effect in many comedies during both the silent and sound eras. His work in films, however, was not limited to acting; he also directed more than 50 productions, mostly shorts.

Her First Kiss (1919) with Ethel Teare

Occasionally, Summerville played in dramatic films, such as All Quiet on the Western Front (1930) and Jesse James (1939), but he was most successful in comedies, including several with ZaSu Pitts. He also performed with child star Shirley Temple in the musical-comedy dramas Captain January (1936) and Rebecca of Sunnybrook Farm (1938).

== Personal life ==
Summerville married Gertrude Martha Roell on 19 November 1927. Five years later they adopted a four-week-old baby boy whom they christened Elliott George. The couple divorced in September 1936, and the following year Summerville married Eleanor Brown, a nurse who had cared for him while he was sick.

=== Death ===
Summerville died of a stroke on January 5, 1946, in Laguna Beach, California. He is buried at Inglewood Park Cemetery in South Los Angeles community of Inglewood, California. Two decades after his death, his beach-front house on Sleepy Hollow Lane in Laguna Beach was converted into the Beach House restaurant, which was later renamed the Driftwood Kitchen.

== Legacy ==
For his contribution to the motion picture industry, Slim Summerville has a star on the Hollywood Walk of Fame at 6409 Hollywood Blvd.

He was inducted into the New Mexico Entertainment Hall of Fame in 2012.

== Selected filmography ==
- Hoffmeyer's Legacy (1912, Short) as Keystone Kop (uncredited)
- Mabel's Busy Day (1914, Short) as Policeman (uncredited)
- Fatty and the Heiress (1914, Short)
- A Rowboat Romance (1914, Short)
- Laughing Gas (1914, Short) as Pedestrian / Patient
- Those Happy Days (1914, Short) as Cop (uncredited)
- Lover's Luck (1914, Short) as Villager
- Dough and Dynamite (1914) as Striking Baker (uncredited)
- Tillie's Punctured Romance (1914) as Policeman / Guest in Restaurant (uncredited)
- Leading Lizzie Astray (1914, Short) as Dancing Cafe Patron (uncredited)
- Fatty's Magic Pants (1914, Short) as Cop (uncredited)
- Fatty and Minnie He-Haw (1914, Short) as Railroad Guard (uncredited)
- Fatty's New Role (1915, Short) as Bartender
- That Little Band of Gold (1915, Short) as Waiter / Audience Member (uncredited)
- Their Social Splash (1915, Short) as Harold - the Groom
- Her Painted Hero (1915, Short) as A Bill Poster
- Fatty and the Broadway Stars (1915, Short) as Striking Carpenter
- Hearts and Sparks (1916, Short) as The Moneylender's Pit Crewman
- His Bread and Butter (1916, Short) as Cafe owner
- Are Waitresses Safe? (1917)
- Skirts (1921)
- Hello, 'Frisco (1924, also directed, Short) as Slim
- The Texas Streak (1926) as Swede
- The Denver Dude (1927) as Slim Jones
- The Beloved Rogue (1927) as Jehan
- Hey! Hey! Cowboy (1927) as Spike Doolin
- Painted Ponies (1927) as Beanpole
- The Chinese Parrot (1927) as Prospector
- The Wreck of the Hesperus (1927)
- Riding for Fame (1928) as High-Pockets
- The Last Warning (1928) as Tommy Wall
- King of the Rodeo (1929) as Slim
- Strong Boy (1929) as Slim
- Sailor's Holiday (1929) as Midway Photographer (uncredited)
- One Hysterical Night (1929) as Robin Hood
- The Shannons of Broadway (1929) as Newt
- Tiger Rose (1929) as Heine
- Troopers Three (1930) as 'Sunny'
- The King of Jazz (1930) as Automobile Owner ('Springtime') / Rear End of Horse / Charles
- All Quiet on the Western Front (1930) as Tjaden
- The Little Accident (1930) as Hicks
- Under Montana Skies (1930) as Sunshine
- The Spoilers (1930) as Slapjack Simms
- Her Man (1930) as The Swede
- See America Thirst (1930) as Slim
- Free Love (1930) as Gas Inspector
- Many a Slip (1931) as Hopkins
- The Front Page (1931) as Irving Pincus
- El Tenorio del harem (1931) as El corneta
- Bad Sister (1931) as Sam
- Lasca of the Rio Grande (1931) as 'Crabapple' Thompson
- Reckless Living (1931) as The Drunk
- Heaven on Earth (1931) as The Jeweler
- The Unexpected Father (1932) as Jasper Jones
- Racing Youth (1932) as Slim
- Tom Brown of Culver (1932) as Elmer (Slim) Whitman
- Air Mail (1932) as 'Slim' McCune
- They Just Had to Get Married (1932) as Sam Sutton
- Out All Night (1933) as Ronald Colgate
- Horse Play (1933) as Slim Perkins
- Her First Mate (1933) as John Homer
- Love, Honor, and Oh Baby! (1933) as Mark Reed
- Love Birds (1934) as Henry Whipple
- Their Big Moment (1934) as Bill Ambrose
- Life Begins at 40 (1935) as T. Watterson Meriwether
- The Farmer Takes a Wife (1935) as Fortune Friendly
- Way Down East (1935) as Constable Seth Holcomb
- The Country Doctor (1936) as Constable Jim Ogden
- Captain January (1936) as Captain Nazro
- White Fang (1936) as Slats Magee
- Pepper (1936) as Uncle Ben Jolly
- Can This Be Dixie? (1936) as Robert E. Lee Gurgle
- Reunion (1936) as Jim Ogden
- Off to the Races (1937) as Uncle George
- Love Is News (1937) as Judge Hart
- The Road Back (1937) as Tjaden
- Fifty Roads to Town (1937) as Ed Henry
- Rebecca of Sunnybrook Farm (1938) as Homer Busby
- Kentucky Moonshine (1938) as Hank Hatfield
- Five of a Kind (1938) as Jim Ogden
- Submarine Patrol (1938) as Ellsworth 'Spuds' Fickett - Cook
- Up the River (1938) as Slim Nelson
- Jesse James (1939) as Jailer
- Winner Take All (1939) as Mike Muldoon
- Charlie Chan in Reno (1939) as Sheriff Fletcher
- Henry Goes Arizona (1939) as Sheriff Parton
- Anne of Windy Poplars (1940) as Jabez Monkman
- Gold Rush Maisie (1940) as Fred Gubbins
- Western Union (1941) as Herman
- Tobacco Road (1941) as Peabody
- Puddin' Head (1941) as Uncle Lem
- Highway West (1941) as Gramps Abbott
- Niagara Falls (1941) as Sam Sawyer
- Miss Polly (1941) as Slim Wilkins
- Uncle Joe (1941) as Joe Butterworth
- The Valley of Vanishing Men (1942, Serial) as Missouri Benson
- Garden of Eatin' (1943, Short) as Slim
- Bachelor Daze (1944, Short) as Slim Winters
- Bride by Mistake (1944) as Samuel
- Swing in the Saddle (1944) as Northup 'Slim' Bayliss
- I'm from Arkansas (1944) as Juniper Jenkins a.k.a. Pa
- Sing Me a Song of Texas (1945) as Happy
- The Hoodlum Saint (1946) as Eel (final film role)
