= Mabel and Fatty's Married Life =

1915 film

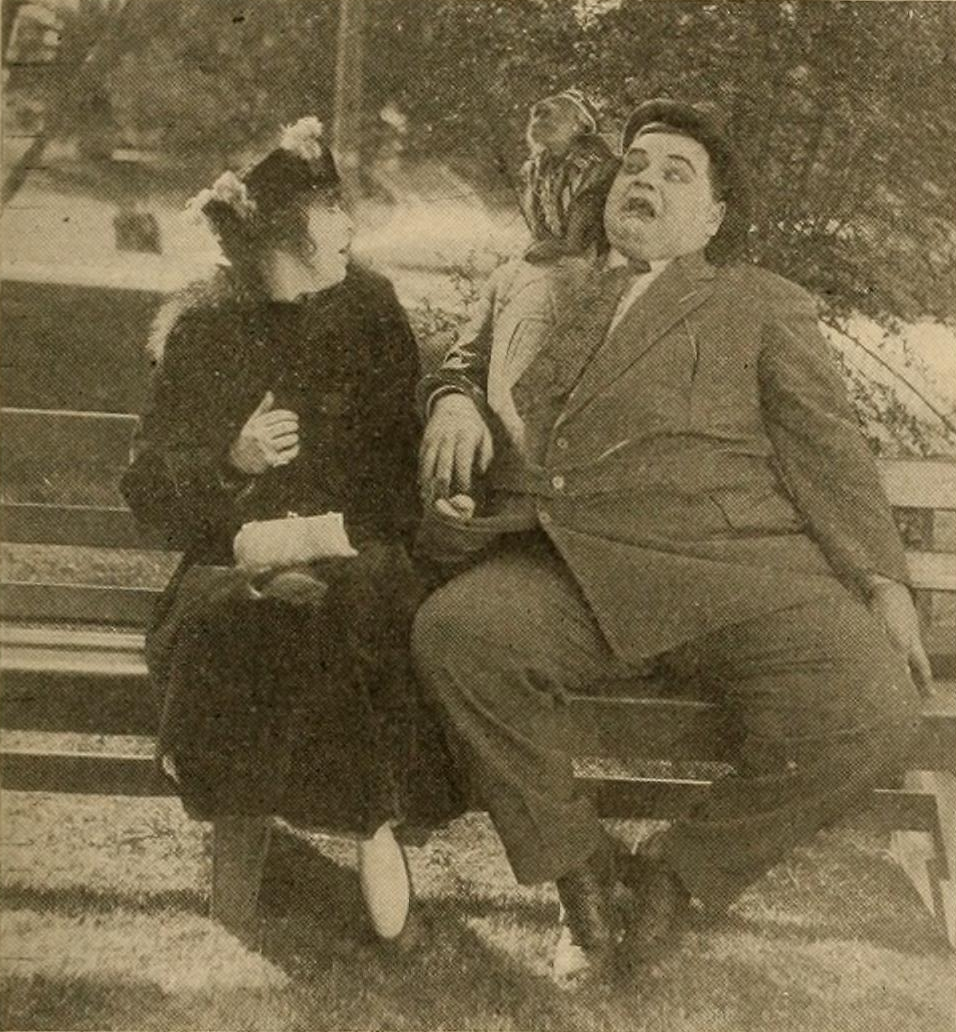
- Directed by: Fatty Arbuckle
- Produced by: Mack Sennett
- Starring: Fatty Arbuckle
- Distributed by: Mutual Film
- Release date: February 11, 1915
- Running time: 13 minutes
- Country: United States
- Languages: Silent; English intertitles

Mabel and Fatty's Married Life is a 1915 American silent comedy short film directed by and starring Fatty Arbuckle.

== Plot ==
While Fatty's out on business Mabel stays alone at home. She hears noises and thinks there is a burglar. She calls the Keystone Cops for help, but it turns out it was a small monkey belonging to an organ grinder. Fatty comes home and they laugh about what has happened.

== Cast ==
- Mabel Normand as Mabel
- Roscoe "Fatty" Arbuckle as Fatty, her husband
- Glen Cavender as Organ Grinder
- Al St. John as Cop
- Joe Bordeaux as Second Italian/Cop
- James Bryant as Crowd Control Cop
- Harry Ward as Desk Sergeant
- Mae Busch as Woman Wearing Black
- Alice Davenport as Woman (uncredited)
- Alice Howell as Woman (uncredited)
- Charles Lakin as Fatty's Business Associate (uncredited)

== See also ==
- Roscoe Arbuckle filmography
