= Great Mail Robbery =

1927 film

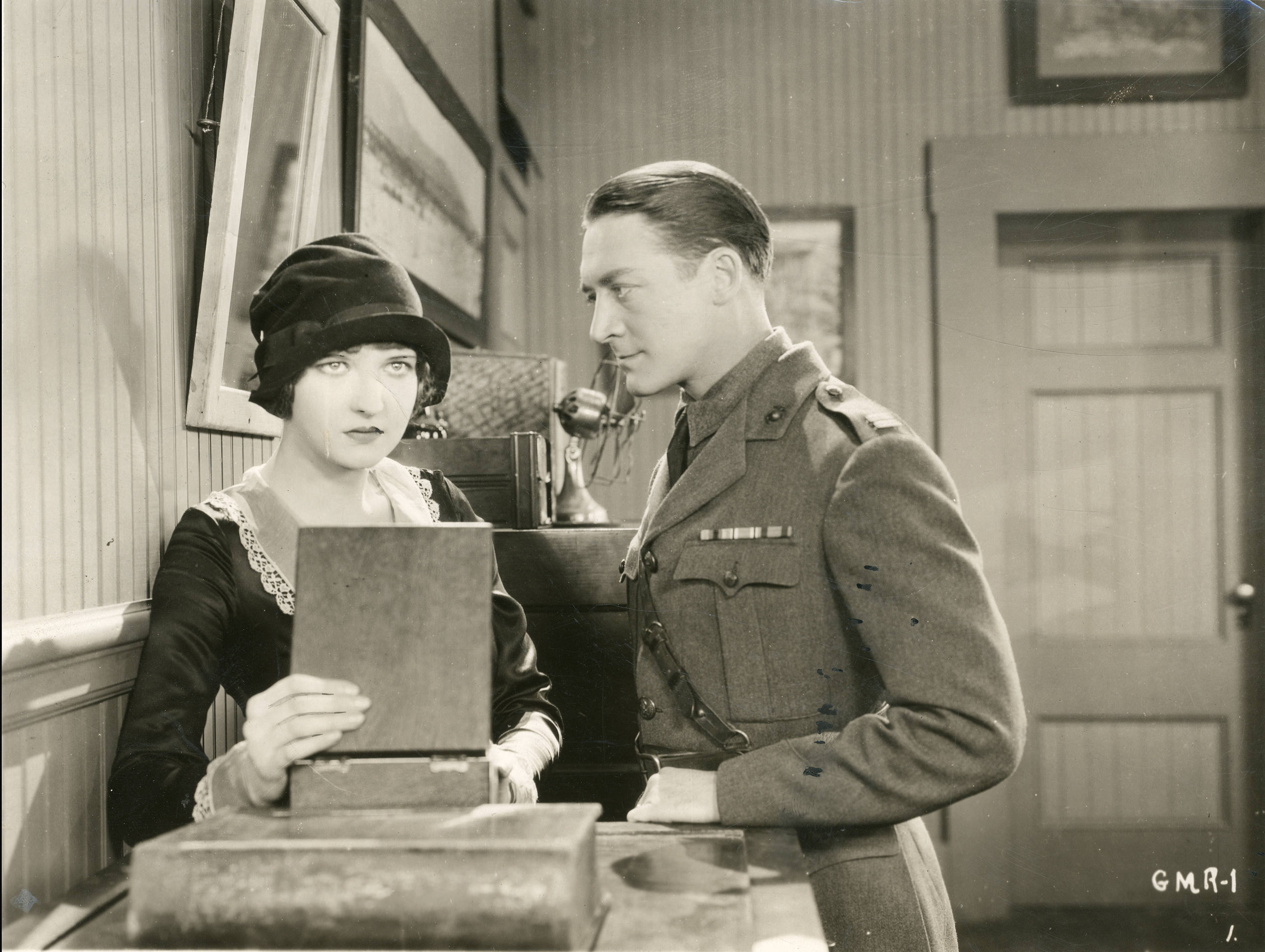
- Still with Jean Fenwick and Theodore von Eltz
- Directed by: George B. Seitz
- Written by: Peter Milne
- Starring: Theodore von Eltz
- Cinematography: Joseph Walker
- Production company: Film Booking Offices of America
- Distributed by: Robertson-Cole Pictures Corporation
- Release date: July 19, 1927
- Running time: 70 minutes
- Country: United States
- Language: Silent (English intertitles)

Great Mail Robbery is a 1927 American silent drama film directed by George B. Seitz.

== Cast ==
- Theodore von Eltz as Lieutenant Donald Macready
- Frank Nelson as Sergeant Bill Smith
- Jean Fenwick as Laura Phelps (credited as Jeanne Morgan)
- Lee Shumway as Philip Howard
- DeWitt Jennings as Captain Davis
- Cora Williams as Mrs. Davis
- Nelson McDowell as Sheriff
- Charles Hill Mailes as Stephen Phelps
- Yvonne Howell as Sally

== Preservation ==
An incomplete print of The Great Mail Robbery that is missing reel 6 is in the Library of Congress collection.
