= Murphy's I.O.U. =

1913 film

- Directed by: Mack Sennett
- Starring: Fatty Arbuckle
- Release date: April 12, 1913
- Country: United States
- Languages: Silent; English intertitles

Murphy's I.O.U. is a 1913 American short comedy film featuring Fatty Arbuckle.

== Cast ==
- Phyllis Allen
- Roscoe "Fatty" Arbuckle
- Nick Cogley
- Dot Farley
- Henry Lehrman
- Fred Mace as Murphy
- Hank Mann
- Charles Murray
- Mack Sennett as Policeman
- Ford Sterling
- Al St. John

== See also ==
- List of American films of 1913
- Fatty Arbuckle filmography
