= For the Love of Mabel =

1913 film

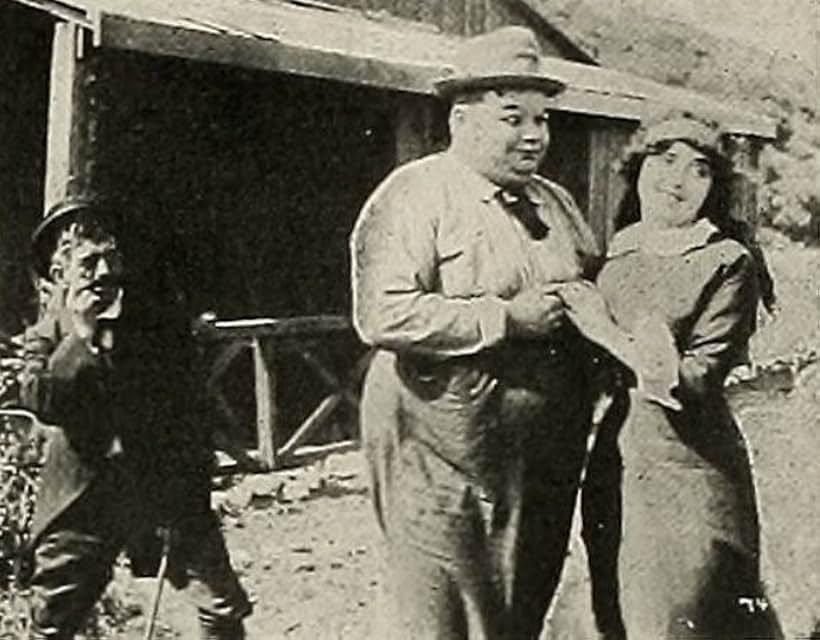
- Film still
- Directed by: Henry Lehrman
- Starring: Roscoe "Fatty" Arbuckle
- Release date: June 30, 1913
- Country: United States
- Languages: Silent; English intertitles

For the Love of Mabel is a 1913 American short comedy film featuring Roscoe "Fatty" Arbuckle and directed by Henry Lehrman.

== Cast ==
- Roscoe "Fatty" Arbuckle
- Mabel Normand
- Ford Sterling

== See also ==
- List of American films of 1913
- Fatty Arbuckle filmography
