= Yvonne Howell =

American film actress (1905–2010)

- Born: Julia Rose Shevlin; July 31, 1905; Chicago, Illinois, U.S.
- Died: May 27, 2010 (aged 104); Los Angeles, California, U.S.
- Occupation: American film actress
- Spouse: George Stevens (m. 1930; div. 1947)
- Children: George Stevens Jr.
- Mother: Alice Howell

Yvonne Howell (born Julia Rose Shevlin; July 31, 1905 – May 27, 2010) was an actress whose career began in silent films.

== Early life ==
Julia Rose Shevlin was born in Chicago. Her parents were vaudeville performer and silent actress Alice Howell and Benjamin Vincent Shevlin.

== Career ==
Howell made films during the silent era, including Fashions for Women (1927) directed by Dorothy Arzner, and Somewhere in Sonora (1927), a Western starring Ken Maynard. With the advent of sound pictures, she hoped that her distinctive "giggle" would get her roles, but she only appeared in one film after 1930, Working Girls (1931).

During World War II, Howell worked as a nurse's aide at Army hospitals in California.

== Personal life ==
In 1930, she became the first wife of then cameraman George Stevens, an Academy Award-winning film director. They divorced in 1947. Their son, George Stevens Jr., was founding director of the American Film Institute. Howell died at age 104 on May 27, 2010, from cardiac arrest, at her residence of Hollywood.

== Filmography ==
- Working Girls (1931)
- Take Me Home (1928)
- Hop Off (1928) Short
- Great Mail Robbery (1927)
- Somewhere in Sonora (1927)
- Fashions for Women (1927)
- The Lady of Lyons, N.Y. (1926) Short
- A Fraternity Mixup (1926) Short
- Flaming Flappers (1925) Short
- Transients in Arcadia (1925) Short
- Harem Follies (1924) Short
