= Take Me Home (1928 film) =

1928 film

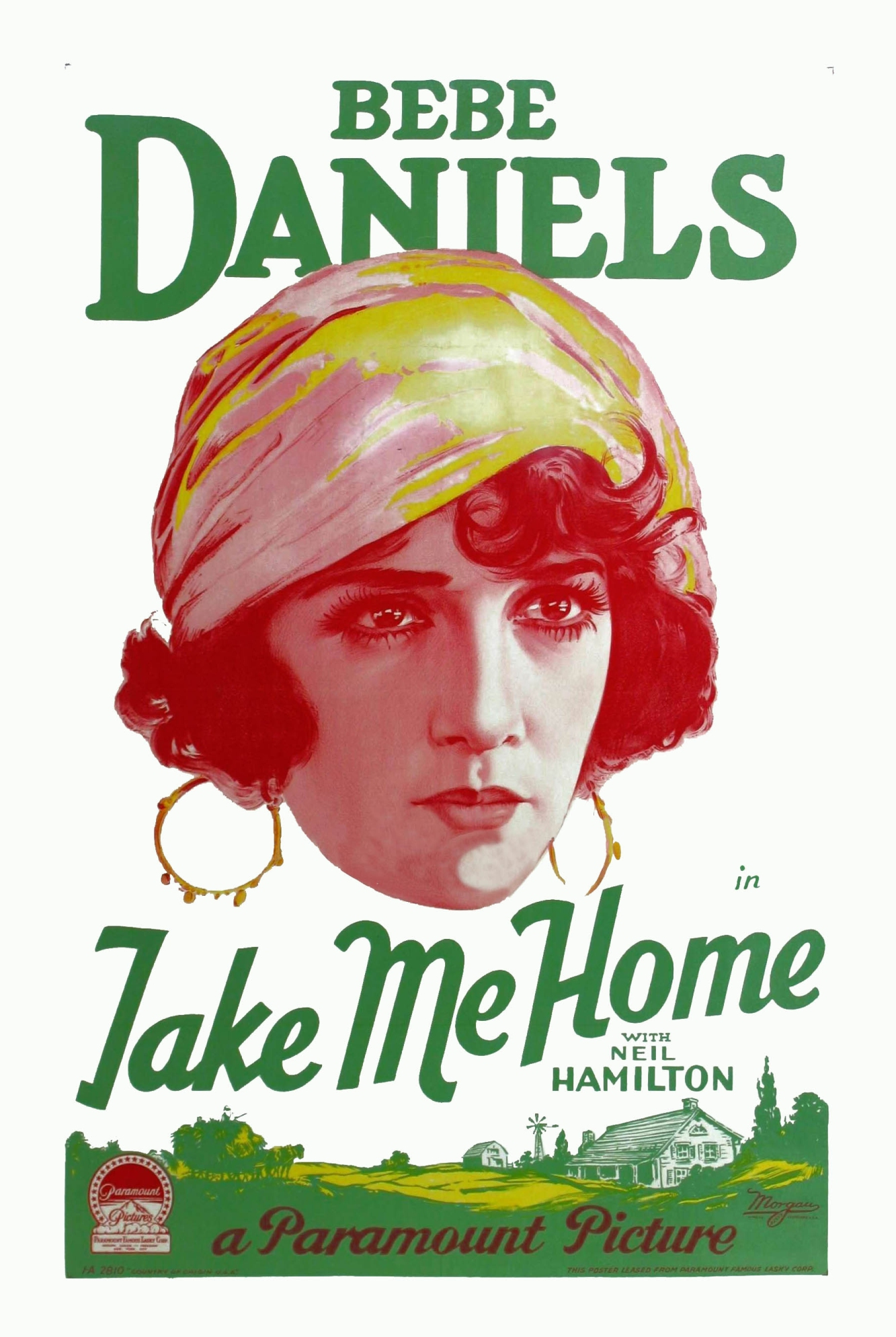
- Directed by: Marshall Neilan
- Written by: Grover Jones; Tom Crizer; Harlan Thompson; Ethel Doherty (scenario); Herman J. Mankiewicz (intertitles)
- Produced by: Adolph Zukor; Jesse L. Lasky
- Starring: Bebe Daniels; Neil Hamilton
- Cinematography: J. Roy Hunt
- Edited by: Otho Lovering
- Distributed by: Paramount Pictures
- Release date: October 13, 1928
- Running time: 6 reels (5,614 feet)
- Country: United States
- Languages: Silent Version; Sound Version (Synchronized) (English intertitles)

Take Me Home is a 1928 silent comedy produced by Famous Players–Lasky and distributed by Paramount Pictures. Due to the public apathy towards silent films, a sound version was also prepared. While the sound version has no audible dialog, it was released with a synchronized musical score with sound effects using both the sound-on-disc and sound-on-film process. The film was directed by Marshall Neilan and starred Bebe Daniels and Neil Hamilton.

== Plot ==
Peggy Lane joins David North's chorus but becomes jealous when she discovers that Delerys Devore, the show's star, is of interest to David more than her.

== Cast ==
- Bebe Daniels as Peggy Lane
- Neil Hamilton as David North
- Lilyan Tashman as Derelys Devore
- Doris Hill as Alice Moore
- Joe E. Brown as Bunny
- Ernie Wood as Al Marks
- Marcia Harris as The Landlady
- Yvonne Howell as Elsie
- Janet MacLeod as Betty
- J.W. Johnston as The Producer

== Music ==
The sound version of the film featured a theme song entitled "You Wanted Someone To Play With (I Wanted Someone to Love)”" which was composed by George McConnell, Nat Osbourne, Frank Capano and Margie Morris.

== Preservation status ==
The film is now considered a lost film.

== See also ==
- List of lost films
