= Help! Help! =

- Directed by: Mack Sennett
- Starring: Fred Mace; Mabel Normand
- Release date: 11 April 1912
- Running time: 8min

Help! Help! is a 1912 short American silent comedy film directed by Mack Sennett.

== Cast ==
- Fred Mace - Mr. Suburbanite
- Mabel Normand - Mrs. Suburbanite
- Dell Henderson - Office Worker
- Edward Dillon - Office Worker
- Alfred Paget - Burglar
- W. C. Robinson - Burglar
