= The Villain Foiled =

The Godfather
- Directed by: Henry Lehrman, Mack Sennett
- Starring: Edward Dillon; Blanche Sweet; Joseph Graybill; Kate Bruce
- Production company: Biograph Company
- Release date: August 31, 1911
- Running time: 5 minutes
- Country: United States
- Language: Silent (English intertitles)

The Villain Foiled is a 1911 American silent comedy short film directed by Henry Lehrman and Mack Sennett and starring Edward Dillon and Blanche Sweet. The film was a split reel along with the film The Baron. A print of The Villain Foiled exists.

== Plot ==
According to a film magazine, "An unsuccessful suitor gets his rival drunk so as to win the girl away from him. The intended victim's friends, however, thwart the villain's plans by making it appear that the girl's sweetheart had attempted suicide because of her coldness. This so impresses the girl that she consents to an immediate marriage to the young man by the minister they have called in."

== Cast ==
- Edward Dillon as Harry, the fiancé
- Blanche Sweet as Miss Page
- Joseph Graybill as Hector Durant, the villain
- Kate Bruce as Miss Page's mother
- William J. Butler as club valet
- Dell Henderson as Harry's 2nd friend
- Eddie Lyons as club member
- Fred Mace as Harry's 1st friend
- Vivian Prescott
