= Cupid in a Dental Parlor =

1913 film

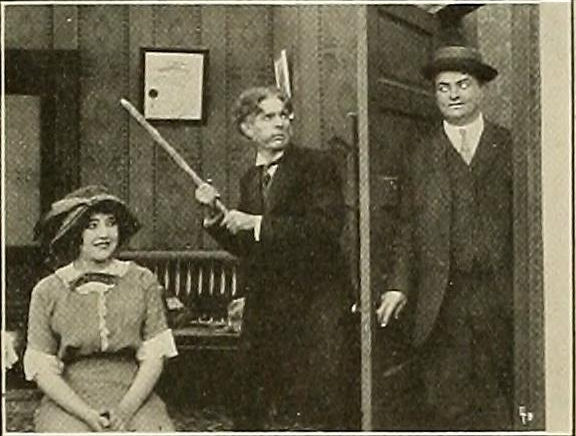
- Publicity still
- Directed by: Henry Lehrman
- Produced by: Mack Sennett
- Starring: Fred Mace
- Production company: Keystone Studios
- Distributed by: Mutual Film
- Release date: April 21, 1913
- Country: United States
- Languages: Silent; English intertitles

Cupid in a Dental Parlor (also known as Love in the Dental Parlor) is a 1913 American silent short comedy film directed by Henry Lehrman. Harold Lloyd is said to have appeared in this film, but this is unconfirmed.

== Plot ==
According to a film magazine, "Harold is in love with Ethel Parks, but finds scant favor with her father, Parks always manages to get his daughter away from her admirer, but one day Harold makes bold to call at the house. The reception he receives shows him plainly that he will never win the old man's favor. Harold goes to see his friend, the dentist. While there, Parks comes in, suffering with an aching tooth, accompanied by Ethel. Harold jams him into the chair and applies the gas, and soon Parks is in slumberland. Harold persuades the dentist to take Ethel to the minister's house and await him there. On the way the dentist, himself a suitor, convinces Ethel that she should marry him and the knot is tied. When Harold rushes up he is coldly met by the couple who inform him that they are married, and Harold vents his spleen on the little dentist."

== Cast ==
- Fred Mace
- Chester Conklin
- Josef Swickard
- Jewel Carmen (credited as Evelyn Quick)
- Harold Lloyd - (unconfirmed)

== See also ==
- List of American films of 1913
- Harold Lloyd filmography
