= Professor Bean's Removal =

1913 film

- Directed by: Henry Lehrman
- Starring: Fatty Arbuckle
- Release date: July 31, 1913
- Country: United States
- Languages: Silent; English intertitles

Professor Bean's Removal is a 1913 American short comedy film featuring Fatty Arbuckle.

== Cast ==
- Roscoe "Fatty" Arbuckle
- Charles Murray
- Mabel Normand
- Ford Sterling

== See also ==
- List of American films of 1913
- Fatty Arbuckle filmography
