= Lover's Luck =

1914 film

- Directed by: Fatty Arbuckle
- Starring: Fatty Arbuckle
- Release date: September 19, 1914
- Country: United States
- Language: Silent with English intertitles

Lover's Luck is a 1914 American short comedy film directed by and starring Fatty Arbuckle. The plot is summarized as "Minta's father favors St. John over her preferred lover Fatty, but Minta and Fatty get a lucky break when they are locked in a closet with the preacher."

== Cast ==
- Roscoe "Fatty" Arbuckle as Fatty
- Minta Durfee as The Girl
- Al St. John as Fatty's Rival
- Josef Swickard as The Girl's Father
- Phyllis Allen as The Girl's Mother
- Frank Hayes as Justice of the Peace
- Slim Summerville as A Villager
- Alice Howell as Leader of Snoopy Neighbors
- Luke the Dog uncredited

== See also ==
- List of American films of 1914
- Fatty Arbuckle filmography
