= Mabel's Adventures =

- Directed by: Mack Sennett
- Produced by: Mack Sennett
- Starring: Mabel Normand; Fred Mace; Ford Sterling
- Distributed by: Mutual Film
- Release date: December 16, 1912 (United States)
- Country: United States
- Languages: Silent; English intertitles

The film

Mabel's Adventures is a 1912 American short silent comedy film starring Mabel Normand and produced and directed by Mack Sennett for the Mutual Film Corporation.

== Cast ==
- Mabel Normand as Mabel
- Fred Mace as The Burlesque Queen
- Ford Sterling as The Magician
