= Why He Gave Up =

- Directed by: Henry Lehrman; Mack Sennett
- Written by: Elmer Booth
- Story by: George Hennessey
- Produced by: Mack Sennett
- Starring: Fred Mace; Mabel Normand
- Cinematography: Percy Higginson
- Distributed by: General Film Company
- Release date: December 4, 1911 (United States)
- Running time: 12 minutes
- Country: United States
- Languages: Silent; English intertitles

Why He Gave Up is a 1911 American short silent comedy film starring Fred Mace and Mabel Normand. The film was co-directed by Mack Sennett and Henry Lehrman and shot in Huntington, Long Island.

== Cast ==
- Fred Mace as The Husband
- Mabel Normand as The Wife
- Edward Dillon as One of the Husband's Chums
- William J. Butler as One of the Husband's Chums
- Kathleen Butler as At Club
- William Beaudine as At Club
- W.C. Robinson as Cafe Employee / At Club
- J. Waltham as At Club
