= Laughing Gas (1914 film) =

1914 film by Charlie Chaplin

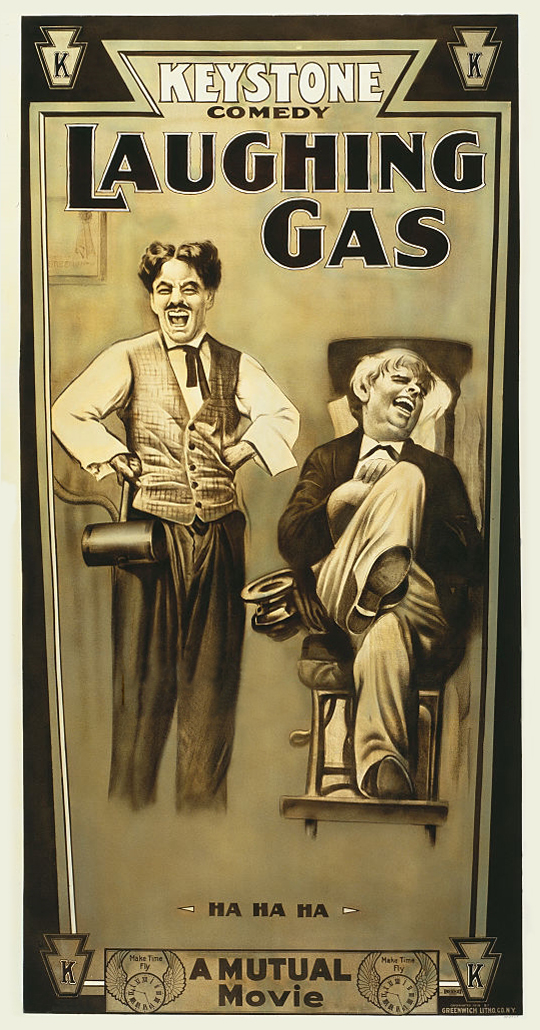
- Directed by: Charlie Chaplin
- Produced by: Mack Sennett
- Starring: Charlie Chaplin
- Cinematography: Frank D. Williams
- Edited by: Charles Chaplin
- Production company: Keystone Studios
- Distributed by: Mutual Film
- Release date: July 9, 1914
- Running time: 16 minutes
- Country: United States
- Languages: Silent film English intertitles

Laughing Gas

Laughing Gas is a 1914 film starring Charlie Chaplin. The film is also known as Busy Little Dentist, Down and Out, Laffing Gas, The Dentist, and Tuning His Ivories. It is inspired by the 1907 film with the same name.

== Plot ==
We are told Charlie is a dental assistant working at Dr. Pain's dental office. He arrives at work where the patients are already waiting. He joins the tiny second dental assistant in the back room. They have a brief squabble then Charlie goes to the waiting room to clean the floor with a carpet sweeper. He bumps into a patient and a squabble starts. The second dental assistant trips over the carpet sweeper and another squabble starts in the back room.

The dentist arrives, and his first patient goes in, obviously in pain. The dentist prepares the nitrous oxide anaesthetic (also known commonly as "laughing gas" due to its effects prior to and after unconsciousness). With the man unconscious he pulls his tooth, but then he can't get him to wake up, so he calls for Charlie and runs off when the latter arrives. Charlie tries to wake him and eventually tries hitting his head with a mallet. The man revives but starts laughing. Charlie knocks him out with the mallet.

The dentist then returns and Charlie is sent to the drug store to get a prescription for the unconscious man. After more fighting with the patients, he goes to the Sunset Pharmacy. He accidentally hits with his cane a man who is standing at a news-stand outside the pharmacy, and the two have a squabble. When Charlie leaves the pharmacy he kicks the man in the rear, and another squabble starts. The squabble is interrupted when they encounter a woman (the dentist's wife) and Charlie kicks him in the stomach before chasing the woman himself. However, Charlie accidentally pulls off her skirt, causing her to run off in embarrassment. He continues fighting with the news-stand man, who receives a brick in the face and thus loses his teeth. Charlie then throws a second brick, which hits a tall passer-by and losing him teeth as well.

Meanwhile, the dentist's wife goes home and his maid sees her without her skirt, so she calls the dentist to say that his wife has had an "accident". He immediately goes home and Charlie returns to find the surgery empty. He picks the prettier of the two female patients in the waiting room to go in, causing the other lady to leave in indignance. Charlie flirts with her and steals kisses. Meanwhile, the two men injured by Charlie arrive to see the dentist, and the dentist and his wife return to the office. The girl leaves and Charlie has the tall passerby go in next, while the news-stand man recognizes Charlie as the man who has knocked his teeth out. Charlie uses a huge pair of pliers to remove another tooth from the tall man. The news-stand man enters and confronts Charlie. A final fight ensues.

== Cast ==
- Charlie Chaplin - Dentist's Assistant
- Fritz Schade - Dr. Pain, the Dentist
- Alice Howell - Mrs. Pain, the Dentist's Wife
- Joseph Sutherland - Short Assistant
- Slim Summerville - Patient
- Josef Swickard - Patient
- Mack Swain - Patient
- Frank Opperman – Patient
- Gene Marsh - Patient (uncredited)

== Reviews ==
A reviewer from Motion Picture News wrote, "Besides getting into a fight with two of his master's patients and getting generally in the way, [Chaplin] doesn't do anything except create roars of laughter."

== See also ==
- List of American films of 1914
