= Laughing Gas (film) =

Laughing Gas may refer to the following films:

- Laughing Gas (1914 film)
- Laughing Gas (1931 film)
