= Fred Mace =

American actor

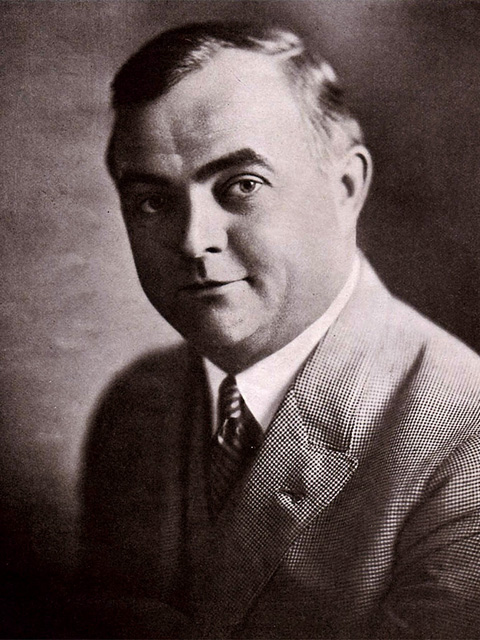
- Mace in 1915
- Born: August 22, 1878; Philadelphia, Pennsylvania, US
- Died: February 21, 1917 (aged 38); New York City, New York, US
- Occupation: Actor
- Years active: 1909–1916

Fred Mace (August 22, 1878 – February 21, 1917) was a comedic actor during the silent era in the United States. He appeared in more than 150 films between 1909 and 1916. Mace worked for Mack Sennett at Keystone Studios. Shortly after he left, Roscoe Arbuckle, who had appeared in a few pictures at Keystone with Mace, took over as Sennett's lead comedic actor.

Before Mace began working in films he acted on stage. Broadway productions in which he appeared included A Chinese Honeymoon (1904) and Piff! Paff!! Pouf!!! (1904). He left the stage in 1909 to begin making films.

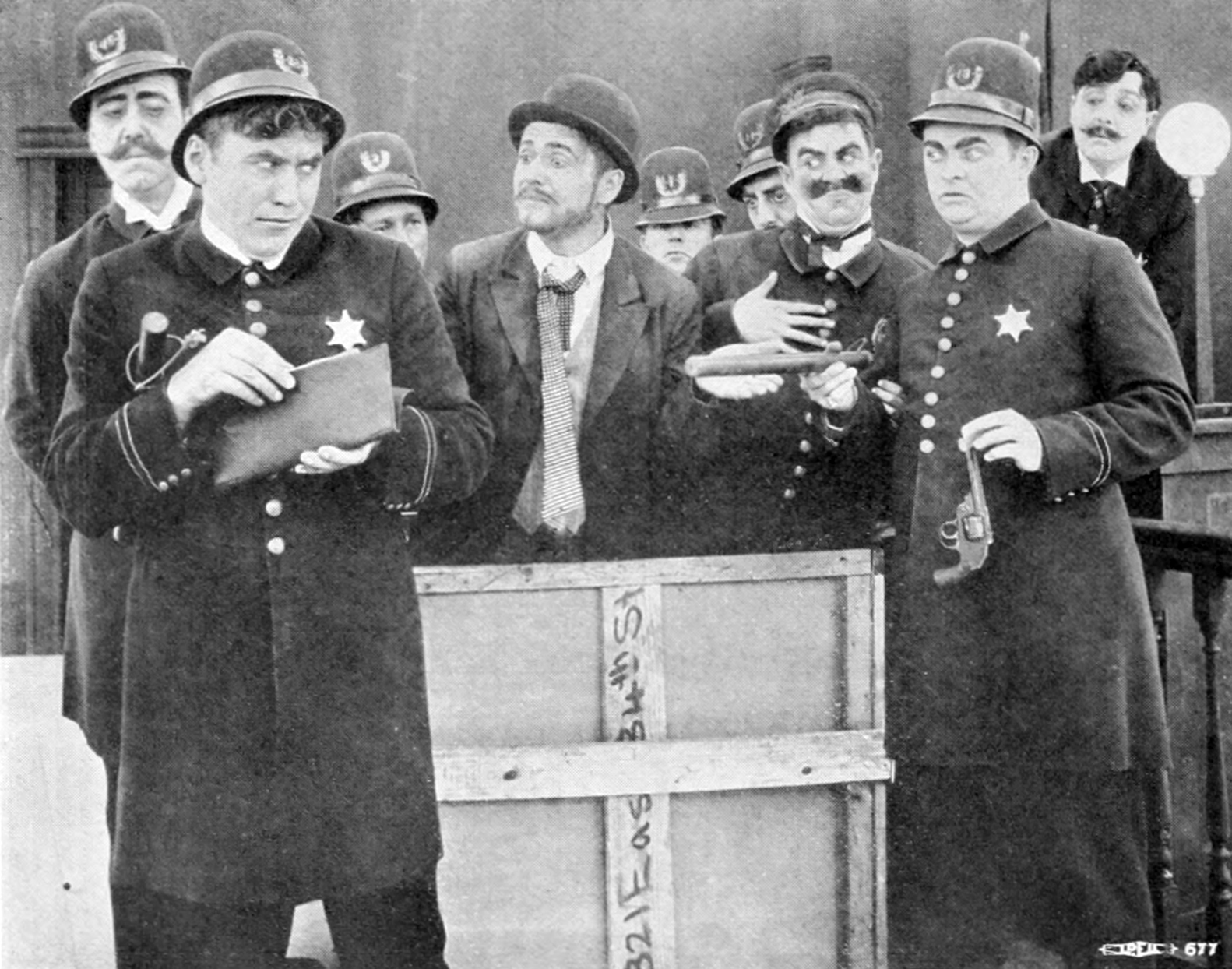
Photograph of Keystone Cops from 1912 with Fred Mace second from right

Mace was born in Philadelphia, Pennsylvania, and died of apoplexy on February 21, 1917, at the Hotel Astor in New York City. He was buried in a family plot in Morristown, New Jersey.

All of his work is in the public domain.

== Selected filmography ==
- The Lucky Toothache (1910)
- The Villain Foiled (1911)
- Her Awakening (1911)
- Why He Gave Up (1911)
- At It Again (1912)
- A Voice from the Deep (1912)
- The Speed Demon (1912)
- The Water Nymph (1912)
- The Flirting Husband (1912)
- Mabel's Lovers (1912)
- Mabel's Adventures (1912)
- A Dash Through the Clouds (1912)
- Help! Help! (1912)
- A Game of Pool (1913)
- Murphy's I.O.U. (1913)
- Cupid in a Dental Parlor (1913)
- The Bangville Police (1913)
- The Foreman of the Jury (1913)
- The Gangsters (1913)
- When Dreams Come True (1913)
- Mabel at the Wheel (1914)
- My Valet (1915)
- Fatty and the Broadway Stars (1915)
