= Mabel's Lovers =

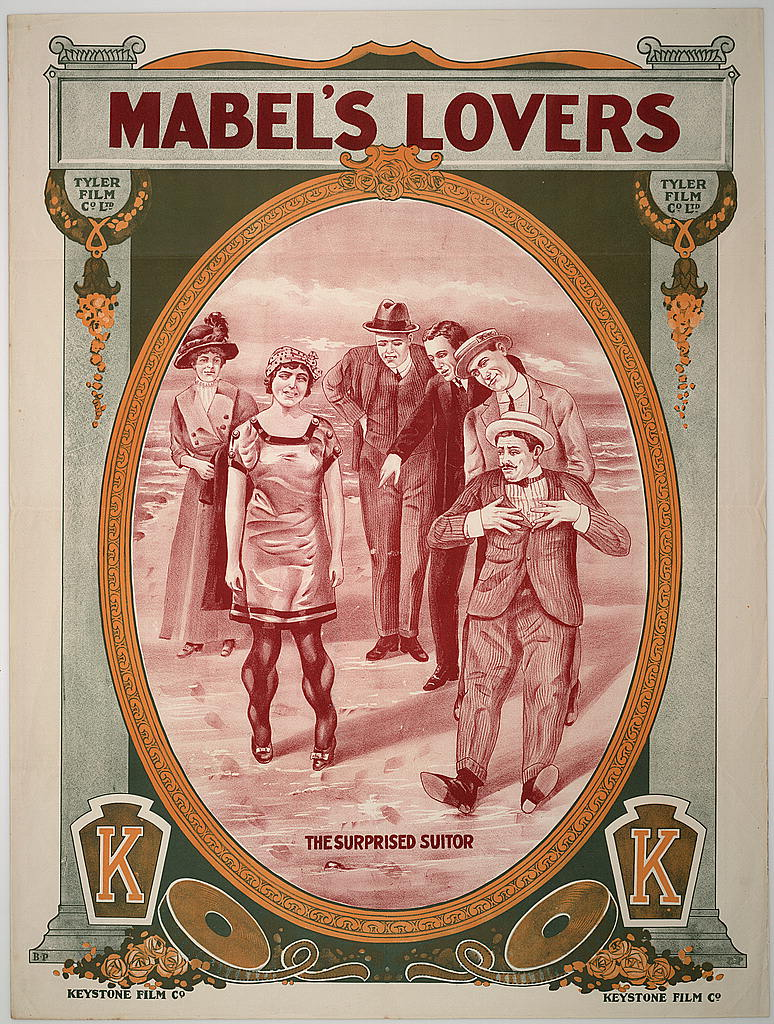
- Theatrical release poster
- Directed by: Mack Sennett
- Produced by: Mack Sennett
- Starring: Mabel Normand; Fred Mace; Ford Sterling; Alice Davenport
- Distributed by: Mutual Film
- Release date: November 12, 1912 (United States)
- Country: United States
- Languages: Silent film English intertitles

Mabel's Lovers is a 1912 American short silent comedy film starring Mabel Normand. The film was directed and produced by Mack Sennett.

== Cast ==
- Mabel Normand as Mabel
- Fred Mace as Mabel's suitor
- Ford Sterling as Black - Another Suitor
- Alice Davenport as Mabel's Mother
