= Street Corner (1929 film) =

1929 film

- Directed by: Russell Birdwell
- Starring: Josef Swickard; Henry B. Walthall
- Release date: September 16, 1929
- Country: United States
- Language: English

Street Corner is a 1929 black-and-white short film directed by Russell Birdwell and starring Josef Swickard and Henry B. Walthall.
