= When Dreams Come True (1913 film) =

1913 film

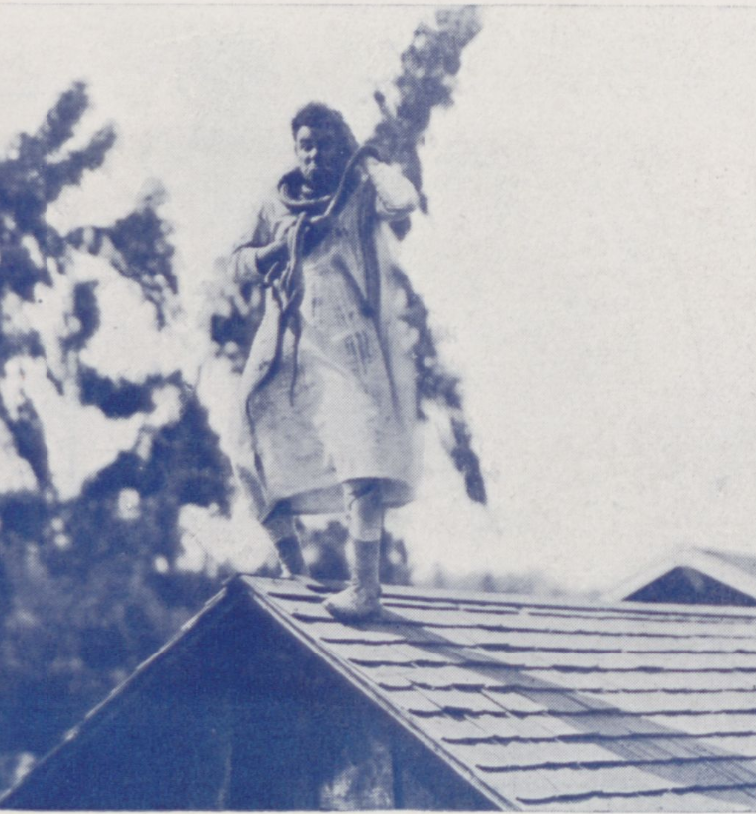
- Directed by: Mack Sennett
- Starring: Fatty Arbuckle
- Production company: Keystone Studios
- Distributed by: Mutual Film
- Release date: September 22, 1913
- Running time: 1 reel
- Country: United States
- Languages: Silent; English intertitles

When Dreams Come True is a 1913 American silent short comedy film featuring Fatty Arbuckle.

== Plot ==
According to a trade publication, "The Man insists upon going off on his bi-monthly bat, in spite of his wife's remonstrations. In the saloon where be acquires his agreeable sensations he meets a snake-charmer — who leaves his suitcase full of snakes, outside, against the other one belonging to the man. Bimeby, Mr. Man goes home, nicely lighted up and is put to bed by his faithful wife — who presently brings in his suit-case and slams it on the bureau with such impatience that the cover bursts open. She is scarcely out of the room when the snakes begin to emerge and scatter — real live snakes of the diamond-back Rattler species. The partly-sobered man finds one between his knees on the bed — gently swaying toward his face. Another hangs from the chandelier with a gas-globe at the end of its tail. The whole room is alive with them. The wife comes in — nearly faints — rushes out for help. Fatty responds — takes one look — falls out of the door on the rebound. Two Policemen come running in with drawn revolvers — and go out with a squirming rattlesnake coiled about each gasping neck. The husband, in his nightshirt — now crazed with physical repulsion — runs from the house and down the road with a mass of writhing Rattlers around his neck. Runs up the steep-pitched roof of a barn — and jumps off. Tears along the road — into a spooning country-couple, locked in each other's arms — scares them speechless. Runs out upon a bridge — leaps from the rail into the river — and finds Br'er Snake amiably swimming toward him in the water. Then his wife appears running out on the bridge— jumps in after him— grabs his hair and keeps him afloat until the Police rescue them."

== Cast ==
- Roscoe "Fatty" Arbuckle
- Fred Mace
- Mabel Normand
- Ford Sterling
- Hank Mann
- Charles Inslee

== See also ==
- List of American films of 1913
