= Henry Lehrman =

American actor, screenwriter and director (1881–1946)

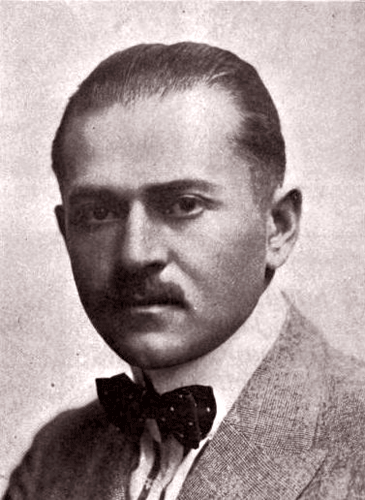
- Lehrman in 1914
- Born: 30 March 1881; Sambir, Austria-Hungary
- Died: 7 November 1946 (aged 65); Hollywood, Los Angeles, U.S.
- Resting place: Hollywood Forever Cemetery
- Other name: "Pathe" Lehrman
- Occupations: Actor, director, screenwriter
- Years active: 1909–1931
- Spouse: Jocelyn Leigh (m. 1922; div. 1924)
- Partner: Virginia Rappe (1919–1921)

Henry Lehrman (30 March 1881 – 7 November 1946) was an American actor, screenwriter, director and producer. Lehrman was a very prominent figure of Hollywood's silent film era, working with such cinematic pioneers as D. W. Griffith and Mack Sennett. He directed, as well as co-starred in, Charlie Chaplin's first film, Making a Living.

Lehrman was notoriously careless of the safety of the actors who worked for him. He was the fiancé of the actress Virginia Rappe, for whose death Roscoe "Fatty" Arbuckle (whom Lehrman had directed in about a dozen films in the early 1920s), in a highly publicized series of trials, was accused, and later acquitted, of manslaughter.

== Life and career ==
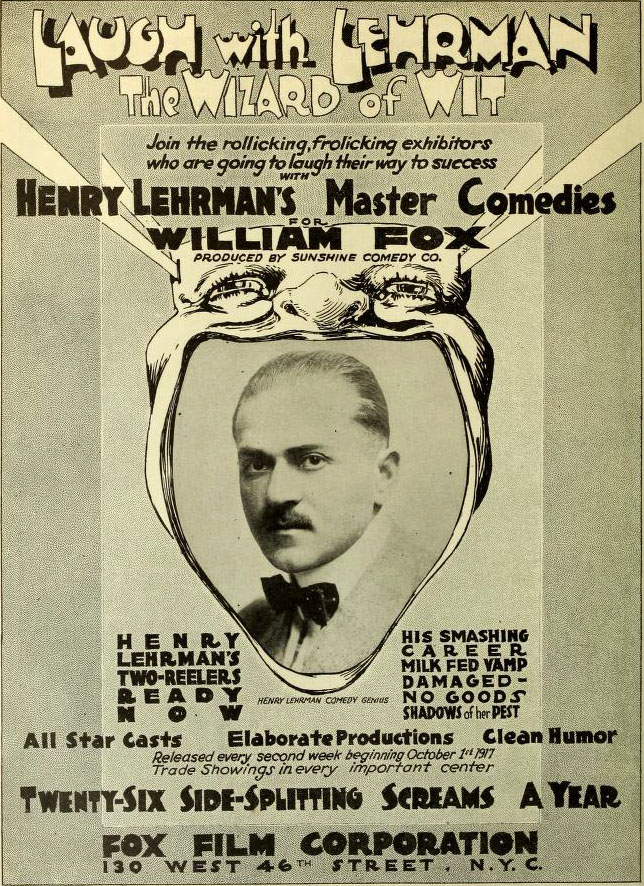
Advertisement, 1917

Born in Sambir, Austria-Hungary (now Ukraine) or Vienna, to Jewish parentage, Lehrman emigrated to the United States in 1908 or December 1906 and although he is best remembered as a film director, he began his career as an actor in a 1909 Biograph Studios production directed by D. W. Griffith. He gained the nickname "Pathé", reportedly because he told an executive at Biograph he had been sent there from Europe by France's Pathé Frères to get a job. While the executive may not have believed him, Biograph gave him his first acting work in film, appearing as one of many in a mob scene with another aspiring actor named Mack Sennett. A few years later Lehrman was a successful actor, and made his directorial debut, co-directing a 1911 Biograph production with Sennett. When Sennett left to found Keystone Studios, Henry Lehrman joined him, working as an actor, a screenwriter, and as the first director of Charlie Chaplin.

In February 1914, Lehrman and Ford Sterling left Keystone Studios, and established Sterling Comedies at Universal Studios. Sterling Comedies folded a year later.

Charles Chaplin and Lehrman, 1914

In 1915, following the demise of Sterling Comedies, Lehrman established his own film company called the L-KO Kompany to make two-reel comedies for Universal Studios. He was notorious for his low regard for actors, such as for Charlie Chaplin in the actor's earliest films, and his willingness to place his actors in dangerous situations earned him the nickname "Mr. Suicide". Author Kalton C. Lahue noted that bit players and extras actually refused calls from L-KO.

In 1916, Lehrman gave up acting to devote himself fully to directing and producing. He left the L-KO Kompany the following year and moved to Fox Film Corporation as producer of its "Sunshine Comedies" unit. In 1919, he met a young actress named Virginia Rappe and a personal relationship ensued that resulted in their engagement. However, in September 1921, Rappe, 30, died after attending a private party hosted by Roscoe 'Fatty' Arbuckle at a hotel in San Francisco. Arbuckle was accused of raping her and was charged with her murder; Lehrman used the trial for his own personal publicity. Eventually Arbuckle was found not guilty.

For the two years following his fiancée's death, Lehrman was virtually inactive in the film business. He went through a short-lived marriage in 1922 to Jocelyn Leigh. In 1924 he accepted an offer from Fox Film Corporation to return to directing its "Sunshine Comedies" unit. Lehrman continued as a successful director until the introduction of talkies at the end of the 1920s. He directed two sound films for Fox in 1929, one a short comedy, the other a feature-length production titled New Year's Eve starring Mary Astor. The films demonstrated Lehrman's difficulty adapting to directing with sound, and he was dropped by Fox. Two years later he made his final attempt at sound films, writing and directing a comedy short for Universal Studios.

Lehrman died of a stroke at his home in Hollywood on 8 November 1946. He was interred in the Hollywood Memorial Park Cemetery next to Virginia Rappe. He was 65.

== Partial directing filmography ==
Short film Almost a Scandal (1915) produced and directed by Lehrman.

- The Poor Millionaire (1930)
- New Year's Eve (1929)
- Homesick (1929)
- Chicken a La King (1928)
- Why Sailors Go Wrong (1928)
- Husbands for Rent (1927)
- For Ladies Only (1927)
- Sailor Izzy Murphy (1927)
- The Fighting Edge (1926)
- On Time (1924)
- Reported Missing (1922)
- Twixt Love and Fire (1914)
- Between Showers (1914)
- Kid Auto Races at Venice (1914)
- Making a Living (1914)
- The Woman Haters (1913)
- Two Old Tars (1913)
- Mother's Boy (1913)
- Professor Bean's Removal (1913)
- For the Love of Mabel (1913)
- Help! Help! Hydrophobia! (1913)
- Passions, He Had Three (1913)
- The Gangsters (1913)
- The Bangville Police (1913)
- Cupid in a Dental Parlor (1913)
- Murphy's I.O.U. (1913)
- Why He Gave Up (1911)
- The Villain Foiled (1911)
- A Mohawk's Way (1910) as Patient
