= The Bangville Police =

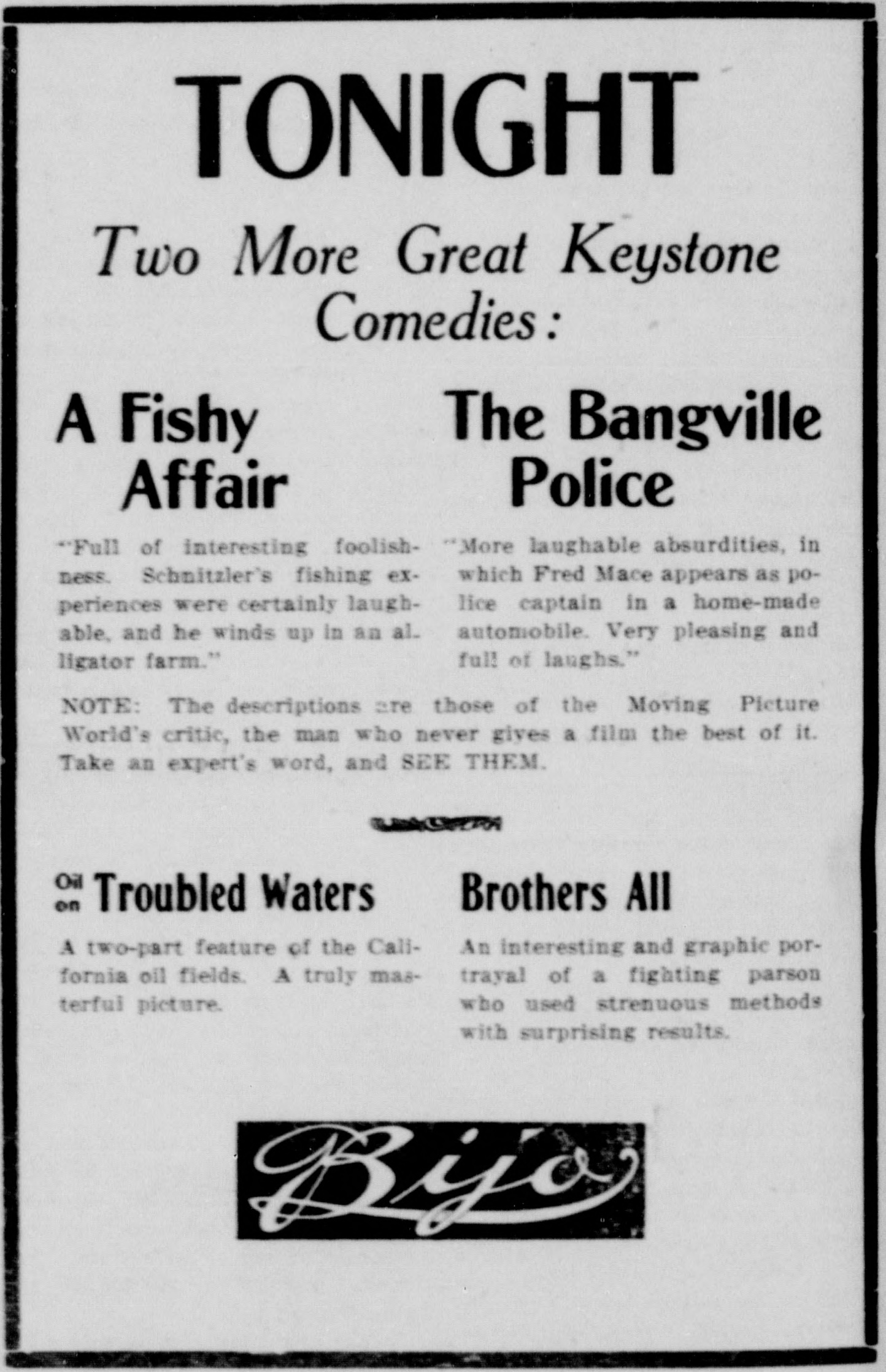
- Advertisement for the film and a few others.
- Directed by: Henry Lehrman
- Produced by: Mack Sennett
- Starring: Fred Mace; Mabel Normand; The Keystone Cops
- Distributed by: Mutual Film
- Release date: April 24, 1913 (U.S.)
- Running time: 8 minutes
- Country: United States
- Languages: Silent; English intertitles

The Bangville Police (1913)

The Bangville Police (also known as Bangville Police) is a 1913 American silent comedy short film starring Fred Mace, Mabel Normand and the Keystone Cops. The one-reel film, generally regarded as the seminal Keystone Cops short, was directed by Henry Lehrman.

== Plot ==
A farmer and his daughter are in the barn. She is saying she wishes the cow would have a calf. Left alone in the house she hears strangers in the barn and calls the police. She barricades herself in. Her parents return and have to break the door down. She thinks it is the robbers. Meanwhile, a smoky car brings the police. After misunderstandings are resolved they find a new-born calf in the barn.

== Cast ==
- Fred Mace as Sheriff of Bangville
- Mabel Normand as Della, Farmer's Daughter
- Nick Cogley as Her Farmer Father
- Dot Farley as Her Mother
- Charles Avery as First Deputy
- Rube Miller as Deputy in Straw Hat
- Edgar Kennedy as Deputy with Shovel
- Jack E. Leonard as Deputy
- Fred Happ as Deputy
- Raymond Hatton as Farm Hand
