= Keystone Cops =

Group of fictional characters

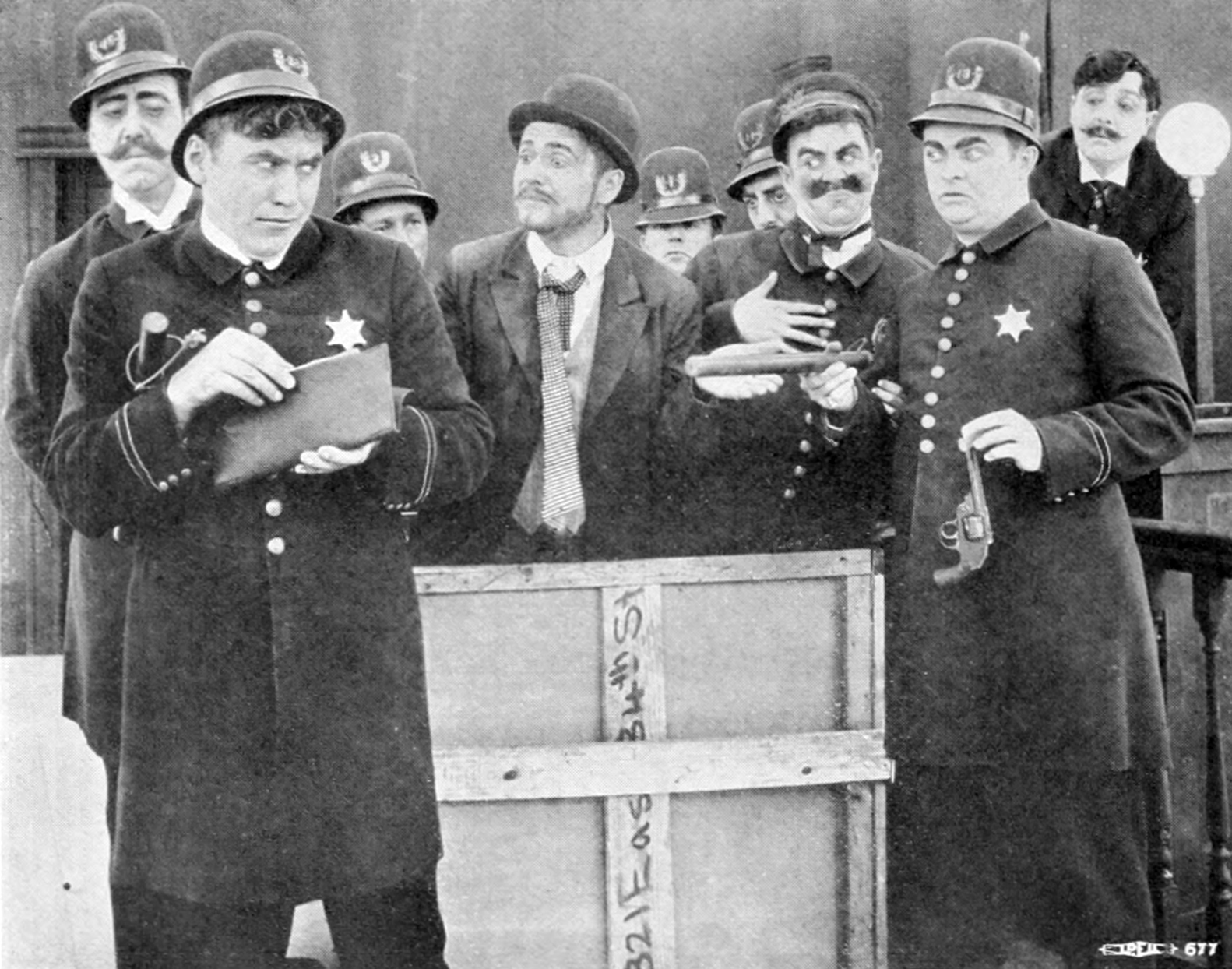
- The Keystone Cops in The Stolen Purse (1913). Pictured (left to right): Robert Z. Leonard, Mack Sennett, Bill Haber, Henry Lehrman, ⸻ McAlley, Chester Franklin, Ford Sterling, Fred Mace, and Arthur Tavares
- Created by: Mack Sennett
- Owner: Mack Sennett

The Keystone Cops (often spelled "Keystone Kops") are fictional, humorously incompetent policemen featured in silent film slapstick comedies produced by Mack Sennett for his Keystone Film Company between 1912 and 1917.

== History ==
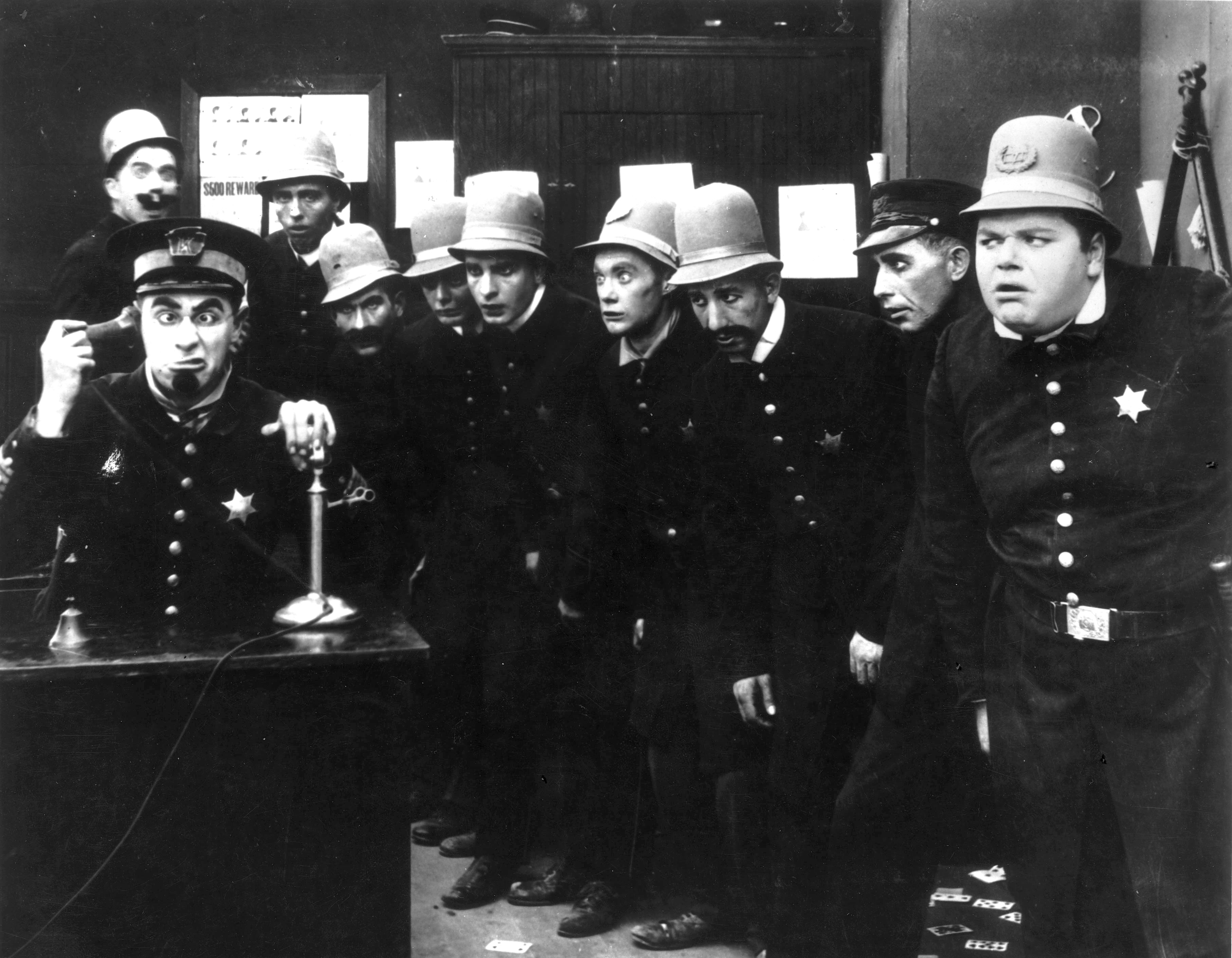
The Keystone Cops in a typical pose from In the Clutches of the Gang (1914). The chief (using the telephone) is Ford Sterling. The policeman directly behind Sterling (extreme background, left) is Edgar Kennedy. The young cop to Kennedy's left is a then-unknown William Frawley. The hefty policeman at extreme right is Fatty Arbuckle. The young constable with bulging eyes (fourth from right) is Arbuckle's nephew Al St. John. The casting of the Keystone police force changed from one film to the next; many of the members were per diem actors who remain unidentifiable.

Hank Mann created the Keystone Cops, and they were named after the Keystone studio, the film production company founded in 1912 by Max Sennett. Their first film was Hoffmeyer's Legacy (1912), with Mann playing the part of police chief Tehiezel, but their popularity stemmed from the 1913 short The Bangville Police starring Mabel Normand.

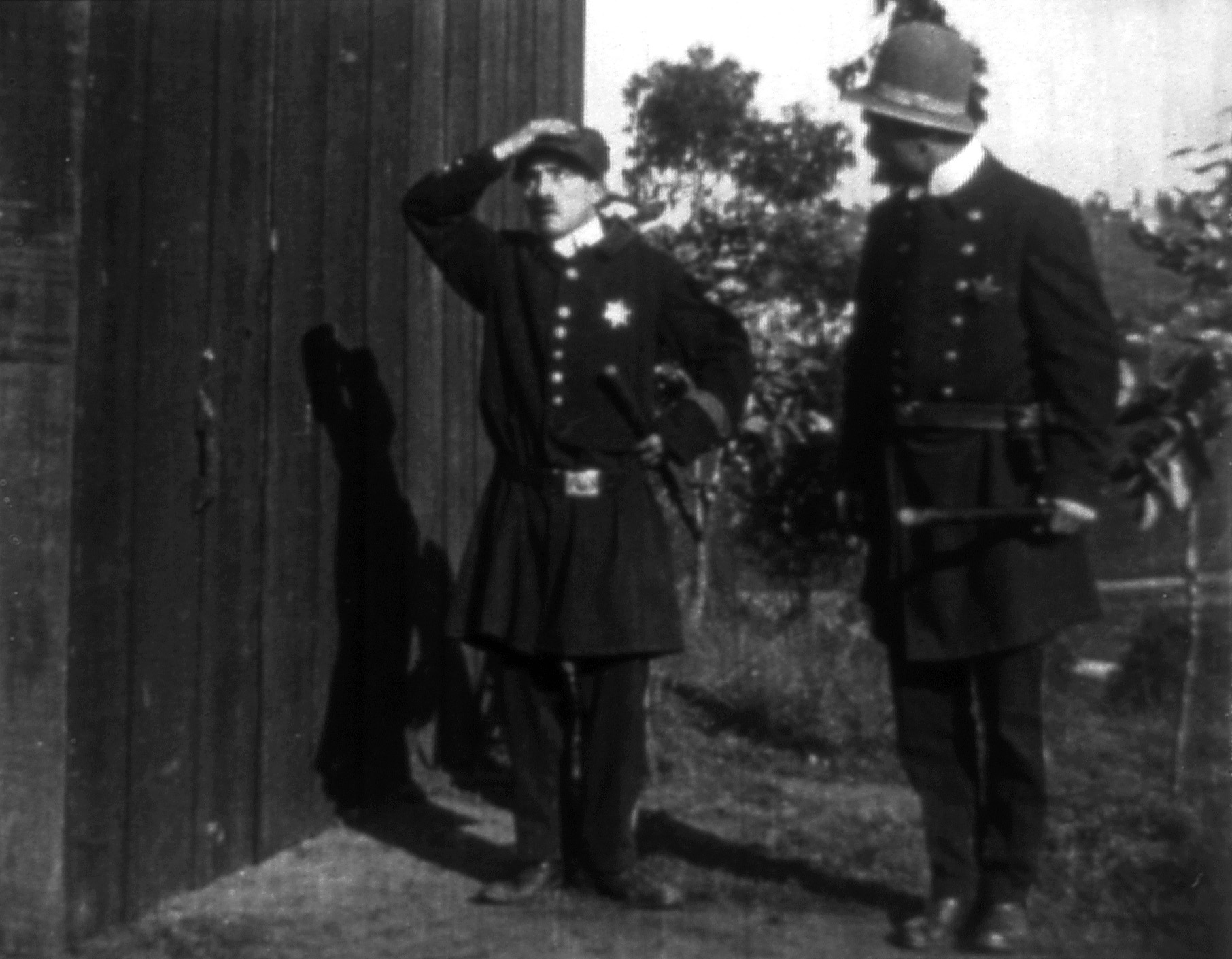
The Thief Catcher (1914) with Charlie Chaplin (left) as a Keystone Cop

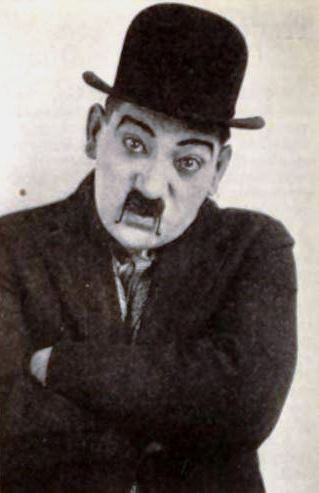
Heinie Conklin

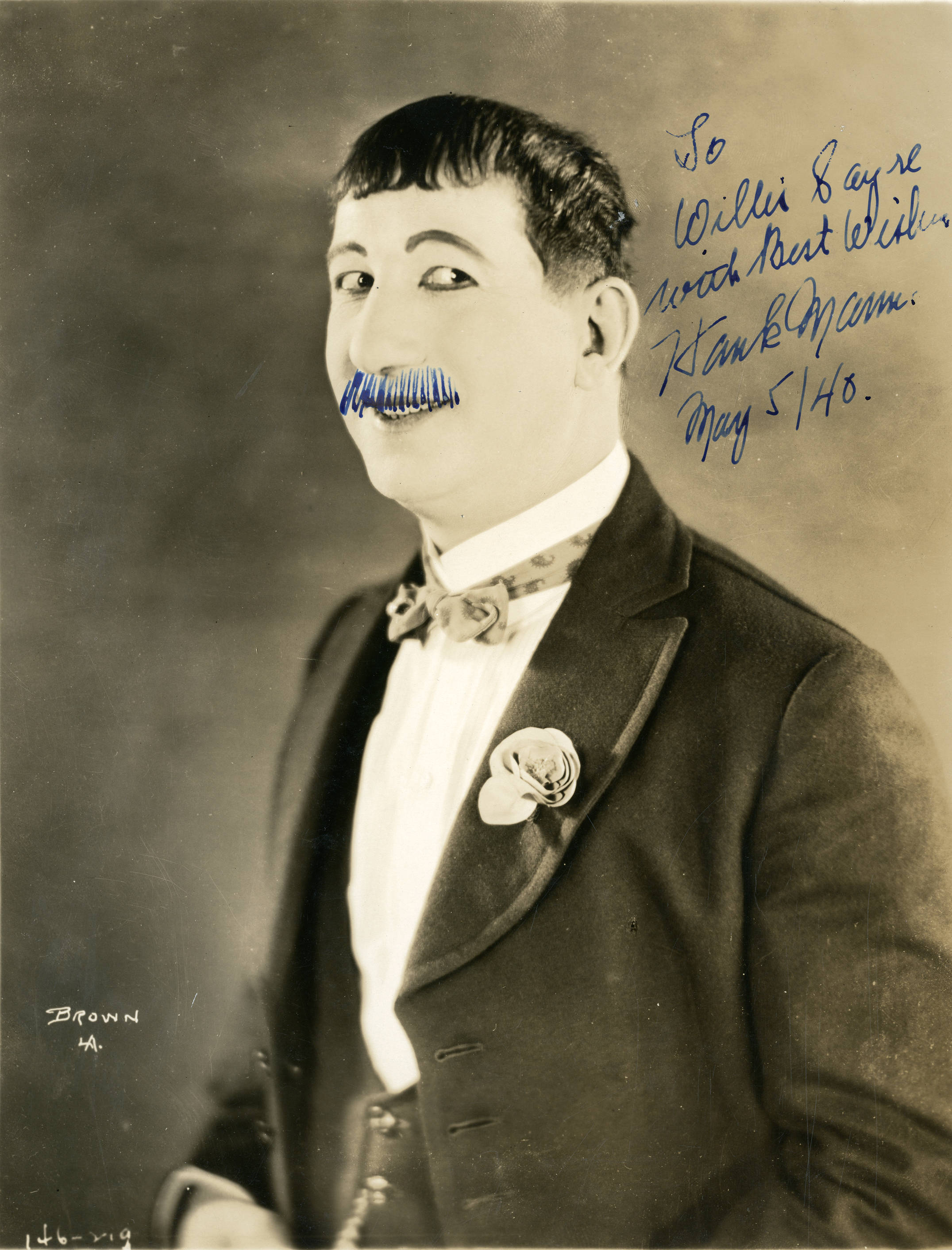
Hank Mann

As early as 1914, Sennett shifted the Keystone Cops from starring roles to background ensemble in support of comedians such as Charlie Chaplin and Fatty Arbuckle.

The Keystone Cops served as supporting players for Marie Dressler and Mabel Normand in the first full-length Sennett comedy feature Tillie's Punctured Romance (1914); Mabel's New Hero (1913) with Normand and Arbuckle; Making a Living (1914) with Chaplin in his first pre-Tramp screen appearance; In the Clutches of the Gang (1914) with Normand, Arbuckle, and Al St. John; and Wished on Mabel (1915) with Arbuckle and Normand, among others.

Comic actors Chester Conklin, Jimmy Finlayson, and Ford Sterling were also Keystone Cops, as was director Del Lord.

The original Keystone Cops were George Jeske, Bobby Dunn, Mack Riley, Charles Avery, Slim Summerville, Edgar Kennedy, and Hank Mann. In 2010, the lost short A Thief Catcher was discovered at an antique sale in Michigan. It was filmed in 1914 and stars Ford Sterling, Mack Swain, Edgar Kennedy, and Al St. John and includes a previously unknown appearance of Charlie Chaplin as a Keystone Cop.

== Revivals ==
Mack Sennett continued to use the Keystone Cops intermittently through the 1920s, but their popularity had waned by the time that sound films arrived. In 1935, director Ralph Staub staged a revival of the Sennett gang for his Warner Brothers short subject Keystone Hotel, featuring a re-creation of the Cops clutching at their hats, leaping in the air in surprise, running energetically in any direction, and taking extreme pratfalls. The Staub version of the Keystone Cops became a template for later re-creations. 20th Century Fox's 1939 film Hollywood Cavalcade had Buster Keaton in a Keystone chase scene. Abbott and Costello Meet the Keystone Kops (1955) included a lengthy chase scene, showcasing a group of stuntmen dressed as Sennett's squad. (Two original Keystone Cops in this film were Heinie Conklin as an elderly studio guard and Hank Mann as a prop man. Sennett also starred in a cameo appearance as himself).

Richard Lester's A Hard Day's Night (1964) has a scene in which the Beatles are chased around the streets by police in the manner of the Keystone Cops to the tune of "Can't Buy Me Love".

In Sydney, Australia, in the 1960s, Rod Hull, Desmond Tester and Penny Spence featured in a local homage series of TV comedy shorts, Caper Cops. "It's a direct steal of the American Keystone Kops [sic], but this is Sydney, Australia, in the late 1960s and who cares..." said creator/star Hull.

Mel Brooks directed a car chase scene in the Keystone Cops' style in his comedy film Silent Movie (1976).

=== Canceled cartoon shorts ===
In the late 1960s, Warner Bros.-Seven Arts was going to create a series of animated cartoon short films based on the Keystone Cops, before being scrapped permanently following the closure of Warner's original animation studio in 1969.

== In popular culture ==
The name has since been used to criticize any group for its mistakes and lack of coordination, particularly if either trait was exhibited after a great deal of energy and activity. For example, in criticizing the Department of Homeland Security's response to Hurricane Katrina, Senator Joseph Lieberman claimed that emergency workers under DHS chief Michael Chertoff "ran around like Keystone Kops, uncertain about what they were supposed to do or uncertain how to do it."

In sport, the term has come into common usage by television commentators, particularly in the United Kingdom and Ireland. The rugby commentator Liam Toland uses the term to describe a team's incompetent performance on the pitch. The phrase "Keystone Cops defending" has become a catchphrase for describing a situation in an English football match where a defensive error or a series of defensive errors leads to a goal. The term was also used in American football commentary to describe the play of the New York Jets against the New England Patriots in the 2012 Butt Fumble game, with sportscaster Cris Collinsworth declaring "This is the Keystone Cops", after the Jets gave up 21 points in 51 seconds.

According to Dave Filoni, supervising director of the animated television series Star Wars: The Clone Wars, the look of the GU-series Guardian police droids is based on the appearance of the Keystone Cops.

The 1983 video game Keystone Kapers, released for the Atari 2600, 5200, MSX and Colecovision, by Activision, featured Officer Keystone Kelly.

The open-source 1987 video game NetHack features Keystone Cops as a type of enemy, appearing whenever a player steals from an in-game shop.

In 2025, the term has been parodied in various articles in The Daily Beast, to mock FBI director Kash Patel by calling him "Keystone Kash".

== See also ==
- Monty Banks
- Glen Cavender
- Barney Fife
- Funny Business (TV series)
- Police Academy (franchise)
