= List of films: M =

indexed lists of films
0–9	A	B	C	D	E	F
G	H	I	J–K	L	M	N–O
P	Q–R	S	T	U–V–W	X–Y–Z	

This is an alphabetical list of film articles (or sections within articles about films). It includes made for television films. See the talk page for the method of indexing used.

== M ==
- M: (1931, 1951, 2007, 2018 French & 2018 Finnish)
- M. Butterfly (1993)
- M3GAN (2022)
- M3GAN 2.0 (2025)

=== Ma ===
- Ma (2019)
- Ma 6-T va crack-er (1997)
- Ma Rainey's Black Bottom (2020)
- Ma Vie en Rose (1997)
- Ma-Mha (2007)

==== Maa ====
- Maa (1952)
- Maa (1959)
- Maa (1976)
- Maa (1991)
- Maa Aavida Collector (1996)
- Maa Abbayi (2017)
- Maa Alludu Very Good (2003)
- Maa Annayya (2000)
- Maa Aur Mamta (1970)
- Maa Ayana Chanti Pilladu (2008)
- Maa Baap (1944)
- Maa Baap Ki Laaj (1946)
- Maa Babu (1960)
- Maa Bahen Aur Biwi (1974)
- Maa Beti (1987)
- Maa Bhoomi (1979)
- Maa Daivam (1976)
- Maa Gopi (1954)
- Maa Iddari Katha (1977)
- Maa Inti Mahalakshmi (1959)
- Maa Inti Premayanam (1983)
- Maa Ka Aanchal (1970)
- Maa Kasam: (1985 & 1999)
- Maa Madurai (2007)
- Maa Nanna Chiranjeevi (2010)
- Maa Nannaku Pelli (1997)
- Maa Ooru (1987)
- Maa Pallelo Gopaludu (1985)
- Maa Pelliki Randi (2001)
- Maa Tujhhe Salaam (2002)
- Maa Vintha Gaadha Vinuma (2020)
- Maa Voori Magadu (1987)
- Maach Mishti & More (2013)
- Maacher Jhol: (2017 feature & 2017 short)
- Maachis (1996)
- Maad Dad (2013)
- Maadi Veettu Ezhai (1981)
- Maadi Veettu Mappilai (1967)
- Maaf, Saya Menghamili Istri Anda (2007)
- Maafa 21 (2009)
- Maafeh Neiy (2010)
- Maaficha Sakshidar (1986)
- Maagiya Kanasu (1977)
- Maahir (1996)
- Maalai Naerathu Mayakkam (2016)
- Maalai Pozhudhin Mayakathilaey (2012)
- Maalai Sooda Vaa (1975)
- Maalaiyitta Mangai (1958)
- Maalamaal (1988)
- Maalayogam (1990)
- Maalgudi Days (2016)
- Maalik: (1972 & 2016)
- Maalika Paniyunnavar (1979)
- Maamaankam (1979)
- Maaman Magal: (1955 & 1995)
- Maamanitham (2022)
- Maami (2011)
- Maamiyar Veedu (1993)
- Maamui (2019)
- Maan Apmaan (1979)
- Maan Gaye Mughal-e-Azam (2008)
- Maan Gaye Ustaad (1981)
- Maan Jao Naa (2018)
- Maan Karate (2014)
- Maan Maryada (1991)
- Maanaadu (2021)
- Maanagara Kaaval (1991)
- Maanagaram (2017)
- Maanasa Sarovara (1982)
- Maanasaandarapetta Yezdi (2016)
- Maanasamrakshanam (1945)
- Maanasaveena (1976)
- Maanaseega Kadhal (1999)
- Maanasthan (2004)
- Maanavan (1970)
- Maanavan Ninaithal (2008)
- Maanaya (2019)
- Maanbumigu Maanavan (1996)
- Maane Thaene Paeye (2020)
- Maang Bharo Sajana (1980)
- Maanga (2015)
- Maangamizi: The Ancient One (2001)
- Maanik (2019)
- Maanikka Thottil (1974)
- Maanikya (2014)
- Maanikyan (2005)
- Maanja Velu (2010)
- Maanmizhiyaal (1990)
- Maanthrikam (1995)
- Maanyanmar (1992)
- Maappillai (1952)
- Maar Dhaad (1988)
- Maara (2021)
- Maaran (2002)
- Maarconi Mathaai (2019)
- Maarg (1992)
- Maari (2015)
- Maari 2 (2018)
- Maaro (2011)
- Maasi (2012)
- Maasilamani (2009)
- Maasthi Gudi (2017)
- Maathaad Maathaadu Mallige (2007)
- Maathangal Ezhu (1993)
- Maathi Yosi (2010)
- Maathina Malla (1998)
- Maathu Tappada Maga (1978)
- Maati (2018)
- Maati Balidan Ki (1986)
- Maati Maay (2007)
- Maato Pettukoku (1995)
- Maatr (2007)
- Maattoly (1978)
- Maattrraan (2012)
- Maavari Manchitanam (1979)
- Maaveeran (1986)
- Maaveeran Kittu (2016)
- Maavichiguru (1996)
- Maavidaakulu (1998)
- Maaya: (1972 & 2014)
- Maaya Rambha (1950)
- Maayai (2013)
- Maayajaalam (2006)
- Maayan (2001)
- Maayanadhi (2020)
- Maayavan (2017)
- Maayavi (2005)
- Maayi (2000)
- Maayon (2022)
- Maazee (2000)
- Maazii (2013)

==== Mab ====
- Mabata Bata (2017)
- Mabel, Fatty and the Law (1915)
- Mabel and Fatty Viewing the World's Fair at San Francisco (1915)
- Mabel and Fatty's Married Life (1915)
- Mabel and Fatty's Simple Life (1915)
- Mabel and Fatty's Wash Day (1915)
- Mabel at the Wheel (1914)
- Mabel's Adventures (1912)
- Mabel's Awful Mistakes (1913)
- Mabel's Blunder (1914)
- Mabel's Busy Day (1914)
- Mabel's Dramatic Career (1913)
- Mabel's Latest Prank (1914)
- Mabel's Lovers (1912)
- Mabel's Married Life (1914)
- Mabel's Nerve (1914)
- Mabel's New Hero (1913)
- Mabel's New Job (1914)
- Mabel's Stormy Love Affair (1914)
- Mabel's Strange Predicament (1914)
- Mabel's Wilful Way (1915)
- Mabo (2012 TV)
- Mabo: Life of an Island Man (1997)
- Maborosi (1997)
- Mabudachi (2001)
- Mabul (2010)

==== Mac ====
- Mac (1992)
- Mac & Devin Go to High School (2012)
- Mac and Me (1988)
- Macabre: (1958, 1980 & 2009)
- Macadam Stories (2015)
- Macadam Tribu (1996)
- The Macaluso Sisters (2020)
- Macao (1952)
- Macario (1960)
- Macario Against Zagomar (1944)
- Macaroni (1985)
- MacArthur (1977)
- MacArthur's Children (1984)
- Macbeth: (1908, 1909 French, 1909 Italian, 1911, 1913, 1915, 1916, 1922, 1948, 1960 American, 1960 Australian, 1965 TV, 1971, 1982, 1987, 2006, 2010 TV, 2015, 2021 & unreleased)
- Macedonian Blood Wedding (1967)
- MacGruber (2010)
- Mach 2 (2001)
- Machan (2008)
- Machete (2010)
- Machete Kills (2013)
- Machhli Jal Ki Rani Hai (2014)
- Machi (2004)
- Machine: (2006 & 2017)
- The Machine: (2013 & 2023)
- The Machine Age (1977 TV)
- The Machine Girl (2008)
- Machine Gun Mama (1944)
- Machine Gun McCain (1969)
- Machine Gun Molly (2004)
- Machine Gun Preacher (2011)
- Machine-Gun Kelly (1958)
- The Machine to Kill Bad People (1952)
- Machines (2016)
- The Machinist (2004)
- The Machinists (2012)
- Macho (2016)
- Macho Callahan (1970)
- Macho Dancer (1988)
- Macho like Me (2010)
- Macho Mustanaa (2012)
- Machuca (2004)
- Macintyre's X-Ray Film (1896)
- Maciste the Athlete (1918)
- Maciste, the Avenger of the Mayans (1965)
- Maciste and the Chinese Chest (1923)
- Maciste alla corte del Gran Khan (1961)
- Maciste and the Javanese (1922)
- Maciste in King Solomon's Mines (1964)
- Maciste in the Lion's Cage (1926)
- Maciste the Policeman (1918)
- Maciste and Prisoner 51 (1923)
- Maciste against the Sheik (1926)
- Maciste and the Silver King's Daughter (1922)
- Maciste on Vacation (1921)
- Maciste's American Nephew (1924)
- The Mack (1973)
- Mack at It Again (1914)
- Mack the Knife: (1989 & 1995)
- Mackenna's Gold (1969)
- The Mackintosh Man (1973)
- Mackintosh and T.J. (1975)
- Maclovia (1948)
- The Macomber Affair (1946)
- Macon County Line (1974)
- Macondo (2014)
- Macross: Do You Remember Love? (1984)
- Macross FB 7: Ore no Uta o Kike! (2012)
- Macu, The Policeman's Woman (1987)
- Macumba Love (1960)
- Macunaíma (1969)
- Macushla (1937)

==== Mad ====
- The Mad (2007)
- Mad About Dance (2014)
- Mad About Mambo (2000)
- Mad About Men (1954)
- Mad About Music (1938)
- Mad About Opera (1948)
- The Mad Adventures of Rabbi Jacob (1973)
- Mad Animals (1939)
- Mad Bastards (2011)
- Mad Bills to Pay (or Destiny, dile que no soy malo) (2026)
- Mad Bomber in Love (1992)
- Mad Buddies (2012)
- Mad City (1997)
- Mad Cowgirl (2006)
- Mad Detective (2007)
- The Mad Doctor of Blood Island (1969)
- Mad Dog and the Butcher (2019)
- Mad Dog Coll: (1961 & 1992)
- Mad Dog and Glory (1993)
- Mad Dog Labine (2018)
- Mad Dog Morgan (1976)
- Mad Dog Time (1996)
- Mad Dogs & Englishmen (1971)
- Mad Dogs and Englishmen (1995)
- Mad Families (2017)
- The Mad Fox (1962)
- Mad Foxes (1981)
- Mad Genius (2017)
- The Mad Ghoul (1943)
- Mad God (2021)
- Mad as Hell (2014)
- Mad Holiday (1936)
- Mad Hot Ballroom (2005)
- Mad Hour (1928)
- Mad Love: (1935, 1995, 2001 & 2015)
- The Mad Magician (1954)
- Mad as a Mars Hare (1963)
- Mad Max series:
  - Mad Max (1979)
  - Mad Max 2: The Road Warrior (1981)
  - Mad Max Beyond Thunderdome (1985)
  - Mad Max: Fury Road (2015)
- The Mad Miss Manton (1938)
- Mad Mom (2019)
- Mad Money (2008)
- Mad Monkey Kung Fu (1979)
- The Mad Monk (1993)
- The Mad Monster (1942)
- Mad Monster Party? (1969)
- Mad at the Moon (1992)
- Mad to Be Normal (2017)
- The Mad Racer (1926)
- Mad Ship (2012)
- The Mad Women's Ball (2021)
- Mad World (2016)
- Mad Youth (1940)
- Madaalasa (1978)
- Madaari (2016)
- Madadayo (1993)
- Madadgaar (1987)
- Madagascar (1994)
- Madagascar series:
  - Madagascar (2005)
  - Madagascar: Escape 2 Africa (2008)
  - Madagascar 3: Europe's Most Wanted (2012)
- Madagascar, a Journey Diary (2009)
- Madagascar Skin (1995)
- Madai Thiranthu (unreleased)
- Madakkayathra (1985)
- Madalena (1960)
- Madalena (2021)
- Madam (1994)
- Madam Chief Minister (2021)
- Madam Oh (1965)
- Madam Rani (1995)
- Madam Satan (1930)
- Madam Temptation (1948)
- Madam Who? (1918)
- Madam X (1994)
- Madam Yankelova's Fine Literature Club (2017)
- Madamakki (2016)
- Madame: (1961 & 2017)
- Madame Baptiste (1974)
- Madame du Barry: (1928 & 1954)
- Madame Behave (1925)
- Madame Bluebeard (1931)
- Madame Bo-Peep (1917)
- Madame Bovary: (1934, 1937, 1947, 1949, 1969, 1991 & 2014)
- Madame Butterfly: (1915, 1932, 1954 & 1995)
- Madame Butterfly's Illusion (1940)
- Madame Courage (2015)
- Madame Curie (1943)
- Madame Dares an Escapade (1927)
- Madame Double X (1914)
- Madame Du Barry: (1917 & 1934)
- Madame Dubarry (1919)
- Madame Édouard (2004)
- Madame et son flirt (1946)
- Madame Freedom (1956)
- Madame Golvery (1923)
- Madame Guillotine: (1916 & 1931)
- Madame and Her Niece (1969)
- Madame Hyde (2017)
- Madame Irma (2006)
- Madame Jealousy (1918)
- Madame de La Pommeraye's Intrigues (1922)
- Madame Louise (1951)
- Madame Lu (1929)
- Madame Makes Her Exit (1932)
- Madamigella di Maupin (1966)
- Madame Mystery (1926)
- Madame besøker Oslo (1927)
- Madame Peacock (1920)
- Madame Pinkette & Co (1917)
- Madame Pompadour: (1927 & 1931)
- Madame la Presidente (1916)
- Madame Racketeer (1932)
- Madame Récamier: (1920 & 1928)
- Madame Rosa (1977)
- Madame Sans-Gêne: (1911 & 1925)
- Madame Satã (2002)
- Madame Sherry (1917)
- Madame Sin (1972)
- Madame Sphinx (1918)
- Madame Spy: (1918, 1934 & 1942)
- Madame Sousatzka (1988)
- Madame Tutli-Putli (2007)
- Madame Wants No Children: (1926 & 1933)
- Madame Web (2024)
- Madame X: (1916, 1920, 1929, 1937, 1954, 1955, 1966 & 1981 TV)
- Madampi (2008)
- Madana (2006)
- Madana Gopaludu (1987)
- Madana Kama Rajan (1941)
- Madana Mohini (1953)
- Madanolsavam (1978)
- Madappura (1962)
- Madatha Kaja (2011)
- Madatharuvi (1967)
- Mädchen in Uniform (1931)
- Madcap Mabel (2010)
- Madcap Madge (1917)
- Maddalena (1954)
- Maddalena, Zero for Conduct (1940)
- The Maddening (1995)
- Maddie's Secret (2025)
- Made: (1972 & 2001)
- Made in America: (1993 & 2013)
- Made in Argentina (1987)
- Made in Ash (2012)
- Made in Australia (2013)
- Made in Bangladesh: (2007 & 2019)
- Made on Broadway (1933)
- Made in Britain (1982)
- Made in China: (2009, 2014 & 2019)
- Made in Cleveland (2013)
- Made in Dagenham (2010)
- Made for Each Other: (1939, 1953, 1971 & 2009)
- Made in France (2015)
- Made in Heart (2014)
- Made in Heaven: (1921, 1952 & 1987)
- Made in Hong Kong (1997)
- Made of Honor (2008)
- Made in Hungaria (2010)
- Made in Israel (2001)
- Made in Italy: (1965 & 2020)
- Made in Japan: Kora! (2011)
- Made in L.A. (2007)
- Made for Love (1926)
- Made in Mauritius (2009)
- Made Men (1999)
- Made in Milan (1990)
- Made in Paris (1966)
- Made in Romania (2010)
- Made in Sheffield (2002)
- Made in Sweden (1969)
- Made in U.S.A.: (1966 & 1987)
- Made in YU (2005)
- Madea series:
  - Diary of a Mad Black Woman (2005)
  - Madea's Family Reunion (2006)
  - Meet the Browns (2008)
  - Madea Goes to Jail (2009)
  - I Can Do Bad All by Myself (2009)
  - Madea's Big Happy Family (2011)
  - Madea's Witness Protection (2012)
  - A Madea Christmas (2013)
  - Madea's Tough Love (2015)
  - Boo! A Madea Halloween (2016)
  - Boo 2! A Madea Halloween (2017)
  - A Madea Family Funeral (2019)
  - A Madea Homecoming (2022)
  - Madea's Destination Wedding (2025)
- Madeinusa (2005)
- Madeleine: (1919, 1950 & 2003)
- Madeline (1998)
- Madeline: Lost in Paris (1999)
- Madeline's Madeline (2018)
- Mademoiselle: (1966 & 2001)
- Mademoiselle from Armentières (1926)
- Mademoiselle Chiffon (1919)
- Mademoiselle Fifi (1944)
- Mademoiselle Gobete (1952)
- Mademoiselle Has Fun (1948)
- Mademoiselle Josette, My Woman: (1926, 1933 & 1950)
- Mademoiselle ma mère (1937)
- Mademoiselle Midnight (1924)
- Mademoiselle Modiste (1926)
- Mademoiselle Mozart (1935)
- Mademoiselle Parley Voo (1928)
- Mademoiselle Swing (1942)
- Madesha (2008)
- Madha (2019)
- Madha Gaja Raja (2025)
- Madha Mathu Manasi (2016)
- Madha Yaanai Koottam (2013)
- Madhanamala (1947)
- Madhavayya Gari Manavadu (1992)
- Madhaveeyam (2019)
- Madhavi (2009)
- Madhavikutty (1973)
- Madhosh: (1951, 1974 & 1994)
- Madhoshi (2004)
- Madhouse: (1974, 1981, 1990 & 2004)
- Madhu: (1959 & 2006)
- Madhu Chandra (1979)
- Madhu Malathi (1966)
- Madhu Malti (1978)
- Madhubala (1950)
- Madhubana Kadai (2012)
- Madhuchandralekha (2006)
- Madhumasam (2007)
- Madhumati: (1958, 2011 & 2013)
- Madhur Milan (2000)
- Madhura Naranga (2015)
- Madhura Raja (2019)
- Madhura Sangama (1978)
- Madhura Swapanam (1977)
- Madhuraiyai Meetta Sundharapandiyan (1978)
- Madhuram Thirumadhuram (1976)
- Madhuranombarakattu (2000)
- Madhurappathinezhu (1975)
- Madhurey (2004)
- Madhuri: (1989 & 2018)
- Madhurikkunna Raathri (1978)
- Madhusudan (1941)
- Madhuve Madu Tamashe Nodu (1986)
- Madhuvidhu (1970)
- Madhuvidhu Theerum Mumbe (1985)
- Madhvacharya (1986)
- Madhya Venal (2009)
- Madhyamvarg: The Middle Class (2014)
- Madhyanam Hathya (2004)
- Madicken på Junibacken (1980)
- Madigan (1968)
- Madigan's Millions (1969)
- Madipu (2017)
- Madirasi (2012)
- Madison (2001)
- Madison Avenue (1961)
- Madison County (2011)
- Madison Square Garden (1932)
- Madly Bangalee (2009)
- Madly in Love: (1943 & 1981)
- Madman (1982)
- The Madman (1911)
- Madman and Vagabond (1946)
- Madman at War (1985)
- Madmast Barkhaa (2015)
- Madness: (1919, 1980, 1992 & 2010)
- Madness of the Heart (1949)
- The Madness of King George (1994)
- Madness of Love (1953)
- Madness for Love (1948)
- Madness in the Method (2019)
- Madness Rules (1947)
- Madness of Youth (1923)
- Mado (1976)
- Mado, Hold for Pick Up (1990)
- Madol Duwa (1976)
- Madonna: (1999 & 2015)
- Madonna of Avenue A (1929)
- Madonna in Chains (1949)
- Madonna of the Desert (1948)
- Madonna: Innocence Lost (1994 TV)
- Madonna of the Seven Moons (1945)
- Madonna of the Sleeping Cars: (1928 & 1955)
- Madonna of the Storm (1913)
- Madonna of the Streets: (1924 & 1930)
- Madonna: Truth or Dare (1991)
- Madonna's Pig (2011)
- Madonnas and Men (1920)
- Madras (2014)
- Madras Cafe (2013)
- Madras Mail (1936)
- Madras to Pondicherry (1966)
- Madrasa (2013)
- Madrasapattinam (2010)
- Madrasi (2006)
- Madrasile Mon (1982)
- Madrasta (1996)
- Madraza (2017)
- Madre (2016)
- Madre Alegría (1950)
- Madrid, 1987 (2011)
- Madrid Carnival (1941)
- Madron (1970)
- Madrugada (1957)
- Madtown (2016)
- Madu Tiga (1964)
- Madunnella (1948)
- Madura Veeran (2018)
- Madurai Meenakshi (1993)
- Madurai Ponnu Chennai Paiyan (2008)
- Madurai Sambavam (2009)
- Madurai Veeran: (1956 & 2007)
- Madurai Veeran Enga Saami (1990)
- Maduve Aagona Baa (2001)
- Maduve Madi Nodu (1965)
- Maduve Maduve Maduve (1969)
- Maduve Mane (2011)
- Maduveya Mamatheya Kareyole (2016)
- The Madwoman of Chaillot (1969)

==== Mae–Maf ====
- Mae West (1982 TV)
- Maedeli la brèche (1980)
- Maelström (2000)
- The Maelstrom (1917)
- The Maelstrom of Paris (1928)
- Maestra (2011)
- Maestro: (2003, 2005, 2014, 2021 & 2023)
- The Maestro (2018)
- Maestro Levita (1938)
- Maestro! (2015)
- Maestro Levita (1938)
- Maestro Thief (1994)
- Maestros (2000)
- Maeve (1981)
- Mafia: (1993, 1996 & 2002)
- Mafia! (1998)
- Mafia: Chapter 1 (2020)
- Mafia Connection (1970)
- Mafia Inc. (2019)
- The Mafia Is No Longer What It Used to Be (2019)
- The Mafia Kills Only in Summer (2013)
- Mafia Mamma (2023)
- Mafia vs. Ninja (1984)
- Mafia Raaj (1998)
- The Mafia Triangle (1981)
- Mafioso (1962)
- The Mafu Cage (1978)

==== Mag ====
- Mág (1988)
- Maga Maharaju (1983)
- Maga Mommaga (1974)
- Magaadu: (1976 & 1990)
- Magadheera (2009)
- Magadheerudu (1986)
- Magalir Mattum: (1994 & 2017)
- Magalirkkaga (2000)
- Magallanes (2014)
- Magandang Hatinggabi (1998)
- Magane En Marumagane (2010)
- Magane Magane (1982)
- Maganey Kel (1965)
- Magaraasi (1967)
- Magathala Nattu Mary (1957)
- Magda: (1917 & 2004)
- Magda Expelled (1938)
- Magdalena (1955)
- The Magdalene Sisters (2002)
- Magdana's Donkey (1956)
- Mage Wam Atha (2002)
- Mage Yalu Malu (2016)
- Magenta (1996)
- The Maggie (1954)
- Maggie (2015)
- Maggie's Christmas Miracle (2017)
- Maggie's First False Step (1917)
- Maggie's Plan (2015)
- Magi (2016)
- Magia Russica (2004)
- Magic: (1917, 1978 & 2021)
- The Magic 7 (2005) (TV)
- Magic Ajji (2005)
- Magic Bay (2002)
- Magic Beach (2025)
- Magic Beyond Words (2011)
- Magic & Bird: A Courtship of Rivals (2010)
- The Magic Box (1951)
- Magic Boy (1959)
- Magic Camp (2020)
- Magic Card (2015)
- Magic Carpet Ride (2005)
- The Magic Christian (1969)
- Magic City Memoirs (2011)
- The Magic Cloak of Oz (1914)
- Magic Concert (1953)
- Magic Cop (1990)
- The Magic Faraway Tree (2026)
- Magic Farm (2025)
- Magic Fire (1955)
- The Magic Flute: (1975 & 2006)
- Magic Flute Diaries (2008)
- Magic Fountain (1963)
- The Magic Fountain (1963)
- Magic Hour: (2011 & 2025)
- The Magic Hour (2008)
- The Magic House (1939)
- Magic Hunter (1994)
- Magic Island (1995)
- Magic Kid (1993)
- Magic Kid 2 (1994)
- Magic Kitchen (2004)
- Magic Lamp (2008)
- The Magic of Lassie (1978)
- Magic Lizard (1985)
- Magic Magic (2013)
- Magic Magic 3D (2003)
- Magic Man (2010)
- Magic Matterhorn (1995)
- Magic Mike (2012)
- Magic Mike XXL (2015)
- Magic Mike's Last Dance (2023)
- Magic Mirror (2005)
- Magic in the Moonlight (2014)
- Magic Rock (2001)
- The Magic Roundabout (2005)
- Magic Silver (2009)
- Magic Silver II (2011)
- The Magic Sword: (1901, 1950 & 1962)
- Magic Temple (1996)
- Magic Town (1947)
- Magic in Town (1968)
- Magic Tree House (2011)
- Magic Trick (1953)
- Magic Trip (2011)
- Magic Village (1955)
- Magic Waltz (1918)
- Magic in the Water (1995)
- Magic to Win (2011)
- Magic Wonderland (2014)
- Magical Death (1973)
- Magical Flowers (1995)
- Magical Girl (2014)
- The Magical Legend of the Leprechauns (1999) (TV)
- Magical Maestro (1952)
- Magical Mystery Tour (1967 TV)
- Magical Nights (2018)
- Magical Universe (2013)
- Magician (1967)
- Magician: The Astonishing Life and Work of Orson Welles (2014)
- The Magician: (1898, 1926, 1958 & 2005)
- Magician Mickey (1937)
- Magicians (2007)
- Magika (2010)
- Magikland (2020)
- Maging Sino Ka Man (1991)
- Magistrarna på sommarlov (1941)
- Magiting at Pusakal (1972)
- Magizhchi (2010)
- Magkakabaung (2014)
- Magkano ang Iyong Dangal? (1988)
- Magma: Volcanic Disaster (2006)
- Magnat (1987)
- Magnet of Doom (1963)
- Magnetic (2015)
- Magnetické vlny léčí (1965)
- Magnificat (1993)
- The Magnificent Ambersons (1942)
- Magnificent Bodyguards (1978)
- Magnificent Brute (1936)
- Magnificent Desolation: Walking on the Moon 3D (2005)
- Magnificent Doll (1946)
- The Magnificent Flirt (1928)
- Magnificent Obsession: (1935 & 1954)
- Magnificent Presence (2012)
- Magnificent Roughnecks (1956)
- Magnificent Ruffians (1979)
- The Magnificent Seven (1960 & 2016)
- The Magnificent Seven Deadly Sins (1971)
- Magnificent Sinner (1959)
- Magnificent Team (1998)
- Magnificent Warriors (1987)
- Magnifico (2003)
- Magnolia (1999)
- Magnum Force (1973)
- Magnus (2016)
- Magnús (1989)
- Mago Digo Dai (2010)
- Magoo's Puddle Jumper (1956)
- Magos y Gigantes (2003)
- Magrib (1993)
- Magroor: (1950 & 1979)
- Magudam (1992)
- Magudikkaran (1994)
- Magunira Shagada (2002)

==== Mah ====
- Mah e Mir (2016)
- Mah Nakorn (2004)
- Maha (2022)
- Maha Badmaash (1977)
- Maha Maha (2015)
- Maha Manishi (1985)
- Maha Nadigan (2004)
- Maha Prachandaru (1981)
- Maha Purusha (1985)
- Maha Purushudu (1981)
- Maha Samudram (2021)
- Maha-Sangram (1990)
- Maha Sati Savitri (1973)
- Maha Shaktimaan (1985)
- Maha Shaktishaali (1994)
- Mahaadev (1989)
- Mahaan (1983)
- Mahaan Hutatma (2018)
- Mahaan Kanakku (2011)
- Mahaanta (1997)
- Mahanagar (1963)
- Mahaashilpi (1966)
- Mahabali (1983)
- Mahabalipuram (2015)
- Mahabharat: (1965 & 2013)
- Mahabharat Aur Barbareek (2013)
- Mahadeshwara Pooja Phala (1975)
- Mahadevi (1957)
- Mahadiga (2004)
- Mahaguru: (1985 & 2007)
- Mahajananiki Maradalu Pilla (1990)
- Mahakaal: (1994 & 2008)
- Mahakavi Kalidas: (1942 & 1966)
- Mahakavi Kalidasa (1955)
- Mahakavi Kalidasu (1960)
- Mahakavi Kshetrayya (1976)
- Mahakshathriya (1994)
- Mahal: (1949 & 1969)
- Mahalaya (2019)
- Mahalia Melts in the Rain (2018)
- Mahamantri Timmarusu (1962)
- Mahamaya (1944)
- Mahana (2016)
- Mahanadhi (1994)
- Mahanagar (1963)
- Mahanagaram (1992)
- Mahanagaramlo Mayagadu (1984)
- Mahanandi (2005)
- Mahanati (2018)
- Mahanayak Vasant Tu (2015)
- Mahanayika (2016)
- Mahanubhavaru (2017)
- Mahanubhavudu (2017)
- Mahaprabhu (1996)
- Mahaprithibi (1991)
- Mahapurush (1965)
- Mahapurush O Kapurush (2013)
- Maharaja: (1998, 2005 & 2011)
- Maharaja Ajasath (2015)
- Maharaja Gemunu (2015)
- Maharaja Talkies (2011)
- Maharajavu (1989)
- Maharana Pratap: The First Freedom Fighter (2012)
- Maharani Minaldevi (1946)
- Maharasan (1993)
- Maharathi: (2007 & 2008)
- Maharathi Karna (1944)
- Maharlika (1987)
- Maharshi: (1987 & 2019)
- Mahasadhvi Mallamma (2005)
- Mahasamar (2013)
- Mahasamudram (2006)
- Mahasathi Anasuya (1965)
- Mahasathi Arundathi (1968)
- Mahasati Ansuya (1943)
- Mahathma Kabir (1962)
- Mahatma (2009)
- Mahatma Kabir (1947)
- Mahatma: Life of Gandhi, 1869–1948 (1968)
- Mahatma Phule (1954)
- Mahatma Vidur (1943)
- Mahatmudu (1976)
- Mahaul Theek Hai (1999)
- Mahaveera (1988)
- Mahaveera Bheeman (1962)
- Mahayanam (1989)
- Mahazar (1991)
- Mahek (2007)
- Maheman (1942)
- Maherchi Sadi (1991)
- Maheshinte Prathikaaram (2016)
- Maheswari (1955)
- Mahira (2019)
- Mahirap Maging Pogi (1992)
- Mahiravana (1940)
- Mahiru no ankoku (1956)
- Mahishasura Mardini (1959)
- Mahjong (1996)
- Mahjong hōrōki (1984)
- Mahler (1974)
- Mahler on the Couch (2010)
- Mahlia the Mestiza (1943)
- Mahogany (1975)
- Mahuaa (2018)
- Mahulbanir Sereng (2004)

==== Mai ====
- Mai: (1989 & 2013)
- Mai Baap (1959)
- Mai Mai Miracle (2009)
- Mai Ratima (2012)
- The Maid (1991, 2005 & 2009)
- Maid for Each Other (1992)
- Maid Happy (1933)
- Maid in Manhattan (2002)
- Maid of the Mist (1915)
- Maid to Order (1987)
- Maid in Paris (1956)
- Maid of Salem (1937)
- Maid o' the Storm (1918)
- Maid in Sweden (1971)
- Maid, Thief and Guard (1958)
- Maid's Night Out (1938)
- Maidaan (2021)
- Maidan: (1982 & 2014)
- Maiden (2018)
- Maiden Vows (2010)
- Maiden's Cheek (1959)
- Maiden's Rock (1922)
- Maids (2001)
- The Maids (1975)
- Maids and Muslin (1920)
- Maidstone (1970)
- Maigret: (1988 TV & 2022)
- Maigret a Pigalle (1966)
- Maigret et l'affaire Saint-Fiacre (1959)
- Maigret Sets a Trap (1958)
- Maigret voit rouge (1963)
- Maiko Haaaan!!! (2007)
- Maikol Yordan de Viaje Perdido (2014)
- Mail (2021)
- Mail and Female (1937)
- Mail Order Bride: (1964, 1984 & 2008)
- Mailman Mueller (1953)
- Main Aisa Hi Hoon (2005)
- Main Aur Charles (2015)
- Main Aur Mera Haathi (1981)
- Main Aur Mr. Riight (2014)
- Main Aurr Mrs Khanna (2009)
- Main Awara Hoon (1983)
- Main Azaad Hoon (1989)
- Main Balwaan (1986)
- Main Bhi Ladki Hoon (1964)
- Main Chup Rahungi (1962)
- The Main Event (1979)
- Main Hari (1940)
- Main Hoon Na (2004)
- Main Hoon Part-Time Killer (2015)
- Main Hoon Shahid Afridi (2013)
- Main Intequam Loonga (1982)
- Main Jatti Punjab Di (1964)
- Main Khiladi Tu Anari (1994)
- Main Krishna Hoon (2013)
- Main Khudiram Bose Hun (2017)
- Main Prem Ki Diwani Hoon (2003)
- Main Tulsi Tere Aangan Ki (1978)
- Maine Pyar Kiya (1989)
- Mainstream (2020)
- Maîtresse (1973)

==== Maj ====
- Maj Rati Keteki (2017)
- Majaa (2005)
- Majaal (1987)
- Majajan (2006)
- Majaz: Ae Gham-e-Dil Kya Karun (2017)
- Majboor: (1964, 1974 & 1990)
- Majestic (2002)
- The Majestic (2001)
- The Majesty of the Law (1915)
- Majha Chakula (1994)
- Majhail (2025)
- Majhli Didi (1967)
- Majid (2010)
- Majnoon (2024)
- Majnu: (1987, 2016 & 2022)
- Majnun (2016)
- Majoor Frans (1916)
- Major (2022)
- The Major (2013)
- Major Barbara (1941)
- The Major and the Bulls (1955)
- Major Chandrakanth: (1966 & 1993)
- Major Dundee (1965)
- Major Grom (2017)
- Major Grom: The Game (2024)
- Major Grom: Plague Doctor (2021)
- Major Khaled's War (1971 TV)
- Major League series:
  - Major League (1989)
  - Major League II (1994)
  - Major League: Back to the Minors (1998)
- The Major Lied 'Til Dawn (1938)
- The Major and the Minor (1942)
- Major Payne (1995)
- Major Saab (1998)
- The Major Tones (2023)
- Major Whirlwind (1967 TV)
- Major Wilson's Last Stand (1899)
- The Majorettes (1986)
- Majority (2010)
- A Majority of One (1961)
- Majstori, majstori (1980)
- Majuba: Heuwel van Duiwe (1968)
- Majubooru Loabi (2000)
- Majunu (2001)

==== Mak ====
- Makala (2017)
- Makalkku (2005)
- Makam Piranna Manka (1977)
- Makan Ente Makan (1985)
- Makan esmoh alwatan (2006)
- Makane Ninakku Vendi (1971)
- Makara Vilakku (1980)
- Makarov (1993)
- Makdee (2002)
- Make Believe Ballroom (1949)
- Make Believe Revue (1935)
- Make a Fake (2011)
- Make Haste to Live (1954)
- Make It Big (2002)
- Make It Big Big (2019)
- Make It Funky! (2005)
- Make It Happen (2008)
- Make Like a Thief (1964)
- Make Me Famous (2020)
- Make Me Happy (1935)
- Make Me an Offer (1954)
- Make Me a Star (1932)
- Make a Million (1935)
- Make Mine Freedom (1948)
- Make Mine Laughs (1949)
- Make Mine Mink (1960)
- Make Mine Music (1946)
- Make a Move (2014)
- Make Up (1927)
- Make Way for Tomorrow (1937)
- Make a Wish: (1937, 2006 & 2011)
- Make Your Move (2013)
- Make Your Own Bed (1944)
- Make the Yuletide Gay (2009)
- Make-out with Violence (2008)
- Make-Up (1937)
- Maker of Men (1931)
- Maker of Monsters: The Extraordinary Life of Beau Dick (2017)
- Makeroom (2018)
- Makers: Women Who Make America (2013)
- Makers of Melody (1929)
- Makeup Man (2011)
- Making an American Citizen (1912)
- Making Auntie Welcome (1914)
- Making Babies (2001)
- The Making of Fanny and Alexander (1984)
- Making Friends (1936)
- Making Good (1932)
- Making the Grade: (1929 & 1984)
- Making the Headlines (1938)
- Making It (1971)
- Making It Pleasant for Him (1909)
- Making a Killing (2018)
- The Making of a Legend: Gone with the Wind (1988)
- Making a Living (1914)
- Making Love (1982)
- Making of a Male Model (1983 TV)
- Making a Man (1922)
- The Making of a Man (1911)
- Making Montgomery Clift (2018)
- Making Mr. Right (1987)
- Making Of (2006)
- Making Overtures: The Story of a Community Orchestra (1985)
- Making Plans for Lena (2009)
- Making Sandwiches (1998)
- Making Stars (1935)
- Making Up! (1993)
- Making the Varsity (1928)
- Making Waves: The Art of Cinematic Sound (2019)
- The Makioka Sisters (1983)
- Makiusap Ka sa Diyos (1991)
- Makkal (1975)
- Makkal Aatchi (1995)
- Mako: The Jaws of Death (1976)
- Maku ga Agaru (2015)

==== Mal ====
- Mal-Mo-E: The Secret Mission (2019)
- Mala: (1941 & 2013)
- Mala Aai Vhhaychy! (2011)
- Mala Época (1998)
- Mala hembra (1950)
- Mala leche (2004)
- Mala Mala (2014)
- Mala Noche (1985)
- Mala Oru Mangala Vilakku (1959)
- Malaal (2019)
- Malaga (1954)
- Malai Malai (2009)
- Malaikat Tanpa Sayap (2012)
- Malaikkallan (1954)
- Malaikottai (2007)
- Malaiyoor Mambattiyan (1983)
- Malajahna (1965)
- Malamaal Weekly (2006)
- Malambo: (1942 & 1984)
- Malambo, the Good Man (2018)
- Malamor (2003)
- Malamore (1982)
- Malamukalile Daivam (1983)
- Malan (1942)
- Malang (2020)
- Malanga (1986)
- Malankattu (1980)
- Malapata (2017)
- Malappuram Haji Mahanaya Joji (1994)
- Malaria: (1919, 1943 & 2016)
- Malarinum Melliya (2008)
- Malarum Kiliyum (1986)
- Malarvaadi Arts Club (2010)
- Malaspina (1947)
- Malaya (1949)
- Malcolm (1986)
- Malcolm & Marie (2021)
- Malcolm X: (1972 & 1992)
- La Maldicion de la Bestia (1975)
- Male and Female (1919)
- Malèna (2000)
- Maleficent (2014)
- Maleficent: Mistress of Evil (2019)
- Malevil (1972)
- Malevolence (2004)
- Malibu High (1979)
- Malibu's Most Wanted (2003)
- Malice: (1926 & 1993)
- Malice in Wonderland: (1985 TV & 2009)
- Malicious: (1973, 1995 & 2018)
- Malignant: (2013 & 2021)
- Mallboy (2001)
- Malli (1998)
- Mallrats (1995)
- Malta Story (1953)
- The Maltese Falcon: (1931 & 1941)

==== Mam ====
- Mam (2010)
- Mama: (1990 & 2013)
- Mama Alludu (1990)
- Mama Bagunnava (1997)
- Mama Bhanja (1977)
- Mama Colonel (2017)
- Mama Don't Cry (1998)
- Mama Dracula (1980)
- Mama Flora's Family (1998) (TV)
- Mama, I Want to Sing! (2012)
- Mama, I'm Alive (1977)
- Mamá Inés (1945)
- Mama Jack (2005)
- Mama Ji (1964)
- Mama Loves Papa: (1933 & 1945)
- Mama Manchu Alludu Kanchu (2015)
- Mama Married (1969)
- Mama Runs Wild (1937)
- Mama Steps Out (1937)
- Mama, There's a Man in Your Bed (1989)
- Mama Turns 100 (1979)
- Mama's Affair (1921)
- Mama's Boy (2007)
- Mama's Dirty Girls (1974)
- Mama's Girl (2018)
- Mama's Gone A-Hunting (1977)
- Mama's Little Pirate (1934)
- Mamaboy (2017)
- Mamachya Gavala Jaaoo Yaa (2014)
- Mamakiki (2020)
- Mamalakalkkappurathu (1988)
- Maman (2012)
- Maman Last Call (2005)
- Mamangam (2019)
- Mamarazzi (2010)
- Mamaroš (2013)
- Mamathe (1968)
- Mamatheya Bandhana (1966)
- Mamatheya Madilu (1985)
- Mamay (2003)
- Mamba (1930)
- Mambattiyan (2011)
- Mambéty for Ever (2008)
- Mambo (1954)
- Mambo Italiano (2003)
- Mambru Went to War (1985)
- Mame (1974)
- Mameshiba Ichirō 3D (2012)
- Mami (1971)
- Mamie (2016)
- Mamiya kyodai (2006)
- Mamiyar (1953)
- Mamiyar Mechina Marumagal (1959)
- Mamiyarum Oru Veetu Marumagale (1961)
- Mamma (1982)
- Mamma Ebe (1985)
- Mamma Gógó (2010)
- Mamma mia, che impressione! (1951)
- Mamma Mia (1995)
- Mamma Mia! (2008)
- Mamma Mia! Here We Go Again (2018)
- Mamma Moo and the Crow (2008)
- Mamma Roma (1962)
- Mamma's Boys (1916)
- Mammal (2016)
- Mammalian (2010)
- Mammame (1986)
- Mammoth: (2006 TV & 2009)
- Mammuth (2010)
- Mammy: (1930 & 1951)
- Mampazhakkalam (2004)
- Mamsell Nitouche (1932)
- Mamta: (1942, 1952 & 1966)

==== Man ====
- The Man: (1972 & 2005)
- A Man About the House (1947)
- Man About Town (2006)
- A Man for All Seasons: (1966 & 1988)
- A Man Apart (2003)
- Man of Aran (1934)
- A Man on the Beach (1955)
- A Man Before His Time (1971)
- The Man Behind the Gun (1953)
- The Man Behind the Mask (1936)
- A Man Betrayed: (1936 & 1941)
- Man Bites Dog (1992)
- The Man from Blankley's (1930)
- A Man from the Boulevard des Capuchines (1987)
- A Man Called Gannon (1968)
- A Man Called Hero (1999)
- A Man Called Horse (1970)
- A Man Called Otto (2022)
- A Man Called Ove (2015)
- A Man Called Sarge (1990)
- Man of the Century (1999)
- The Man from the Deep River (1972)
- The Man from Earth (2007)
- The Man from Elysian Fields (2002)
- A Man Escaped (1956)
- Man Facing Southeast (1987)
- Man on Fire: (1987 & 2004)
- Man of Flowers (1983)
- Man on the Flying Trapeze (1935)
- Man of the Frontier (1936)
- Man of God: (2021 & 2022)
- The Man with the Golden Arm (1955)
- The Man with the Golden Gun (1974)
- The Man in the Gray Flannel Suit (1956)
- The Man in Grey (1943)
- The Man from Home: (1914 & 1922)
- The Man from Hong Kong (1975)
- Man of the House: (1995 & 2005)
- Man Hunt: (1941 & 1985)
- Man of Iron (1981)
- The Man with the Iron Fists (2012)
- The Man with the Iron Fists 2 (2015)
- The Man in the Iron Mask: (1923, 1939, 1977 TV, 1985 TV & 1998)
- The Man from Laramie (1955)
- Man on a Ledge (2012)
- The Man from London (2007)
- The Man with the Magic Box (2017)
- Man of La Mancha (1972)
- Man of Marble (1977)
- Man of the Match (2022)
- Man with a Million (1954)
- The Man in the Moon (1991)
- Man on the Moon (1999)
- Man with a Movie Camera (1929)
- The Man with Nine Lives (1940)
- A Man of No Importance (1994)
- The Man Nobody Knew (2011)
- The Man from Nowhere: (1937, 1961 & 2010)
- The Man from O.R.G.Y. (1970)
- The Man with One Red Shoe (1985)
- The Man on the Other Side (2019)
- The Man from Planet X (1951)
- Man Push Cart (2005)
- The Man with Rain in His Shoes (1998)
- The Man on the Roof (1976)
- Man with the Screaming Brain (2005)
- The Man in Search of His Murderer (1931)
- The Man in the Sky (1957)
- The Man from Snowy River: (1920 & 1982)
- The Man from Snowy River II (1988)
- Man of Steel (2013)
- Man on a Swing (1974)
- Man of a Thousand Faces (1957)
- Man on a Tightrope (1953)
- The Man from Toronto: (1933 & 2022)
- The Man with the Twisted Lip (1921)
- The Man with Two Brains (1983)
- The Man from U.N.C.L.E. (2015)
- A Man Vanishes (1967)
- Man Walking Around a Corner (1887)
- Man Wanted: (1932 & 1995)
- Man Wants to Live (1961)
- Man of the West (1958)
- The Man in the White Suit (1951)
- The Man Who Bought London (1916)
- The Man Who Came to Dinner: (1942 & 1972 TV)
- The Man Who Captured Eichmann (1996)
- The Man Who Cheated Himself (1950)
- The Man Who Could Not Laugh (1968)
- The Man Who Could Work Miracles (1936)
- The Man Who Cried (2000)
- The Man Who Defended Gavrilo Princip (2014)
- The Man Who Drew God (2022)
- The Man Who Fell to Earth (1976)
- The Man Who Invented Christmas (2017)
- The Man Who Killed Don Quixote (2018)
- The Man Who Killed Hitler and Then the Bigfoot (2018)
- The Man Who Knew Infinity (2015)
- The Man Who Knew Too Little (1997)
- The Man Who Knew Too Much: (1934 & 1956)
- The Man Who Laughs: (1928, 1966 & 2012)
- The Man Who Lies (1968)
- The Man Who Liked Funerals (1959)
- The Man Who Loved Cat Dancing (1973)
- The Man Who Loved Women: (1977 & 1983)
- The Man Who Never Was (1956)
- The Man Who Reclaimed His Head (1934)
- The Man Who Shot Liberty Valance (1962)
- The Man Who Sleeps (1974)
- The Man Who Sued God (2001)
- The Man Who Turned to Stone (1957)
- The Man Who Was Sherlock Holmes (1937)
- A Man Who Was Superman (2008)
- The Man Who Wasn't There: (1983, 1987 & 2001)
- The Man Who Would Be King (1975)
- Man in the Wilderness (1971)
- Man on Wire (2008)
- The Man Without a Face (1993)
- The Man Without Gravity (2019)
- The Man Without a Past (2002)
- Man Without a Star (1955)
- A Man and a Woman (1966)
- A Man and a Woman: 20 Years Later (1986)
- Man of the Year (2006)
- Man's Best Friend (1993)
- Man's Favorite Sport? (1964)
- A Man, a Real One (2003)
- Man-Thing (2005) (TV)
- Management (2009)
- Manatsu no Chikyū (1991)
- Manchester by the Sea (2016)
- The Manchurian Candidate: (1962 & 2004)
- Mandabi (1968)
- Mandala (1981)
- Mandela: Long Walk to Freedom (2013)
- Manderlay (2005)
- Mandibles (2020)
- Mandingo (1975)
- Mandragora (1997)
- Mandy (2018)
- Mangal Pandey (2005)
- Mangetsu no Kuchizuke (1989)
- Manglehorn (2014)
- The Mangler (1995)
- The Mangler Reborn (2005)
- Manhandled (1924 & 1949)
- Manhatta (1922)
- Manhattan: (1924 & 1979)
- Manhattan Baby (1982)
- Manhattan Melodrama (1934)
- Manhattan Murder Mystery (1993)
- The Manhattan Project (1986)
- Manhood (2003)
- Manhunter (1986)
- Maniac: (1934, 1963, 1980 & 2012)
- Maniac Cop (1988)
- Maniac Cop 2 (1990)
- Manic (2003)
- Manila in the Claws of Light (1975)
- The Manitou (1979)
- Mank (2020)
- Manly Times (1977)
- Mann (1999)
- Mannequin: (1937 & 1987)
- Manolete (2006)
- Manon des Sources (1986)
- The Manor (2021)
- Manos: The Hands of Fate (1966)
- Le Mans (1971)
- Mansfield Park: (1999 & 2007 TV)
- Mansion of the Living Dead (1982)
- Manson (1973)
- The Manson Family (2004)
- Manson Family Vacation (2015)
- Manufactured Landscapes (2006)
- Manufacturing Consent: Noam Chomsky and the Media (1992)
- The Manxman (1929)
- The Many Adventures of Winnie the Pooh (1977)
- Many Rivers to Cross (1955)
- The Many Saints of Newark (2021)

==== Mao–Maq ====
- Mao Tse Tung (2007)
- Mao Zedong 1949 (2019)
- Mao's Last Dancer (2009)
- A Maori Maid's Love (1916)
- The Maori Merchant of Venice (2002)
- Map of the Human Heart (1993)
- The Map Reader (2008)
- Map of Salvation (2015)
- Map of the Sounds of Tokyo (2009)
- The Map of Tiny Perfect Things (2021)
- A Map of the World (1999)
- Mapado (2005)
- Mapado 2: Back to the Island (2007)
- Mapla Singam (2016)
- Maple Palm (2006)
- The Mapmaker (2012)
- Mappillai: (1989 & 2011)
- Mappillai Gounder (1997)
- Mappillai Manasu Poopola (1996)
- Mappillai Sir (1988)
- Mapplethorpe (2018)
- Mapplethorpe: Look at the Pictures (2016)
- Maps to the Stars (2014)
- Mapule's Choice (2008)
- Maquia: When the Promised Flower Blooms (2018)
- Maquilapolis (2006)

==== Mar ====
- Mar adentro (2004)
- Mar Chokka (2017)
- Mar Jawan Gur Khake (2010)
- El Mar La Mar (2017)
- Mar Yar Project (2014)
- Mara (2018)
- Mara Maru (1952)
- Mara Pappa Superhero (2021)
- Mara of the Wilderness (1965)
- Maracaibo (1958)
- Maradona (2018)
- Maradona, the Hand of God (2007)
- Maradona by Kusturica (2008)
- Maragatha Veenai (1986)
- Maragatham (1959)
- Marat/Sade (1967)
- The Marathon Family (1982)
- Marathon Man (1976)
- Marauders: (1986 & 2016)
- Marcel the Shell with Shoes On: (2010 & 2021)
- March Comes in like a Lion (2017)
- The March of Fools (1975)
- March of the Penguins (2005)
- March of Time: Inside Nazi Germany (1938)
- Marci X (2003)
- Marco Polo: (1962 & 2007 TV)
- Mardi Gras: (1943 & 1958)
- Mardi Gras Massacre (1978)
- Mardi Gras: Spring Break (2011)
- Il Mare (2000)
- Mare Nostrum: (1926 & 1948)
- Marebito (2005)
- Margaret: (2009 TV & 2011)
- Margaret's Museum (1995)
- Margarita with a Straw (2014)
- Margin Call (2011)
- Margot at the Wedding (2008)
- Marguerite: (2015 & 2017)
- Maria Full of Grace (2004)
- María Candelaria (1944)
- El Mariachi (1992)
- Marian Anderson: the Lincoln Memorial Concert (1939)
- Marie Antoinette: (1938 & 2006)
- Marie-Chantal contre le docteur Kha (1965)
- Marie Stopes: Sexual Revolutionary (1970)
- Marihuana (1936)
- Marihuana (El monstruo verde) (1936)
- The Marihuana Story (1950)
- Marilyn Hotchkiss' Ballroom Dancing and Charm School (2005)
- The Marine series:
  - The Marine (2006)
  - The Marine 2 (2009)
  - The Marine 3: Homefront (2013)
  - The Marine 4: Moving Target (2015)
  - The Marine 5: Battleground (2017)
  - The Marine 6: Close Quarters (2018)
- Marine Boy (2009)
- The Marines Are Coming (1936)
- Mario: (1984 & 2018)
- Mario, Maria and Mario (1993)
- Marion Bridge (2002)
- Marius: (1931 & 2013)
- Marjoe (1972)
- Marjorie Morningstar (1958)
- Marjorie Prime (2017)
- The Mark: (1961 & 2012)
- Mark of the Devil: (1970 & 2020)
- Mark of the Vampire (1935)
- The Mark of Zorro: (1920, 1940 & 1974 TV)
- Marked for Death (1990)
- Marked Woman (1937)
- Marketa Lazarová (1967)
- The Marksman: (1953, 2005 & 2021)
- Marley (2012)
- Marley & Me (2008)
- Marley & Me: The Puppy Years (2011)
- Marlina the Murderer in Four Acts (2017)
- Marlowe: (1969 & 2022)
- Marmaduke (2010)
- Marmoulak (2004)
- Marnie (1964)
- Maroko (1990)
- Marooned: (1933, 1969 & 2004)
- The Marquise of O (1976)
- The Marriage Circle (1924)
- The Marriage of Figaro: (1920, 1949 & 1960 TV)
- Marriage Italian Style (1964)
- The Marriage of Maria Braun (1979)
- Marriage Story: (1992 & 2019)
- The Married Couple of the Year Two (1971)
- Married Life: (1921 & 2007)
- Married to the Mob (1988)
- Marrowbone (2017)
- Marry Me: (1925, 1932 & 2022)
- Marry Me! (1949)
- Mars: (1930, 1968 & 2004)
- Mars Attacks! (1996)
- Mars Needs Moms (2011)
- Mars Needs Women (1967) (TV)
- Mars: Tada, Kimi wo Aishiteru (2016)
- La Marseillaise (1938)
- Marshall (2017)
- Martha Marcy May Marlene (2011)
- Martha, Inc.: The Story of Martha Stewart (2003)
- Martha, Meet Frank, Daniel and Laurence (1998)
- Martial Club (1981)
- The Martian (2015)
- Martian Child (2007)
- Martian Through Georgia (1962)
- Martians Go Home (1990)
- Martin: (1978 & 1981)
- Martin Lawrence Live: Runteldat (2002)
- Marty (1955)
- Marty Supreme (2025)
- Martyrs: (2008 & 2015)
- Martín Fierro (1968)
- The Marvels (2023)
- Marvin's Room (1996)
- Marwencol (2010)
- Mary: (1931, 2005, 2019 & 2024)
- Mary from Beijing (1992)
- Mary Magdalene (2018)
- Mary and Max (2009)
- Mary Poppins (1964)
- Mary Poppins Returns (2018)
- Mary Queen of Scots: (2013 & 2018)
- Mary, Queen of Scots (1971)
- Mary, Queen of Tots (1925)
- Mary Reilly (1996)
- Mary of Scotland (1936)
- Mary Shelley (2017)
- Mary Shelley's Frankenstein (1994)
- Mary Stevens, M.D. (1933)
- Mary and the Witch's Flower (2017)
- Maryam: (1953, 2002 & 2021)

==== Mas ====
- Mas alla de los Gritos (1999)
- Masani (2013)
- Maschenka (1987)
- Maschera nera (1952)
- Maschiaccio (1917)
- Maschio latino cercasi (1977)
- Mascots: (1929 & 2016)
- Mascotte (1920)
- Masculin Féminin (1966)
- M*A*S*H (1970)
- Masha (2004)
- Mashaal (1984)
- Mashenka (1942)
- Mashooq (1992)
- Masikip sa Dibdib (2004)
- Mask: (1938, 1985 & 2019)
- The Mask: (1961 & 1994)
- Mask-A-Raid (1931)
- Mask of the Avenger (1951)
- Mask in Blue: (1943 & 1953)
- Mask of Desire (2000)
- The Mask of Diijon (1946)
- The Mask of Dimitrios (1944)
- Mask of the Dragon (1951)
- Mask of Dust (1954)
- The Mask of Fu Manchu (1932)
- Mask of Murder (1985)
- Mask of the Red Death (1969)
- The Mask of Zorro (1998)
- Maska: (2009 & 2020)
- Masked (1920)
- Masked and Anonymous (2003)
- Masked Avengers (1981)
- Masked Ball (1918)
- The Masked Man Against the Pirates (1964)
- The Masked Saint (2015)
- Masks: (1929 & 1987)
- The Masque of the Red Death: (1964 & 1989)
- Masquerade: (1929, 1941, 1965, 1988 & 2012)
- The Masquerader: (1914, 1922 & 1933)
- Mass: (2004 & 2021)
- Mass Appeal (1984)
- The Mass Is Ended (1985)
- The Massacre (1912)
- Massacre at Central High (1976)
- Massacre in Dinosaur Valley (1985)
- The Master: (1980, 1992, 2005, 2009, 2012 & 2015)
- A Master Builder (2013)
- Master and Commander: The Far Side of the World (2003)
- Master with Cracked Fingers (1979)
- The Master of Disguise (2002)
- Master of the Flying Guillotine (1976)
- Master Gardener (2022)
- The Master Gunfighter (1975)
- Master Hands (1936)
- Master of the House (1925)
- The Master Mind (1914)
- Master of the World (1961)
- Mastermind (1976)
- Masterminds: (1997, 2013 & 2016)
- Masters of the Universe: (1987 & 2026)
- Masti (2004)

==== Mat ====
- Mata: (1942 & 2006)
- Mata Hari: (1927, 1931 & 1985)
- Mata Hari, Agent H21 (1964)
- Mata Hari's Daughter (1954)
- Matador (1986)
- The Matador (2006)
- Matana MiShamayim (2003)
- Matango (1963)
- Matariki (2010)
- Matataki (2010)
- The Match Factory Girl (1990)
- Match Point (2005)
- Matchbox: (2002 & 2017)
- Matching Dreams (1916)
- Matching Jack (2010)
- Matchless (1967)
- The Matchmaker: (1958, 1997 & 2018)
- Matchstick Men (2003)
- Mate (2019)
- Mate Bohu Kari Nei Jaa (2011)
- Mate Ta Love Helare (2008)
- Mated in the Wilds (1921)
- Mateo: (1937 & 2014)
- Mater dei (1950)
- Mater and the Ghostlight (2006)
- Material (2012)
- Material Girls (2006)
- Materialists (2025)
- Maternal Secrets (2018)
- Maternity (1917)
- Mates (1999)
- Mates and Models (1919)
- Mates from the Murrumbidgee (1911)
- Matewan (1987)
- Matha (2012)
- Mathadana (2001)
- Mathai Kuzhappakkaranalla (2014)
- Mathapoo (2013)
- Mathar Kula Manikkam (1956)
- Matilda: (1978, 1996, 2017 & 2022)
- Matinee (1993)
- The Mating Habits of the Earthbound Human (1999)
- The Matrix series:
  - The Matrix (1999)
  - The Matrix Reloaded (2003)
  - The Matrix Revolutions (2003)
  - The Matrix Resurrections (2021)
- Matru Ki Bijlee Ka Mandola (2013)
- The Mattei Affair (1972)
- A Matter of Life and Death (1946)
- A Matter of Time (1976)
- Matthias & Maxime (2019)

==== Mau–Mav ====
- Mau Mau Maria (2014)
- Mau: The Spirit Dreams of Cheraw (2023)
- Maud Rockefeller's Bet (1924)
- Maudie (2016)
- Maudite soit la guerre (1914)
- Maujaan Dubai Diyaan (1985)
- Maujaan Hi Maujaan (2023)
- Mauji Jeevan (1944)
- Mauli (2018)
- Mauna Kea: Temple Under Siege (2005)
- Maundy Thursday (2006)
- Maung Doe Cherry Myay (1963)
- Maung Mu Paing Shin (1964)
- Maung Mu Paing Shin (2000)
- Mauprat (1926)
- Mauri (1988)
- Maurice (1987)
- Maurice (2015)
- Maurie (1973)
- Maurin of the Moors (1932)
- The Mauritanian (2021)
- Mausam (1975)
- Mausam (2011)
- Mausam Ikrar Ke Do Pal Pyar Ke (2018)
- Mausoleum (1983)
- Mauvaise Graine (1934)
- Mava Mava Maduve Mado (2000)
- Mavana Magalu (1965)
- Maverick (1994)
- Mavis! (2016)
- Mavka: The Forest Song (2023)

==== Max ====
- Max: (1994, 2002 & 2015)
- Max, 13 (1999)
- Max 2: White House Hero (2017)
- Max & Co (2007)
- Max Dugan Returns (1983)
- Max Embarrassing 2 (2011)
- Max Havelaar (1976)
- Max Havoc: Curse of the Dragon (2005)
- Max Havoc: Ring of Fire (2006)
- Max Headroom: 20 Minutes into the Future (1985 TV)
- Max and Helen (1990)
- Max Hell Frog Warrior (1996)
- Max and His Mother-in-Law (1911)
- Max et Jérémie (1992)
- Max et les ferrailleurs (1971)
- Max Keeble's Big Move (2001)
- Max Knight: Ultra Spy (2000)
- Max mon amour (1986)
- Max and Moritz (1956)
- Max Payne (2008)
- Max the Pickpocket (1962)
- Max Rose (2013)
- Max Steel (2016)
- Maxie: (1954 & 1985)
- Maxime (1958)
- Maxime, McDuff & McDo (2002)
- Maximum (2012)
- Maximum Conviction (2012)
- Maximum Impact (2017)
- Maximum Overdrive (1986)
- Maximum Ride (2016)
- Maximum Risk (1996)
- Maximum Shame (2010)
- Maxwell (2007)
- MaXXXine (2024)

==== May–Maz ====
- May (2002)
- May 18 (2007)
- May Allah Bless France! (2014)
- May December (TBD)
- May the Devil Take You (2018)
- May the Devil Take You Too (2020)
- May Fools (1990)
- May God Bless America (2006)
- May God Forgive Me (1948)
- May God Forgive You... But I Won't (1968)
- May God Save Us (2016)
- May I Borrow Your Girl Tonight? (1978)
- May Maadham (1994)
- May Minamahal (1993)
- May Morning (1970)
- May Nagmamahal Sa'yo (1996)
- May Nights (1952)
- May Who? (2015)
- Maya: (1961, 1966, 1999, 2001, 2015 Pakistani, 2015 Tamil & 2018)
- Maya: The Lost Mother (2019)
- Maya 3D (2016)
- Maya the Bee (2014)
- Maya the Bee: The Golden Orb (2021)
- Maya the Bee: The Honey Games (2018)
- Maya Dardel (2017)
- Maya Darpan (1972)
- Maya Kannadi: (2007 & 2020)
- Maya Lin: A Strong Clear Vision (1994)
- Maya Manithan (1958)
- Maya Maschindra (1975)
- Maya Mayavan (1938)
- Maya Mayooram (1993)
- Maya Memsaab (1993)
- Maya Miriga (1984)
- Maya Nagari (1944)
- Maya of the Seven Veils (1951)
- Mayabazar: (1936, 1957, 1995 & 2006)
- Mayabazar 2016 (2020)
- Mayabini (1992)
- Mayak (2006)
- Mayakkam Enna (2011)
- Mayalamari (1951)
- Mayalodu (1993)
- Mayalokam (1945)
- Mayamohini (2012)
- Mayan Renaissance (2012)
- Mayanadi (2017)
- Mayandi Kudumbathar (2009)
- Mayanginen Thayanginen (2012)
- Mayangukiral Oru Maadhu (1975)
- Mayani Mamata (1970)
- Mayaponman (1997)
- Mayar Badhon (1997)
- Mayavathi (1949)
- Mayavi: (1965 & 2007)
- Maybe Baby (2001)
- Maybe I Should Have (2010)
- Maybe I'll Come Home in the Spring (1971 TV)
- Maybe It's Love: (1930 & 1935)
- Maybe a Love Story (2018)
- Maybe This Time: (1980 & 2014)
- Maybe Tomorrow (2012)
- Mayblossom (1917)
- Mayday: (2005, 2021 & 2026)
- Mayday at 40,000 Feet! (1976 TV)
- Mayerling: (1936, 1957 TV & 1968)
- Mayeya Musuku (1980)
- Mayfair (2018)
- Mayfly (2008)
- Mayhem (2017)
- Mayor (2020)
- The Mayor: (1997 & 2017)
- The Mayor of Casterbridge: (1921 & 2003 TV)
- The Mayor of Hell (1933)
- The Mayor of Rione Sanità (2019)
- Mayrig (1992)
- Maytime: (1923, 1926 & 1937)
- Maza Agadbam (2018)
- Maza Pati Karodpati (1988)
- Mazaa Mazaa (2005)
- Mazaaq (1975)
- Mazdoor (1983)
- Mazdoor Zindabaad (1976)
- Maze: (2000 & 2017)
- The Maze: (1953 & 2010)
- Maze Runner series:
  - The Maze Runner (2014)
  - Maze Runner: The Scorch Trials (2015)
  - Maze Runner: The Death Cure (2018)
- Maze: Secret Love (2015)
- Mazeppa: (1909 & 1993)
- Mazes and Monsters (1982 TV)
- Mazha (2000)
- Mazha Nilaavu (1983)
- Mazha Peyyunnu Maddalam Kottunnu (1986)
- Mazhai (2005)
- Mazhakaaru (1973)
- Mazhanool Kanav (2003)
- Mazhathullikkilukkam (2002)
- Mazhavilkavadi (1989)
- Mazhavilkoodaram (1995)
- Mazhavillinattam Vare (2012)
- Mazhavillu (1999)
- Mazhayathu (2018)
- Mazhayethum Munpe (1995)
- Mazhu (1982)
- Mazloom (1986)
- Mazurka (1935)

=== Mb–Mc ===
- MBA Partners (2016)
- McBain (1991)
- McCabe & Mrs. Miller (1971)
- McDull, The Alumni (2006)
- McDull: Me & My Mum (2014)
- McDull: Rise of the Rice Cooker (2016)
- McFarland, USA (2015)
- McHale's Navy: (1964 & 1997)
- McHale's Navy Joins the Air Force (1965)
- The McKenzie Break (1970)
- McLintock! (1963)
- The McPherson Tape (1989)
- McQ (1974)
- McVicar (1980)

=== Me ===
- Me... Myself (2007)
- Me Before You (2016)
- Me and the Big Guy (1999)
- Me and Bobby Fischer (2009)
- Me and Her (2006)
- Me and Marlborough (1935)
- Me Myself I (2000)
- Me and Orson Welles (2009)
- Me Time (2022)
- Me Without You (2001)
- Me and You (2012)
- Me and You and Everyone We Know (2005)
- Me You Them (2000)
- Me, Myself & Irene (2000)

==== Mea–Med ====
- Mea Culpa (2014)
- Mea Culpa (2024)
- Mea Maxima Culpa: Silence in the House of God (2012)
- Meadowland (2015)
- Mean Creek (2004)
- Mean Dog Blues (1978)
- Mean Dreams (2016)
- Mean Frank and Crazy Tony (1973)
- Mean Girls: (2004 & 2024)
- Mean Girls 2 (2011 TV)
- Mean Guns (1997)
- Mean Johnny Barrows (1976)
- Mean Machine (2001)
- The Mean One (2022)
- Mean People Suck (2001)
- The Mean Season (1985)
- Mean Streak (2024)
- Mean Streets (1973)
- Mean Tricks (1992)
- Meander (2020)
- Meant to Beh (2017)
- Meantime (1983)
- Meanwhile: (1998, 2011 & 2024)
- Meanwhile on Earth (2024)
- Measure of a Man (2018)
- Measure for Measure (1943)
- Measure for Measure (2019)
- Measure of Revenge (2022)
- Measures for a Funeral (2024)
- Measures of Men (2023)
- Measuring the World (2012)
- Meat (1976)
- Meat the Future (2020)
- Meat Grinder (2009)
- Meat Loaf: In Search of Paradise (2007)
- Meat Love (1989)
- Meat Market (2000)
- Meat Market 2 (2001)
- Meat Weed Madness (2006)
- Meatball Machine (2005)
- Meatballs series:
  - Meatballs (1979)
  - Meatballs 2 (1984)
  - Meatballs III: Summer Job (1986)
  - Meatballs 4 (1992)
- Meatcleaver Massacre (1977)
- Meatless Flyday (1944)
- Meatless Tuesday (1943)
- The Mechanic series:
  - The Mechanic: (1972 & 2011)
  - Mechanic: Resurrection (2016)
- Mechanic Alludu (1993)
- Mechanical Suite (2001)
- Mechanics of the Brain (1926)
- Med dej i mina armar (1940)
- Med glorian på sned (1957)
- Med kærlig hilsen (1971)
- Med Maud over Polhavet (1926)
- Meda Meeda Abbayi (2017)
- Meda or the Not So Bright Side of Things (2017)
- Medal for the General (1944)
- Medal of Honor (2009)
- The Medallion (2003)
- The Meddler (2015)
- Meddling Women (1924)
- Medea: (1959, 1969, 1988, 2017 & 2021)
- Medea Miracle (2007)
- Medeni mjesec (1983)
- Medicine Man (1992)
- Medicine for Melancholy (2008)
- Medieval (2022)
- Medio millón por una mujer (1940)
- The Medium: (1921, 1951, 1992 & 2021)
- Medium Cool (1969)
- Mediterraneo (1991)
- Medulla Oblongata (2014)
- Medusa (1973)
- Medusa Challenger (1977)
- The Medusa Touch (1978)
- Medusa: Dare to Be Truthful (1991)

==== Mee–Mem ====
- Mee Aayana Jagratha (1998)
- Mee Loaybakee (2017)
- Mee Pok Man (1995)
- Mee Raqsam (2020)
- Mee Sindhutai Sapkal (2010)
- Mee-Shee: The Water Giant (2005)
- Meek's Cutoff (2011)
- Meeku Maathrame Cheptha (2019)
- Meeku Meere Maaku Meme (2016)
- Meel Patthar (2020)
- Meelo Evaru Koteeswardu (2016)
- Meen Kuzhambum Mann Paanaiyum (2016)
- Meena (2014)
- Meenakshi Kalyanam (1998)
- Meenakshi Thiruvilayadal (1989)
- Meenamasathile Sooryan (1986)
- Meenathil Thalikettu (1998)
- Meenava Nanban (1977)
- Meenaxi: A Tale of Three Cities (2004)
- Meenda Sorgam (1960)
- Meendum Kokila (1981)
- Meendum Oru Kaathal Kathai (1985)
- Meendum Oru Kadhal Kadhai (2016)
- Meet the Applegates (1990)
- Meet Bill (2007)
- Meet the Browns (2008)
- Meet Dave (2008)
- Meet the Deedles (1998)
- Meet the Feebles (1989)
- Meet the Fockers (2005)
- Meet the Hollowheads (1989)
- Meet the Missus: (1937 & 1940)
- Meet Joe Black (1998)
- Meet John Doe (1941)
- Meet Me in St. Louis (1944)
- Meet Miss Anxiety (2014)
- Meet the Parents (2000)
- Meet the Robinsons (2007)
- Meet the Spartans (2008)
- The Meg (2018)
- Meg 2: The Trench (2023)
- Meg the Lady (1916)
- Mega Mendoeng (1942)
- Mega Piranha (2010)
- Mega Python vs. Gatoroid (2011)
- Mega Shark series:
  - Mega Shark Versus Giant Octopus (2009)
  - Mega Shark Versus Crocosaurus (2010)
  - Mega Shark Versus Mecha Shark (2014)
  - Mega Shark Versus Kolossus (2015)
- Mega Snake (2007)
- Megachurch Murder (2015 TV)
- Megaforce (1982)
- Megalopolis (2024)
- Megam Karuththirukku (1987)
- Megamind (2010)
- Megan: (2018 & 2023)
- Megan Is Missing (2011)
- Megane (2007)
- Megh Roddur (2013)
- Megh o Roudra (1969)
- Meghe Dhaka Tara (1960)
- Megiddo: The Omega Code 2 (2001)
- Mehed ei nuta (1968)
- Mehndi (1998)
- Mekhong Full Moon Party (2002)
- Melancholia: (2008 & 2011)
- Melania (2026)
- Melinda and Melinda (2004)
- Mélo (1986)
- Melody: (1953, 1971 & 2014)
- Melody Lane: (1929 & 1941)
- Melody and Moonlight (1940)
- Melody Ranch (1940)
- Melody and Romance (1937)
- Melody Time (1948)
- Melvin and Howard (1980)
- The Member of the Wedding (1952)
- Meme (2018)
- Memento (2000)
- Memento Mori (1999)
- Memoir of a Snail (2024)
- Memoir Seorang Guru (2024)
- Memoirs of a Geisha (2005)
- Memoirs of an Invisible Man (1992)
- Mémorable (2019)
- Memoria: (2015 & 2021)
- Memories: (1995, 2013 & 2014)
- Memories of Matsuko (2006)
- Memories of Murder (1990) (TV)
- Memories of Murder (2003)
- Memories of a River (1990)
- Memories of Underdevelopment (1968)
- Memory: (2006, 2008 & 2022)
- Memory House (2020)
- The Memory of Justice (1976)
- The Memory of a Killer (2005)
- Memory Lane: (1926 & 2012)
- Memory: The Origins of Alien (2019)
- Memphis Belle (1990)
- The Memphis Belle: A Story of a Flying Fortress (1944)
- Memron (2004)

==== Men–Mez ====
- Men: (1918, 1924, 1997 & 2022)
- The Men: (1950 & 1971)
- Men Against the Sky (1940)
- Men Behind the Sun (1987)
- Men in Black series:
  - Men in Black (1997)
  - Men in Black II (2002)
  - Men in Black 3 (2012)
  - Men in Black: International (2019)
- Men Boxing (1891)
- Men with Brooms (2002)
- Men & Chicken (2015)
- Men of Honor (2000)
- Men Must Fight (1933)
- Men of the Sky: (1931 & 1942)
- Men O' War (1929)
- The Men Who Stare at Goats (2009)
- The Men Who Tread on the Tiger's Tail (1952)
- Men and Women: (1964 & 1999)
- Men at Work: (1990 & 2006)
- Menace II Society (1993)
- Menace from Outer Space (1956)
- Ménage (1986)
- Menashe (2017)
- The Menu: (2016 & 2022)
- Mephisto: (1931 & 1981)
- The Mephisto Waltz (1971)
- La Mer (1895)
- Mera Naam Joker (1970)
- The Mercenary (1968)
- Mercenary for Justice (2006)
- The Merchant of Four Seasons (1971)
- The Merchant of Venice: (1914, 1916, 1923, 1953, 1961, 1969 & 2004)
- Merci Docteur Rey (2002)
- Merci pour le Chocolat (2000)
- Mercury Man (2006)
- Mercury Rising (1998)
- Mercy: (1953, 1995, 2000, 2009, 2014, 2016 & 2026)
- The Mercy (2017)
- The Mercy of the Jungle (2018)
- Merlin: (1998 & 2018)
- Merlin's Shop of Mystical Wonders (1996)
- The Mermaid: (1910, 1965 & 2016)
- Mermaid: (1996, 2000, 2007 & 2026)
- Mermaid Legend (1984)
- Mermaids: (1990 & 2003 TV)
- Mermaids: The Body Found (2012)
- Mermaid's Scar (1993) (OVA)
- Merrily We Live (1938)
- Merrily We Roll Along (TBD)
- Merry Andrew (1958)
- Merry Christmas: (2000 & 2001)
- Merry Christmas, Drake & Josh (2008)
- Merry Christmas, Mr. Lawrence (1983)
- The Merry Frolics of Satan (1906)
- The Merry Gentleman (2009)
- The Merry Widow: (1918, 1925, 1934, 1952 & 1961)
- The Merry Wives (1938)
- The Merry Wives of Tyrol (1964)
- The Merry Wives of Vienna (1931)
- The Merry Wives of Windsor: (1910, 1918, 1950 & 1965)
- Merry-Go-Round: (1923, 1956, 1981, 2010 & 2017)
- Mesa of Lost Women (1953)
- Meshes of the Afternoon (1943)
- Mesmer (1994)
- Mesrine: (1984 & 2008)
- The Message: (1976 & 2009)
- Message in a Bottle (1999)
- Message from the King (2016)
- A Message to Garcia (1936)
- Messalina: (1924, 1951 & 1960)
- Messalina vs. the Son of Hercules (1964)
- The Messenger: (1918, 1937, 2008, 2009, 2015 British & 2015 Canadian)
- The Messenger: The Story of Joan of Arc (1999)
- The Messengers (2007)
- Messengers 2: The Scarecrow (2009)
- The Messiah: (1975 & 2007)
- Messiah of Evil (1973)
- Metal: A Headbanger's Journey (2005)
- Metallic Blues (2004)
- Metallica: Some Kind of Monster (2003)
- Metallica Through the Never (2013)
- Metalstorm: The Destruction of Jared-Syn (1983)
- Meteor (1979)
- The Meteor Man (1993)
- The Method (2005)
- Metro: (1997, 2013 & 2016)
- The Metro (2011)
- Metro Manila (2013)
- Metroland (1997)
- Metronome (2002)
- Metropolis: (1927 & 2001)
- Metropolitan: (1935 & 1990)
- Metrosexual (2006)
- Mexicali Shmoes (1959)
- The Mexican (2001)
- Mexican Bus Ride (1952)
- Meyaadha Maan (2017)
- Meyer from Berlin (1919)
- The Meyerowitz Stories (2017)
- Meyeti Ekhon Kothay Jabe (2017)
- Mezi námi zloději (1963)
- Mezzanotte (1915)

=== Mi ===
==== Mia–Mid ====
- Mia and the Migoo (2008)
- Mia moglie torna a scuola (1981)
- Mia moglie è una strega (1980)
- Mia nonna poliziotto (1958)
- Mia and the White Lion (2018)
- Miami: (1924 & 2017)
- Miami Beach (2016)
- Miami Blues (1990)
- Miami Connection (1988)
- Miami Exposé (1956)
- Miami Rhapsody (1995)
- The Miami Story (1954)
- Miami Supercops (1985)
- Miami Vice (2006)
- Miarka: (1920 & 1937)
- Mice Follies (1960)
- Mice and Men (1916)
- Michael: (1924, 1996, 2011 Austrian, 2011 Indian & 2026)
- Michael the Brave (1971)
- Michael Clayton (2007)
- Michael Collins (1996)
- Michael Jackson's This Is It (2009)
- Michael Jordan: An American Hero (1999 TV)
- Michael Jordan to the Max (2000)
- Michael Landon, the Father I Knew (1999 TV)
- Michael Lucas' La Dolce Vita (2006)
- Michael & Me (2004)
- Michael Moore Hates America (2004)
- Miche (1932)
- Michel Strogoff: (1926, 1936 & 1956)
- Michel Vaillant (2003)
- The Michelle Apartments (1995)
- Michiel de Ruyter (2015)
- The Michigan Kid: (1928 & 1947)
- Michurin (1948)
- Mickey: (1918, 1948 & 2004)
- Mickey 17 (2025)
- Mickey and the Bear (2019)
- Mickey Blue Eyes (1999)
- Mickey Matson and the Copperhead Conspiracy (2012)
- Mickey One (1965)
- Mickey's series:
  - Mickey's Christmas Carol (1983)
  - Mickey's House of Villains (2002)
  - Mickey's Magical Christmas: Snowed in at the House of Mouse (2001)
  - Mickey's Once Upon a Christmas (1999) (TV)
  - Mickey's Polo Team (1936)
  - Mickey's Trailer (1938)
  - Mickey's Twice Upon a Christmas (2004)
  - Mickey, Donald, Goofy: The Three Musketeers (2004)
- Micki & Maude (1984)
- Mickybo and Me (2004)
- Micmacs (2009)
- The Microbe (1919)
- Microbe & Gasoline (2015)
- Microcosmos (1996)
- Microhabitat (2017)
- Microphone (2010)
- Microwave Massacre (1979)
- Mid-Afternoon Barks (2007)
- Mid-July Days (2015)
- Mid-July Days 2 (2016)
- Mid90s (2018)
- The Midas Touch: (1940, 1997 & 2013)
- Middle Age Crazy (1980)
- MiddleMen (2009)
- The Middle Watch: (1930 & 1940)
- The Middle of the World: (1974 & 2003)
- The Middleton Family at the New York World's Fair (1939)
- Midnight: (1918, 1922, 1931, 1934, 1939, 1949, 1982, 1989, 1998 & 2021)
- The Midnight Adventure (1928)
- The Midnight After (2014)
- The Midnight Alarm (1923)
- The Midnight Cabaret (1923)
- A Midnight Clear (1992)
- Midnight Club (1933)
- Midnight Cowboy (1969)
- The Midnight Drives (2007)
- Midnight Express (1978)
- The Midnight Express (1924)
- The Midnight Flyer (1918)
- The Midnight Game (2013)
- Midnight Garage (2014)
- The Midnight Ghost (1940)
- The Midnight Girl (1925)
- The Midnight Guest (1923)
- Midnight Hair (2014)
- The Midnight Hour (1985 TV)
- Midnight in the Garden of Good and Evil (1997)
- The Midnight Kiss (1926)
- Midnight Lace (1960)
- The Midnight Lady (1932)
- Midnight Madness (1980)
- Midnight Man (1995)
- The Midnight Man: (1917, 1919, 1974, 2016 crime & 2016 horror)
- The Midnight Meat Train (2008)
- The Midnight Message (1926)
- Midnight Movie (2009)
- Midnight My Love (2005)
- Midnight in Paris (2011)
- Midnight Rider (unreleased)
- Midnight Run (1988)
- The Midnight Sky (2020)
- The Midnight Story (1957)
- The Midnight Swim (2014)
- Midnight in the Switchgrass (2021)
- Midnight Whisper (2015)
- Midsommar (2019)
- Midsommer (2003)
- Midsummer Dream (2005)
- A Midsummer Night's Dream: (1909, 1935, 1959, 1968, 1999, 2016 & 2017)
- A Midsummer Night's Sex Comedy (1982)
- Midway: (1976 & 2019)
- A Midwinter's Tale (1995)

==== Mif–Mim ====
- Mifune (1999)
- Mifune: The Last Samurai (2015)
- The Mighty (1998)
- Mighty Aphrodite (1995)
- The Mighty Celt (2005)
- The Mighty Ducks series:
  - The Mighty Ducks (1992)
  - D2: The Mighty Ducks (1994)
  - D3: The Mighty Ducks (1996)
- A Mighty Heart (2007)
- Mighty Joe Young: (1949 & 1998)
- Mighty Like a Moose (1926)
- Mighty Morphin Power Rangers: The Movie (1995)
- A Mighty Wind (2003)
- The Mikado: (1939 & 1967)
- Mike Bassett: England Manager (2001)
- Mike and Dave Need Wedding Dates (2015)
- Mike & Nick & Nick & Alice (2026)
- Mike Wallace Is Here (2019)
- Mike's New Car (2002)
- Mikey (1992)
- Mikey and Nicky (1976)
- Mil Mascaras vs. the Aztec Mummy (2007)
- Milae (2002)
- The Milagro Beanfield War (1988)
- Milan: (1946, 1967, 1995 & 2004)
- Milano calibro 9 (1972)
- Mildred Pierce (1945)
- Mile Zero (2001)
- Miles of Fire (1957)
- Miley: The Movement (2013)
- Mili: (1975 & 2015)
- Milk: (2008 American, 2008 Turkish, 2017 & 2021)
- Milk Money (1994)
- Milka – A Film About Taboos (1980)
- The Milker's Mishap (1897)
- The Milky Way: (1936, 1940 & 1969)
- Milky Way Liberation Front (2007)
- The Mill and the Cross (2011)
- The Mill on the Floss (1936)
- Mill of the Stone Women (1960)
- Millennium (1989)
- Millennium Actress (2001)
- Millennium Mambo (2001)
- The Miller and the Sweep (1898)
- Miller's Crossing (1990)
- Miller's Girl (2024)
- Le Million (1931)
- Million Dollar Arm (2014)
- Million Dollar Baby: (1941 & 2004)
- The Million Dollar Hotel (2000)
- Million Dollar Mermaid (1952)
- Million Dollar Mystery (1927)
- Million Dollar Mystery (1987)
- The Million Eyes of Sumuru (1967)
- A Million Little Pieces (2018)
- The Million Ryo Pot (1935)
- A Million Ways to Die in the West (2014)
- The Millionaire: (1917, 1921, 1927, 1931, 1947 & 1950)
- Millionaires Express (1986)
- Millions: (1937 & 2004)
- Milou in May (1990)
- The Mimic: (2017 & 2020)
- Mimic series:
  - Mimic (1997)
  - Mimic 2 (2001)
  - Mimic 3: Sentinel (2003)

==== Min–Mix ====
- Min & Max (2016)
- Min and Bill (1930)
- Mina Kiá (2017)
- Mina olin siin (2008)
- Minari (2020)
- Mind Game (2004)
- Mind Twister (1994)
- Mindhunters (2004)
- Minding the Gap (2018)
- A Minecraft Movie (2025)
- Minghags: The Movie (2009)
- Mini's First Time (2006)
- Minions series:
  - Minions (2015)
  - Minions: The Rise of Gru (2022)
  - Minions & Monsters (2026)
- Ministry of Fear (1944)
- The Ministry of Ungentlemanly Warfare (2024)
- The Miniver Story (1950)
- Minnale (2001)
- Minnalppadayaali (1959)
- Minnesota Clay (1965)
- Minnie and Moskowitz (1972)
- Minority Report (2002)
- Minotaur (2006)
- Minotaur, the Wild Beast of Crete (1960)
- Minsaara Kanavu (1997)
- Minshū no Teki (1946)
- The Minus Man (1999)
- A Minute to Pray, a Second to Die (1968)
- The Minute You Wake Up Dead (2022)
- Mio in the Land of Faraway (1987)
- Miracle: (1982 & 2004)
- The Miracle: (1912 German, 1912 UK, 1913, 1959, 1987, 1991, 2009, 2013 & 2015)
- Miracle: Letters to the President (2021)
- Miracle on 1st Street (2007)
- Miracle on 34th Street: (1947 & 1994)
- The Miracle of the Bells (1948)
- The Miracle of Bern (2003)
- Miracle on Ice (1981)
- The Miracle of Joe Petrel (1984)
- Miracle in Lane 2 (2000 TV)
- The Miracle Man: (1919 & 1932)
- The Miracle Match (2005)
- Miracle in Milan (1951)
- Miracle Mile (1988)
- The Miracle of Morgan's Creek (1943)
- The Miracle of Our Lady of Fatima (1952)
- The Miracle Season (2018)
- Miracle at St. Anna (2008)
- The Miracle Worker: (1962, 1979 & 2000)
- Miracles: (1986 & 1989)
- Miracles from Heaven (2016)
- Mirage: (1965, 1972, 1995, 2004 & 2014)
- The Mirage: (1920 & 2015)
- Mirai (2018)
- Miranda: (1948, 1985 & 2002)
- Miranda's Victim (2023)
- Mirch Masala (1985)
- Mirror (1975)
- The Mirror: (1913, 1915, 1917, 1943, 1967, 1999, 2014 & 2015)
- The Mirror Crack'd (1980)
- The Mirror Has Two Faces (1996)
- Mirror Mirror (2012)
- Mirror, Mirror (1990)
- MirrorMask (2005)
- Mirrors: (1978, 2007 & 2008)
- Mirzya (2016)
- Misbegotten (1997)
- Mischief: (1931 & 1985)
- Mischief Night: (2006, 2013 & 2014)
- Mise Éire (1959)
- The MisEducation of Bindu (2019)
- The Miseducation of Cameron Post (2018)
- The Miser: (1908 & 1990)
- Les Misérables: (1909, 1917, 1925, 1934, 1935, 1948, 1952, 1958, 1978, 1982, 1995, 1998 & 2012)
- Misery (1990)
- The Misfits: (1961, 2011 & 2021)
- Misha and the Wolves (2021)
- Mishima: A Life in Four Chapters (1995)
- Miss America (2002)
- Miss Americana (2020)
- Miss Bala: (2011 & 2019)
- Miss Congeniality (2000)
- Miss Congeniality 2: Armed and Fabulous (2005)
- Miss Gold Digger (2007)
- Miss Jerry (1894)
- Miss Julie: (1951, 1999 & 2014)
- Miss Juneteenth (2020)
- Miss Lovely (2012)
- Miss Lulu Bett (1922)
- Miss March (2009)
- Miss Meadows (2014)
- Miss Mend (1926)
- Miss Peregrine's Home for Peculiar Children (2016)
- Miss Pettigrew Lives for a Day (2008)
- Miss Potter (2006)
- Miss Sloane (2016)
- Miss Stevens (2016)
- Miss Suwanna of Siam (1923)
- Miss You Already (2015)
- Missile to the Moon (1958)
- Missing: (1918, 1982, 2008, 2016, 2018 & 2023)
- The Missing: (1999, 2003, 2017 & 2020)
- Missing in Action (1984)
- Missing in Action 2: The Beginning (1985)
- Missing in America (2005)
- Missing Link (2019)
- The Missing Link: (1927 & 1980)
- The Missing Links (1916)
- The Missing Person (2009)
- The Missing Picture (2013)
- The Missing Piece (2015)
- Missing You: (2008 & 2016)
- The Mission: (1983, 1986 & 1999)
- Mission to Mars (2000)
- Mission Stardust (1967)
- Mission: Impossible series:
  - Mission: Impossible (1996)
  - Mission: Impossible 2 (2000)
  - Mission: Impossible III (2006)
  - Mission: Impossible – Ghost Protocol (2011)
  - Mission: Impossible – Rogue Nation (2015)
  - Mission: Impossible – Fallout (2018)
  - Mission: Impossible – Dead Reckoning Part One (2023)
  - Mission: Impossible – The Final Reckoning (2025)
- Mission Milano (2016)
- Mission: Possible (2021)
- The Missionary (1982)
- Missionary (2013)
- Mississippi Burning (1988)
- Mississippi Gambler (1942)
- The Mississippi Gambler: (1929 & 1953)
- Mississippi Grind (2015)
- Mississippi Masala (1991)
- Mississippi Mermaid (1969)
- The Missouri Breaks (1976)
- The Mist (2007)
- Mister (2017)
- Mister 880 (1950)
- Mister Bug Goes to Town (1941)
- Mister Felicità (2017)
- Mister Quilp (1975)
- Mister Roberts: (1955 & 1984 TV)
- Misteryo sa Tuwa (1984)
- Les Mistons (1957)
- Mistress: (1987 TV & 1992)
- The Mistress: (1927, 1962 & 2012)
- Mistress America (2015)
- The Mistress of Spices (2005)
- The Mistress of Treves (1952)
- Misty (1961)
- Misty Green (2026)
- Mitchell (1975)
- The Mitchells vs. the Machines (2021)
- Mixed Nuts (1994)
- Mixtape (2021)

=== Mo ===
- Mo: (2010 TV & 2016)
- Mo Dil To Deewana (2013)
- Mo Duniya Tu Hi Tu (2013)
- Mo' Better Blues (1990)
- Mo' Money (1992)

==== Moa–Mol ====
- Moan and Groan, Inc. (1929)
- Moana: (1926, 2016 & 2026)
- Moana 2 (2024)
- Mob Boss (1990)
- Mob Land (2023)
- Mob Queen (1998)
- Mob Sister (2005)
- Mob Story (1989)
- Mob Town: (1941 & 2019)
- Mobile Home (2012)
- Mobile Homes (2017)
- Mobsters (1991)
- Moby Dick: (1930, 1956, 1978 & 2010)
- Moby Doc (2021)
- Mock Up on Mu (2008)
- Mockery: (1912 & 1927)
- Mockingbird (2014)
- Mockingbird Don't Sing (2001)
- Mod (2011)
- The Mod Squad (1999)
- Modada Mareyalli (1991)
- Model Behavior (2000 TV)
- Model Shop (1969)
- Modern Boy (2008)
- Modern Girls (1986)
- Modern Life Is Rubbish (2017)
- Modern Love: (1918, 1929, 1990 & 2006)
- A Modern Marriage (1950)
- A Modern Monte Cristo (1917)
- A Modern Musketeer (1917)
- Modern Problems (1981)
- Modern Romance (1981)
- Modern Times (1936)
- A Modern Twain Story: The Prince and the Pauper (2007)
- Modern Vampires (1998)
- Modesta (1956)
- Modesty Blaise: (1966 & 1982)
- Modigliani (2004)
- Moebius: (1996 & 2013)
- Moffie (2019)
- Mogacho Anvddo (1950)
- Mogadischu (2008 TV)
- Mogam Muppadhu Varusham (1976)
- Mogambo (1953)
- Mogliamante (1977)
- Mogra Phulaalaa (2019)
- Moguds Pellams (2005)
- Mogudu (2011)
- Mogudu Kaavali (1980)
- Mogudu Pellam O Dongodu (2005)
- The Moguls (2005)
- Mohabbatein (2000)
- Mohammad, Messenger of God (1976)
- Mojados: Through the Night (2004)
- Mojin: The Lost Legend (2015)
- Mojin: The Worm Valley (2018)
- Mokhtar (2010)
- Molasses (2010)
- Mold (2012)
- The Mole Agent (2020)
- Mole Men Against the Son of Hercules (1961)
- The Mole People (1956)
- Molière: (1978 & 2007)
- Moll Flanders (1996)
- Molli and Max in the Future (2023)
- Molly: An American Girl on the Home Front (2006 TV)
- Molly & Gina (1994)
- Molly and Lawless John (1972)
- The Molly Maguires (1970)
- Molly and Me: (1929 & 1945)
- Molly Moon and the Incredible Book of Hypnotism (2015)
- Molly's Game (2017)
- Molly's Pilgrim (1985)
- Moloch: (1999 & 2022)

==== Mom ====
- Mom (2017)
- Mom and Dad: (1945 & 2017)
- Mom and Dad Save the World (1992)
- Mom and Other Loonies in the Family (2015)
- Mom and the Red Bean Cake (2010)
- Mom at Sixteen (2005)
- Mom Thinks I'm Crazy to Marry a Japanese Guy (2017)
- Mom's Got a Date with a Vampire (2000) (TV)
- Mom's Outta Sight (1998)
- Mom's on Strike (2002)
- Mome Ki Gudiya (1972)
- Moment (1978)
- The Moment: (1979, 2013 & 2026)
- Moment of Danger (1960)
- Moment of Impact (1998)
- Moment of Indiscretion (1958)
- A Moment of Innocence (1996)
- Moment by Moment (1978)
- Moment to Moment (1966)
- A Moment to Remember (2004)
- The Moment of Truth: (1952 & 1965)
- Momentum: (1992, 2001 & 2003 TV)
- Momijigari (1899)
- Momma Don't Allow (1956)
- Mommaga (1997)
- Mommie Dearest (1981)
- Mommo the Bogeyman (2009)
- Mommy: (1995 & 2014)
- Momo: (1986 & 2001)
- Momotaro's Divine Sea Warriors (1945)
- Momotaro's Sea Eagles (1943)
- Moms (2012)
- Moms at War (2018)
- Moms' Night Out (2014)
- Momzillas (2013)

==== Mon ====
- Mon île était le monde (1992)
- Mon Mon Mon Monsters (2017)
- Mon Oncle (1958)
- Mon oncle d'Amérique (1980)
- Mon oncle Antoine (1971)
- Mon oncle Benjamin (1969)
- Mona Lisa (1986)
- Mona Lisa and the Blood Moon (2021)
- Mona Lisa Smile (2003)
- The Monastery of Sendomir (1920)
- Monday Morning (2002)
- Mondays in the Sun (2002)
- Mondo Cane (1962)
- Mondo New York (1988)
- Mondo Topless (1966)
- Mondo Trasho (1969)
- Mondovino (2004)
- The Mongoose (2026)
- Money from Home (1953)
- Money for Nothing: (1932 & 1993)
- Money Game (2015)
- The Money Jungle (1968)
- Money Money (1994)
- Money Movers (1978)
- The Money Pit (1986)
- Money Talks: (1926, 1932, 1972 & 1997)
- Money Train (1995)
- Moneyball (2011)
- Mongol: The Rise of Genghis Khan (2007)
- A Mongolian Tale (1995)
- Monk with a Camera (2014)
- Monk Comes Down the Mountain (2015)
- Monk Dawson (1998)
- The Monkey (2025)
- Monkey Business: (1931 & 1952)
- The Monkey King series:
  - The Monkey King (2014)
  - The Monkey King 2 (2016)
  - The Monkey King 3 (2018)
- Monkey King: Hero Is Back (2015)
- Monkey Man (2024)
- Monkey Shines (1988)
- Monkeybone (2001)
- Monkeyshines (1889)
- Monolith (2016)
- The Monolith Monsters (1957)
- Mononoke Hime (1997)
- Monos (2019)
- Monrak Transistor (2001)
- Monsieur Beaucaire: (1924 & 1946)
- Monsieur Hire (1990)
- Monsieur Hulot's Holiday (1954)
- Monsieur Ibrahim (2003)
- Monsieur Klein (1976)
- Monsieur Lazhar (2011)
- Monsieur N. (2003)
- Monsieur Verdoux (1947)
- Monsieur Vincent (1947)
- Monsoon: (1952, 2014, 2015 & 2019)
- Monsoon Mangoes (2016)
- The Monsoon Oracle (2013)
- Monsoon Raaga (2022)
- Monsoon Shootout (2013)
- Monsoon Wedding (2001)
- Monster: (2003, 2008, 2014, 2018, 2019, 2022 & 2023)
- The Monster: (1925, 1954, 1994 & 2016)
- Monster in a Box (1992)
- A Monster Calls (2016)
- Monster on the Campus (1958)
- The Monster Club (1981)
- Monster Dog (1984)
- Monster Family (2018)
- Monster Family 2 (2021)
- Monster from Green Hell (1958)
- Monster High (1989)
- Monster High series:
  - Monster High: Fright On! (2011)
  - Monster High: Escape from Skull Shores (2012)
  - Monster High: Friday Night Frights (2012)
  - Monster High: Boo York, Boo York (2015)
  - Monster High: The Movie (2022)
- Monster House (2006)
- Monster Hunt (2015)
- Monster Hunt 2 (2018)
- Monster Hunter (2020)
- Monster Man (2005)
- Monster Mash: (1995 & 2000)
- Monster from the Ocean Floor (1954)
- Monster Party (2018)
- The Monster of Phantom Lake (2006)
- The Monster of Piedras Blancas (1959)
- Monster from a Prehistoric Planet (1967)
- The Monster Squad (1987)
- Monster Strike The Movie (2016)
- The Monster That Challenged the World (1957)
- A Monster with a Thousand Heads (2015)
- Monster Trucks (2017)
- Monster's Ball (2001)
- Monster-in-Law (2005)
- Monsters: (2004, 2010 & 2015)
- Monsters. (2019)
- Monsters Crash the Pajama Party (1965)
- Monsters University (2013)
- Monsters vs Aliens (2009)
- Monsters: Dark Continent (2014)
- Monsters, Inc. (2001)
- Monsterz (2014)
- Monstrosity (1964)
- Monstrum (2018)
- Montana: (1950, 1990 TV, 1998, 2014 & 2017)
- Montana Story (2021)
- Montauk Chronicles (2014)
- Monte Carlo: (1921, 1925, 1926, 1930 & 2011)
- Monte Carlo or Bust! (1969)
- Monte Cristo: (1922 & 1929)
- Monterey Pop (1968)
- A Month in the Country (1987)
- A Month of Sundays: (2001 & 2015)
- Montparnasse 19 (1958)
- Monty Python series:
  - Monty Python and the Holy Grail (1975)
  - Monty Python Live at the Hollywood Bowl (1982)
  - Monty Python's Life of Brian (1979)
  - Monty Python's The Meaning of Life (1983)
- Monument Ave. (1998)
- The Monuments Men (2014)

==== Moo ====
- Mooch Goes to Hollywood (1971) (TV)
- Mooching Through Georgia (1939)
- Mood of the Day (2016)
- Mood Indigo (2013)
- Moodalmanju (1970)
- Moodar Koodam (2013)
- Moods of Crime (2016)
- Moods of the Sea (1979)
- Moog (2004)
- The Moogai (2024)
- Moon: (2009 & 2020)
- Moon 44 (1990)
- The Moon Is Blue (1953)
- Moon Child: (1989 & 2003)
- The Moon in the Gutter (1983)
- The Moon of Israel (1924)
- Moon Man: (2012 & 2022)
- Moon Over Miami (1941)
- Moon Over Parador (1988)
- The Moon and the Sledgehammer (1971)
- Moon of the Wolf (1972 TV)
- Moon Zero Two (1969)
- The Moon-Spinners (1964)
- Moonage Daydream (2022)
- Moonbeam Magic (1924)
- Moonfall (2022)
- Moonfleet (1955)
- Moonlight: (2002 & 2016)
- Moonlight Mile (2002)
- Moonlight and Valentino (1995)
- Moonlight Whispers (1999)
- Moonlighting (1982)
- Moonraker (1979)
- Moonrise (1948)
- Moonrise Kingdom (2012)
- Moonrunners (1975)
- The Moonshine War (1970)
- The Moonshiners (1916)
- Moonstruck (1987)
- Moontrap (1989)
- Moonwalker (1988)
- Moosa Khan (2002)

==== Mor–Moz ====
- Morbius (2022)
- More: (1969 & 1998)
- More American Graffiti (1979)
- The More the Merrier (1943)
- More than Blue (2009)
- More than Famous (2003)
- Morgan: (2012 & 2016)
- Morgan - A Suitable Case for Treatment (1966)
- Morgan Stewart's Coming Home (1987)
- Morgenrot (1933)
- Morgiana (1972)
- Morituri: (1948 & 1965)
- The Morning After: (1974 TV & 1986)
- Morning Glory: (1933 & 2010)
- Morning Patrol (1987)
- Morocco (1930)
- Mortal Engines (2018)
- The Mortal Instruments: City of Bones (2013)
- Mortal Kombat series:
  - Mortal Kombat: (1995 & 2021)
  - Mortal Kombat Annihilation (1997)
  - Mortal Kombat II (2026)
- The Mortal Storm (1940)
- Mortal Thoughts (1991)
- Mortuary: (1983 & 2005)
- The Mortuary Assistant (2026)
- The Mortuary Collection (2019)
- Morvern Callar (2002)
- Mosaic (2007)
- Moscow Does Not Believe in Tears (1979)
- Moscow on the Hudson (1984)
- Moses (1995)
- The Mosquito Coast (1986)
- Moss Rose (1947)
- The Most Beautiful Couple (2018)
- The Most Beautiful Couple in the World (1968)
- The Most Dangerous Game (1932)
- The Most Hated Woman in America (2017)
- A Most Violent Year (2014)
- Most Wanted: (1997 & 2011)
- Mostly Martha (2001)
- Motel Hell (1980)
- The Motel Life (2012)
- The Moth Diaries (2011)
- Mother: (1910, 1914, 1926, 1937, 1951, 1952, 1955, 1963, 1985, 1990, 1996, 1999 Indian, 1999 Russian, 2009, 2014, 2016 Estonian, 2016 Georgian & 2019)
- The Mother: (2003 & 2023)
- mother! (2017)
- Mother/Android (2021)
- Mother and Child (2010)
- Mother of George (2013)
- Mother Goose Melodies (1931)
- Mother Holly (1954)
- Mother India (1957)
- Mother Joan of the Angels (1961)
- Mother Mary: (1983 & 2026)
- Mother of Mine (2005)
- Mother Night (1996)
- Mother Schmuckers (2021)
- A Mother Should Be Loved (1934)
- Mother of Tears (2007)
- The Mother and the Whore (1973)
- Mother's Day: (1980, 2010, & 2016)
- A Mother's Prayer (1995)
- Mother, Jugs & Speed (1976)
- Mother, Mother, Mother Pin a Rose on Me (1924)
- Motherhood: (1917 & 2009)
- Mothering Sunday (2021)
- Motherless Brooklyn (2019)
- Mothers & Daughters: (2004 & 2008)
- Mothers and Daughters (2016)
- Mothers' Instinct (2024)
- Mothman (2010 TV)
- The Mothman Prophecies (2002)
- Mothra (1961)
- Mothra vs. Godzilla (1964)
- Motion Painting No. 1 (1947)
- Motor City (2025)
- The Motorcycle Diaries (2004)
- Motorpsycho (1965)
- Mouchette (1967)
- Moulin Rouge: (1952 & 2001)
- Mountain: (2015 & 2017)
- The Mountain: (1956, 1991, 2012 & 2018)
- The Mountain Between Us (2017)
- The Mountain of the Cannibal God (1979)
- Mountain Cry (2015)
- The Mountain Eagle (1926)
- Mountain Family Robinson (1979)
- The Mountain Road (1960)
- Mountains May Depart (2015)
- Mountains of the Moon (1990)
- Mourning Becomes Electra (1947)
- The Mourning Forest (2007)
- Mouse Hunt (1997)
- Mouse Menace (1946)
- The Mouse That Roared (1959)
- The Mouse on the Moon (1963)
- The Moustache (2005)
- The Mouth of the Wolf: (1988 & 2009)
- A Mouthful of Air (2021)
- The Mouthpiece (1932)
- Move Over, Darling (1963)
- A Movie (1958)
- Movie 43 (2013)
- Movie Crazy (1932)
- Movie Critters' Big Picture (2003)
- The Movie Emperor (2023)
- Moving: (1988 & 1993)
- Moving Malcolm (2003)
- Moving Violation (1976)
- Moving Violations (1985)
- Mowgli: Legend of the Jungle (2018)
- Moxie (2021)
- Mozart's Sister (2010)
- Mozu (2015)

=== Mr ===
- Mr. 3 Minutes (2006)
- Mr. 420 (1992)
- Mr. 420 (2012)
- Mr. 3000 (2004)
- Mr. Ability (2016)
- Mr. Accident (2000)
- Mr. Ace (1946)
- Mr. Aiello (1998)
- Mr. Airavata (2015)
- Mr. America (2013)
- Mr. Arkadin (1955)
- Mr. Average (2006)
- Mr. Azaad (1994)
- Mr. B Natural (1956)
- Mr. Bachchan (2024)
- Mr. Bachelor (2023)
- Mr. Bakra (2005)
- Mr. Bangladesh (2018)
- Mr. Baseball (1992)
- Mr. Bean's Holiday (2007)
- Mr. Black: Green Star (2015)
- Mr. Blandings Builds His Dream House (1948)
- Mr. Brooks (2007)
- Mr. Bug Goes to Town (1941)
- Mr. Butterfly (2003)
- Mr. Church (2016)
- Mr. Death: The Rise and Fall of Fred A. Leuchter, Jr. (2000)
- Mr. Deeds (2002)
- Mr. Deeds Goes to Town (1936)
- Mr. Destiny (1990)
- Mr. Donkey (2016)
- Mr. Freedom (1969)
- Mr. Harrigan's Phone (2022)
- Mr. High Heels (2016)
- Mr. Hobbs Takes a Vacation (1962)
- Mr. Holland's Opus (1995)
- Mr. Jealousy (1997)
- Mr. Klein (1976)
- Mr. Lucky (1943)
- Mr. Magoo (1997)
- Mr. Magoo's Christmas Carol (1962) (TV)
- Mr. Magorium's Wonder Emporium (2007)
- Mr. Majestyk (1974)
- Mr. Mike's Mondo Video (1979)
- Mr. Mom (1983)
- Mr. Morgan's Last Love (2013)
- Mr. & Mrs. '55 (1955)
- Mr. & Mrs. Adelman (2017)
- Mr. & Mrs. Bridge (1990)
- Mr. & Mrs. Incredible (2011)
- Mr. and Mrs. Iyer (2002)
- Mr. and Mrs. Khiladi (1997)
- Mr. & Mrs. Mahi (2024)
- Mr. & Mrs. Smith: (1941 & 2005)
- Mr. & Ms. Rowdy (2019)
- Mr. Nian (2016)
- Mr. Nice Guy: (1987 & 1997)
- Mr. Nobody (2009)
- Mr. Peabody and the Mermaid (1948)
- Mr. Peabody & Sherman (2014)
- Mr. Popper's Penguins (2011)
- Mr. Reliable (1996)
- Mr. Right: (2009 & 2015)
- Mr. Sardonicus (1962)
- Mr. Saturday Night (1992)
- Mr. Skeffington (1944)
- Mr. Smith Goes to Washington (1939)
- Mr. Topaze (1961)
- Mr. Turner (2014)
- Mr. Vampire series:
  - Mr. Vampire (1985)
  - Mr. Vampire II (1986)
  - Mr. Vampire III (1987)
  - Mr. Vampire IV (1988)
  - Mr. Vampire 1992 (1992)
- Mr. Woodcock (2007)
- Mr. Wrong (1996)
- Mr. Zhao (1998)
- Mrityudata (1997)
- Mrs Dalloway (1997)
- Mrs Henderson Presents (2005)
- Mrs. Brown (1997)
- Mrs. Brown's Boys D'Movie (2014)
- Mrs. Doubtfire (1993)
- Mrs. Harris (2005) (TV)
- Mrs. Harris Goes to Paris (2022)
- Mrs. Miniver (1942)
- Mrs. Palfrey at the Claremont (2008)
- Mrs. Parker and the Vicious Circle (1994)
- Mrs. Santa Claus (1996) (TV)
- Mrs. Winterbourne (1996)

=== Ms–Mt ===
- Ms J Contemplates Her Choice (2014)
- Ms Lekha Tharoor Kaanunnathu (2013)
- Ms. 45 (1981)
- Ms. Bear (1997)
- Ms. Kanyin (2025)
- Ms. Purple (2019)
- Ms. Scrooge (1997) (TV)
- Ms. Stiletto (1969)
- Ms. White Light (2019)
- Mt. Hakkoda (2014)
- Mt. Head (2002)
- Mt. Tsurugidake (2009)
- Mt. Zion (2013)

=== Mu ===
==== Muc–Mum ====
- Much Ado About Emmi (1940)
- Much Ado About Nixi (1942)
- Much Ado About Nothing (1973)
- Much Ado About Nothing (1993)
- Much Ado About Nothing (2012)
- Much Ado About Nothing (2016)
- Much Loved (2015)
- Much Too Shy (1942)
- Muchachas que estudian (1939)
- Muchachos bañándose en la laguna de Maracaibo (1897)
- Muchachos de la ciudad (1937)
- Muchachos impacientes (1966)
- Muchataga Mugguru (1985)
- Mucheettukalikkarante Mukal (1975)
- Mucho Locos (1966)
- Mucho Mucho Amor: The Legend of Walter Mercado (2020)
- Mud (1997)
- Mud (2012)
- Mud, Bloody Mud (1985) (TV)
- The Mud Boy (2007)
- Mud and Sand (1922)
- Mud and Soldiers (1939)
- Mudakkaruthaan (2024)
- Mudborn (2025)
- Mudbound (2017)
- Mudda Mandaram (1981)
- Mudda – The Issue (2003)
- Muddat (1986)
- Muddayi (1987)
- Muddina Kanmani (1997)
- Muddina Maava (1993)
- Muddu Bidda (1956)
- Muddu Bidda (1987)
- Muddu Manase (2015)
- Muddu Meena (1967)
- Muddula Krishnayya (1986)
- Muddula Mavayya (1989)
- Muddula Menalludu (1990)
- Muddula Mogudu (1983)
- Muddula Mogudu (1997)
- Muddula Priyudu (1994)
- Muddy (2021)
- Muddy River (1981)
- Muddy Track (2015)
- The Mudge Boy (2003)
- Mudhal Idam (2011)
- Mudhal Kanave (2007)
- Mudhal Kural (1992)
- Mudhal Mudhal Mudhal Varai (2008)
- Mudhal Nee Mudivum Nee (2022)
- Mudhal Paadal (1993)
- Mudhal Thethi (1955)
- Mudhal Udhayam (1995)
- Mudhalali (1957)
- Mudhalvan (1999)
- Mudhalvar Mahatma (2012)
- Mudharkanal (2026)
- Mudhoney (1965)
- Mudi Sooda Mannan (1978)
- Mudivalla Arambam (1984)
- Mudiyanaya Puthran (1961)
- Mudjackin' (2013)
- The Mudlark (1950)
- Mudra (1989)
- Mudramothiram (1978)
- Mudras Calling (2018)
- Mudrasta: Ang Beking Ina! (2025)
- Mududida Tavare Aralithu (1983)
- El Muerto (2005)
- Mufasa: The Lion King (2024)
- Mug Travel (2007)
- Mugavari (2000)
- Mughal-e-Azam (1960)
- Muhwagwa (1935)
- La mujer de mi hermano (2005)
- Mujhe Chand Chahiye (2000)
- Mujhse Dosti Karoge! (2002)
- Mujhse Shaadi Karogi (2004)
- Mulan: (1998, 2009 & 2020)
- Mulan II (2005)
- Mulan Joins the Army: (1928 & 1939)
- The Mule: (2014 & 2018)
- Mulholland Drive (2001)
- Mulholland Falls (1996)
- Mulk (2018)
- Mullet (2001)
- Multi-Facial (1994)
- Multiple Maniacs (1970)
- Multiple Sidosis (1970)
- Multiplicity (1996)
- Mum & Dad (2008)
- Mumbai Diaries (2011)
- Mumford (1999)
- The Mummy series:
  - The Mummy: (1932, 1999 & 2017)
  - The Mummy Returns (2001)
  - The Mummy: Tomb of the Dragon Emperor (2008)
  - The Mummy's Curse (1944)
  - The Mummy's Ghost (1944)
  - The Mummy's Hand (1940)
  - The Mummy's Tomb (1942)

==== Mun ====
- Muna (2019)
- Muna (2023)
- Muna Madan (2003)
- Muna Moto (1975)
- Munafik (2016)
- Munafik 2 (2018)
- Munarivippu (1993)
- Munchausen (2013)
- Münchhausen (1943)
- Munchie Strikes Back (1994)
- Munchies (1987)
- Munda Hi Chahida (2019)
- Munda Rockstar (2024)
- Mundadugu (1983)
- Mundane History (2009)
- Mundasupatti (2014)
- Munde Kamaal De (2015)
- Munde Patiala De (2012)
- Munde U.K. De (2009)
- Mundeyan Ton Bachke Rahin (2014)
- Mundhanai Mudichu (1983)
- Mundhinam Paartheney (2010)
- Mundina Nildana (2019)
- Mundrothuruth (2016)
- Munduvareda Adhyaya (2021)
- Mune: Guardian of the Moon (2014)
- The Munekata Sisters (1950)
- Mungarina Minchu (1997)
- Mungaru Male (2006)
- Mungaru Male 2 (2016)
- Munger Road (2011)
- Muni (2007)
- Munich (2005)
- Munich – The Edge of War (2021)
- A Munition Girl's Romance (1917)
- Munjane (2012)
- Munjaneya Manju (1993)
- Munje! (2001)
- Munjya (2024)
- Munkar (2024)
- Munna (1954)
- Munna (2007)
- Munna: A Love Story (2008)
- Munna Bhai M.B.B.S. (2003)
- Munna Mange Memsaab (2014)
- Munna Michael (2017)
- Munnar (2009)
- Munnariyippu (2014)
- Munnettam (1981)
- Munnibai (1999)
- Munnodi (2017)
- Munnudi (2000)
- Munro (1960)
- Munshigiri (2021)
- The Munsters series:
  - Munster, Go Home! (1966)
  - The Mini-Munsters (1973) (TV)
  - The Munsters' Revenge (1981) (TV)
  - Here Come the Munsters (1995) (TV)
  - The Munsters' Scary Little Christmas (1996) (TV)
  - The Munsters (2022)
- Munthiri Monchan (2019)
- Munthirikkaadu (2023)
- Munthirivallikal Thalirkkumbol (2017)
- Muntik Nang Maabot ang Langit (1995)
- Munyurangabo (2007)

==== Muo–Mur ====
- Muoi: The Legend of a Portrait (2007)
- Mupparimanam (2017)
- Mupperum Deviyar (1987)
- The Muppets series:
  - A Muppets Christmas: Letters to Santa (2008)
  - The Christmas Toy (1986)
  - Emmet Otter's Jug-Band Christmas (1977)
  - It's a Very Merry Muppet Christmas Movie (2002)
  - Kermit's Swamp Years (2002)
  - The Great Muppet Caper (1981)
  - The Muppets (2011)
  - Muppet Classic Theater (1994)
  - The Muppet Christmas Carol (1992)
  - A Muppet Family Christmas (1987) (TV)
  - Muppets Most Wanted (2014)
  - The Muppet Movie (1979)
  - Muppets from Space (1999)
  - The Muppets Take Manhattan (1984)
  - Muppet Treasure Island (1996)
  - The Muppets' Wizard of Oz (2005) (TV)
  - The Tale of the Bunny Picnic (1986)
  - Muppets Haunted Mansion (2021)
- Muppozhudhum Un Karpanaigal (2012)
- Muqaam (2022)
- Muqabala (1942)
- Muqabla (1979)
- Muqabla (1993)
- Muqadar (1996)
- Muqaddar Ka Badshaah (1990)
- Muqaddar Ka Faisla (1987)
- Muqaddar Ka Sikandar (1978)
- Muqaddar Ka Sikandar (1984)
- Mur Murs (1981)
- Mura (2024)
- Murad (2003) (TV)
- Muradan Muthu (1964)
- Murai Maaman (1995)
- Murai Mappillai (1995)
- Mural (2011)
- Murali Krishna (1964)
- Murali Krishnudu (1988)
- Murali Meets Meera (2011)
- Muran (2011)
- Murappennu (1965)
- Murari (2001)
- Murari (2015)
- Murari the Mad Gentleman (2016)
- Murattu Kaalai (1980)
- Murattu Kaalai (2012)
- Murattu Karangal (1986)
- Murder (2020)
- Murder! (1930)
- Murder series:
  - Murder (2004)
  - Murder 2 (2011)
  - Murder 3 (2013)
- Murder at 1600 (1997)
- Murder Ahoy (1964)
- A Murder Beside Yanhe River (2014)
- Murder in a Blue World (1973)
- A Murder of Crows (1999)
- Murder on D Street (1998)
- Murder at Dawn (1932)
- Murder by Death (1976)
- Murder by Decree (1979)
- Murder in the Big House (1942)
- Murder in the First (1995)
- Murder at the Gallop (1963)
- Murder in the Heartland (1993)
- Murder at Honeymoon Hotel (2016)
- Murder Most Foul (1964)
- Murder Is My Beat (1955)
- Murder Mystery (2019)
- Murder Mystery 2 (2023)
- Murder by Numbers (2002)
- Murder Obsession (1981)
- Murder One (1988)
- Murder on the Orient Express: (1974, 2001 TV & 2017)
- Murder in Pacot (2014)
- A Murder in the Park (2014)
- Murder by Phone (1982)
- Murder in a Small Town (1999) (TV)
- Murder at the Vanities (1934)
- Murder, My Sweet (1944)
- Murder-Set-Pieces (2004)
- Murderball (2005)
- The Murderer Lives at Number 21 (1942)
- Murderers' Row (1966)
- Murderous Maids (2000)
- Murders in the Rue Morgue: (1932 & 1971)
- Muri & Ko (2024)
- Muriel, or the Time of a Return (1963)
- Muriel's Wedding (1994)
- Murieta (1965)
- Murina (2021)
- Murió el sargento Laprida (1937)
- Muriyada Mane (1964)
- Murk (2005)
- Murmur (2019)
- Murmur (2022)
- Murmur (2025)
- Murmur of the Heart (1971)
- Murmur of the Hearts (2015)
- Murmur of Youth (1997)
- Murmurs of the Jungle (2021)
- Muro-Ami (1999)
- Muro: Damn the Humanist Inside (2008)
- Murph the Surf (1975)
- Murphy (2024)
- Murphy's I.O.U. (1913)
- Murphy's Law (1986)
- Murphy's Romance (1985)
- Murphy's War (1971)
- Muruga (2007)
- Murugaatrupadai (2014)
- Murugan Adimai (1977)

==== Mus–Muz ====
- Musa (2001)
- Musafir: (1940, 1957, 2004, 2013 & 2016)
- Musashi Miyamoto (1954)
- Muscle Tussle (1953)
- The Muse (1999)
- Museum Hours (2012)
- Mushrooming (2012)
- Music: (2008 & 2021)
- The Music (1972)
- Music in the Air (1934)
- Music from Another Room (1998)
- Music Box (1989)
- The Music Box (1932)
- The Music of Chance (1993)
- Music of the Heart (1999)
- The Music Lovers (1971)
- Music and Lyrics (2007)
- The Music Man: (1962 & 2003 TV)
- The Musical (2026)
- Musical Varieties (1948)
- The Musketeer (2001)
- The Musketeers of Pig Alley (1912)
- Must Love Dogs (2005)
- Mustache (2023)
- The Mustang (2019)
- Mutant (1984)
- Mutant (2025)
- Mutant Action (1993)
- Mutant Aliens (2001)
- Mutant Chronicles (2009)
- Mutant Hunt (1987)
- Mutant Swinger from Mars (2009)
- Mutant World (2014)
- Mutants (2008)
- Mutants (2009)
- Mutants (2016)
- Mute (2005)
- Mute (2018)
- Mute Witness (1995)
- Mutekiga Ore o Yondeiru (1960)
- Muthal Mariyathai (1985)
- Muthal Pakkam (2025)
- Muthal Seethanam (1992)
- Muthal Vasantham (1986)
- Muthalali (1965)
- Mutham (2002)
- Muthu (1995)
- The Mutilator (1984)
- Mutiny (2026)
- Mutiny on the Bounty: (1935 & 1962)
- Mutual Appreciation (2005)
- Muvva Gopaludu (1987)
- Muyyige Muyyi (1978)
- Muzikantská Liduška (1940)
- Muzzle (2023)
- Muzzle: City of Wolves (2025)

=== Mv–Mx ===
- MVP 2: Most Vertical Primate (2002)
- MVP: Most Valuable Primate (2000)
- MXP: Most Extreme Primate (2003)

=== My ===
- My 20th Century (1989)
- My 5 Wives (2000)
- My Adorable Savage (1952)
- My Afternoons with Margueritte (2010)
- My All American (2015)
- My Amanda (2021)
- My Ambition (2006)
- My American Cousin (1985)
- My American Uncle (1980)
- My American Wife: (1922 & 1936)
- My Animal (2023)
- My Architect (2003)
- My Autograph (2006)
- My Baby's Daddy (2004)
- My Beautiful Girl, Mari (2002)
- My Beautiful Laundrette (1985)
- My Best Fiend (1999)
- My Best Friend: (2001, 2006 & 2018)
- My Best Friend Is a Vampire (1988)
- My Best Friend's Birthday (1987)
- My Best Friend's Exorcism (2022)
- My Best Friend's Girl: (1983 & 2008)
- My Best Friend's Wedding: (1997 & 2016)
- My Big Fat Greek Wedding (2002)
- My Blood Runs Cold (1965)
- My Bloody Valentine (1981)
- My Bloody Valentine 3D (2009)
- My Blue Heaven (1990)
- My Blueberry Nights (2007)
- My Bodyguard (1980)
- My Boss's Daughter (2003)
- My Boss, My Hero (2001)
- My Boss, My Teacher (2006)
- My Boyfriend is Type B (2005)
- My Boyfriend's Back (1993)
- My Brilliant Career (1979)
- My Brother's Wedding (1983)
- My Bunny Lies Over the Sea (1948)
- My Chauffeur (1986)
- My Cousin Rachel: (1952 & 2017)
- My Cousin Vinny (1992)
- My Darling Clementine (1946)
- My Date with Drew (2005)
- My Date with the President's Daughter (1998) (TV)
- My Daughter’s Killer (documentary) (2022)
- My Days of Mercy (2017)
- My Dead Friend Zoe (2024)
- My Dinner with Andre (1981)
- My Dog Skip (2000)
- My Donkey, My Lover & I (2020)
- My Fair Lady (1964)
- My Family (1995)
- My Father the Hero: (1991 & 1994)
- My Father Is a Hero (1995)
- My Father's Glory (1991)
- My Favorite Brunette (1947)
- My Favorite Martian (1999)
- My Favorite Season (1993)
- My Favorite Spy: (1942 & 1951)
- My Favorite Wife (1940)
- My Favorite Year (1982)
- My Fellow Americans (1996)
- My Feral Heart (2016)
- My First Mister (2001)
- My Foolish Heart: (1949 & 2018)
- My Friend Dahmer (2017)
- My Friend Flicka (1943)
- My Friend Irma (1949)
- My Friend Irma Goes West (1950)
- My Friend, Kolka! (1961)
- My Geeky Nerdy Buddies (2014)
- My Geisha (1962)
- My Giant (1998)
- My Girl (1991)
- My Girl 2 (1994)
- My Gun Is Quick (1957)
- My Hawaiian Discovery (2014)
- My Heart Belongs to Daddy (1942)
- My Hero: (1912 & 1990)
- My Heroes Have Always Been Cowboys (1991)
- My Last Day (2011)
- My Learned Friend (1943)
- My Left Eye Sees Ghosts (2002)
- My Left Foot (1989)
- My Life (1993)
- My Life in Cinemascope (2004)
- My Life as a Courgette (2016)
- My Life as a Dog (1985)
- My Life on Ice (2002)
- My Life for Ireland (1941)
- My Life to Live (1962)
- My Life for Maria Isabella (1935)
- My Life as McDull (2001)
- My Life in Pink (1997)
- My Life in Ruins (2009)
- My Life So Far (1999)
- My Life Without Me (2003)
- My Little Chickadee (1940)
- My Little Eye (2002)
- My Little Hero (2013)
- My Little Pony series:
  - My Little Pony: The Movie: (1986 & 2017)
  - My Little Pony: The Princess Promenade (2006)
  - My Little Pony: A Very Minty Christmas (2005)
  - My Little Pony: Equestria Girls (2013)
- My Little Sister: (1919 & 2020)
- My Love: (1970, 2006 & 2007)
- My Love Story!! (2015)
- My Lover My Son (1970)
- My Lucky Star: (1933, 1938, 2003 & 2013)
- My Lucky Stars (1985)
- My Man: (1924, 1928, 1996 & 2014)
- My Man Godfrey (1936)
- My Man and I (1952)
- My Mighty Princess (2008)
- My Mother, the Mermaid (2004)
- My Mother's Wedding (2023)
- My Name Is Bill W. (1989)
- My Name Is Bruce (2007)
- My Name Is Joe (1998)
- My Name Is Julia Ross (1945)
- My Name Is Khan (2010)
- My Name Is Modesty (2003)
- My Name Is Nobody (1973)
- My Name Is Pecos (1967)
- My Neighbor Totoro (1988)
- My Neighbors the Yamadas (1999)
- My New Partner (1985)
- My New Sassy Girl (2015)
- My Night at Maud's (1969)
- My Night with Reg (1996)
- My Nights Are More Beautiful Than Your Days (1989)
- My Octopus Teacher (2020)
- My Old Kentucky Home: (1922, 1926 & 1938)
- My Old School: (2013 & 2022)
- My One and Only (2009)
- My Original Dream (2015)
- My Own Love Song (2010)
- My Own Private Idaho (1991)
- My Own Swordsman (2011)
- My Prison Yard (2008)
- My Policeman (2022)
- My Salinger Year (2020)
- My Sassy Girl (2001)
- My Sassy Girl 2 (2010)
- My Scary Girl (2006)
- My Science Project (1985)
- My Second Brother (1959)
- My Side of the Mountain (1969)
- My Sister Eileen: (1942 & 1955)
- My Sister, My Love (1966)
- My Sister's Keeper (2009)
- My Six Convicts (1952)
- My Son: (1925, 1928, 2007 & 2021)
- My Son the Fanatic (1998)
- My Son John (1952)
- My Son, My Son, What Have Ye Done (2009)
- My Sons (1991)
- My Soul to Take (2010)
- My Stepmother is an Alien (1988)
- My Summer of Love (2004)
- My Summer Story (1994)
- My Super Ex-Girlfriend (2006)
- My Sweet Little Village (1985)
- My Teacher, Mr. Kim (2003)
- My Teacher, My Obsession (2018)
- My Tomorrow, Your Yesterday (2016)
- My True Story (1951)
- My Tutor (1983)
- My Uncle (1958)
- My Uncle Antoine (1971)
- My Uncle Barbassous (1921)
- My Uncle Benjamin: (1924 & 1969)
- My Voyage to Italy (1999)
- My War (2016)
- My Way: (1973, 2011 & 2012)
- My Week with Marilyn (2011)
- My Wife Is an Actress (2001)
- My Wife Is a Gangster (2001)
- My Wife Is a Gangster 2 (2003)
- My Wife Got Married (2008)
- My Winnipeg (2007)
- My Worst Nightmare (2011)

==== Mya–Myt ====
- Myaw Lint Chin Myar Swar (2006)
- Myet Nhar Myar Tae Kaung Kin (2004)
- Myet Nu (2020)
- Mylanchi Monchulla Veedu (2014)
- Myna (2013)
- Myna Has Gone (2008)
- Mynaa (2010)
- Mynarski Death Plummet (2014)
- Mynatharuvi Kolakase (1967)
- Myra Breckinridge (1970)
- Myriad of Lights (1948)
- Myriam Fares: The Journey (2021)
- Myself in the Distant Future (1997)
- Mysteries of Lisbon (2010)
- Mysteries of London (1915)
- The Mysteries of Paris: (1922, 1935, 1943, 1957 & 1962)
- The Mysteries of Pittsburgh (2008)
- The Mysterious Doctor (1943)
- The Mysterious Dr. Fu Manchu (1929)
- Mysterious Island: (1941, 1961, 2005 TV & 2011)
- The Mysterious Island: (1905 & 1929)
- Mysterious Island 2 (2013)
- The Mysterious Miss C. (2002)
- Mysterious Object at Noon (2000)
- A Mysterious Portrait (1899)
- Mysterious Skin (2004)
- A Mysterious World (2011)
- Mysterium Occupation (2004)
- Mystery: (2012 & 2014)
- Mystery Date (1991)
- The Mystery of Death (2015)
- The Mystery of Edwin Drood: (1935, 1993 & 2012 TV)
- Mystery of Mamo (1978)
- Mystery Mansion (1983)
- The Mystery of Marie Roget (1942)
- Mystery Men (1999)
- The Mystery of Picasso (1956)
- The Mystery of Pine Creek Camp (1913)
- Mystery Science Theater 3000: The Movie (1996)
- Mystery Street (1950)
- Mystery Train (1989)
- Mystery of the Wax Museum (1933)
- Mystery, Alaska (1999)
- Mystic Pizza (1988)
- Mystic River (2003)
- Mystical Adventure (1988)
- Mystify: Michael Hutchence (2019)
- The Myth (2005)
- The Myth of the American Sleepover (2010)
- The Myth of Fingerprints (1997)
- Myth of Kleopatra (2014)
- Myth of Love (2021)
- Mythili Ennai Kaathali (1986)
- Mythos (1987)
- Mythri (2012)
- Mythri (2015)

Previous: List of films: L Next: List of films: N–O

== See also ==
- Lists of films
- Lists of actors
- List of film and television directors
- List of documentary films
- List of film production companies
