= My Old School =

My Old School can refer to:

- "My Old School" (song), a 1973 single from the Steely Dan album Countdown to Ecstasy
- My Old School (2013 film), about an abandoned school in the U.S. state of Rhode Island
- My Old School (2022 film), about the Brandon Lee affair in Scotland

== See also ==
- Old school (disambiguation)
