= Memory Lane (2012 film) =

- Directed by: Shawn Holmes
- Written by: Shawn Holmes & H.K. Sathappan
- Starring: Michael Guy Allen, Meg Barrick, Julian Curi
- Cinematography: Shawn Holmes
- Edited by: Shawn Holmes
- Production company: 553AM Creative Group
- Distributed by: WildEye Releasing
- Release date: May 6, 2012
- Running time: 72 minutes
- Country: United States
- Language: English
- Budget: $300.00

Memory Lane is a 2012 science-fiction film by American director Shawn Holmes and his directorial debut. The film world-premiered on May 6, 2012, at the Sci-Fi-London film festival in London, England and was funded by Shawn Holmes with a budget of less than $300.

Of the film, Holmes stated that he was inspired to create Memory Lane after his friend Michael Guy Allen returned from a tour of duty in Afghanistan. Filming took place in Martins Ferry, Ohio and Wheeling, West Virginia.

== Synopsis ==
Nick (Michael Guy Allen) is a soldier suffering from PTSD. One day while he is out jogging he meets Kayla (Meg Braden), a suicidal young woman ready to throw herself off a bridge. Nick talks her out of the attempt and the two quickly fall in love. Life seems to be getting better until one day he finds Kayla dead in a bathtub. Heartbroken, he tries to kill himself as well but is resuscitated by friends. Moments before he is resuscitated, Nick experiences a series of visions that lead him to believe that Kayla died because she was murdered, not because she killed herself. He decides that the only way to really know the truth is to travel to the afterlife to see Kayla, which requires him to repeatedly kill himself.

== Cast ==
- Michael Guy Allen as Nick Boxer
- Meg Braden as Kayla M
- Julian Curi as Elliot White
- Zac Snyder as Ben Haven
- David D'Andrea as Mitch Harper
- Marianna Alacchi as The Jewelry Lady

== Reception ==
Critical reception has been positive. The Hollywood News noted that "the film isn't without its faults, but they are ones inherent in low-budget filmmaking". Ain't It Cool News stated that "the concept for Memory Lane is a winner".

In contrast, DVD Talk wrote: "The story was more of a hook and less of a continuous attention-grabber."

== Awards and nominations ==
Year	Award	Category	Film	Result
2014	Pollygrind Film Festival	Best Arthouse Film	Memory Lane	Won
