= Magnetické vlny léčí =

Magnetické vlny léčí is a Czech comedy film. It was released in 1965.
