= Max, 13 =

- Directed by: Abe Levy
- Written by: Abe Levy
- Produced by: Abe Levy
- Starring: Max Hurwitz; Jorja Dwyer; Christopher Jaymes
- Cinematography: Ruben O'Malley
- Edited by: Jacob Bricca; Jennifer Matson
- Music by: Jeff Grove
- Distributed by: Colorfast Pictures
- Release date: 1999
- Country: United States
- Language: English

Max, 13 is a 1999 American drama film directed by Abe Levy in his directorial debut. It revolves around a 13-year-old boy coming of age in rural Northern California. This film featured Marshall resident, Max Hurwitz, who continues to reside in Marshall as well as Petaluma.

== Cast ==
- Max Hurwitz as Max
- Jorja Dwyer as Claire
- Christopher Jaymes as Daniel
- April Daniels as Valerie
- Josh Faure-Brac as Camera Store Clerk
- Daedalus Howell as Ray
- Kandis Kozolanka as Mrs. Eggles
- Aerielle Levy as Florida
- Greg Marquardt as Harvey
- Christine Renaudin as Frida
- Devon Rumrill as Floyd
- Nick Scott as Dallas
- Shaina Solomon as Sasha
- Josh Staples as Ronnie
- Sienna S'Zell as Marianne
- Robert Vandermaaten as Jonathan

== Additional sources ==
- metroactive.com, (about Levy) "North Bay filmmakers forge a new cinematic scene: Abe Levy and Silver Tree ...Lifelong Sonoma County resident Abe Levy has proven himself a filmmaker to the degree that he actually has a second home in Hollywood...."
- Daedalus Howell: "09.15.99, FINAL CUT: Tomales-borne director Abe Levy unthaws the freeze-frame on his coming-of-age opus "Max, 13 this weekend at the Phoenix Theater"
- Sonoma Wine Country: "Ever since 1973, Petaluma has served as a location for many major films, including: ...Max, 13 (1997) 4 day shoot in Petaluma and 10 day shoot in Tomales..."
- Petaluma.org: "Some of the movies in which you can find scenes of Petaluma are: ...Max, 13 (1997)..."
- Cinema Picuria: (about Levy) "Abe Levy has directed a handful of feature films"
- Faltbush Pictures: (about the editor) "Jeni Matson edited Abe Levy's acclaimed debut feature, MAX, 13"
