= Mother (2016 Georgian film) =

- Film festival poster
- Directed by: Rati Tsiteladze
- Written by: Nino Varsimashvili
- Produced by: Rati Tsiteladze
- Starring: Nino Varsimashvili
- Cinematography: Roman Symonian
- Edited by: Rati Tsiteladze
- Production company: ArtWay Film
- Release date: January 12, 2016 (44th Festival of Nations)
- Running time: 14 minutes
- Country: Georgia
- Language: Georgian

Mother (Georgian: დედა; Deda) is a 2016 Georgian short film directed by Rati Tsiteladze.

Based on a true story, the film is written and acted by Nino Varsimashvili. Mother was screened at more than 100 film festivals in more than 40 countries.

The short won the main prizes at 5th Tetova International Film Festival, 23rd Corto Imola Festival, 20th Faludi International Film Festival and 5th Mostra de Curtmetratges per la Identitat.

== Synopsis ==
A single mother is forced to hide her child's existence, because of the social and cultural context in order not to become the subject of judgment and condemnation.

== Cast ==
- Nino Varsimashvili as Tea
- Natela Mamasakhlisi as Tamara
- Ana Mamasakhlisi as Cashier
- Zuka Malashkhia as Child
- Olga Slusareva as Elena
- Rati Tsiteladze as Dato
- Irma Varsimashvili as Lela
- Dea Tsiteladze as Maka
- Tako Tvauri as Reporter

== Reception ==
The film gained national and international recognition. The film has received mostly positive reviews. Jury members from the Corto Imola Festival noted "Rati Tsiteladze has been able to tell and show, in a poetic black and white way and with an increasing suspence, the drama of a real story: a single (and alone) mother forced to hide the existence of her child in front of a community that is only able to judge and disapprove." Mostra de Curtmetratges per la Identitat noted: "PRIZE FOR THE BEST SHORT FILM: "DEDA" (Georgia, Rati Tsiteladze) for its denunciation to the repression to exercise with freedom the right to be a mother." The film brought the issue of single mothers on the surface within the region. There are over 40 000 child born from an unregistered relationship and women who give birth to the child out of wedlock, are rejected not only by their partners but also their families and society. The film has raised the question about what the government or society is doing in order to make a difference.

== Awards and nominations ==
Awards and nominations for Mother
| Year | Association | Country | Award category | Status |
| 2016 | 20th Faludi Film Festival | Hungary | Best Film / 1st prize | Won |
| 2016 | 5th Tetova International Film Festival ODA | Macedonia | Best Film | Won |
| 2016 | 5th Tetova International Film Festival ODA | Macedonia | Best Cinematographer | Won |
| 2016 | KineNova International film festival Skopje | Macedonia | Best Film | Nominated |
| 2016 | 23rd Corto Imola Festival | Italy | Festival Winner / Audience Award | Won |
| 2016 | 11th Dieciminuti Film Festival | Italy | EXTRALARGE | Finalist |
| 2016 | 19th Mestre Film Festival, Italy | Italy | Best Short Film | Nominated |
| 2016 | 13th SediciCorto Film Festival | Italy | Best Film | Nominated |
| 2016 | 5th Mostra de Curtmetratges per la Identitat | Spain | Best Film | Won |
| 2016 | 25th Festival Internacional de Cine de Madrid | Spain | Best Short Film | Nominated |
| 2016 | 18th Internacional Film Festival Bay of Pasaia | Spain | Best Short Film - Drama | Nominated |
| 2016 | 8th Festival International Cortometrajes Pilas en Corto | Spain | Best Film ( International) | Nominated |
| 2016 | 5th La mida no importa | Spain | Best Short Film | Nominated |
| 2016 | 25th Festival Internacional de Cortometrajes Flor Azul | Argentina | Grand Jury Prize | Won |
| 2016 | 6th FIVA Festival Internacional de Videoarte | Argentina | Best Film ( International) | Nominated |
| 2016 | 7th EL Festival Internacional del Cortometraje | Argentina | Best Short Film | Nominated |
| 2016 | 44th Festival of Nations | Austria | Best Film | Nominated |
| 2016 | CreActive International Open Film Festival | Bangladesh | Country Best Awards | Won |
| 2016 | 7th UABC Autónoma de Baja California | Mexico | Best Short Film | Nominated |
| 2016 | MFF Film Festival | United Kingdom | Best Film Trailer | Won |
| 2016 | TMC London Film Festival | United Kingdom | Best Drama | Finalist |
| 2016 | LMFF London Film Festival | United Kingdom | Best Short Film | Nominated |
| 2016 | TMFF Film Festival | United Kingdom | Best International Short Film | Nominated |
| 2016 | 8th UCIF International Film Festival | USA | Best Actress | Won |
| 2016 | 14th Central Michigan International Film Festival | USA | Best Short Film | Finalist |
| 2016 | 11th Sunnyside Shorts Film Festival | USA | Best Film | Finalist |
| 2016 | 3rd IndustryBoosT Competition | USA | Best Foreign Film | Finalist |
| 2016 | Hollywood Screenings Film Festival | USA | Best Short Film | Finalist |
| 2016 | 7th Fayetteville Film Fes | USA | Best Short Film | Nominated |
| 2016 | 12MFF International Film Festival | USA | Best International Short Film | Nominated |
| 2016 | 6th W.I.N.D. Festival | USA | Best Short Film | Nominated |
| 2016 | 6th W.I.N.D. Festival | USA | Best Actress | Nominated |
| 2016 | 2nd Davis International Film Festival | USA | International Short Film | Nominated |
| 2016 | 2nd Global Short Film Awards | USA | GSF Awards Contestant | Nominated |
| 2016 | 12th The São Paulo Times Film Festival | Brazil | Best Short Film | Finalist |
| 2016 | 12th Cinefest Gato Preto | Brazil | Best Short Film | Nominated |
| 2016 | Kinosmena International Film Festival | Belarus | Best Short Film | Finalist |
| 2016 | 3rd Minikino Film Week | Indonesia | Best Short Film | Finalist |
| 2016 | Cinema Grand Prix 2017 | Indonesia | Best Foreign Film | Nominated |
| 2016 | 2nd Surfing The Coldstream Film Festival | Australia | Best Short Film | Finalist |
| 2016 | 10th World Independent Film Awards | Poland | Best Foreign Film | Nominated |
| 2016 | 7th Festival de Cine: Infancia y Adolescencia | Colombia | Best Short Film | Nominated |
| 2016 | European International Film Festival | Russia | Best Narrative Short Film | Nominated |
| 2016 | 3rd Tula International Film Festival | Russia | Best Film | Nominated |
| 2016 | 6th Point in the Endless Universe | Russia | Best Film | Nominated |
| 2016 | Craft Film Festival | Russia | Best Foreign Film | Nominated |
| 2016 | 4th Ferfilm international Festival | Kosovo | Best Narrative Short Film | Nominated |
| 2016 | 2nd Bridge Film Fest | Kosovo | Bes International Film | Nominated |
| 2016 | 3rd Chennai International Film Festival | India | Best Short Film | Nominated |
| 2016 | Bucharest ShortCut CineFest | Romania | Best Trailer | Nominated |
| 2016 | Feminist and Queer International Film Festival | Romania | Best Short Film | Nominated |
| 2016 | 3rd Fresco Inter. Festival of Modern Art and Spiritual Films | Armenia | Best Narrative Short Film | Nominated |
| 2016 | 3rd Sose International Film Festival | Armenia | Best Film | Nominated |
| 2016 | Rivne International Film Festival | Ukraine | Best Short Film | Nominated |
| 2016 | Golden Dragonfly International Film Festival | Dominican Republic | Best Short Film | Nominated |
| 2016 | 5th International Crime and Punishment Film Festival | Turkey | Golden Scales Short Film | Nominated |
| 2016 | 5th Hak-İş Short Film Festival | Turkey | International Short Film | Nominated |
