= Majid (film) =

- Directed by: Nassim Abassi
- Starring: Brahim Al Bakali, Lotfi Sabir
- Release date: 2010
- Country: Morocco

Majid is a 2010 Moroccan film written and directed by Nassim Abassi, starring Brahim Al Bakali and Lotfi Sabir. The film premiered at the Leighton House Museum with the MENA film festival.

== Plot ==
The main character, a ten-year-old Moroccan orphan named Majid, has recently moved to Mohammedia with his brother. His brother is an appealing and careless drunk. Majid makes very little money on the streets selling books, and lives a very simple and disheartening life. From the start of the film, Majid is having reoccurring nightmares and soon realizes that he cannot remember his deceased parents' (who had died in a fire) faces anymore. He also realizes that he has no photographs of his parents, except for a ruined family photograph, in which his parents' heads are burnt away from the photo due to the fire. He meets a new street-smart friend named Larbi, who helps him on the journey to find a photograph of his parents. This search leads them to the big city of Casablanca where they come face to face with many dangerous events and become part of a moving adventure.

== Cast ==
- Brahim Al Bakali as Majid
- Lotfi Sabir as Larbi
- Wassime Zidi
- Moulay Abdellah Lamrani
- Abderrahim Tounsi
- Mohammed Ben Brahim
- Aïcha Mahmah
- Hicham Ibrahimi
- Mostafa El Houari
- Aziz Hattab
- Youssef Karte
- Brahim Khai
- Mohamed Harraga
- Yassine Sekkal
- Fayçal Azizi

== Reception ==
The film was greatly received by many critics. Raphael Cormack had written in the Arab Review that the film is "both genuinely funny and genuinely moving". The film had also won numerous awards like in Morocco's National Film Festival, Rotterdam Arab Film Festival and many more.
