= Meme (film) =

- Film poster
- Directed by: Sean Mannion
- Screenplay by: Sean Mannion
- Produced by: Carolyn Maher
- Starring: Sarah Schoofs, Shivantha Wijesinha, Lauren A. Kennedy, Kitty Ostapowicz, and Chaz H. Cleveland
- Cinematography: Peter Westervelt
- Edited by: Sean Mannion
- Music by: Valerie Opielski
- Release date: June 9, 2018 (The Art of Brooklyn Film Festival)
- Running time: 87 minutes
- Country: United States
- Language: English

Meme is a 2018 independent drama film directed by Sean Mannion. The film had its world premiere at the Art of Brooklyn Film Festival in 2018, where it was awarded Outstanding Narrative Feature. The film stars Sarah Schoofs as Jennifer, a freelancer whose quest to find the creator of a surreal mashup VHS tape leads her to finding herself.

== Synopsis ==
Jennifer is a young Brooklyn freelancer dissatisfied with her job and her relationship with Tommy, a VHS collector. She discovers a surreal mashup videotape among Tommy's friend's tapes labeled 'Meme'. As her life spirals out of control, she searches for the tape's creator, in order to find answers about its contents.

== Cast ==
- Sarah Schools as Jennifer
- Shivantha Wijesinha as Tommy
- Lauren A. Kennedy as Lesley
- Kitty Ostapowciz as Carrie
- Chaz H. Cleveland as Kyle
- June Dare as Larraine
- Alex Bone as Marcus
- Tara Cioletti as Dr. Danielle Blackmore
- Matthew K. Addison as Craig (as Matthew Addison)
- Phillip Andry as Carlos
- Lauren Shaw as Lee
- Corinne Fisher as Woman in Bathroom

== Critical response ==
Meme received mixed reviews from critics during its festival run and U.S. independent theatre tour.

M. Faust of The Public referred to the film as a "fascinating independent feature". Kevin Rakestraw of Film Pulse praised the film's use of commercials for fictional products and films to build a new world while also commenting that performances came off as emotionally monotone.

In contrast, Kirk Fernwood of One Film Fan praised the performances and said, "What could have been your average tale of a broken relationship, self-doubt, and battling alcoholism gets a definitive indie makeover plus unique execution that ventures into the experimental/idiosyncratic/darkly humorous veins and sends the viewer on an unconventional adventure of one young woman’s fight for identity and value."

Mike Haberfelner of Search My Trash said that the film was "a wonderful, at times otherworldly puzzle, held together by a strong ensemble with Sarah Schoofs giving her all in the lead." Tasha Danzig of The Movie Sleuth wrote that "the film was surprisingly done well for an internet movie - "from an original way of presenting interactions by utilizing scene backgrounds, to the sound use of periodical intercut scenes that reiterate the main character’s realisations to effectively portray the elements of Jennifer’s crumbling relationship."

Charlie Nicholson praised the film for its ambition, while also criticising the philosophy that dominates the Meme tape that Jennifer investigates. He mentioned that "in what ultimately uses a mystery setup to interrogate questions of existence and identity, the reams of cluttered campus waffle sometimes prevents its tenser moments becoming as effective as they could have been." Alex Saveliev similarly criticised the philosophising and stylistic choices of the film asking: "to what end? Meme is chock-full of odd choices that seem purposeful and the director or screenwriter divulge some inner demons only they can explain."
