= Muqaam =

- Directed by: Umaa Prakash Tiwari
- Written by: Umaa Prakash Tiwari
- Screenplay by: Umaa Prakash Tiwari
- Produced by: Ravi Sharma
- Starring: Sandeep Bose, Prabhakar Srinet, Aditi Awasthi& Neeraj kumar Tyagi
- Cinematography: A Vell Murugan and Santosh Pal
- Edited by: Virat Gupta
- Production company: Ravi Ram Production
- Release date: 28 April 2022
- Country: India
- Language: Hindi

Muqaam is a 2022 Indian Hindi-language film. The film was made by the Ravi Ram Production company. The film was written and directed by Uma Prakash and produced by Ravi Sharma. The movie was released in Hungama on 28 April 2022.

== Cast ==
- Sandeep Bose as Saleem
- Prabhakar Srinet as Tahir
- Nidhi Pandey as Disha
- Mahendra Sriwas as Chandu
- Aditi Awasthi as Zoya
- Neeraj Kumar Tyagi as Muhammad
