= Mother (1951 film) =

- Directed by: Esmail Koushan
- Written by: Ali Kasmaie
- Produced by: Esmail Kushan; Shapur Yasami
- Cinematography: Enayatallah Famin
- Production company: Pars Film
- Release date: 13 December 1951
- Running time: 120 minutes
- Country: Iran
- Language: Persian

Mother (Persian: مادر, romanized: Mādar; lit. 'Mother') is a 1951 Iranian drama film directed by Esmail Koushan.

== Cast ==
- Abdullah Baghaie
- Ali-Asghar Berenji
- Alexander Bijanian
- Delkash

== Bibliography ==
- Mohammad Ali Issari. Cinema in Iran, 1900-1979. Scarecrow Press, 1989.
