= The Maze (2010 film) =

- Directed by: Stephen Shimek
- Written by: Katy Baldwin; Timothy Gutierrez
- Produced by: Katy Baldwin; Timothy Gutierrez; Stephen Shimek; Kristi Shimek; Jake Sorensen
- Starring: Shalaina Castle; Brandon Sean Pearson; Clare Niederpruem; Kyle Paul; Will Tye Nelson
- Cinematography: Ephraim Smith
- Edited by: Kristi Shimek
- Music by: Lance Montgomery
- Production company: Ground Glass Entertainment
- Distributed by: SunWorld Pictures
- Release date: October 19, 2010
- Running time: 86 minutes
- Country: United States
- Language: English
- Budget: US$200,000

The Maze is a 2010 American independent horror film, directed by Stephen Shimek and starring Shalaina Castle, Brandon Sean Pearson, Clare Niederpruem, Kyle Paul and Will Tye Nelson. With a budget of $200,000, it was released to theaters on October 19, 2010.

== Plot ==
A group of five teenagers who sneak into a corn maze after hours are stalked by a psychopathic killer.
