= Mon île était le monde =

- Directed by: Jacques Baratier
- Screenplay by: Jacques Baratier
- Produced by: MAB Films, RFO
- Release date: 1992
- Running time: 52 minutes
- Country: France

Mon île était le monde is a 1992 documentary film.

== Synopsis ==
A world born from the eyes of a poet. Jean Albany created his island, his feelings created his universe: The sea, the birds, the women, the flowers... gave him a language. He writes in Creole, uniting the roots of Réunion. Some of his works are Zamal, Miel vert, Bleu Mascarin, Bal indigo.
