= Musical Varieties =

- Release date: 1948
- Running time: 10 minutes
- Country: United States
- Language: English

Musical Varieties is a 1948 Pictorial Films musical short film starring Rosemary Lane and Johnny Downs.

== Plot summary ==
Farm workers harvest the crop whilst singing. At night they meet at the barn dance for more singing and dancing. Later, a man and a woman declare their love for each other, that "you could have knocked me over with a feather". The pair's song number is imitated by a male trio, one impersonating the woman.

== Cast ==
- Rosemary Lane
- Johnny Downs
- Radio Rogues
- Eddie Le Baron's Orchestra
