= Macbeth (1915 film) =

1915 French film adaptation

Macbeth is a French 1915 film adaptation of the William Shakespeare play Macbeth. It was released on December 31, 1915, in France. It is a silent black-and-white film with French intertitles.

The film is presumed lost and was described as a "series of illustrative scenes".

== Cast and crew ==
- Séverin-Mars as Macbeth (also director), the actor had regularly interpreted the role on stage
- Georgette Leblanc
