= Makan esmoh alwatan =

- Directed by: Tamer Ezzat
- Screenplay by: Nadine Shams
- Produced by: MYTH Productions
- Cinematography: Tamer Ezzat
- Edited by: Tamer Ezzat
- Music by: Tamer Ezzat
- Release date: 2006
- Running time: 61 minutes
- Country: Egypt

Makan esmoh alwatan (in Arabic مكان اسمه الوطن) is an Egyptian 2006 documentary film.

== Synopsis ==
Four young Egyptians take different paths to find the place they can each call "home". Due to economic, religious or educational reasons, they are faced with difficulties that will force them to look for a way out through emigration or trying to live with the people that surround them.

== Awards ==
- Aljazeera Documentary FF 2006
- National Egyptian FF2006
- Rotterdam Arab FF 2006
- Ismailia FF 2006
