= My Old School (2013 film) =

- Directed by: Jason Allard
- Produced by: Scott Gabrielson
- Edited by: Jason Allard
- Music by: Randy Laskowski and Paul Bouley
- Release dates: October 5, 2013 (Woonsocket, Rhode Island)
- Running time: 77 minutes
- Country: United States
- Language: English
- Budget: $200

My Old School is a 2013 historical documentary created by Jason Allard and Scott Gabrielson.

== Plot ==
The film traces in history of the largest abandoned school in New England, located in Woonsocket, Rhode Island. The historic building, constructed in 1914, housed thousands of students over the years as Woonsocket High School, then as Woonsocket Middle School. My Old School features a series of interviews with former teachers, faculty, and city officials along with historical photographs and footage from inside the abandoned school.

The film premiered to a local audience in Woonsocket on October 5, 2013. It premiered on PBS on March 6, 2014.
