= A Noise from the Deep =

1913 silent film by Mack Sennett

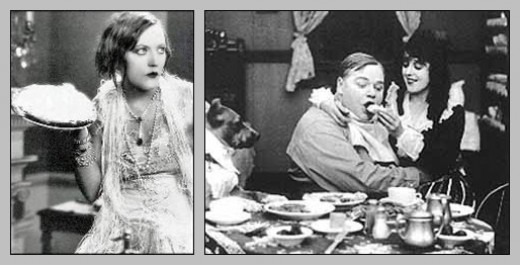
- Film stills
- Directed by: Mack Sennett
- Produced by: Mack Sennett
- Starring: Mabel Normand; Roscoe Arbuckle; The Keystone Cops
- Production company: Keystone Studios
- Distributed by: Mutual Film
- Release date: July 17, 1913
- Running time: 10 minutes
- Country: United States
- Languages: Silent (English intertitles)

A Noise from the Deep is a 1913 American short silent comedy film starring Mabel Normand and Roscoe "Fatty" Arbuckle. The film was directed and produced by Mack Sennett and also features the Keystone Cops on horseback. A Noise from the Deep still exists and was screened four times in 2006 in the Museum of Modern Art in New York City as part of a 56-film retrospective of all known surviving Arbuckle movies.

The film is notable for being the first instance of throwing a custard pie in the face in a film, which was by Normand hitting Arbuckle squarely in the face. The film was also reissued several years after its original release in 1919, under a different title, Fatty's Bubble Trick.

== Plot ==
A pretty girl (Normand), is eloping with a young man for romantic excitement, as much as anything, is accidentally thrown into a pond, and her swain, her father's choice for a son-in-law, unable to swim, is compelled to run for help. Meanwhile, another lover (Arbuckle), appears and saves her.

In gratitude, the girl agrees to go with him to the parson and be married. To make time for the ceremony, a hose is run into the pool, one end being taken behind some bushes on the bank, and a young rustic, in consideration of a quarter, takes his place to blow through it.

The effect is bubbles appearing on the surface of the water, which the rescuing party takes to be coming from the drowning girl, and makes numerous ineffectual attempts to rescue her. By the time the ruse is discovered, the couple are married and all ends happily.

== Cast ==
- Mabel Normand as Mabel
- Roscoe "Fatty" Arbuckle as Bob

Uncredited minor roles

- Charles Avery
- Nick Cogley
- Alice Davenport
- William Hauber
- Charles Inslee
- Edgar Kennedy
- Al St. John

== Production and background ==
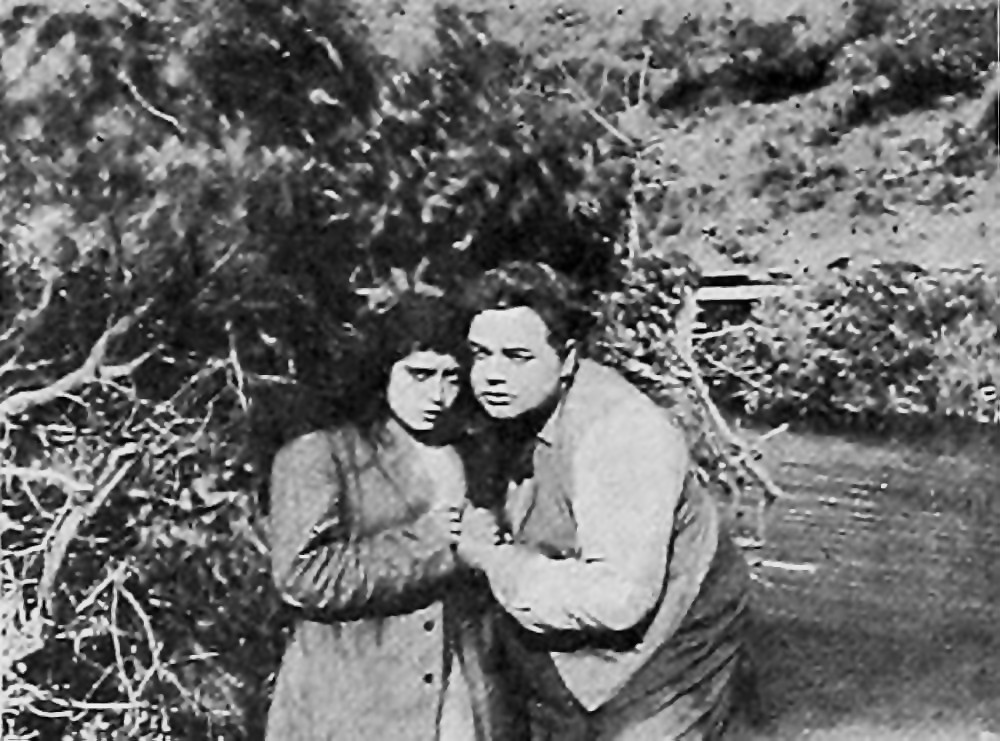
Normand and Arbuckle by the pond

The film was shot from May 31 to June 7, 1913, and released on July 17. The movie was the first pairing of Mabel Normand and Roscoe Arbuckle, and was the first Keystone Comedy to feature a pie in the face by Normand to Arbuckle. To simulate Normand drowning in the pond, the crew created bubbles by placing a hose in the pond and blowing through it.

According to author Andy Edmonds, the idea for the pie throwing came from Arbuckle, who had spotted some pies on a nearby table, and explained to Normand what he wanted to do. Director Sennett was unaware of the conversation, but had been alerted by Arbuckle to "keep a close eye on us, we've got an idea", so Sennett used a wide angle to film the shot, and Normand took a pie and threw it into Arbuckle's face. Sennett loved the gag, and it quickly became a trope of film slapstick.

American film historian Jeanine Basinger opined that "there is something deeply poetic about the fact that the first movie pie was thrown by a woman into the face of a surprised male actor. It's a great feminist statement, the revolt of the pie maker". Author David Yallop wrote that while many pies have been thrown since, according to Gene Fowler, "all of these pie-tossers were mere petits-fours twiddlers" when compared to Arbuckle, who he said was the "greatest pie-slinger of all time", and the "Hercules of the winged dessert".

American film historian Gerald Mast said the custard pies were really made of blackberries, which showed up better on screen. The pies were specially baked for throwing, carefully weighted to permit the maximum accuracy and range. A pâtisserie in Glendale, California, called Greenbergs, made the special pies used in the films, and made a fortune acquiescing to the studio's demands. Laurel and Hardy used 3000 of Greenburg's pies for a street scene in The Battle of the Century.

== Reviews ==
The Bryan Daily Eagle said the film was "positively the funniest comedy ever shown" at the local theater. The Lewiston Sun-Journal claimed: "never since The Runaway Horse has there been a release that has attracted the universal attention for comedy subjects as A Noise from the Deep. This is one of the most remarkable comedy pictures ever manufactured and is being featured wherever it is presented".

The Meriden Morning Record said the film "is one riot of laughter from the very start, and will be held over today and tomorrow so that many may have a chance to see this comedy. Anyone that sees this will agree that the laughs come fast and furious. The Lexington Herald said this is a farce-comedy-burlesque that is a continuous roar, presenting the champion lady diver and star comedienne, Mabel Normand.

The Huntington Herald praised the film, saying it was; an uproarious farce, which beggars description of its acting. The impersonators of the successful suitor and of the constabulary mounted on bucking broncos, make one of the most sidesplitting films seen for many a day. The Crescent Theater in Austin, Texas proclaimed: we can say without fear of contradiction that the comedy we will show on Monday entitled A Noise From the Deep has never been equaled in a laugh producing film in this city.

== See also ==
- List of American films of 1913
- Roscoe Arbuckle filmography
- Mack Sennett filmography
- Silent film

== Sources ==
Books

- Basinger, Jeanine (October 17, 2012). Silent Stars. Knopf Doubleday Publishing Group. p. 132. ISBN 978-0-307-82918-4.
- Burrows, Ian (October 1, 2020). "Slosh". Shakespeare for Snowflakes: On Slapstick and Sympathy. John Hunt Publishing. p. 58. ISBN 978-1-78904-162-0.
- Edmonds, Andy (1991). Frame-Up!: The Untold Story of Roscoe "Fatty" Arbuckle. New York: William Morrow and Company. p. 69. ISBN 0-688-09129-6.
- Massa, Steve (December 10, 2019). Rediscovering Roscoe: The Films of "Fatty" Arbuckle. Bear Manor Media. p. 867.
- Mast, Gerald (September 15, 1979). "Primitives". The Comic Mind: Comedy and the Movies. University of Chicago Press. p. 51. ISBN 978-0-226-50978-5.
- Robertson, Patrick (1994). The New Shell Book of Firsts. London, England: Headline Book Publishing. p. 566. ISBN 0-7472-7818-0.
- Walker, Brent E. (January 13, 2010). Mack Sennett's Fun Factory: A History and Filmography of His Studio and His Keystone and Mack Sennett Comedies, with Biographies of Players and Personnel. McFarland. p. 33. ISBN 978-0-7864-5707-6.
- Yallop, David (October 23, 2014). The Day the Laughter Stopped. Little, Brown Book Group. p. 34. ISBN 978-1-4721-1659-8.

Newspapers

- "Amusements". The Bryan Daily Eagle. Bryan, Texas. August 8, 1913. p. 3.
- "A Noise From The Deep, Keystone Comedy". Lewiston Sun-Journal. Lewiston, Maine. August 4, 1913. p. 7.
- "A Noise From The Deep". Meriden Morning Record. Meriden, Connecticut. July 10, 1914. p. 10.
- "A Noise From The Deep". The Lexington Herald. Lexington, Kentucky. July 27, 1913. p. 6.
- "Pictures Tonight". The Huntington Herald. Huntington, Indiana. August 9, 1913. p. 8.
- "Announcement". Austin American-Statesman. Austin, Texas. September 7, 1913. p. 10.
- Bishop, Jim (December 11, 1981). "Movie Facts and Feats". The Daily News Leader. Staunton, Virginia. p. 4.
