= Indiscretions of Betty =

- Starring: Mabel Normand
- Production company: Vitagraph Company of America
- Distributed by: Vitagraph Company of America
- Release date: March 29, 1910
- Country: United States
- Languages: Silent; English intertitles

Indiscretions of Betty is a 1910 American short silent comedy film released by the Vitagraph Company of America. The film features the first known screen appearance of Mabel Normand. The film's status is currently unknown. Normand followed the film with D. W. Griffith's Her Awakening.
