= Won in a Closet =

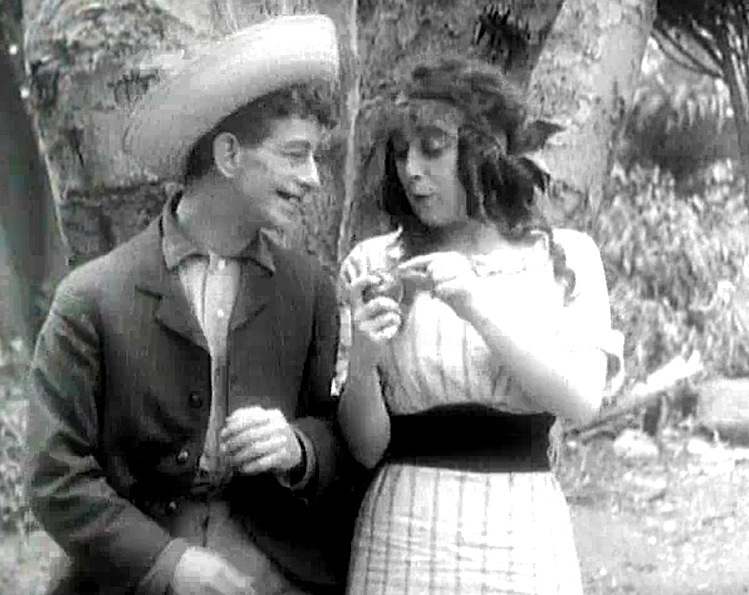
- Scene from the film
- Directed by: Mabel Normand
- Produced by: Mack Sennett
- Starring: Mabel Normand
- Production company: Keystone Film Company
- Distributed by: Mutual Film
- Release date: January 22, 1914
- Running time: 13 minutes
- Country: United States
- Language: Silent (English intertitles)

Won in a Closet (also known as Won in a Cupboard) is a 1914 American one-reel silent comedy film, notable as the second film directed by Mabel Normand.

== Preservation status ==
The film, previously thought to be lost, was discovered in 2010 in New Zealand where it was known as Won in a Cupboard.

== See also ==
- List of rediscovered films
