= Mack at It Again =

- Directed by: Mack Sennett
- Starring: Mabel Normand; Mack Sennett
- Distributed by: Mutual Film
- Release date: April 6, 1914
- Country: United States
- Language: English

Mack at It Again is a 1914 short comedy film starring Mabel Normand and Mack Sennett. Mack Sennett also directed the film. The picture was produced by Sennett's Keystone Film Company and distributed by Mutual Film.
