= The Flirting Husband =

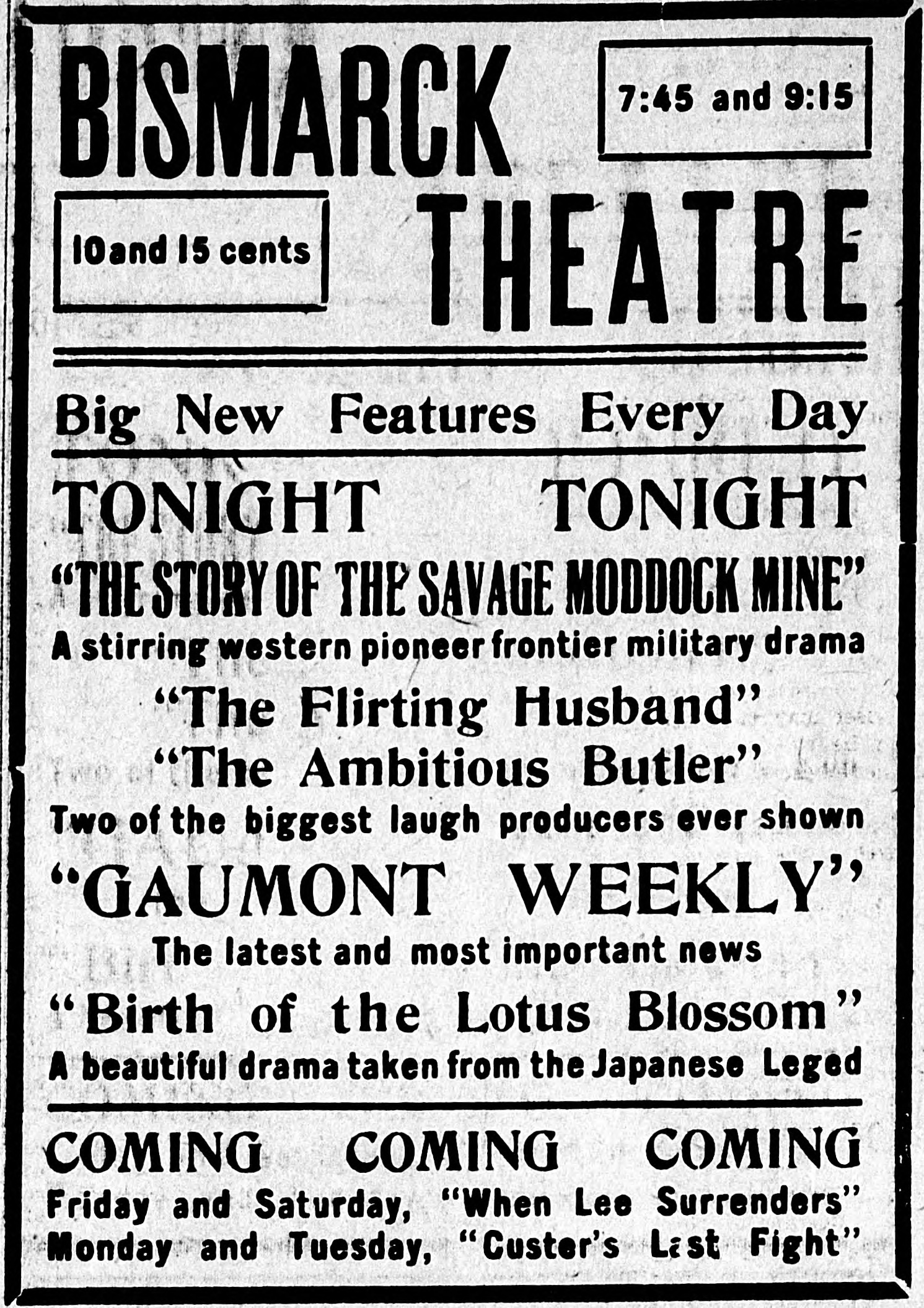
- Contemporary advertisement
- Directed by: Mack Sennett
- Produced by: Mack Sennett
- Starring: Mabel Normand; Ford Sterling
- Production company: Keystone Film Company
- Distributed by: Mutual Film
- Release date: October 21, 1912 (United States)
- Country: United States
- Languages: Silent; English intertitles

The Flirting Husband is a 1912 American short silent comedy film starring Mabel Normand and Ford Sterling. The film was directed and produced by Mack Sennett.

== Cast ==
- Mabel Normand as Mrs. Smith
- Ford Sterling as Mr. Smith
- Fred Mace
- Mack Sennett
