= Mabel's Blunder =

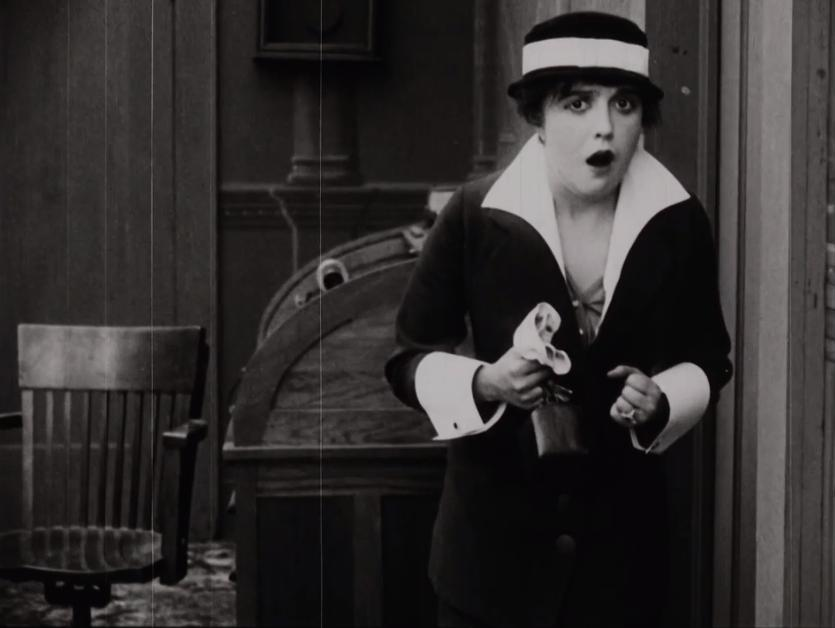
- Mabel Normand in Mabel's Blunder
- Directed by: Mabel Normand
- Written by: Mabel Normand
- Produced by: Mack Sennett
- Starring: Mabel Normand; Charley Chase; Al St. John; Eva Nelson; Charles Bennett; Harry McCoy
- Production company: Keystone Film Company
- Distributed by: Mutual Film
- Release date: August 14, 1914
- Running time: 13 minutes
- Country: United States
- Language: Silent (English intertitles)

Mabel's Blunder (1914) is an American short silent comedy film directed by, written by, and starring Mabel Normand, the most successful of the early silent screen comediennes.

== Plot ==
Mabel's Blunder (1914)

Mabel's Blunder tells the tale of a young woman who is secretly engaged to the boss's son. The young man's sister comes to visit at their office, and a jealous Mabel, not knowing who the visiting woman is, dresses up as a (male) chauffeur to spy on them.

== Production background ==
Produced at Mack Sennett's Keystone Studios, known at the time as "The Fun Factory", Mabel's Blunder showcases Normand's spontaneous and intuitive playfulness and her ability to be both romantically appealing and boisterously funny.

== National Film Registry ==
This film, with its unusual gender-bending aspect, was selected for preservation in the National Film Registry by the Library of Congress in December 2009 for being "culturally, historically or aesthetically" significant.

== Music ==
The film was re-dubbed in 2023 on behalf of the German TV Station ZDF/ARTE. The soundtrack was compiled live by Leipzig-based DJ SilentFilmDj. The film will be available for free on arte.tv till 31 May 2024 as part of the Female Comedies series.

== See also ==
- A Florida Enchantment (1914) cross-dressing comedy directed by and written by Sidney Drew
