= Mabel's Nerve =

- Directed by: George Nichols
- Starring: Mabel Normand
- Distributed by: Keystone Film Company
- Release date: May 16, 1914
- Country: United States
- Languages: Silent film English intertitles

Mabel's Nerve (1914) is a comedy film starring Mabel Normand and directed by George Nichols.
