= Hot Stuff =

Hot Stuff may refer to:

== Film ==
- Hot Stuff (1912 film), a film starring Mabel Normand
- Hot Stuff (1929 film), a film starring Alice White, Louise Fazenda, and William Bakewell
- Hot Stuff (1956 film), a short subject starring the Three Stooges
- Hot Stuff (1971 film), a National Film Board of Canada animated short
- Hot Stuff (1979 film), a film starring Dom DeLuise, Suzanne Pleshette, and Jerry Reed

== Music ==
- Hot Stuff (La Mafia album), 1984
- Hot Stuff, a 1988 album by Buck Clarke
- Hot Stuff (Barbara Dennerlein album), 1991
- "Hot Stuff (Let's Dance)", a 2007 song by Craig David from Trust Me
- "Hot Stuff" (Donna Summer song), a 1979 song from Bad Girls
- "Hot Stuff" (Rolling Stones song) from Black and Blue
- "Hot Stuff" (Koda Kumi song), 2005
- "Hot Stuff", a song by Ashlee Simpson from Bittersweet World
- "Hot Stuff", a song by Whitesnake from Come an' Get It
- "Hot Stuff", a song by Krokus from The Blitz
- "Hot Stuff", a song by Davichi from My Fair Lady

== Other uses ==
- Eddie Gilbert (wrestler) (1961–1995), American wrestler known as "Hot Stuff" Eddie Gilbert
- "Hot Stuff", the 159th episode of Happy Days where the original Arnold's was burned down
- Hot Stuff (aircraft), American aircraft during World War II
- Hot Stuff the Little Devil, a Harvey Comics character
- "Hot Stuff", the 94th episode of Family Matters
