= Should Men Walk Home? =

1927 film

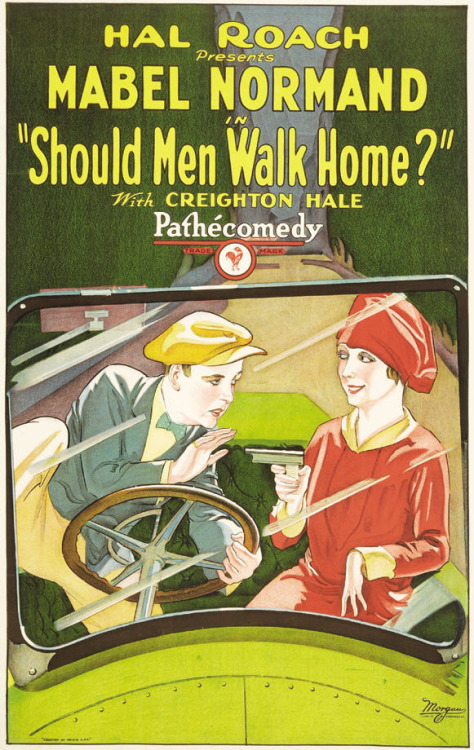
- Film poster
- Directed by: Leo McCarey
- Written by: Albert Austin; Alfred J. Goulding; H. M. Walker
- Produced by: Hal Roach
- Starring: Mabel Normand; Creighton Hale; Eugene Pallette; Oliver Hardy
- Cinematography: Floyd Jackman
- Edited by: Richard C. Currier
- Distributed by: Pathé Exchange
- Release date: January 30, 1927
- Running time: 27 minutes
- Country: United States
- Language: Silent (English intertitles)

Full film

Should Men Walk Home? is a 1927 American short silent comedy film directed by Leo McCarey, starring Mabel Normand and featuring Creighton Hale, Eugene Pallette, and Oliver Hardy.

== Cast ==
- Mabel Normand as The Girl Bandit
- Creighton Hale as The Gentleman Crook
- Eugene Pallette as Detective, Intelligence Bureau
- Oliver Hardy as Party Guest at Punch Bowl
- Edgar Dearing as Motorcycle Cop (uncredited)
- Fay Holderness as The Nurse (uncredited)
- Lyle Tayo as Guest (uncredited)
- Dorothy Coburn as Guest (uncredited)
- L.J. O’Connor as Billionaire (uncredited)
- Clara Guiol as Maid (uncredited)
- F.F. Guenste as Butler (uncredited)
- Charles Meakin as Guest (uncredited)
- Julia Griffith as Guest (uncredited)
- J.H. Wells as Guest (uncredited)
- Floyd Goodman as Guest (uncredited)
- Hal Thompson as Guest (uncredited)
- William A. Boardway as Guest (uncredited)
- Frank Liscom as Guest (uncredited)
- Marie Stapleton as Guest (uncredited)
- Ernest Brinkman as Guest (uncredited)
- Bunne C. Norton as [?] (uncredited)
- Gloria Lee as Normand's Double (uncredited)

== See also ==
- List of American films of 1927
- Oliver Hardy filmography
