= Mabel Normand =

American actress (1893–1930)

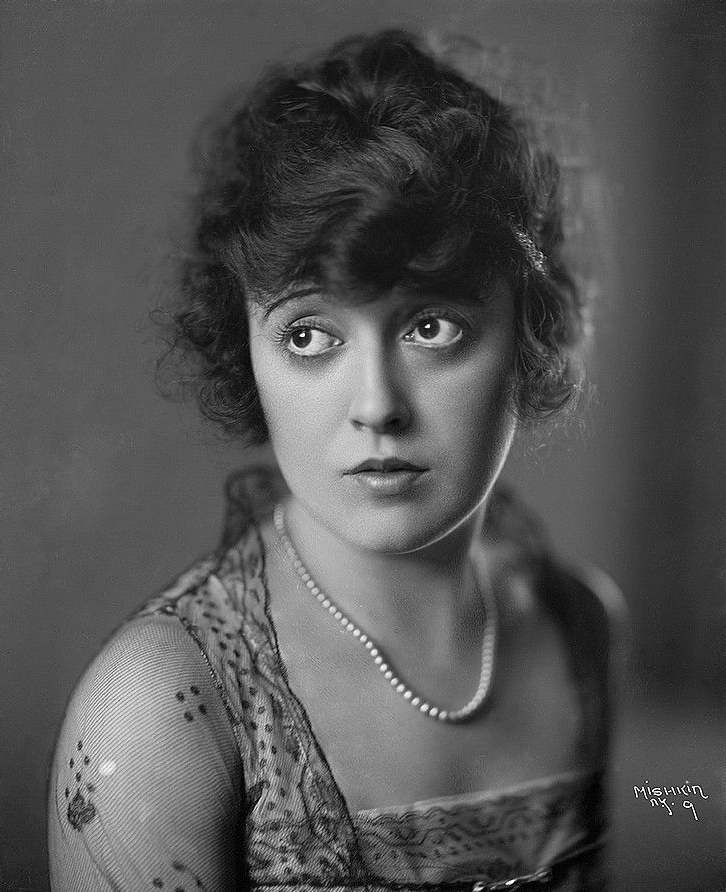
- Normand c. 1920
- Born: Amabel Ethelreid Normand; November 9, 1892; New Brighton, New York, U.S.
- Died: February 23, 1930 (aged 37); Monrovia, California, U.S.
- Resting place: Calvary Cemetery, Los Angeles
- Other names: Mabel Normand-Cody; Muriel Fortescue
- Occupations: Actress; director; screenwriter; comedian
- Years active: 1910–1927
- Spouse: Lew Cody (m. 1926)

Amabel Ethelreid Normand (November 9, 1892 — February 23, 1930), better known as Mabel Normand, was an American silent film actress, comedienne, director and screenwriter. She was a popular star and collaborator of Mack Sennett in their Keystone Studios films, and at the height of her career in the late 1910s and early 1920s had her own film studio and production company, the Mabel Normand Feature Film Company. On screen, she appeared in twelve successful films with Charlie Chaplin and seventeen with Roscoe "Fatty" Arbuckle, sometimes writing and directing (or co-writing and directing) films featuring Chaplin as her leading man.

Normand's name was repeatedly linked with gun violence, including the 1922 murder of her friend, director William Desmond Taylor, and the non-fatal 1924 shooting of Courtland S. Dines by Normand's chauffeur, Joe Kelly. (Note: Entire newspaper headline reads: BLAME JEALOUSY FOR DINES SHOOTING; Los Angeles Police Think the Chauffeur Was Infatuated With Miss Normand. SHE CONTRADICTS HIS STORY Breaks Down From Excitement and Goes to Hospital -- Dines Develops Pneumonia. BLAME JEALOUSY FOR DINES SHOOTING) After police interrogation, she was ruled out as a suspect in Taylor's murder.

Normand was a heavy smoker who may have suffered lung cancer, and/or a recurrence of tuberculosis in 1923, which led to a decline in her health, an early retirement from films in 1926 and her death in 1930 at age 37.

== Early life and career ==
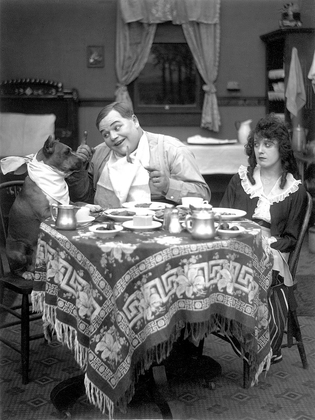
Roscoe Arbuckle and Normand with Luke the Dog in Fatty and Mabel Adrift (1916)

Amabel Ethelreid Normand was born in New Brighton, New York, (before it was incorporated into New York City as part of Staten Island) on November 9, 1892. She took her name from her father's only sibling, who had died before her birth in 1892. Normand's mother, Mary "Minnie" Drury, of Providence, Rhode Island, was of Irish heritage; while her father, Clodman "Claude" George Normand, was French Canadian, with his ancestral lineage dating back to Normandy in France and their surname originally being LeNormand or Le Normand.

For a short time at the start of her career, Normand worked for Vitagraph Studios in New York City for $25 per week (equivalent to $469 in 2024), but Vitagraph founder Albert E. Smith admitted she was one of several actresses about whom he made a mistake in estimating their "potential for future stardom." Normand's intensely beguiling lead performance in the 1911 dramatic short film Her Awakening, directed by D. W. Griffith, drew her attention and led to her meeting director Mack Sennett while at Griffith's Biograph Company. The two subsequently embarked on a relationship. Sennett later brought Normand to California when he founded Keystone Studios in 1912.

In A Little Hero (1913, Dutch-language edition), Collection EYE Film Institute Netherlands

Normand appeared with Charlie Chaplin and Roscoe "Fatty" Arbuckle in many short films. With the 1913 film A Noise from the Deep, Normand is credited as being the first film star to receive a pie thrown in the face. She played a key role in starting Chaplin's film career and acted as his leading lady and mentor in a string of films in 1914, collaborating with him as a director, co-director or co-writer. Chaplin had considerable initial difficulty adjusting to the demands of film acting, and his performance suffered for it. After his first film appearance in Making a Living, Sennett felt he had made a costly mistake. However, Normand persuaded Sennett to give Chaplin another chance, and she and Chaplin appeared together in a dozen subsequent films, almost always as a couple in the lead roles. At the start of 1914, Chaplin first played his Tramp character in Mabel's Strange Predicament, although it wound up being the second Tramp film released; Normand directed Chaplin and herself in the film. Later that year, Normand starred with Chaplin and Marie Dressler in Tillie's Punctured Romance, the first feature-length comedy.

Mabel's Strange Predicament (1914), the first film in which Chaplin plays the Tramp

Normand opened her own film company in partnership with Sennett in 1916, based in Culver City, California. She lost the company in 1918 when its parent company, Triangle Film Corporation, experienced a massive shakeup which also had Sennett lose Keystone Studios and establish his own independent company. In 1918, as her relationship with Sennett came to an end, Normand signed a $3,500-per-week contract (equivalent to $65,595 in 2024) with Samuel Goldwyn. Around that same time, Normand allegedly had a miscarriage (or stillbirth) with Goldwyn's child.

== Scandals ==
=== Roscoe "Fatty" Arbuckle trials ===
Arbuckle, Normand's co-star in many films, was the defendant in three widely publicized trials for manslaughter in the 1921 death of actress Virginia Rappe. Although Arbuckle was acquitted, the scandal damaged his career and his films were banned from exhibition for a short time. Since she had made some of her most notable works with him, much of Normand's output was withheld from the public as a result. Arbuckle later returned to the screen as a director and actor, but did not attain his previous popularity despite being exonerated in court.

=== William Desmond Taylor murder ===
Director William Desmond Taylor formed a close relationship with Normand based on their shared interest in books. Author Robert Giroux claims that Taylor was deeply in love with Normand, who had originally approached him for help in dealing with an alleged cocaine dependency, and that Taylor met with federal prosecutors shortly before his death with an offer to assist them in filing charges against her drug dealers, theorizing that this meeting caused the dealers to hire a contract killer. According to Giroux, Normand suspected the reasons for Taylor's murder but did not know the identity of the man who killed him. According to Kevin Brownlow and John Kobal in their book Hollywood: The Pioneers, the idea that Taylor was murdered by drug dealers was invented by Paramount Studios for publicity purposes. On the night of his murder, February 1, 1922, Normand left Taylor's bungalow at 7:45 pm in a happy mood, carrying a book he had lent her. They blew kisses to each other as her limousine drove away. Normand was the last person known to have seen Taylor alive. The Los Angeles Police Department subjected Normand to a grueling interrogation but ruled her out as a suspect. (Note: New York Times headline reads: Press Film Star For Taylor Clew; Police Conduct 'Long And Grueling' Examination, Working on Jealousy Motive. Mabel Normand Speaks Tells Reporters Affection For Slain Director Was Based on Comradeship, Not 'Love.' A quote from the article reads: A motion picture actress was subjected to what the police termed a "long and grueling" examination at her home here tonight in an attempt to obtain a clue to the murderer of William Desmond Taylor.) Most subsequent writers have done the same. However, Normand's career had already slowed, and her reputation was tarnished. According to George Hopkins, who sat next to her at Taylor's funeral, Normand wept inconsolably.

=== The Dines shooting ===
In 1924, Normand's chauffeur Joe Kelly shot and wounded millionaire oil broker and amateur golfer Courtland S. Dines with her pistol. In response, several theaters pulled Normand's films, which were also banned in Ohio by the state film censorship board. However, Dines was not fatally injured; he died of a heart attack in 1945, over two decades after the shooting.

== Later career and death ==
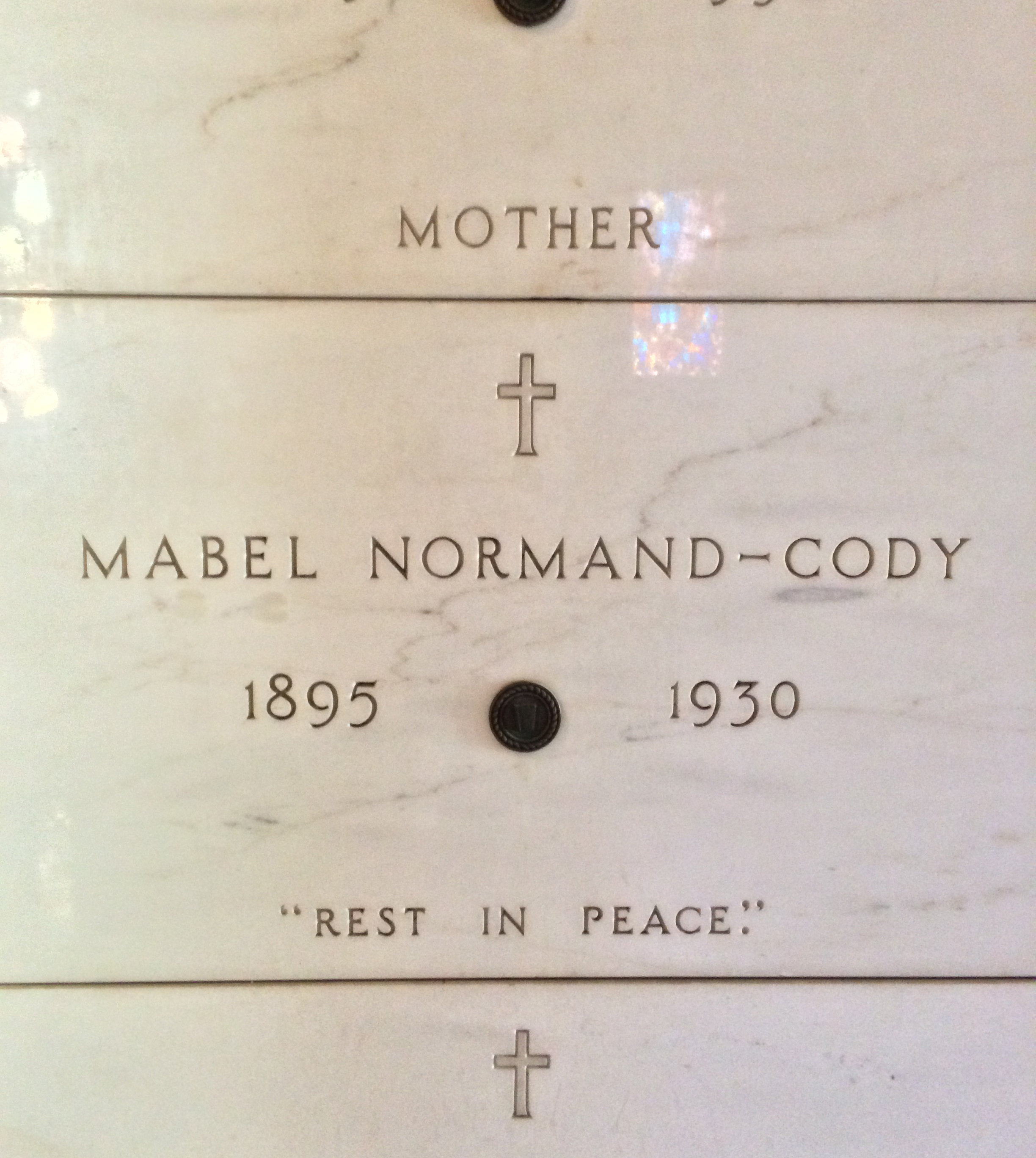
Normand's crypt at Calvary Cemetery

Normand continued her film career and joined Hal Roach Studios in 1926 after conversations with director and producer F. Richard Jones, who had previously worked with her at Keystone. The films she made at Roach included Raggedy Rose, The Nickel-Hopper, and One Hour Married — the latter being her last film—all co-written alongside Stan Laurel. In another Roach film, she was directed by Leo McCarey in the film Should Men Walk Home?

On 17 September 1926, she married actor Lew Cody, with whom she had appeared in Mickey in 1918. They lived separately in nearby houses in Beverly Hills. Normand's health was in decline due to tuberculosis. After an extended stay in Pottenger Sanitorium in Monrovia, California, she died there from pulmonary tuberculosis on February 23, 1930, at the age of 37. She was interred as Mabel Normand-Cody at Calvary Cemetery, Los Angeles. The date of birth listed on her crypt is incorrect. Her mother was buried in the crypt above.

== Legacy ==
"We used to go to the park with a stepladder, a bucket of whitewash, and Mabel Normand, and make a picture." — Charlie Chaplin, recalling the early days of silent filmmaking.

Normand has a star on the Hollywood Walk of Fame for her contributions to motion pictures at 6821 Hollywood Boulevard.

Her film Mabel's Blunder (1914) was added to the National Film Registry in December 2009.

In June 2010, the New Zealand Film Archive reported the discovery of a print of Normand's film Won in a Closet (exhibited in New Zealand under its alternate title Won in a Cupboard), a short comedy previously believed lost. This film is a significant discovery, as Normand directed the film and starred in the lead role, displaying her talents on both sides of the camera.

In 2025, Mabel Normand was announced as an inductee in the Visual Effects Society Hall of Fame.

== Cultural references ==
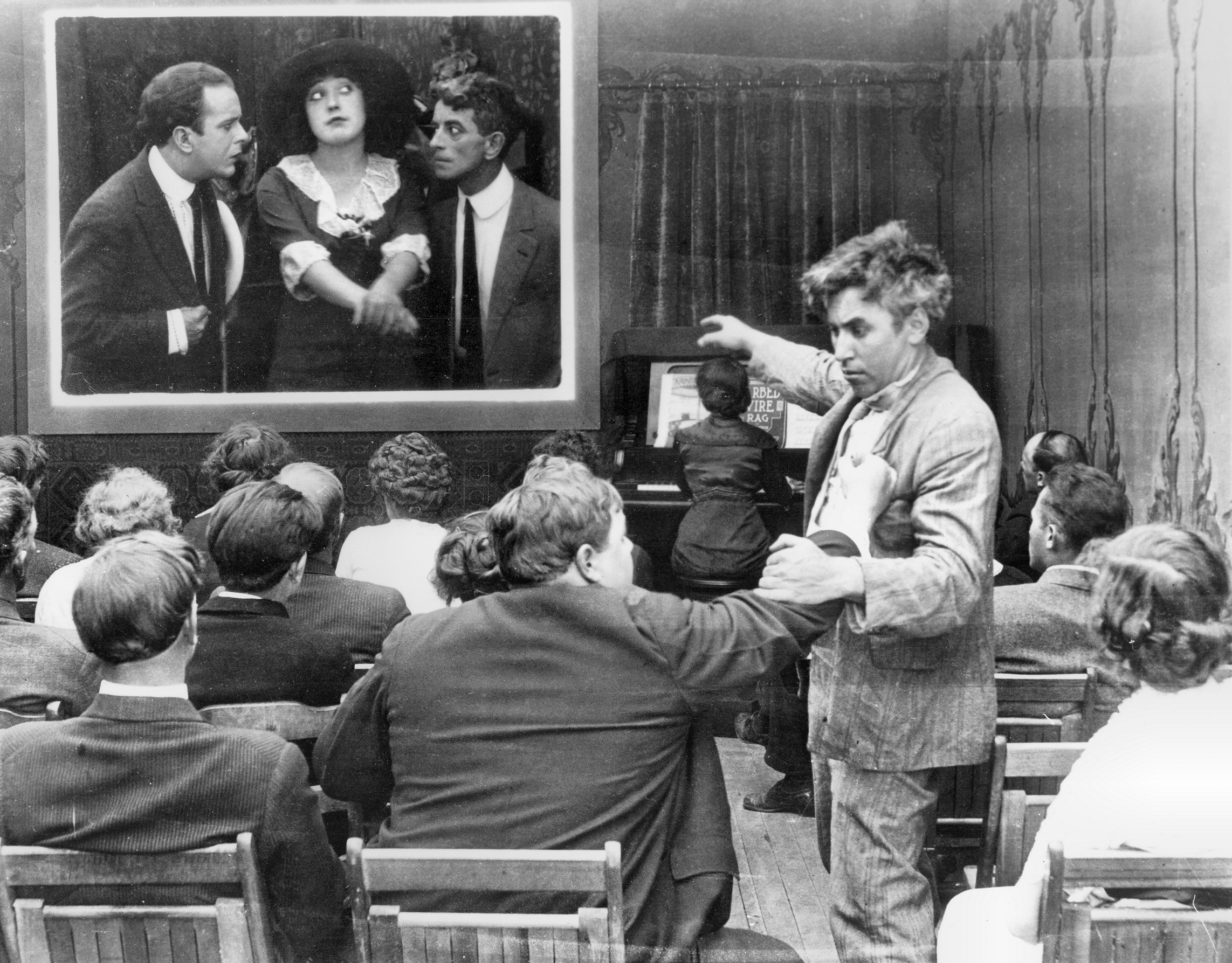
Moviegoers Roscoe Arbuckle and Mack Sennett (foreground) argue while watching Normand onscreen in Mabel's Dramatic Career (1913)

- A nod to Normand's celebrity in early Hollywood came through the name of a leading character in the 1950 film Sunset Boulevard, "Norma Desmond", which has been cited as a combination of the names Mabel Normand and William Desmond Taylor. The film also frequently mentions Normand by name.
- Normand is mentioned during series 2 episode 1 of Downton Abbey by ambitious housemaid Ethel Parks. Daisy Mason (née Robinson), the kitchen maid, inquires what she is reading, and Ethel responds, "Photoplay about Normand. She was nothing when she started, you know. Her father was a carpenter and they had no money, and now she's a shining film star."
- Singer-songwriter Stevie Nicks wrote a song about the actress titled "Mabel Normand", which appears on her 2014 album 24 Karat Gold: Songs from the Vault.

=== Fictional portrayals ===
The 1974 Broadway musical Mack & Mabel (Michael Stewart and Jerry Herman) fictionalized the romance between Normand and Mack Sennett. Normand was played by Bernadette Peters and Robert Preston portrayed Sennett.

Normand is played by actress Marisa Tomei in the 1992 film Chaplin opposite Robert Downey, Jr. as Charles Chaplin; by Penelope Lagos in the first biopic about Normand's life, a 35-minute dramatic short film entitled Madcap Mabel (2010); and by Morganne Picard in the motion picture Return to Babylon (2013).

In 2014, Normand was played on television by Andrea Deck in series 2, episode 8 of Mr Selfridge and by Kristina Thompson in the short film Mabel's Dressing Room.

The character played by Alice Faye in Hollywood Cavalcade (1939) was reputed to have been based partly on Normand.

== Filmography ==
Some of her early roles are credited as "Mabel Fortesque".

Key
†	Denotes a lost or presumed lost film.

=== Vitagraph ===
Year	Film	Role	Director	Co-Star	Notes
1910	Indiscretions of Betty †				
1910	Over the Garden Wall †				
1911	Fate's Turning	A Diner At The Hotel	D. W. Griffith		
1911	The Diamond Star †	Guest At Dinner Party			
1911	A Tale of Two Cities	Uncredited	William J. Humphrey		
1911	Betty Becomes a Maid †	Betty			
1911	Troublesome Secretaries	Betty Harding	Ralph Ince		
1911	Picciola; or, The Prison Flower †	Theresa Girhardi			
1911	His Mother †	Donald's Fiancée			
1911	When a Man's Married His Trouble Begins †	Mabel - Jack's Wife		James Morrison	
1911	A Dead Man's Honor †	Helen			
1911	The Changing of Silas Warner †				
1911	Two Overcoats †				
1911	The Subduing of Mrs. Nag †	Miss Prue	George D. Baker		
1911	The Strategy of Anne †		George D. Baker		
1911	The Diving Girl †	The Niece	Mack Sennett	Fred Mace	
1911	How Betty Won the School †	Betty's Rival		Edith Storey	
1911	The Baron †	The Heiress	Mack Sennett	Dell Henderson	

=== Biograph ===
Year	Film	Role	Director	Co-Star	Notes
1911	The Squaw's Love	Wild Flower	D. W. Griffith	Alfred Paget	
1911	The Revenue Man and the Girl		D. W. Griffith	Dorothy West	
1911	Her Awakening	The Daughter	D. W. Griffith	Harry Hyde	
1911	The Making of a Man †	In Second Audience	D. W. Griffith	Dell Henderson	
1911	Italian Blood †		D. W. Griffith	Charles West	
1911	The Unveiling †	The Showgirl	D. W. Griffith	Robert Harron	
1911	Through His Wife's Picture †	Wifey	Mack Sennett	Fred Mace	
1911	The Inventor's Secret †		Mack Sennett	Mack Sennett	
1911	A Victim of Circumstances †		Mack Sennett	Fred Mace	
1911	Their First Divorce Case †	Hubby's Chorine Sweetheart	Mack Sennett		Uncredited; Unconfirmed
1911	Why He Gave Up †	The Wife	Henry Lehrman; Mack Sennett	Fred Mace	
1911	Saved from Himself		D. W. Griffith		
1912	The Joke on the Joker †		Mack Sennett		
1912	The Engagement Ring †		Mack Sennett		
1912	The Eternal Mother	Mary	D. W. Griffith	Edwin August; Blanche Sweet	
1912	Did Mother Get Her Wish? †		Mack Sennett		
1912	Pants and Pansies †		Mack Sennett	Harry McCoy	
1912	The Mender of Nets		D. W. Griffith	Mary Pickford	
1912	The Fatal Chocolate †		Mack Sennett	Mack Sennett	
1912	Hot Stuff		Mack Sennett	Mack Sennett	
1912	A Voice From The Deep †		Mack Sennett		
1912	Oh, Those Eyes! †		Mack Sennett		
1912	Help! Help! †	Mrs. Suburbanite	Mack Sennett	Fred Mace	
1912	The Brave Hunter †		Mack Sennett		
1912	The Fickle Spaniard		Mack Sennett		
1912	The Furs †		Mack Sennett		
1912	When Kings Were The Law	(Uncredited)	D.W. Griffith		
1912	Helen's Marriage	Helen	Mack Sennett; Dell Henderson		
1912	Tomboy Bessie	Bessie	Mack Sennett	Mack Sennett	
1912	Katchem Kate		Mack Sennett	Fred Mace; Jack Pickford	
1912	Neighbors †		Mack Sennett		
1912	A Dash Through the Clouds		Mack Sennett		
1912	The New Baby †		Mack Sennett		
1912	The Tourists †		Mack Sennett		
1912	What The Doctor Ordered †		Mack Sennett		
1912	An Interrupted Elopement		Mack Sennett		
1912	Tragedy of a Dress Suit †		Mack Sennett		
1912	He Must Have a Wife †		Mack Sennett		

=== Keystone ===
Year	Film	Role	Director	Co-Star	Notes
1912	Cohen Collects a Debt		Mack Sennett	Ford Sterling	
1912	The Water Nymph	Diving Venus	Mack Sennett	Mack Sennett; Ford Sterling	Alternative title: The Beach Flirt; First Keystone comedy
1912	The New Neighbor †		Mack Sennett		
1912	Riley and Schultz		Mack Sennett		
1912	The Beating He Needed †		Mack Sennett	Fred Mace; Ford Sterling	
1912	Pedro's Dilemma †		Mack Sennett	Mack Sennett; Fred Mace; Ford Sterling	
1912	Ambitious Butler †		Mack Sennett	Mack Sennett; Fred Mace; Ford Sterling	
1912	The Flirting Husband †	Mrs. Smith	Mack Sennett	Ford Sterling	
1912	At Coney Island †	The Girl	Mack Sennett	Ford Sterling; Fred Mace	Alternative title: Cohen at Coney Island
1912	At It Again †	Mrs. Smith	Mack Sennett	Mack Sennett; Fred Mace; Ford Sterling	
1912	Mabel's Lovers †	Mabel	Mack Sennett	Fred Mace; Ford Sterling; Alice Davenport	
1912	The Deacon's Troubles †		Mack Sennett	Fred Mace; Ford Sterling	
1912	A Temperamental Husband †	Gladys	Mack Sennett	Fred Mace; Ford Sterling	
1912	Mr. Fix-It	Mabel	Mack Sennett		
1912	The Rivals †	Mabel	Mack Sennett		
1912	A Desperate Lover †		Mack Sennett	Fred Mace	
1912	Brown's Séance †	Mrs. Brown	Fred Mace	Fred Mace; Alice Davenport	
1912	Pat's Day Off †	Bridget, Pat's Wife	Mack Sennett	Fred Mace; Alice Davenport; Ford Sterling	
1912	A Family Mixup †	A Wife	Mack Sennett	Mack Sennett; Fred Mace	
1912	A Midnight Elopement †		Mack Sennett		
1912	Mabel's Adventures	Mabel	Mack Sennett	Fred Mace; Ford Sterling	
1912	The Drummer's Vacation †		Mack Sennett		
1912	The Duel †	Mabel	Mack Sennett		
1912	Mabel's Stratagem	Mabel	Mack Sennett	Fred Mace; Alice Davenport; Mack Sennett	
1912	Kings Court †				
1913	The Bangville Police	Farm Girl	Henry Lehrman	Fred Mace the Keystone Cops	
1913	A Noise from the Deep	Mabel	Mack Sennett	Roscoe Arbuckle the Keystone Cops	
1913	A Little Hero		George Nichols		
1913	Mabel's Awful Mistakes †	Mabel	Mack Sennett	Mack Sennett; Ford Sterling	Alternative title: Her Deceitful Lover
1913	Passions, He Had Three †		Henry Lehrman	Roscoe Arbuckle	Alternative title: He Had Three
1913	For the Love of Mabel †	Mabel	Henry Lehrman	Roscoe Arbuckle; Ford Sterling	
1913	Mabel's Dramatic Career	Mabel, the kitchen maid	Mack Sennett	Mack Sennett; Ford Sterling	Alternative title: Her Dramatic Debut
1913	The Gypsy Queen †		Mack Sennett	Roscoe Arbuckle	
1913	Cohen Saves the Flag	Rebecca	Mack Sennett	Ford Sterling	
1914	Mabel's Stormy Love Affair †	Mabel	Mabel Normand	Alice Davenport	
1914	Won in a Closet		Mabel Normand		Alternative title: Won in a Cupboard
1914	In the Clutches of the Gang †			Roscoe Arbuckle; Keystone Cops	
1914	Mack at It Again †		Mack Sennett	Mack Sennett	
1914	Mabel's Strange Predicament	Mabel	Mabel Normand	Charles Chaplin	Alternative title: Hotel Mixup; First film with Chaplin as the Tramp although the second released.
1914	Mabel's Blunder	Mabel	Mabel Normand	Charley Chase; Al St. John	Added to the National Film Registry in 2009
1914	A Film Johnnie	Mabel	George Nichols	Charles Chaplin; Roscoe Arbuckle	
1914	Mabel at the Wheel	Mabel	Mabel Normans; Mack Sennett	Charles Chaplin	
1914	Caught in a Cabaret	Mabel	Mabel Normand	Charles Chaplin	Writer
1914	Mabel's Nerve †	Mabel	George Nichols		
1914	The Alarm †		Roscoe Arbuckle; Edward Dillon	Roscoe Arbuckle; Minta Durfee	Alternative title: Fireman's Picnic
1914	Her Friend the Bandit †	Mabel	Mabel Normand; Charles Chaplin	Charles Chaplin	
1914	The Fatal Mallet	Mabel	Mack Sennett	Charles Chaplin; Mack Sennett	
1914	Mabel's Busy Day	Mabel	Mabel Normand	Charles Chaplin; Chester Conklin	Writer
1914	Mabel's Married Life	Mabel	Charles Chaplin	Charles Chaplin	Co-written by Normand and Chaplin
1914	Mabel's New Job †	Mabel	Mabel Normand; George Nichols	Chester Conklin; Charley Chase	Writer
1914	The Sky Pirate †		Roscoe Arbuckle	Roscoe Arbuckle; Minta Durfee	
1914	The Masquerader	Actress	Charles Chaplin		Uncredited
1914	Mabel's Latest Prank †	Mabel	Mabel Normand; Mack Sennett	Mack Sennett; Hank Mann	Alternative title: Touch of Rheumatism
1914	Hello, Mabel	Mabel	Mabel Normand	Charley Chase; Minta Durfee	Alternative title: On a Busy Wire
1914	Gentlemen of Nerve	Mabel	Charles Chaplin	Charles Chaplin; Chester Conklin	Alternative titles: Charlie at the Races; Some Nerve
1914	His Trysting Place	Mabel, The Wife	Charles Chaplin	Charles Chaplin	
1914	Shotguns That Kick †		Roscoe Arbuckle	Roscoe Arbuckle; Al St. John	
1914	Getting Acquainted	Ambrose's Wife	Charles Chaplin	Charles Chaplin; Phyllis Allen	
1914	Tillie's Punctured Romance	Mabel	Mack Sennett	Marie Dressler; Charles Chaplin	Feature-Length film First feature-length comedy
1915	Mabel and Fatty's Wash Day	Mabel	Roscoe Arbuckle	Roscoe Arbuckle	
1915	Fatty and Mabel's Simple Life	Mabel	Roscoe Arbuckle	Roscoe Arbuckle	Alternative title: Mabel and Fatty's Simple Life
1915	Mabel and Fatty Viewing the World's Fair at San Francisco	Mabel	Mabel Normand; Roscoe Arbuckle	Roscoe Arbuckle	
1915	Mabel and Fatty's Married Life	Mabel	Roscoe Arbuckle	Roscoe Arbuckle	
1915	That Little Band of Gold	Wifey	Roscoe Arbuckle		Uncredited; Alternative title: For Better or Worse
1915	Wished on Mabel	Mabel	Mabel Normand	Roscoe Arbuckle	
1915	Mabel's Wilful Way	Mabel	Roscoe Arbuckle	Roscoe Arbuckle	
1915	Mabel Lost and Won	Mabel	Mabel Normand	Owen Moore; Mack Swain	
1915	The Little Teacher	The Little Teacher	Mack Sennett	Roscoe Arbuckle, Mack Sennett	Alternative title: A Small Town Bully
1916	Fatty and Mabel Adrift	Mabel	Roscoe Arbuckle	Roscoe Arbuckle; Al St. John	Alternative title: Concrete Biscuits
1916	He Did and He Didn't	The Doctor's Wife	Roscoe Arbuckle	Roscoe Arbuckle; Al St. John	

=== Goldwyn Feature films ===
Year	Film	Role	Director	Co-Star	Notes
1918	Dodging a Million †	Arabella Flynn	George Loane Tucker	Tom Moore	
1918	The Floor Below	Patricia O'Rourke	Clarence G. Badger	Tom Moore	
1918	Joan of Plattsburg †	Joan	George Loane Tucker		
1918	Back to the Woods †	Stephanie Trent	George Irving	Herbert Rawlinson	
1918	Peck's Bad Girl †	Minnie Penelope Peck	Charles Giblyn	Earle Foxe	
1918	The Venus Model †	Kitty O'Brien	Clarence G. Badger	Rod La Rocque	
1918	A Perfect 36 †	Mabel	Charles Giblyn	Rod La Rocque	
1918	Mickey	Mickey	F. Richard Jones; James Young		Produced by the Mabel Normand Feature Film Company and distributed by Film Booking Offices of America rather than Goldwyn
1919	Sis Hopkins †	Sis Hopkins	Clarence G. Badger	John Bowers	
1919	When Doctors Disagree	Millie Martin	Victor Schertzinger	Walter Hiers	
1919	Upstairs †	Elsie MacFarland	Victor Schertzinger	Cullen Landis	
1919	Jinx †	The Jinx	Victor Schertzinger		
1919	The Pest †	Jigs	Christy Cabanne		
1920	Pinto †	Pinto	Victor Schertzinger	Cullen Landis	
1920	What Happened to Rosa	Rosa	Victor Schertzinger		
1920	The Slim Princess †	Princess Kalora	Victor Schertzinger	Tully Marshall	
1921	Molly O'	Molly O'	F. Richard Jones	George Nichols	Produced by Mack Sennett
1922	Oh, Mabel Behave	Innkeeper's Daughter	Mack Sennett	Mack Sennett; Ford Sterling	Filmed in 1915 or 1916, produced by Triangle Film Corporation
1922	Head over Heels	Tina	Paul Bern; Victor Schertzinger	Raymond Hatton; Adolphe Menjou	
1923	Suzanna	Suzanna	F. Richard Jones	George Nichols	Incomplete, two reels are missing Produced by Mack Sennett
1923	The Extra Girl	Sue Graham	F. Richard Jones	George Nichols	Produced by Mack Sennett

=== Hal Roach Studios ===
Year	Film	Role	Director	Co-Star	Notes
1926	Raggedy Rose	Raggedy Rose	Richard Wallace	Carl Miller; Max Davidson	Feature-length film
1926	The Nickel-Hopper	Paddy, the nickel hopper	F. Richard Jones; Hal Yates		
1927	Should Men Walk Home?	The Girl Bandit	Leo McCarey	Eugene Pallette; Oliver Hardy	
1927	One Hour Married †		Jerome Strong	Creighton Hale; James Finlayson	

== Bibliography ==
- Basinger, Jeanine (2000). Silent Stars. Wesleyan University Press. ISBN 978-0-8195-6451-1.
- Brownlow, Kevin; Kobal, John (1979). Hollywood: The Pioneers. Collins. ISBN 978-0-00-216047-6.
- Chaplin, Charles (1964). Charles Chaplin: My Autobiography. Penguin. p. 149.
- Giroux, Robert (1990). A Deed of Death: The Story Behind the Unsolved Murder of Hollywood Director William Desmond Taylor. Alfred A. Knopf. p. 232. ISBN 0394580753.
- Harper Fussell, Betty (1992). Mabel: Hollywood's First I-Don't-Care Girl (Illustrated ed.). Limelight Editions. ISBN 978-0-87910-158-9.
- Higham, Charles (2006). Murder in Hollywood: Solving a Silent Screen Mystery. Terrace Books. ISBN 978-0299203641.
- Jacobs, Christophe P.; McCaffrey, Donald (September 30, 1999). Guide to the Silent Years of American Cinema. Bloomsbury Publishing USA. ISBN 978-0-313-03217-2.
- Lefler, Timothy Dean (2016). Mabel Normand: The Life and Career of a Hollywood Madcap. McFarland. ISBN 978-0786478675.
- Lowe, Denise (2005). An Encyclopedic Dictionary of Women in Early American Films, 1895-1930. Haworth Press. ISBN 978-0-7890-1842-7.
- Milton, Joyce (1998). Tramp: The Life of Charlie Chaplin. Da Capo Press. p. 221. ISBN 0-306-80831-5.
- Sherman, William Thomas (January 10, 2019). Mabel Normand: A Source Book to Her Life and Films (8th ed.). Independently Published. ISBN 978-1-7938-4534-4.
- Smith, Albert E. (1952). Two Reels and a Crank. Doubleday.
- Staggs, Sam (April 20, 2002). Close-up on Sunset Boulevard: Billy Wilder, Norma Desmond, and the Dark Hollywood Dream. Macmillan. ISBN 978-0-312-27453-5.
- Vogel, Michelle (2007). Olive Thomas: The Life and Death of a Silent Film Beauty. McFarland. p. 9. ISBN 978-0-7864-2908-0.
- Wagenknecht, Edward (1962). The Movies in the Age of Innocence. Norman, Oklahoma: University of Oklahoma Press.
- Ward Mahar, Karen (2006). Women Filmmakers in Early Hollywood. JHU Press. p. 131. ISBN 0-8018-8436-5.
