= Mabel's Dramatic Career =

1913 film

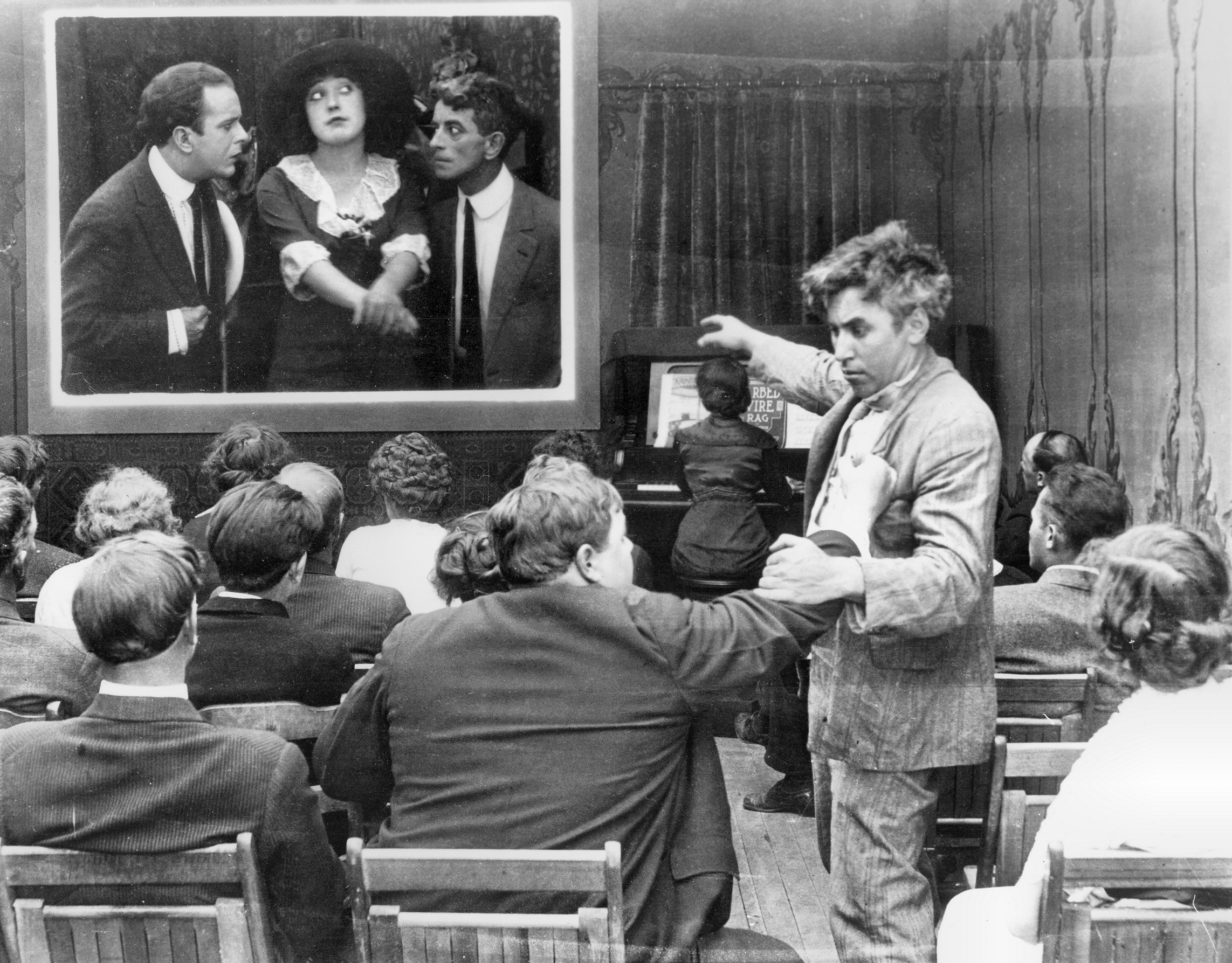
- Mabel Normand and Mack Sennett in the film. Image courtesy Orange County Archives.
- Directed by: Mack Sennett
- Produced by: Mack Sennett
- Starring: Mabel Normand; Mack Sennett; Ford Sterling; The Keystone Cops
- Distributed by: Keystone Studios
- Release date: September 8, 1913
- Running time: 14 minutes
- Country: United States
- Languages: Silent; English intertitles

Mabel's Dramatic Career is a 1913 American silent short comedy film starring Mabel Normand and Mack Sennett while featuring Roscoe Arbuckle in a cameo. The movie features a film within a film and uses multiple exposure to show a film being projected in a cinema.

== Plot ==
Mack, a rube from the sticks, travels to the city and learns that his former girlfriend, Mabel the kitchen maid, has made it big in the moving pictures. He disrupts a showing of her latest film when he mistakes what's happening on screen with real life.

== Cast ==
The cast includes:

- Mabel Normand as Mabel, the kitchen maid
- Mack Sennett as Mack
- Alice Davenport as Mack's mother
- Virginia Kirtley as Mabel's rival
- Charles Avery as Farmer
- Ford Sterling as Actor/Onscreen villain
- Roscoe Arbuckle as Man in cinema audience
- Billy Jacobs as Mabel's son (as Paul Jacobs)
- Charles Inslee as Film Director
- The Keystone Cops

== See also ==
- Roscoe Arbuckle filmography
