= Mabel's Stormy Love Affair =

- Directed by: Mabel Normand
- Produced by: Mack Sennett
- Starring: Mabel Normand
- Distributed by: Mutual Film
- Release date: 1914
- Country: United States
- Language: English

Mabel's Stormy Love Affair is a 1914 film directed by and starring Mabel Normand, and produced by Mack Sennett.

== Cast ==
- Mabel Normand
- Harry McCoy

== Production ==
Mabel's Stormy Love Affair was filmed in late 1913 and was Normand’s directorial debut.

== Legacy ==
Brent Walker notes that "Mabel Normand was the first Keystone star to have her first name used in the film's title, in films such as Mabel's Stormy Love Affair (1914).’’

== Bibliography ==
- Fussell, Betty (1988). "The Films of Mabel Normand". Film History. 2 (4): 373–391. JSTOR 3815153.
- Mugno, Christina Marie (1998). The cinema of Mabel Normand (Thesis). OCLC 46697321. ProQuest 304454441.
