= Shotguns That Kick =

- Directed by: Roscoe Arbuckle
- Produced by: Mack Sennett
- Starring: Roscoe Arbuckle; Mabel Normand; Al St. John
- Distributed by: Mutual Film
- Release date: December 3, 1914
- Country: United States

Shotguns That Kick is a 1914 comedy short starring Roscoe "Fatty" Arbuckle, Mabel Normand, and Arbuckle's acrobatic nephew Al St. John. The film was directed by Arbuckle.

== Cast ==
- Roscoe "Fatty" Arbuckle
- Edward Dillon - (as Eddie Dillon)
- Mabel Normand
- Al St. John

== See also ==
- List of American films of 1914
- Fatty Arbuckle filmography
