= Mabel's Awful Mistakes =

- Directed by: Mack Sennett
- Produced by: Mack Sennett
- Starring: Mabel Normand; Mack Sennett; Ford Sterling; Edgar Kennedy
- Distributed by: Mutual Film
- Release date: 1913
- Country: United States
- Language: English

Mabel's Awful Mistakes is a 1913 film starring Mabel Normand and directed by Mack Sennett. The film also features Mack Sennett, Ford Sterling and Edgar Kennedy.
