= Mabel's Latest Prank =

- Directed by: Mabel Normand; Mack Sennett
- Produced by: Mack Sennett
- Starring: Mabel Normand; Mack Sennett
- Distributed by: Mutual Film
- Release date: 1914
- Country: United States
- Languages: Silent film English intertitles

Mabel's Latest Prank is a 1914 film both starring and co-directed by Mabel Normand and Mack Sennett.

== Cast ==
- Mabel Normand
- Mack Sennett
- Hank Mann
- Slim Summerville
