= The Fatal Mallet =

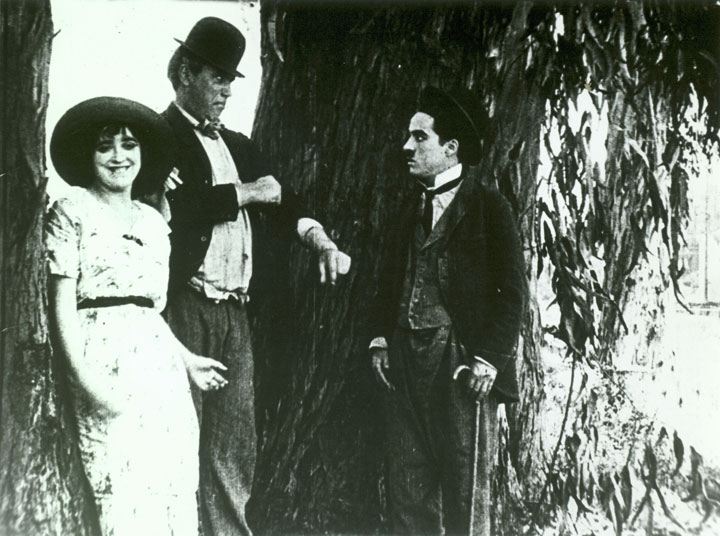
- Mabel Normand, Mack Sennett, and Charlie Chaplin
- Directed by: Mack Sennett
- Written by: Mack Sennett
- Produced by: Mack Sennett
- Starring: Charlie Chaplin; Mabel Normand; Mack Sennett
- Cinematography: Frank D. Williams
- Distributed by: Keystone Studios
- Release date: June 1, 1914
- Running time: 18 minutes
- Country: United States
- Languages: Silent; English (original titles)

The Fatal Mallet

The Fatal Mallet is a 1914 American silent short comedy film starring Charlie Chaplin and Mabel Normand. The film was written and directed by Mack Sennett, who also portrays one of Chaplin's rivals for Normand's attention. (Sennett and Normand were off-screen lovers during this period.)

The Fatal Mallet is one of more than a dozen early films that writer/director/comedian Mabel Normand made with Charles Chaplin; Normand, who had written and directed films before Chaplin, mentored the young comedian.

== Plot ==
Three men will fight for the love of a charming girl. A Suitor and a Rival Suitor teams up against the third, and play dirty, throwing bricks and using a mallet. However, the Suitor double-crosses his partner, thus losing his trust and the girl in the end.

== Cast ==
- Charlie Chaplin - Suitor
- Mabel Normand - Mabel
- Mack Sennett - Rival suitor
- Mack Swain - Another rival

== Reviews ==
A reviewer for Moving Picture World said of The Fatal Mallet, "This one-reeler proves that hitting people over the head with bricks and mallets can sometimes be made amusing."

A reviewer for Bioscope positively wrote, "Though rivals in love for the beautiful Mabel Normand, Charles Chaplin and Mack Sennett combine to rid themselves of a third poacher on their preserves, and the employment of a deadly mallet gives these indescribable comedians the opportunity for another genuinely funny farce."

== See also ==
- List of American films of 1914
- Charlie Chaplin filmography
