= Madcap Mabel =

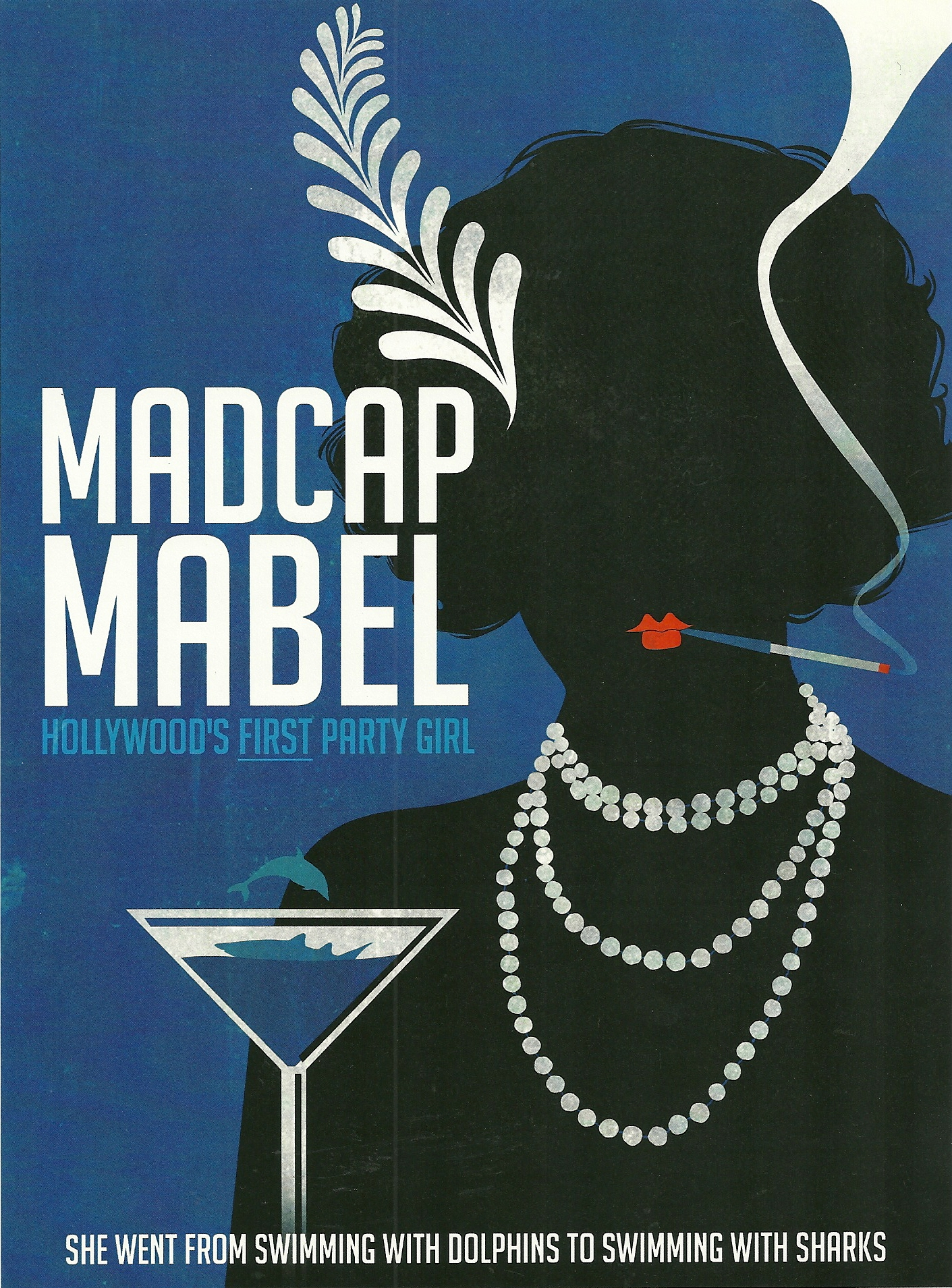
- Poster for the film
- Directed by: Dena Schumacher
- Written by: Rudy Cecera
- Starring: Penelope Lagos; Rudy Cecera
- Release date: February 2010 (Yperia Film Festival)
- Running time: 35 minutes
- Country: United States
- Language: English

Madcap Mabel is a 2010 dramatic 35-minute short film about a guilty reporter (played by Rudy Cecera) who had helped sensationalize the scandals that damaged the career of dying silent film comedian/writer/director Mabel Normand (Penelope Lagos). The film depicts another of Charles Chaplin's leading ladies, Edna Purviance (Katie Maguire), as well as Normand's lover Mack Sennett (Ron Nummi) and young reporter Adela Rogers St. Johns (Elise Rovinsky), and was written by Cecera and directed by Dena Schumacher.

== Cast ==
- Penelope Lagos as Mabel Normand
- Rudy Cecera as Charlie Craig
- Katie Maguire as Edna Purviance
- Ron Nummi as Mack Sennett
- Ian Blackman as Hamilton Perry
- Brian Linden as William Desmond Taylor
- Elise Rovinsky as Adela Rogers St. Johns
- Elizabeth C. Taylor as Julia Benson
- Molly Maguire as Mae Busch
