= The Nickel-Hopper =

1926 film

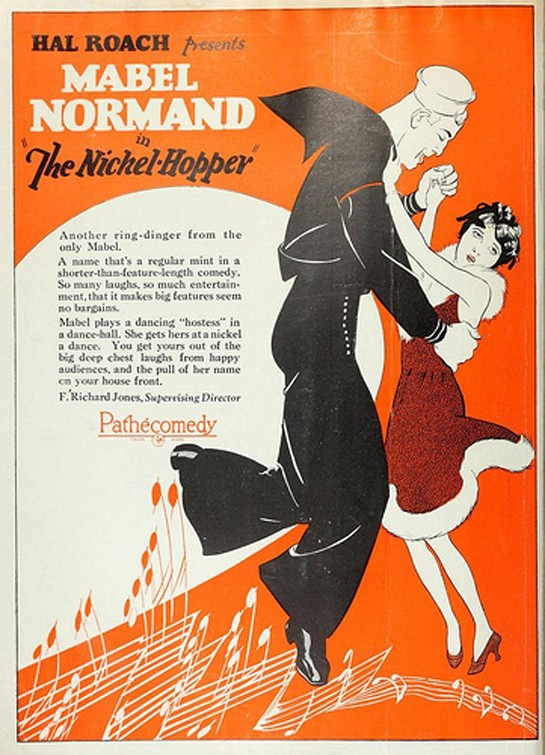
- Film poster
- Directed by: F. Richard Jones; Hal Yates
- Written by: Frank Butler; Stan Laurel; Hal Roach; H. M. Walker (titles)
- Produced by: Hal Roach
- Starring: Mabel Normand; Oliver Hardy; Boris Karloff
- Cinematography: Floyd Jackman; Len Powers; William Wessling
- Edited by: Richard C. Currier
- Distributed by: Pathé Exchange
- Release date: December 5, 1926 (United States)
- Running time: 37 minutes
- Country: United States
- Language: Silent (English intertitles)

The Nickel-Hopper is a 1926 American short silent comedy film starring Mabel Normand and featuring Oliver Hardy and Boris Karloff in minor uncredited roles. The film title refers to a taxi dancer's share of the dime ticket price for each dance at dance halls.

== Cast ==
- Mabel Normand as Paddy, the nickel hopper
- Michael Visaroff as Paddy's father
- Theodore von Eltz as Jimmy Jessop, Paddy's rich beau
- Jimmy Anderson as Cop
- Margaret Seddon as Paddy's mother
- Mildred Kornman as Edsel
- Hammond Holt as Paddy's little brother (uncredited)
- William Courtright as Mr. Joy, the landlord (uncredited)
- James Finlayson as Rupert, resident of 625 Park St. (uncredited)
- Oliver Hardy as Jazz band drummer (uncredited)
- Boris Karloff as Dance Hall Masher (uncredited)
- Gus Leonard as Blind man (uncredited)
- Sam Lufkin as Dance hall extra (uncredited)

== See also ==
- List of American films of 1926
- Filmography of Oliver Hardy
- Boris Karloff filmography
