= Mabel's New Job =

- Directed by: Mabel Normand; George Nichols
- Produced by: Mack Sennett
- Starring: Mabel Normand; Chester Conklin; Charley Chase
- Distributed by: Mutual Film
- Release date: 16 July 1914
- Country: United States
- Language: English

Mabel's New Job is a 1914 film starring Mabel Normand and co-directed by Normand and George Nichols.

The film is presumed lost.

== Cast ==
- Mabel Normand
- Chester Conklin
- Charley Chase
- Dave Anderson
- Cecile Arnold
- Dixie Chene
- Alice Davenport
- Dave Morris
- Al St. John
