= Penelope Lagos =

American actress, model and author

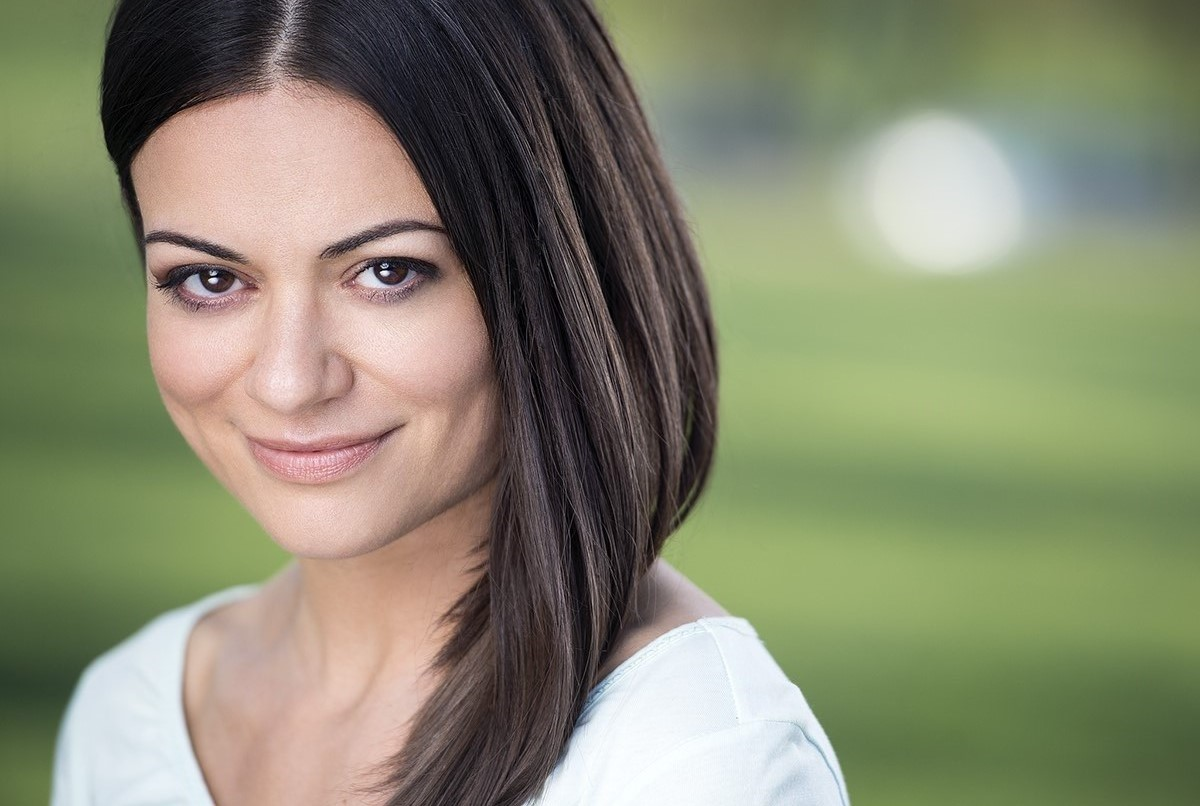
- Occupation(s): Actress/Model, Author
- Years active: 2007–present

Penelope Lagos is an American actress, model and author. She is best known for playing the role of Mabel Normand in the short film Madcap Mabel.

In October 2017, Lagos's first book I Miss My Best Friend was released.

== Personal life ==
A graduate of Rutgers University in New Brunswick, New Jersey with a BA in Communication and Information Studies and Theater Arts, she currently resides in New Jersey.

== Career ==
Lagos is an actress, model and author who began her career in the short film Hit N'Run in 2007. She appeared in the web series WildFlower in which she played the role of Det. Nadia Williams. In 2010, she appeared in the short film Madcap Mabel.

In 2011, Lagos starred in the films Meanwhile and Stuck in the Middle. Her role in the feature film Stuck won her Best Actress in a feature film at the Downbeach Film Festival. Lagos starred in the feature-length comedy The Jersey Devil which premiered at The Landmark Lowes Theater in Jersey City. She also had a supporting role in Ned Rifle, an official selection at The Toronto Film Festival in 2014.

In October 2017, Lagos released her debut children's book, I Miss My Best Friend.

== Filmography ==
Year	Title	Role	Notes
2007	Hit N' Run	Tracey	
2007	Muse	Thalia	
2008	Mary's Laughter	Meredith	
2009	Perception	Hostess #2	
2009	Wildflower Webseries	Det. Nadia Williams	
2010	Madcap Mabel	Mabel Normand	
2011	Meanwhile	Tuesday	
2011	Stuck in the Middle	Brooke Lynne Monroe	
2014	The Jersey Devil	Tori LaSalle	
2014	Ned Rifle	Elenore	
