= One Hour Married =

1927 film

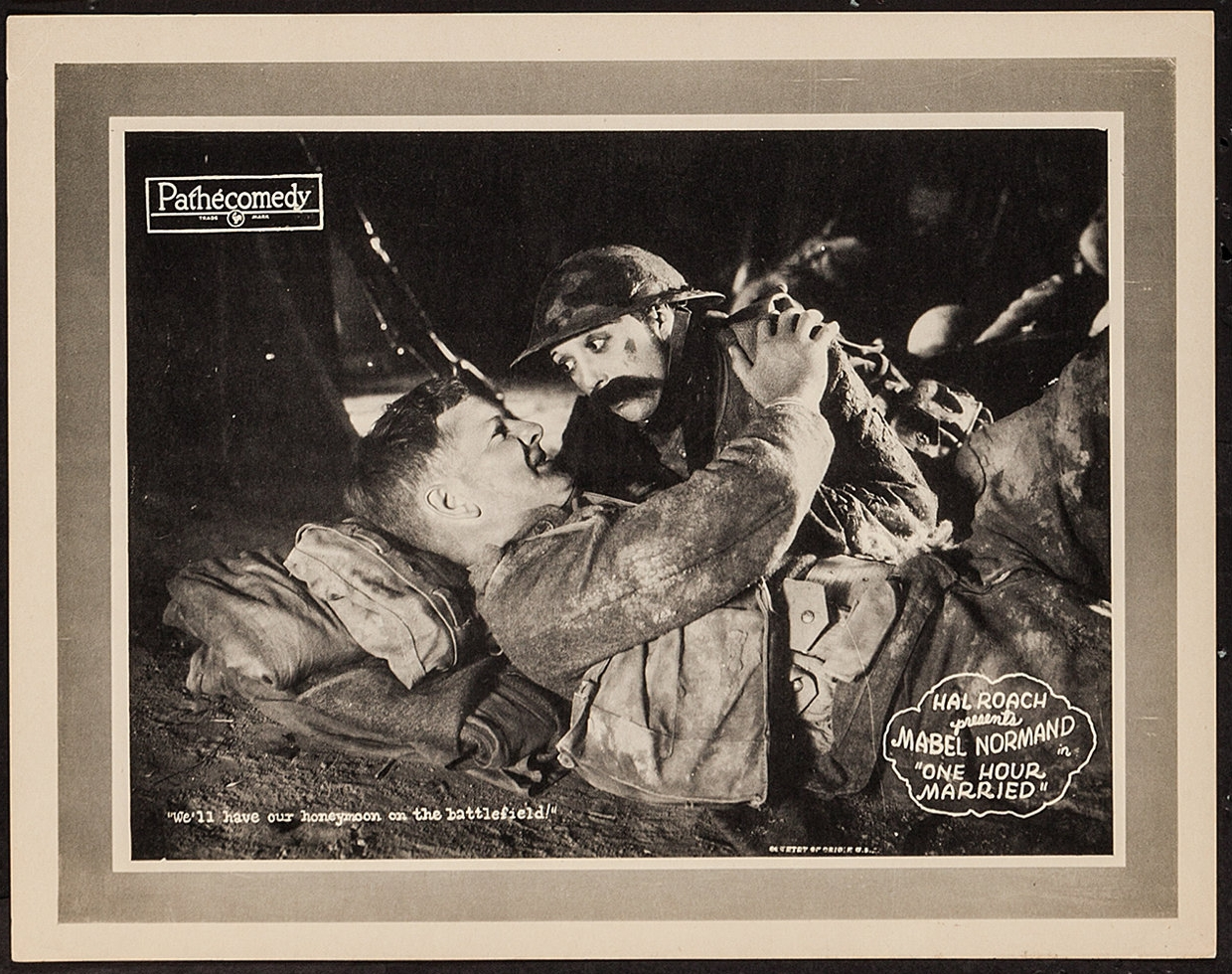
- Lobby Card
- Directed by: Jerome Strong
- Produced by: Hal Roach
- Starring: Mabel Normand
- Distributed by: Pathé Exchange
- Release date: February 27, 1927 (United States)
- Running time: 20 minutes
- Country: United States
- Language: Silent (English intertitles)

One Hour Married is a 1927 American silent short comedy film starring Mabel Normand and directed by Jerome Strong. The film is notable for being Mabel Normand's last appearance onscreen prior to her death in 1930.

== Plot ==
The story is set during the First World War and involves a newly married wife's attempts to locate her husband (drafted into the army just an hour after they were married) in France.

== Cast ==
- Mabel Normand
- Creighton Hale
- James Finlayson
- Noah Young
- Syd Crossley
- Charles Geldert
