= Hot Stuff (1912 film) =

1912 American comedy film directed by Mack Sennett

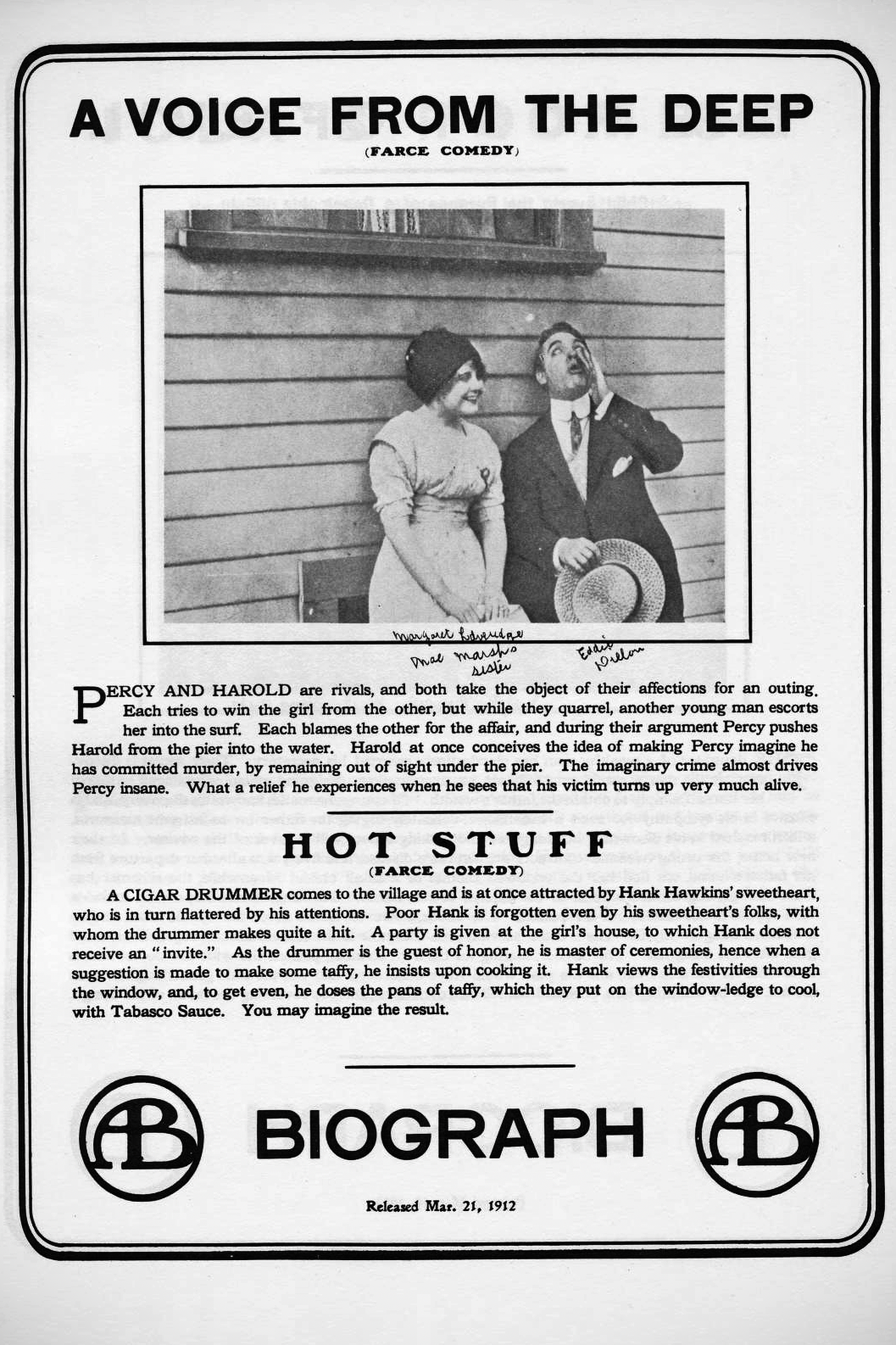
- Directed by: Mack Sennett; Asst Dir William Beaudine
- Story by: Dell Henderson
- Starring: Mack Sennett; Mabel Normand
- Cinematography: Percy Higginson
- Production company: Biograph Company
- Distributed by: General Film Company
- Release date: March 21, 1912
- Running time: 8 minutes; 488 feet (150 m) on 1 reel
- Country: United States
- Languages: Silent; (English intertitles)

Hot Stuff (1912 film)

Hot Stuff is a 1912 American farce comedy silent film directed by Mack Sennett with the screenplay written by Dell Henderson. The film features Mack Sennett as Hank Hawkins (The jilted boyfriend) and Mabel Normand playing Hank's Sweetheart. The film was produced by Biograph Company, distributed by the General Film Company. In the United States, the film premiered on March 21, 1912.

The plot follows a cigar drummer who charms Hank Hawkins' girlfriend and her family, sidelining Hank. A party is staged, where the salesman leads a taffy-pull. As revenge, Hank secretly adds tabasco sauce to the candy while it's cooling outside. When the taffy is served, the merriment takes a turn for the worse.

This film marked the first appearance of a 15-year-old stage actress named Ella Hall in a Biograph film. She played one of the party girls. Her part was uncredited.

== Plot ==
A traveling cigar vendor arrives in town and quickly becomes infatuated with Hank Hawkins' girlfriend, who finds his sophisticated charm appealing. Meanwhile, Hank is completely ignored, even by the girl's own family. The family quickly accepts the salesman and eagerly buys what he is selling.

The group decides to throw a party at Hank's girlfriend's home. All of the locals are invited, but Hank is noticeably excluded. Hank tries to crash the party, but is shown the door. He then wandered around the property and peered in through the back window to observe the events unfolding inside.

The salesman takes center stage as both the guest of honor and master of ceremonies. When someone proposed a Taffy pull, he insisted on taking charge of the cooking process. After the salesman and Hank's girlfriend mix the ingredients, they pour the cooked taffy into flat pans. Next, they placed the hot pans on an old wooden box outside the kitchen's back window. This is the same window where Hank has been watching the party.

Determined to get revenge, Hank heads to the local market for a bottle of Tabasco sauce before returning to the house. He pours it over both pans of taffy and then conceals himself behind some nearby bushes.

As guests believed that the taffy had cooled sufficiently, it was time for the taffy pull. (Note: A taffy pull is a social event around the pulling of taffy that was popular in the 1840s through at least the 1870s. The host would prepare the taffy recipe by melting molasses, sorghum, or sugar with water. Participants would coat their hands with butter and, working with a partner, pull the hot mixture apart, fold it back together, and repeat. This process would add air to the candy, resulting in a soft chewable texture.) The drummer retrieves both pans; the group pairs up and starts pulling taffy. Once they are finished, it is time to eat their candy. However, upon taking a bite, they all gag at its awful flavor and immediately blame the salesman. The group starts chasing the drummer, who dashes out of the house and narrowly catches a streetcar.

Hank is conveniently standing nearby as the salesman makes a hurried exit. The group notices him, and his girlfriend's father warmly welcomes him back into the family. They all return to the house together. Once inside, each person offers heartfelt apologies, but Hank is struck by a wave of honesty. He admits buying Tabasco sauce and pouring it over the taffy, confessing that his intention was to win back his beloved. After some reflection, the family forgives him and encourages him to mend his relationship with his girlfriend. Hank and his sweetheart reunite, share a kiss, and bravely face the future together.

== Cast ==
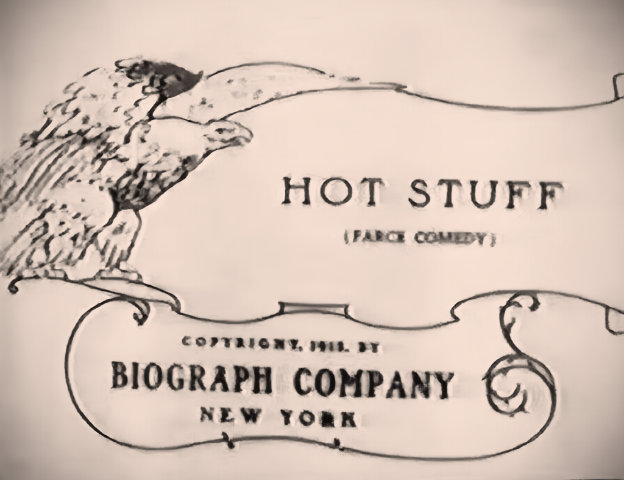
Actor	Role
Mack Sennett	Hank Hawkins	Opening title to movie
Mabel Normand	Hank's Sweetheart	Opening title to movie
Dell Henderson	Cigar Drummer	Opening title to movie
William Beaudine	Cigar Store Owner	Opening title to movie
William J. Butler	Hank's Sweetheart's Father	Opening title to movie
Kate Bruce	Hank's Sweetheart's Mother	Opening title to movie
Fred Mace	Hank's Sweetheart's Uncle	Opening title to movie
Edward Dillon	Party Guest	Opening title to movie
Ella Hall	Party Guest (unconfirmed)	Opening title to movie
Grace Henderson	Party Guest	Opening title to movie
Harry Hyde	Party Guest	Opening title to movie
Kate Toncray	Party Guest	Opening title to movie

== Production ==
The Biograph Company, also known as the American Mutoscope and Biograph Company, was a leading studio during the silent era. (Note: The Biograph Company was founded in 1895 and was active until 1916. It was the first company in the United States devoted entirely to film production and exhibition, and for two decades was one of the most prolific, releasing over 3000 short films and 12 feature films.)

=== Pre production ===
==== Director ====
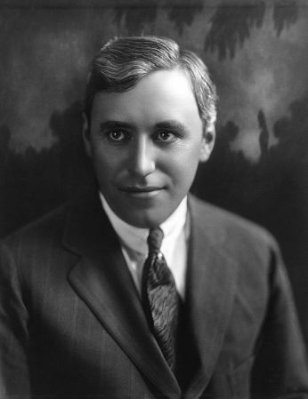
Mack Sennett
Director

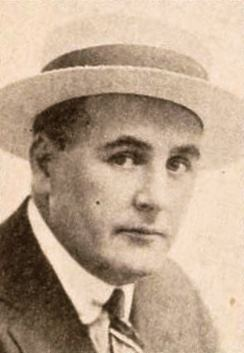
Dell Henderson
Writer

Mack Sennett a.k.a. Michael Sinnott (January 17, 1880 – November 5, 1960) was a Canadian Actor, director, Producer and Studio Head born in Danville, Quebec, Canada. Sennett was 32 years-old when he directed and acted as Hank Hawkins. In 1912, Sennett was involved as an actor and director in 83 films. This was the sixth movie he was involved with this year. He would remain involved in the film industry for 54 years, from 1902 to 1956.

==== Screenplay ====
Dell Henderson a.k.a. George Adelbert Henderson, Del Henderson, Arthur Buchanan (July 5, 1877 – December 2, 1956) was a Canadian Actor, director and screenWriter born in St. Thomas, Ontario, Canada. Henderson was 34 years old when he created the screenplay for this movie and acted as the cigar drummer. Dell Henderson started his acting career on the stage, but appeared in his first movie in 1908. Henderson frequently worked with D. W. Griffith and, to a lesser extent, Mack Sennett. Besides acting, Henderson directed nearly 200 silent films between 1911 and 1928. He was active in the industry from 1908 to 1950.

=== Filming ===
"We made pictures as fast as we could for money," Mack said. "We used to go into a park with a stepladder, a bucket of whitewash and Mabel Normand and make a picture," Chaplin said. For making comedy on the spot, Mabel was ideal.

— quoted from book by Betty Fussell

==== Location ====
This motion picture venue is listed simply as "California." While the exact filming location within the state is unknown, all available sources consistently identify California as the site. Beginning in 1910, Biograph sought to establish a presence in California. Biograph aimed to position itself as a major force in Los Angeles filmmaking and played a significant role in the early establishment of Hollywood.

=== Post production ===
==== Running time ====
All published accounts state this film's footage is exactly 488 feet (150 m). A full reel of 1,000 feet is estimated to be 10 to 17 minutes long. Note, the film's duration on the Internet Archive and YouTube is 8 minutes.

==== Copyright ====
Copyright filed with Library of Congress Copyright Office.

BIOGRAPH, March, HOT STUFF.
© 1 c. Mar 21, 1912; J167393

==== Technical aspects ====
Type	Value
Aspect ratio	1.33 : 1
Frame rate	16–18 frames per second (fps)
Film Color	Black and white
Gauge	35mm spherical
Length	488 feet (150 m)
Reel	one
Runtime	8 minutes Short film
Sound mix	Silent
Stock	Cellulose nitrate

In 1912, the technical specifications for professional films were standardizing around the hand-cranked speed of approximately 16 frames per second (fps). Films were almost universally shot in black and white, were silent, and had a typical 4:3 aspect ratio

== Release and reception ==
=== Official release ===
In the United States, the one-reel short film was released as a split-reel on Thursday, March 21, 1912. Biograph films were always released on Mondays or Thursdays in 1912. The other film of the split-reel release was the 7-minute comedy — A Voice from the Deep. Both films were directed by Mack Sennett and written by Dell Henderson.

The film was released in the United Kingdom on Thursday, May 9, 1912.

The DVD "Rare Films of Mack Sennett, Volume 1" was released in 2012 by Classic Video Streams, which contains a copy of this film.

=== Advertising ===
During this early period in the history of filmmaking, full-page advertisements for short films in trade journals were uncommon. A full-page ad appears in Biograph's own trade journal, but the page reads more like a statement than an ad, hoping to draw audiences to the theater. Significant publicity for films would emerge when feature movies become more the norm.

=== Reviews ===
==== Critical response ====
Movie reviews were critical opinions for theater owners and fans. Critiques of movies printed in different trade journals and newspapers were vital in determining whether to book or watch the movie.

- In the April 6, 1912 issue of the Moving Picture World, the reviewer critiqued the motion picture as follows:
  "A farce comedy, fairly entertaining throughout and affording one or two good laughs near its end. "Hot Stuff" is tabasco sauce and a jilted lover who wasn't invited to the candy pull put it in the candy, cooling on the dry goods box under the window. His hated rival had made the fudge."

== Preservation status ==
The film is extant and survives as a 16mm reduction positive (Note: A 16mm reduction positive denotes a distinct type of motion picture film print. This format is used to distribute films originally shot in 35mm, focusing on non-theatrical settings such as educational institutions, libraries, and home viewers. The process entails making direct prints onto 16mm film stock. Generally, these prints use safety film rather than nitrate film.) in the UCLA Film & Television Archive, the Library of Congress, the MoMA in New York, and Lobster Films. (Note: Lobster Films is a renowned Paris-based film restoration company founded by Serge Bromberg, specializing in preserving and distributing rare cinema, particularly from the silent era (1900s–1940s).)

== Gallery ==
The Players

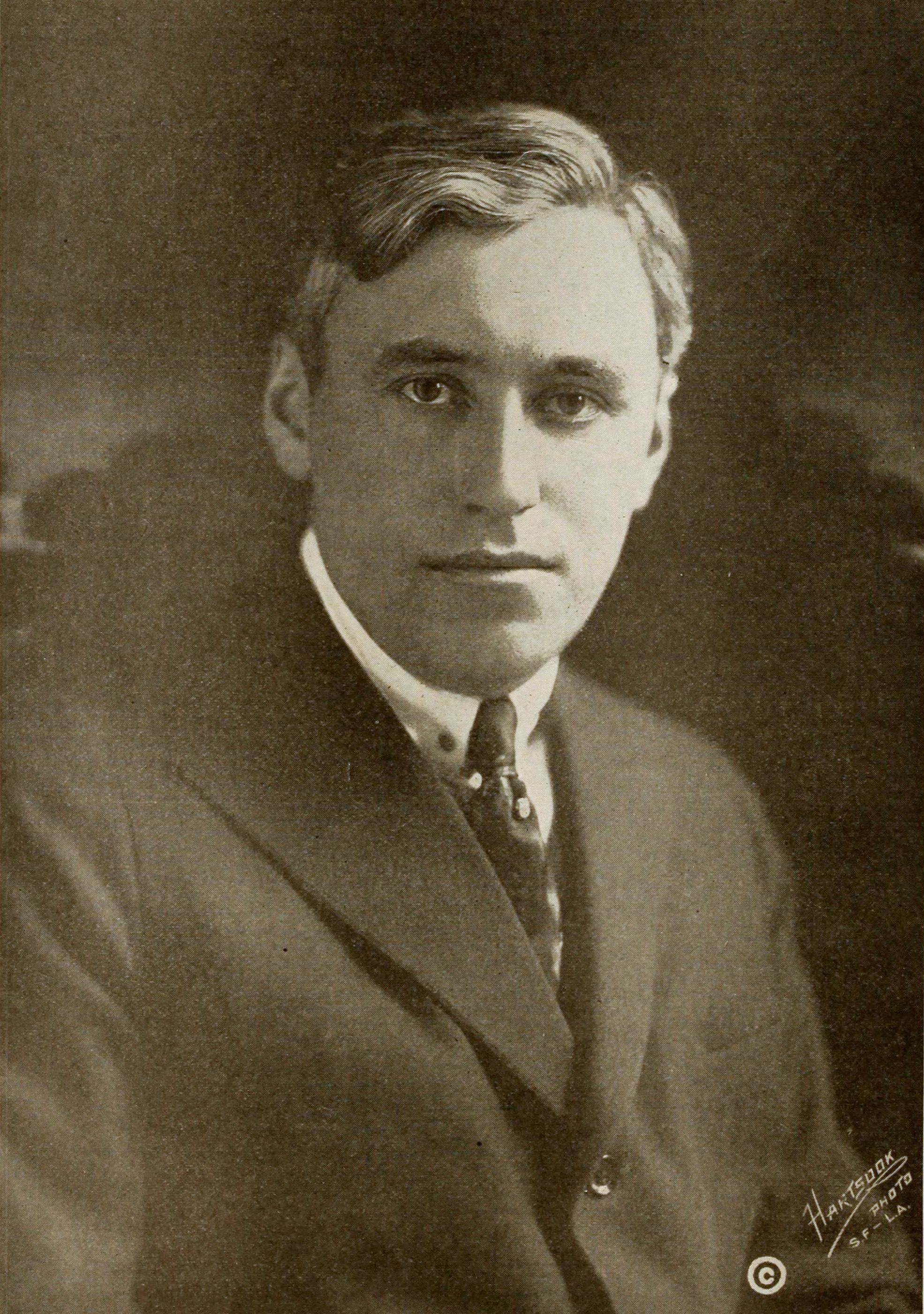
Mack Sennett
Hank Hawkins

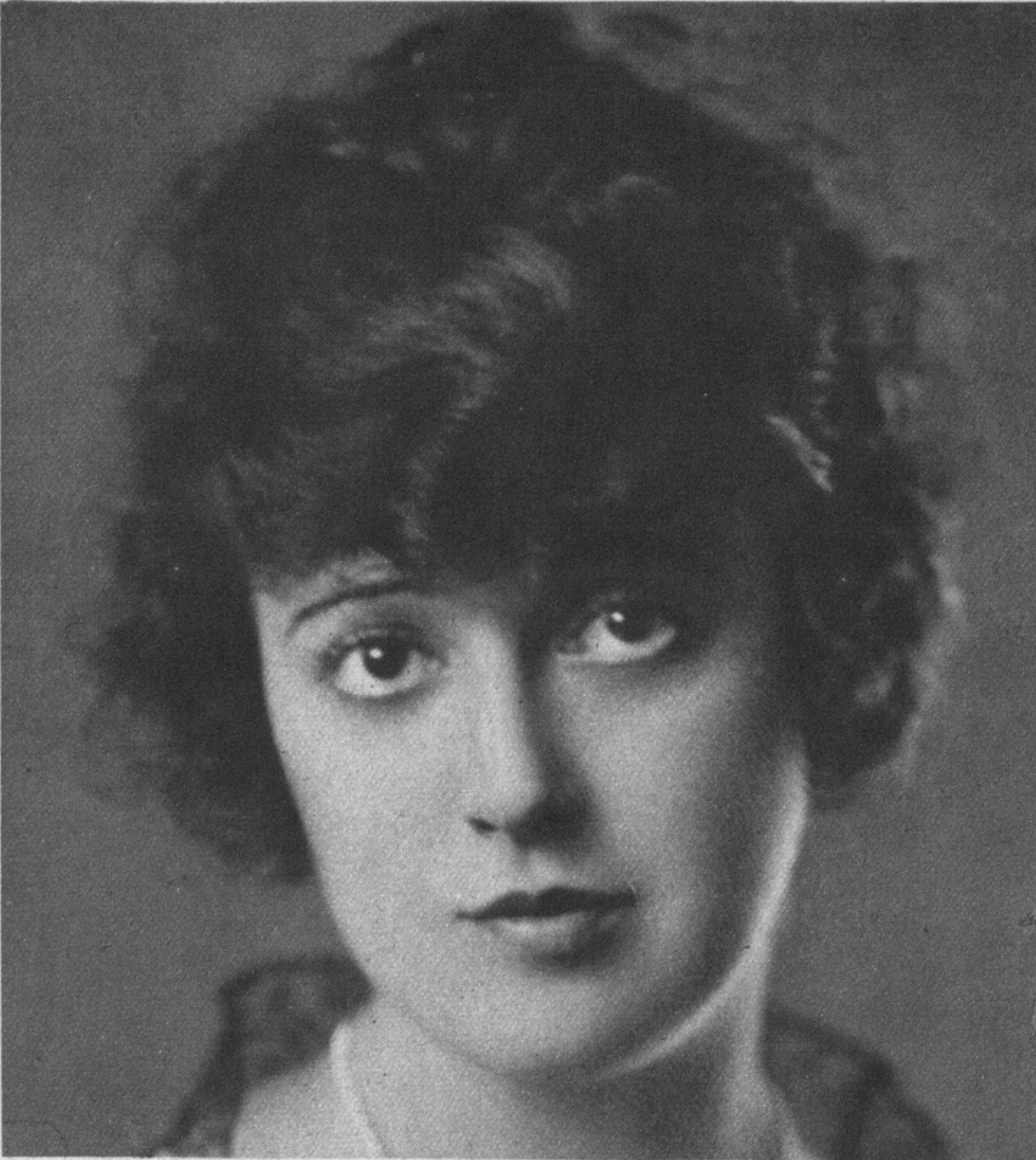
Mabel Normand
Hank's Sweetheart

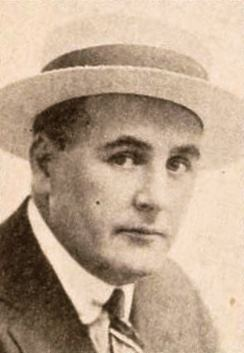
Dell Henderson
Cigar Drummer

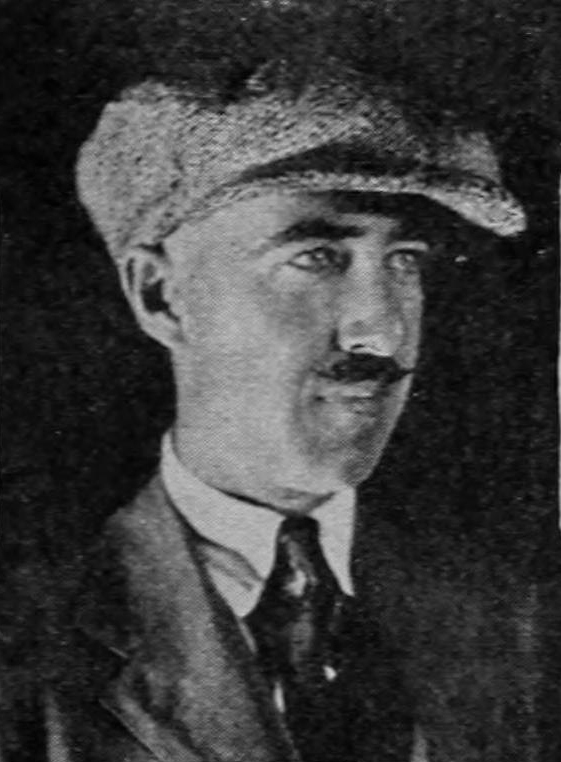
William Beaudine
Store Owner

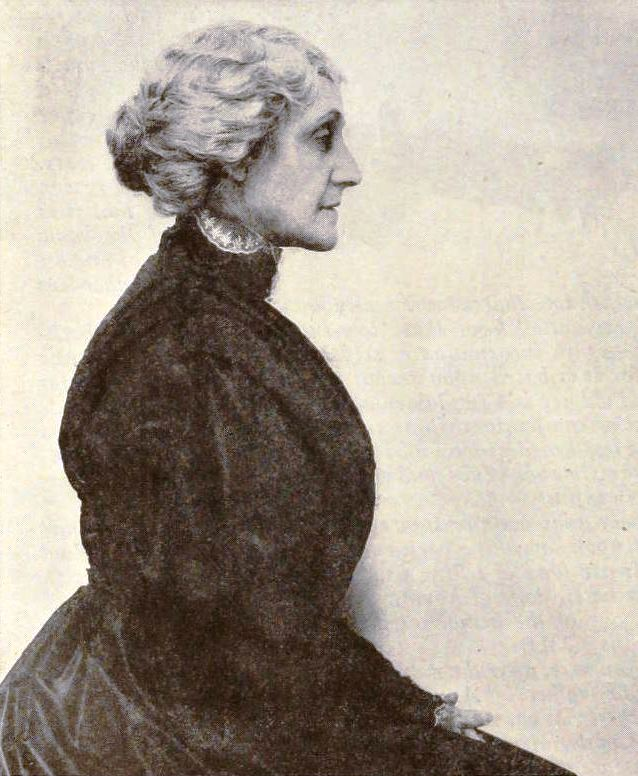
Kate Bruce
Sweetheart's Mother

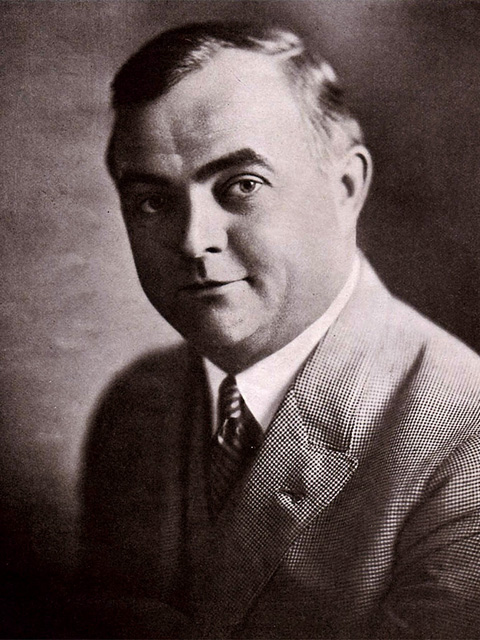
Fred Mace
Sweetheart's Uncle

== Bibliography ==
- Fussell, Betty Harper (1992). Mabel. Bloomsbury Academic. ISBN 978-0-87910-158-9.
- Kawin, Bruce (January 17, 1992). How Movies Work. University of California Press. ISBN 978-0-520-07696-9. Archived from the original on October 26, 2025.
- Lauritzen, Einar; Lundquist, Gunnar (1976). American Film-Index 1908–1915: Motion Pictures, July 1908 – December 1915. distributed by Akademiebokhandeln, University of Stockholm. Stockholm: Film-Index. ISBN 91-7410-001-7.
- Savade, Elias (1995). The American Film Institute Catalog of Motion Pictures Produced in the United States: Film Beginnings, 1893–1910 — A Work in Progress: v. A. Scarecrow Press. ISBN 0-8108-3021-3.
