= A Little Hero (film) =

1913 film

- Directed by: George Nichols
- Produced by: Mack Sennett
- Starring: Mabel Normand
- Distributed by: Mutual Film
- Release date: May 8, 1913
- Running time: 4 minutes
- Country: United States
- Language: Silent with English intertitles

PLAY copy of A Little Hero distributed in the Netherlands with Dutch intertitles and under the title De Schrandere Hond ("The Clever Dog"); running time 00:04:31

A Little Hero is a 1913 American silent short comedy film featuring Mabel Normand.

== Cast ==
- Mabel Normand
