= Her Awakening =

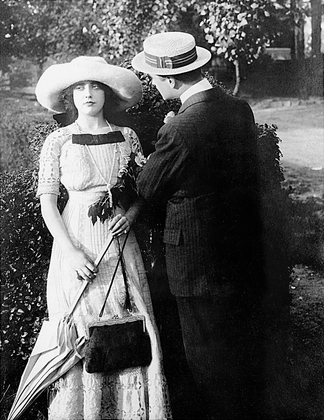
- Mabel Normand and Harry Hyde
- Directed by: D. W. Griffith
- Produced by: Biograph Company
- Starring: Mabel Normand; Harry Hyde; Kate Bruce
- Cinematography: G. W. Bitzer
- Distributed by: General Film Company
- Release date: September 28, 1911 (United States)
- Running time: 18 minutes
- Country: United States
- Language: Silent (English intertitles)

Her Awakening is a 1911 American short silent drama film starring Mabel Normand and directed by D. W. Griffith. Normand portrays a vivaciously effervescent young woman ashamed to introduce her poorly dressed mother to her elegant suitor. This early drama helped launch Normand's career and is believed to have been her second film and first substantial role. The supporting cast features Harry Hyde, Kate Bruce, Donald Crisp and Robert Harron.

The film was produced by the Biograph Company when it and many other early film studios in America's first motion picture industry were based in Fort Lee, New Jersey at the beginning of the 20th century and was exhibited at the Museum of Modern Art in New York City in 2006 as part of a one-night program about the city's brief reign as movie capital of the United States.

== Cast ==
- Mabel Normand as The Daughter
- Harry Hyde as The Sweetheart
- Kate Bruce as The Mother
- Edwin August
- William J. Butler as A Doctor
- Donald Crisp as Accident Witness
- Frank Evans as Accident Witness
- Robert Harron as On Street/Accident Witness
- J. Jiquel Lanoe as A Doctor/Accident Witness
- Fred Mace as A Laundry Customer
- Charles Hill Mailes as Accident Witness
- Vivian Prescott as A Laundry Employee
- W.C. Robinson as Accident Witness
- Marion Sunshine
- Kate Toncray as Old Woman/Accident Witness
