= Gerald Mast =

American historian (1940–1988)

- Born: May 13, 1940; Los Angeles, California, U.S.
- Died: September 1, 1988 (aged 48); Chicago, Illinois, U.S.
- Occupation: Film historian

Gerald Mast (May 13, 1940 – September 1, 1988) was an American author, film historian, and member of the University of Chicago faculty. He was a contributor to the modern discipline of film studies and film history.

== Life and career ==
Mast was born in Los Angeles in 1940; his family included his mother, Bessie, and Linda, his sister. He attended the University of Chicago, where he received his bachelor's, master's, and doctoral degrees in English. He taught at New York University, Oberlin College, and the Richmond College of the City University of New York, before joining the faculty of his alma mater in 1978. He chaired the Department of English Language and Literature, and his donation of 300 film prints established the university's Film Studies Center and Film Archive. The university press published several of his books on the history and critical analysis of film.

His works were influential in the development of the academic study of film history, including the application of the Chicago School of literary criticism to film analysis, and several of his books, including A Short History of the Movies and Film Theory and Criticism, have been widely incorporated into university film studies programs.

== Criticism ==
Mast faced some criticism for his opposition to Hollywood auteurism by some of his peers.

== Death and legacy ==
On September 1, 1988, Mast, age 48, died at Bernard Mitchell Hospital from complications of AIDS. At a time when public figures in the arts often remained unwilling to be associated with the disease, Mast requested that his obituaries include his cause of death. In a retrospective in Cinema Journal, Tag Gallagher compared him to French film critic Jean Mitry, and described him as America's "film-scholar laureate".

Mast's partner, actor Peter Burnell, best known for his role as Dr. Mike Powers on the NBC daytime soap opera The Doctors, preceded him in death. Burnell was diagnosed with AIDS, and died by suicide by hanging on Jan. 5th, 1987 in Chicago, Illinois at the age of 44.

== Selected works ==
- A Short History of the Movies (1971)
- The Comic Mind: Comedy and the Movies (1973)
- Film Theory and Criticism: Introductory Readings (1974)
- Film/Cinema/Movie: A Theory of Experience (1977)
- The Movies in Our Midst: Documents in the Cultural History of Film in America (1982)
- Howard Hawks, Storyteller (1982)
- Can't Help Singin': The American Musical on Stage and Screen (1987)
- Bringing Up Baby: Howard Hawks Director ed. (1989)
