= Keystone Studios =

American film studio (Los Angeles; 1912–1935)

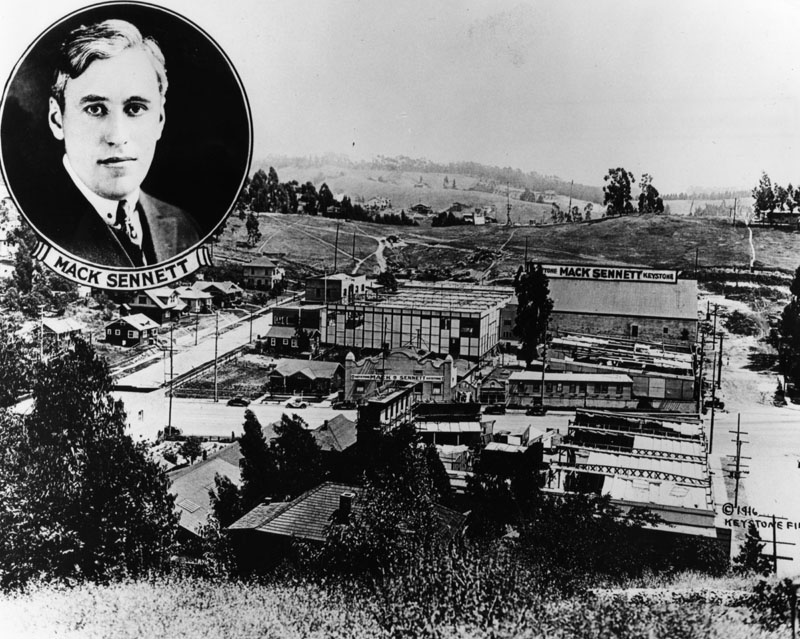
- Keystone Studios, 1915
- Industry: Film studio
- Founded: 1912 (as Keystone Pictures Studio)
- Founder: Mack Sennett
- Defunct: 1935
- Headquarters: Edendale, Los Angeles

Keystone Studios was an early film studio founded in Edendale, California (which is now a part of Echo Park) on July 4, 1912 as the Keystone Pictures Studio by Mack Sennett with backing from actor-writer Adam Kessel (1866–1946) and Charles O. Baumann (1874–1931), owners of the New York Motion Picture Company (founded 1909). The company, referred to at its office as The Keystone Film Company, filmed in and around Glendale and Silver Lake, Los Angeles for several years, and its films were distributed by the Mutual Film Corporation between 1912 and 1915. The Keystone film brand declined rapidly after Sennett went independent in 1917.

The name Keystone was taken from the side of one of the cars of a passing Pennsylvania Railroad train (Keystone State being the nickname of the Commonwealth of Pennsylvania) during the initial meeting of Sennett, Kessel and Baumann in New York.

The original main building, the first totally enclosed film stage and studio in history, is still standing. It is located at 1712 Glendale Blvd in Echo Park, Los Angeles and is now being used as a Public storage facility.

== Production ==
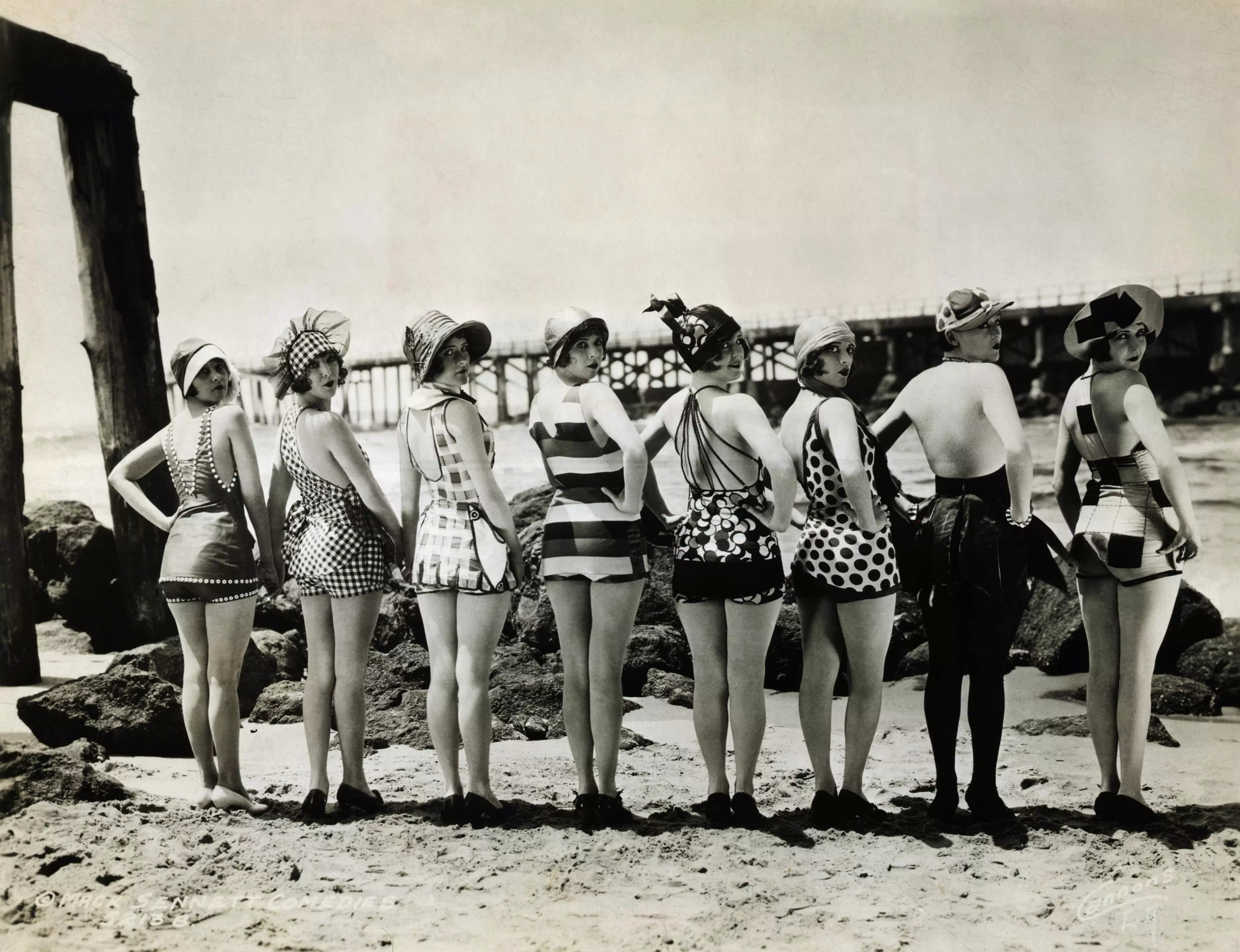
The "Sennett Bathing Beauties"

The studio is especially remembered for its silent film era under Mack Sennett, the Canadian-American film actor, director, and producer, who became known as the 'King of Comedy'. With financial backing from Adam Kessel and Charles O. Bauman of the New York Motion Picture Company, Sennett founded Keystone Studios in Edendale, California – now a part of Echo Park – in 1912. The original main building which was the first totally enclosed film stage and studio ever constructed, is still there today. Known as Sennett's Fun Factory, it was here that he created the slapstick antics of the Keystone Cops (from 1912) and the Sennett Bathing Beauties (beginning in 1915). Keystone comedies were noted for their hair-raising car chases and custard pie warfare, especially in the Keystone Cops series. Charlie Chaplin got his start in films at Keystone when Sennett hired him in 1914, fresh from his vaudeville career, to make silent films, in which he rapidly became a star performer and film director, participating in thirty-five films within the single year he worked there. Other actors who worked at Keystone toward the beginning of their film careers include Marie Dressler, Harold Lloyd, Mabel Normand, Roscoe Arbuckle, Gloria Swanson, Louise Fazenda, Raymond Griffith, Ford Sterling, Ben Turpin, Harry Langdon, Al St. John and Chester Conklin.

In 1915, Keystone Studios became an autonomous production unit of the Triangle Film Corporation with D. W. Griffith and Thomas Ince. Sennett left in 1917 to produce his own independent films (eventually distributed through Paramount), after which Keystone's business declined. Keystone Studios eventually closed after bankruptcy in 1935.

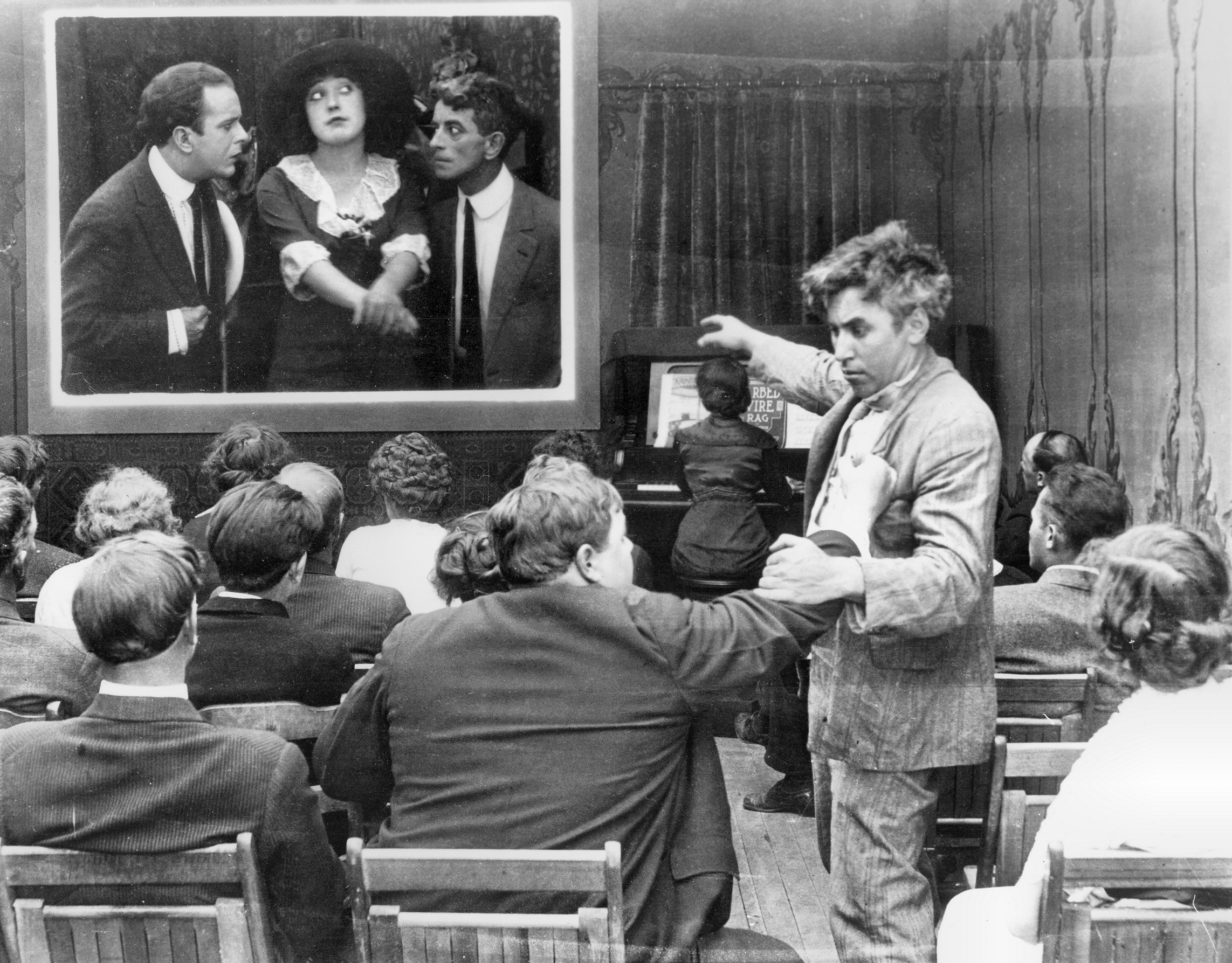
Scene in Mabel's Dramatic Career (1913) with two moviegoers ("Fatty" Arbuckle and Sennett) arguing while watching Mabel Normand on screen

PLAY copy of Keystone's short A Little Hero released in 1913 in Netherlands with Dutch intertitles; running time: 00:04:31.

== Legacy ==
Much of the lighting and studio equipment from Keystone was bought by Reymond King, who started the "Award Cinema Movie Equipment" company in Venice, CA in November, 1935.

"Keystone Studios" is the fictional studio in the Cineville film Swimming With Sharks (1994).

In 2007, when the independent film studio Cineville merged with the DVD distributor Westlake Entertainment, the companies named their joint enterprise Keystone.

The original Keystone Studios lot was an explorable location, as well as a major plot element, in the 2011 video game L.A. Noire, published by Rockstar Games.

== Gallery ==
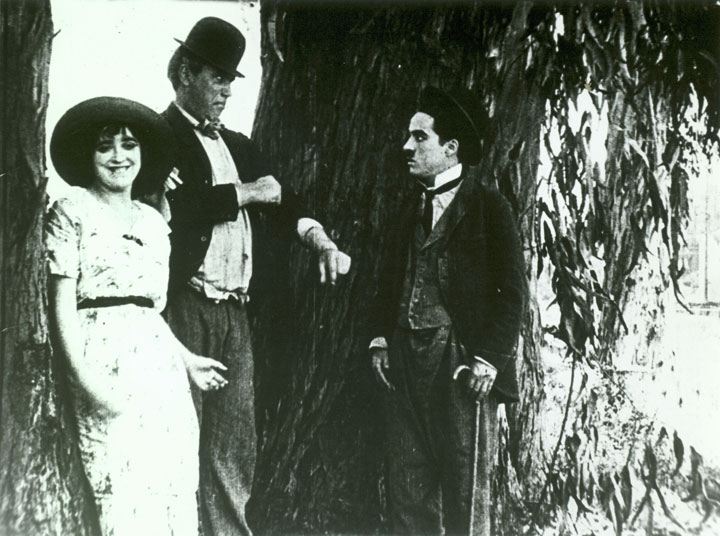
Mabel Normand, Mack Sennett and Charles Chaplin in The Fatal Mallet (1914)

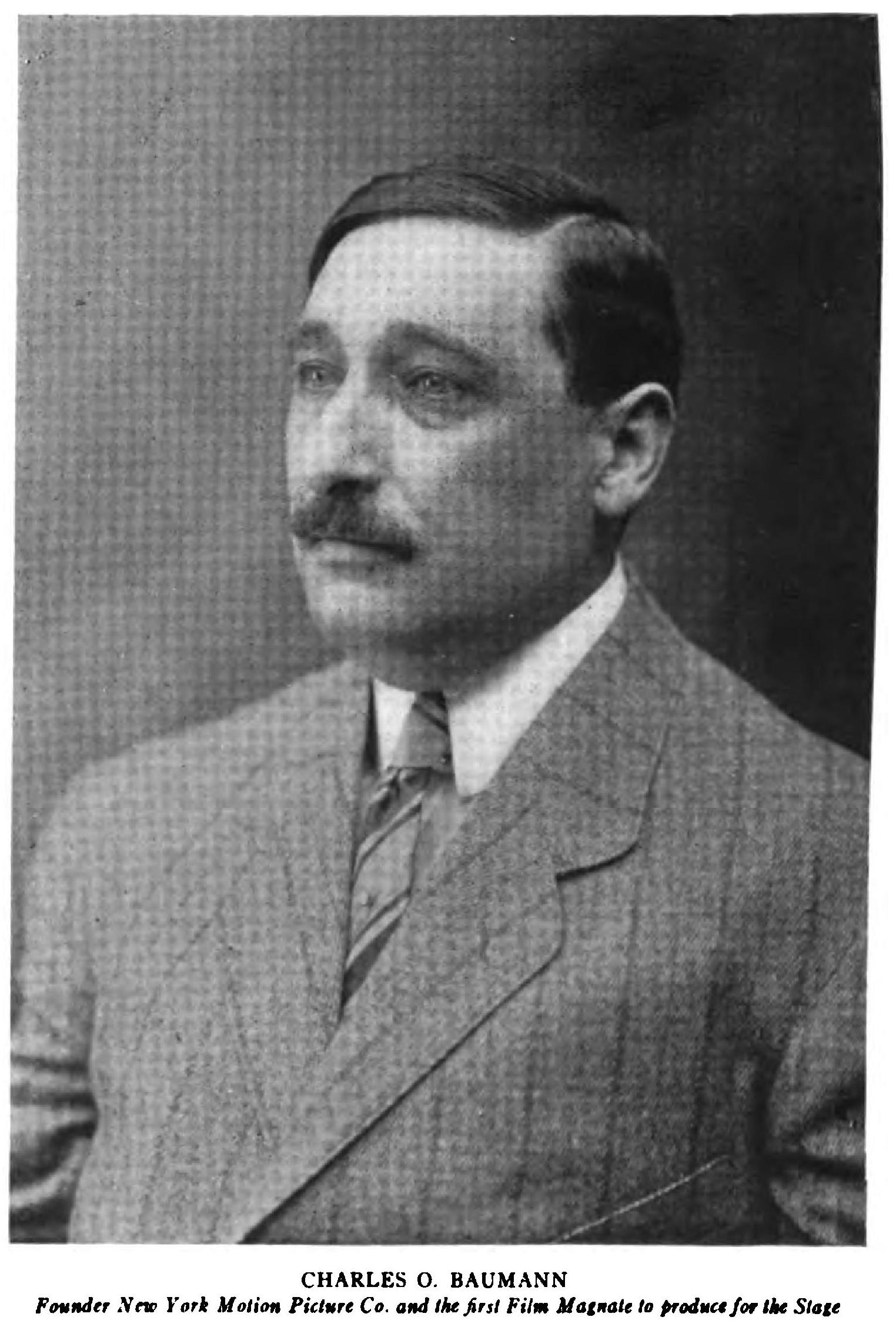
Charles Baumann

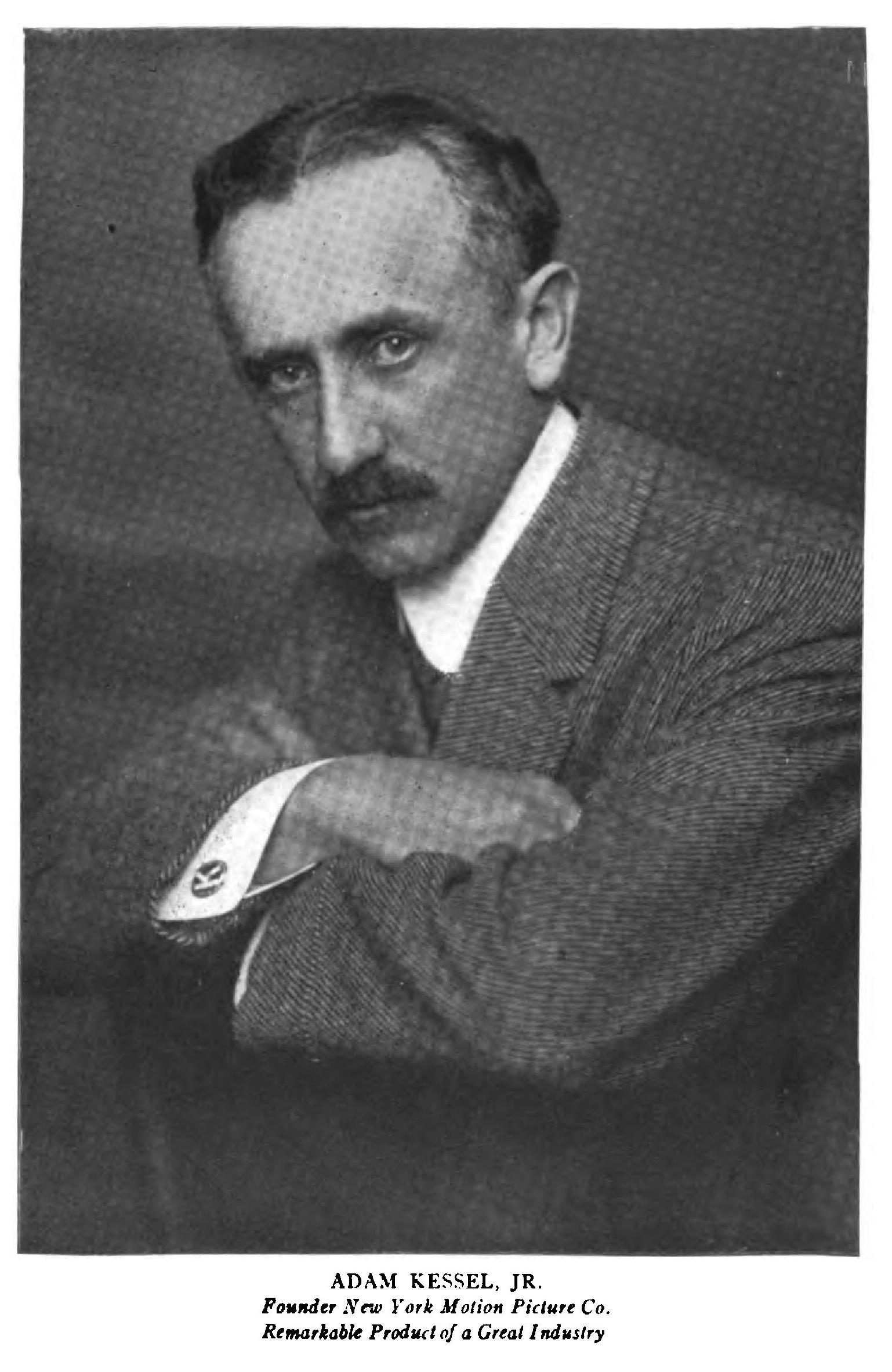
Adam Kessel

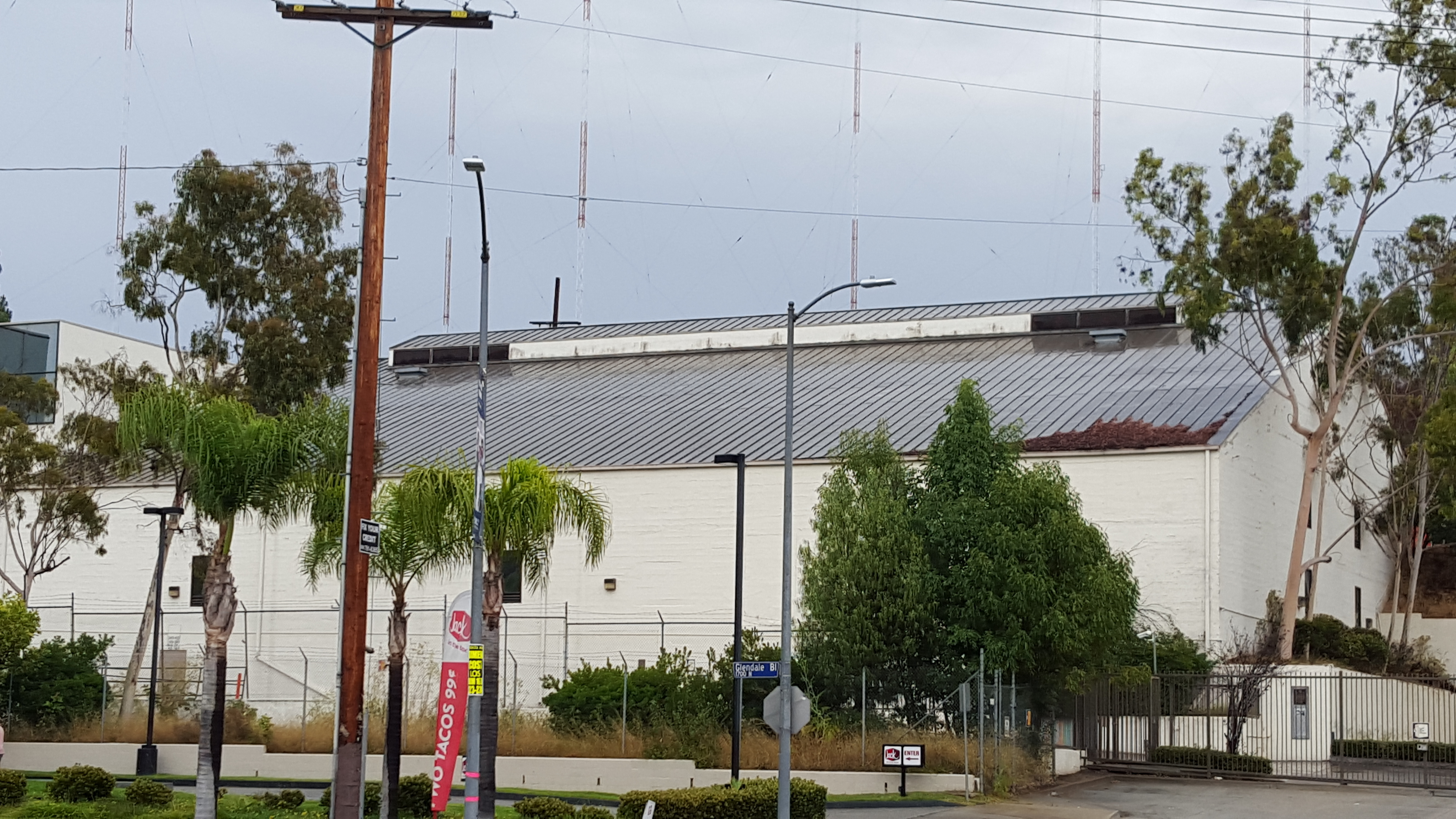
Keystone Studios building, Echo Park - Present Day
