= The Scrub Lady =

The Scrub Lady (aka Tillie The Scrub Lady)
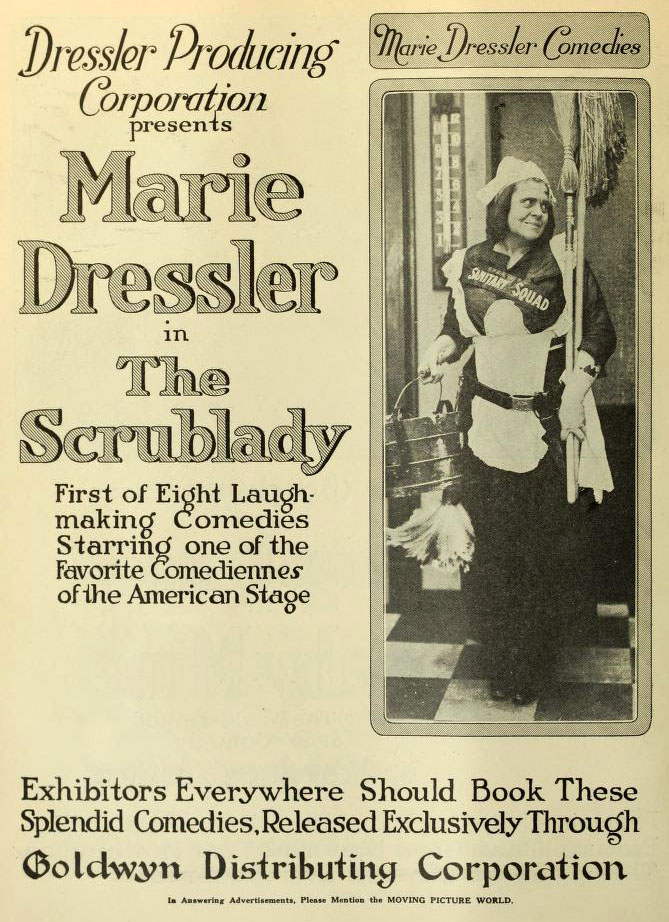
- advertisement
- Written by: Vincent P. Bryan
- Produced by: Marie Dressler
- Starring: Marie Dressler
- Distributed by: Goldwyn Pictures
- Release date: December 1917
- Running time: 2 reels; 600 feet
- Country: United States
- Language: Silent (English intertitles)

The Scrub Lady, also known as Tillie the Scrub Lady, is a 1917 American silent comedy short film produced by and starring Marie Dressler and distributed by Goldwyn Pictures. The picture is preserved in the Library of Congress.

Vincent P. Bryan was a composer, lyricist and writer. He had helmed nearly all of Charles Chaplin's Mutual films. The newly created Goldwyn Pictures brought Bryan in to write The Scrub Lady.

Dressler portrayed Tillie in three other films, including the first full-length comedy, Tillie's Punctured Romance (1914), with Charles Chaplin and Mabel Normand, as well as Tillie's Tomato Surprise (1915) and Tillie Wakes Up (1917). Tillie has a different last name in Tillie Wakes Up, which could be explained by the fact that her character is married.

== Cast ==
- Marie Dressler as Tillie
- Max Davidson (in still photo with Dressler)
