= Eve Greene =

American screenwriter

- Born: May 21, 1906; Chicago, Illinois, U.S.
- Died: July 15, 1997 (aged 91); Laguna Hills, California, U.S.
- Resting place: Hollywood Forever Cemetery
- Occupation: Screenwriter

Eve Greene (May 21, 1906 – July 15, 1997) was an American screenwriter active primarily during the 1930s through the 1950s.

== Biography ==
=== Early life ===
Greene grew up in Champaign, Illinois, and dreamed of being a Hollywood writer.

=== Career ===
She attended the University of Illinois and then moved to Los Angeles, where she got a job as a secretary at MGM and was mentored by Charles Brabin. She'd later be promoted to script clerk. She credited Zelda Sears for helping her learn the ropes in the industry. At MGM, under Sears's tutelage, she wrote a few Marie Dressler vehicles before moving on to Paramount and then to freelance at various Hollywood studios.

=== Personal life ===
Eve's sister, Babette Greene, was executive secretary of the Screen Writers Guild.

== Partial filmography ==
- Born to Kill (1947)
- The Queen of Spies (1942)
- Sweater Girl (1942)
- The Night of January 16th (1941)
- Little Accident (1939)
- Stolen Heaven (1938)
- Artists & Models (1937) (adaptation)
- When Love Is Young (1937)
- Her Husband Lies (1937)
- Yours for the Asking (1936)
- The Great Impersonation (1935)
- Storm Over the Andes (1935)
- Operator 13 (1934)
- This Side of Heaven (1934) (adaptation)
- You Can't Buy Everything (1934)
- Day of Reckoning (1933)
- Beauty for Sale (1933)
- Tugboat Annie (1933)
- Prosperity (1932)
