= The Strange Love of Molly Louvain =

1932 film

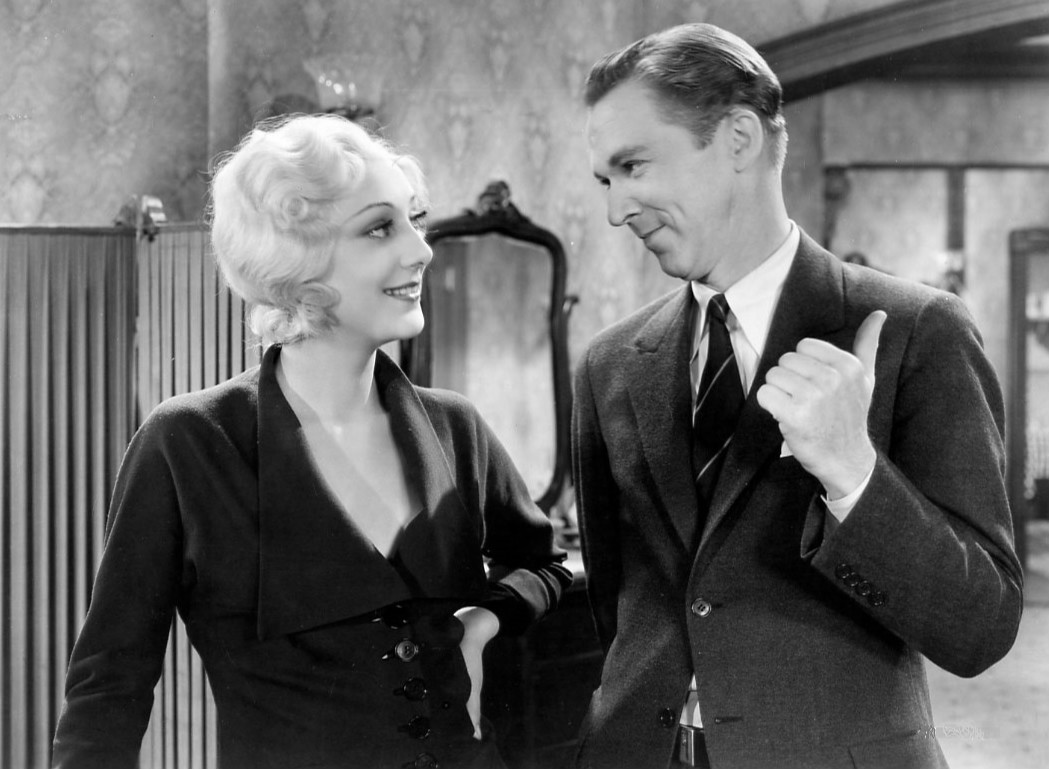
- Ann Dvorak and Lee Tracy
- Directed by: Michael Curtiz
- Written by: Erwin S. Gelsey; Brown Holmes
- Based on: Tinsel Girl; 1931 play by Maurine Dallas Watkins
- Produced by: Hal B. Wallis
- Starring: Ann Dvorak; Lee Tracy
- Cinematography: Robert Kurrle
- Edited by: James B. Morley
- Music by: Bernhard Kaun
- Production company: First National Pictures
- Distributed by: Warner Bros. Pictures
- Release date: May 28, 1932 (United States)
- Running time: 73 mins.
- Country: United States
- Language: English

The Strange Love of Molly Louvain is a 1932 American pre-Code crime drama film directed by Michael Curtiz and starring Ann Dvorak and Lee Tracy. The script was based on the play Tinsel Girl by Maurine Dallas Watkins, and was screened by the UCLA Film & Television Archive

== Plot ==
Molly Louvain is a young woman who has a baby out of wedlock. She falls in with a career criminal and, after he is shot by police, she hides out with a former bellhop who wants to marry her and make her "respectable." But, instead, she falls in love with Scotty Cornell, a fast-talking cynical newspaper reporter, who does not realize that she is, in fact, the very gun moll that he has been writing about in his columns. As she is about to go to prison, he discovers her identity, but pledges to stick by her nevertheless.

== Cast ==
- Ann Dvorak as Madeleine Maude 'Molly' Louvain
- Lee Tracy as Scott 'Scotty' Cornell
- Richard Cromwell as Jimmy Cook
- Guy Kibbee as Pop, a Policeman
- Leslie Fenton as Nicky Grant
- Frank McHugh as Skeets, a Reporter
- Evalyn Knapp as Doris
- Charles B. Middleton as Police Captain Slade
- Mary Doran as Dance Hall Girl
- Thomas E. Jackson as Police Sergeant
- C. Henry Gordon as Detective Martin
- George Chandler as Reporter
- Louise Beavers as Washroom Attendant (uncredited)
- Wade Boteler as Detective (uncredited)
- Selmer Jackson as Detective Charlie (uncredited)
- Hank Mann as Harley, a Reporter (uncredited)
- Snub Pollard as B. J. Pratt, Bill Collector (uncredited)
- Jacquie Lyn as Ann Marie (uncredited)
