= The Agonies of Agnes =

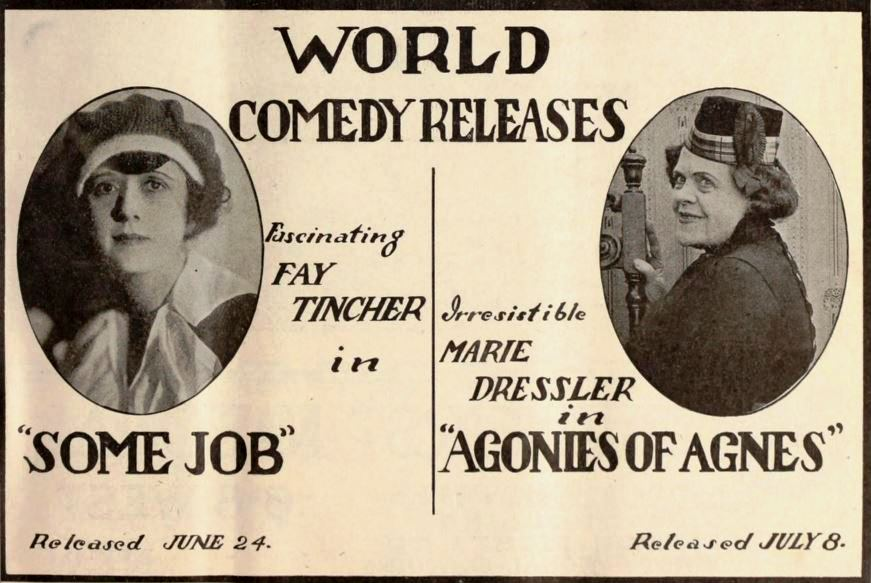
- Directed by: Marie Dressler
- Release date: 1918
- Running time: 20 minutes
- Country: United States
- Language: Silent..English intertitles

The Agonies of Agnes is a 1918 silent film adventure comedy, directed by Marie Dressler and starring Marie Dressler.

== Plot ==
Although the plot involves stunts and a villain who kidnaps the title character, much like the serial The Perils of Pauline, the film was usually described as a comedy. "You laugh-lovers will fairly double up with laughter when you see Marie Dressler in The Agonies of Agnes," promised one newspaper review. "it's a scream, a riot, a screech of fun, a howl of delight."

== Cast ==
- Marie Dressler
