= Zelda Sears =

Actress, novelist, screenwriter and businesswoman

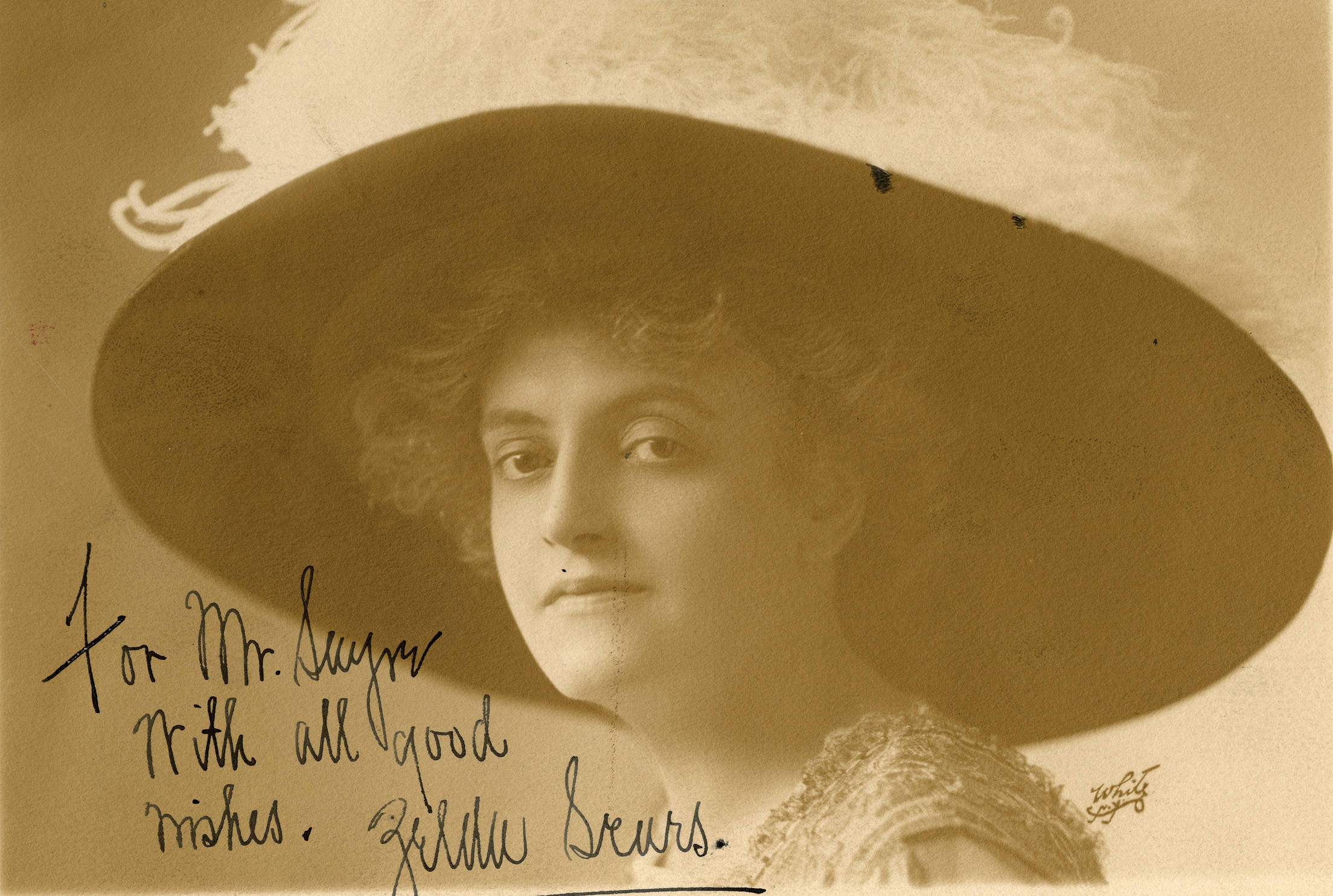
- Born: Zelda Paldi; January 21, 1873; Brockway Township, Michigan, U.S.
- Died: February 19, 1935 (aged 62); Hollywood, California, U.S.
- Occupations: Actress, writer
- Years active: 1924-1934
- Spouse(s): Herbert E. Sears (1892–1895); Louis C. Wiswell (1918–1935)

Signature
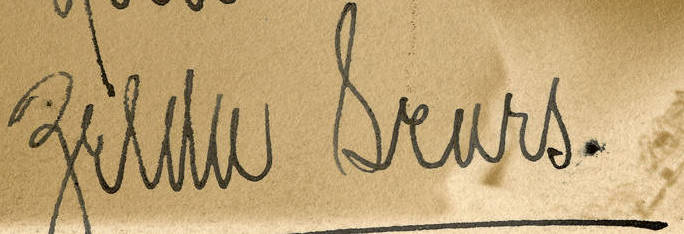

Zelda Sears (née Paldi; January 21, 1873 – February 19, 1935) was an American actress, screenwriter, novelist and businesswoman.

== Early life and background ==
She was born as Zelda Paldi near Brockway Township, St. Clair County, Michigan, into a multi-lingual family that spoke French, Italian and English. Her father, Justin Lewis Paldi, was a first-generation Italian immigrant engineer and horse breeder, and her mother Roxa Tyler was of English heritage.

Her entry into the job market at age 12 was borne out of a family financial crisis. Merchant L.A. Sherman conducted an essay contest for his store's opening day, with Sears submitting the winning entry and being rewarded with a position as cash runner for the sales staff. In the evening hours, she educated herself on secretarial skills. She was eventually promoted to the position of sales clerk. When she expressed an interest in writing, Sherman transferred her as a reporter on his newspaper the Port Huron Daily Times.

In June 1889, at age 16, she made her acting debut as alternating roles in a Port Huron production of Esther at the City Opera House. Setting her sights on a newspaper career, she journeyed to Detroit, Michigan, with no luck finding a job, and then ventured to Chicago, Illinois. While rooming at the Chicago YWCA, and waiting for her big break in the newspaper business, she worked for Longnecker and Company painting flowers on boxes. She earned extra money by selling her original greeting card verses.

== Acting and writing careers ==
In 1892, she married actor Herbert E. Sears, and would continue to use his name professionally after the dissolution of their marriage three years later. She got her foot in the door of the Chicago Herald newspaper by contributing to its humor column. When her father died, Sears began reading the numerous play scripts in his extensive personal library, adding to her already considerable interest in the profession. Actress Sarah Bernhardt performed in at Chicago's Daly Theater in 1894, and Sears initially set out to secure an interview with the star for the Herald. She ended up being hired as an extra in the production, changing the course of her professional life. Later continuing with a local acting stock company, and honing her craft with Hart Conway's American Conservatory of Acting, she eventually relocated to New York. Producer A.L. Erlanger offered her a small role as one of the ballerinas, a skill she had to learn on the job, in the 1896 production of Jack and the Beanstalk at the Casino Theatre. She spent the next few years expanding her skills with traveling stock companies.

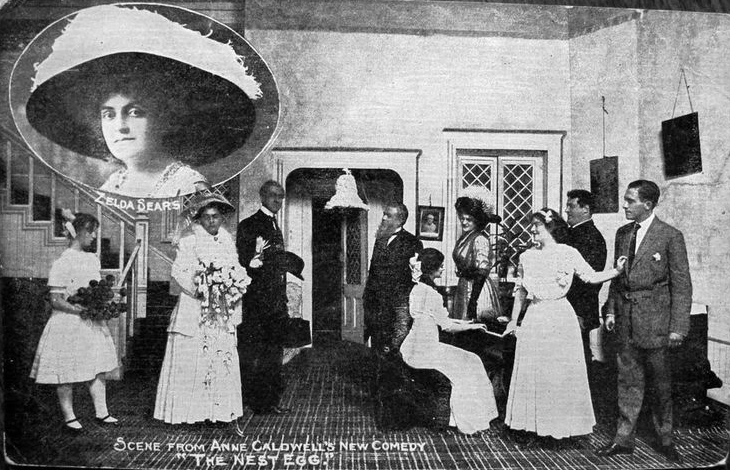
Scene from Anne Caldwell's The Nest Egg with Zelda Sears at the Park Theatre, Boston, Massachusetts, ca.1911

As she continued to pursue acting roles, Sears operated her own public stenography/typewriting service in New York, near the Empire Theatre on Broadway. Her clients were theatre people, playwrights. She soon developed into a proficient script doctor, with an eye towards becoming a playwright herself. It was during her 1900 performance as the jealous murderess La Colombe in Wine and Women at the Boston Theatre, that she met her future collaborator, playwright Clyde Fitch. He offered her a part in his new play Lover's Lane. While continuing her professional relationship with Fitch, including as his script doctor, she took a full-time job with theatrical producer Henry Wilson Savage. The company's vice president Louis C. Wiswell would eventually become her second husband. Under Fitch's influence, performing in seven plays written by him, she began to develop the stage persona she would become most identified with, a spinster wise in years but eternally yearning for marriage. Journalist Ada Patterson would later proclaim Sears "The Greatest of Stage Old Maids".

She began writing for films at the request of Cecil B. DeMille and MGM in the early 1920s, and continued to do so for more than a decade.

== Death ==
On August 6, 1918, Sears married her long-time friend Louis C. Wiswell. She died at age 62 in her Hollywood home in 1935, from undisclosed causes. She was survived by Wiswell, and a sister, Marie Paldi.

== Stage ==
Partial listing:

Broadway credits of Zelda Sears
Year	Title	Theatre	Notes	Ref(s)
1889	Esther	City Opera House (Port Huron)	As Azila	
1889	La Dame aux Camélias	Daily Theater (Chicago)	Extra	
1896	Jack and the Beanstalk	Casino Theatre	As a ballerina	
1900	Woman and Wine	The Boston Theatre	As La Colombe. Written by Arthur Shirley and Benjamin Landeck	
1901	Lover's Lane	Manhattan Theatre	Written and staged by Clyde Fitch	
1903	Glad of It	Savoy Theatre	Written and staged by Clyde Fitch	
1904	The Coronet of the Duchess	Garrick Theatre	Written and staged by Clyde Fitch	
1905	Cousin Billy	Criterion Theatre	Written and directed by Clyde Fitch	
1907	The Truth	Criterion Theatre, Lyceum Theatre	Written and staged by Clyde Fitch. Sears played Mrs. Crespigny, reprised her performance in a 1914 production, and assumed the role again when the drama was adapted as a 1920 film of the same title.	
1908	Nearly a Hero	Casino Theatre	Mrs. Doolittle	
1908	Girls	Daly's Theatre	As Lucille Purcelle; written and staged by Clyde Fitch	
1909	The Blue Mouse	Lyric Theatre; Maxine Elliott's Theatre	Replacement performer; written and staged by Clyde Fitch	
1909	Girls	Hackett Theatre	Revival, reprised her role as Lucille Purcelle	
1910	The Girl He Couldn't Leave Behind	Garrick Theatre		
1910	Keeping Up Appearances	Collier's Comedy Theatre		
1910	The Nest Egg	Bijou Theatre	Lead role as Hetty Gandy	
1914	The Truth	Little Theatre	Reprise performance as Mrs. Crespigny	
1915	The Show Shop	Hudson Theatre		
1916	Fast and Grow Fat	Globe Theatre		
1917	Captain Kidd, Jr.	Cohan and Harris Theatre		
1917	Mary's Ankle	Bijou Theatre		
1919	Tumble In	Selwyn Theatre	Aunt Selina	
1920	The Girl in the Limousine	Empire Theatre	Aunt Cicely	
1921	Lady Billy	Liberty Theatre	Musical based on a book by Sears; lyrics by Sears	
1923	The Clinging Vine	Knickerbocker Theatre	Musical, lyrics by Sears	
1923	The Magic Ring	Liberty Theatre	Musical based on a book by Sears; lyrics by Sears	
1924	Lollipop	Knickerbocker Theatre	Mrs. Gerrity, musical based on a book by Sears; lyrics by Sears	
1925	A Lucky Break	Cort Theatre	Playwright	
1926	Rainbow Rose	Forrest Theatre	Based on a story by Sears	

== Filmography ==
Zelda Sears film credits
Year	Title	Role	Writer	Notes	Ref(s)
1920	The Truth	Mrs. Crespigny		Silent film	
1921	The Highest Bidder	Mrs. Steese		Silent film	
1924	Cornered			Silent film based on the 1920 play Cornered by Dodson Mitchell and Zelda Sears	
1926	The Clinging Vine			Silent film based on the play The Clinging Vine by Zelda Sears	
1926	Corporal Kate		X	Silent film co-written with Marion Orth	
1926	The Cruise of the Jasper B		X	Silent film adaptation by Sears and Tay Garnett of the 1916 novel The Cruise of the Jasper B by Don Marquis	
1927	The Night Bride		X	Silent film adaptation	
1927	No Control		X	Silent film	
1927	Rubber Tires		X	Silent film adaptation by Sears and Tay Garnett	
1927	The Rush Hour		X	Silent film adaptation by Sears of March 1923 short story "The Azure Shore" by Frederic Hatton and Fanny Hatton in Harper's Bazaar	
1927	The Wise Wife		X	Silent film adaptation by Sears and Tay Garnett of the 1928 Arthur Somers Roche novel of the same name	
1929	Devil-May-Care		X	Dialogue	
1930	The Divorcee	Hannah	X	Film treatment	
1930	The Bishop Murder Case	Mrs. Otto [Miss] Drukker			
1930	Road to Paradise			Sound remake of the 1924 silent film Cornered, both of which are based on the1920 play Cornered by Dodson Mitchell and Zelda Sears	
1931	Susan Lenox (Her Fall and Rise)		X	Dialogue	
1931	Politics		X	Story, with Malcolm Stuart Boylan	
1931	Daybreak		X	Continuity	
1931	Reducing		X	Continuity	
1931	Inspiration	Pauline			
1932	New Morals for Old		X	Dialogue	
1932	Emma		X	Dialogue	
1932	Prosperity		X	Screenplay, with Eve Greene	
1933	Broadway to Hollywood		X	Sears and Harlan Thompson were brought in as Script doctors	
1933	Tugboat Annie		X	With Eve Green, adaptation of "Tugboat Annie " short stories by Norman Reilly Raine in The Saturday Evening Post	
1933	Beauty for Sale		X	With Eve Greene, screenplay	
1933	Day of Reckoning		X	With Eve Greene, screenplay	
1934	The Cat and the Fiddle		X	Sears and Eve Greene were brought in as script doctors	
1936	His Brother's Wife			Sears and Eve Greene originally slated as writers, but are not credited in the final product	
1934	Operator 13		X	With Eve Greene and Harvey Thew, screenplay	
1934	Sadie McKee	Mrs. Craney			
1934	This Side of Heaven		X	With Eve Greene, adaptation of the 1932 novel It Happened One Day by Marjorie Bartholomew Paradis	
1934	A Wicked Woman	Gram Teague	X	With Florence Ryerson, screenplay	
1934	You Can't Buy Everything		X	With Eve Greene, adaptation	

== Sourcing ==
- Briscoe, Johnson (1908). The actors' birthday book: First -third series. An authoritative insight into the lives of the men and women of the stage born between January first and December thirty-first. Moffat, Yard and Company. p. 34. "Zelda Sears -wikipedia."
- Marra, Kim (1995). "Marginal Experience/Mainstream Vision in the Theatrical Career of Zelda [Paldi] Sears". In Maufort, Marc (ed.). Staging Difference: Cultural Pluralism in American Theatre and Drama, 1995. New York: Peter Lang. pp. 75–84. ISBN 978-0-8204-2732-4. Archived from the original on 2018-07-16.
