= This Side of Heaven =

1934 film by William K. Howard

- Directed by: William K. Howard
- Screenplay by: Zelda Sears; Eve Greene; Edgar Allan Woolf; Florence Ryerson
- Based on: This Side of Heaven; 1932 novel by Marjorie Bartholomew Paradis
- Produced by: John W. Considine Jr.
- Starring: Lionel Barrymore; Fay Bainter; Mae Clarke; Tom Brown; Una Merkel
- Cinematography: Harold Rosson
- Edited by: Frank E. Hull
- Music by: William Axt
- Production company: Metro-Goldwyn-Mayer
- Distributed by: Loew's Inc.
- Release date: February 2, 1934
- Running time: 77 minutes
- Country: United States
- Language: English

This Side of Heaven is a 1934 American pre-Code drama film directed by William K. Howard, written by Zelda Sears, Eve Greene, Edgar Allan Woolf and Florence Ryerson, and starring Lionel Barrymore, Fay Bainter, Mae Clarke, Tom Brown and Una Merkel. It was released on February 2, 1934, by Metro-Goldwyn-Mayer.

== Premise ==
Personal and professional problems eventually drive a man to attempt suicide.

== Cast ==
- Lionel Barrymore as Martin Turner
- Fay Bainter as Francene Turner
- Mae Clarke as Jane Turner
- Tom Brown as Seth Turner
- Una Merkel as Birdie
- Mary Carlisle as Peggy Turner
- Onslow Stevens as Walter
- Henry Wadsworth as Hal
- Edward Nugent as Vance
- C. Henry Gordon as William Barnes
- Dickie Moore as Freddie
- Edwin Maxwell as R.S. Sawyer
- Mickey Daniels as Stinky Bliss
- Helen Hayes as Actress on screen in theatre, Uncredited Cameo (Clip from Another Language)
- Robert Montgomery as Actor on screen in theatre, Uncredited cameo (Clip from Another Language)
