= Prosperity (film) =

1932 film

- Poster of the film
- Directed by: Sam Wood
- Screenplay by: Zelda Sears; Eve Greene
- Story by: Sylvia Thalberg; Frank Butler
- Produced by: Irving Thalberg (uncredited)
- Starring: Marie Dressler; Polly Moran; Anita Page; Norman Foster
- Cinematography: Leonard Smith
- Edited by: Le Vanway
- Distributed by: Metro-Goldwyn-Mayer
- Release date: November 1, 1932
- Running time: 87 minutes
- Country: United States
- Language: English
- Budget: $628,000
- Box office: $1,514,000

Prosperity is a 1932 American pre-Code comedy-drama film starring Marie Dressler and Polly Moran. The two leading actresses play longtime matriarchs comically sparring off each other, and trying to control their intertwined lives.

== Plot ==
Maggie Warren inherited a family bank during the Depression and Lizzie Praskins is one of her biggest depositors. Maggie’s son John is engaged to Lizzies's daughter Helen. All kinds of farces happen when the would-be mothers-in-law battle for setting the wedding's protocol including their different preferences of choosing the pastor to perform the ceremony.

As the story goes on, Lizzie has a panic attack based on rumors about the bank going belly-up. She hysterically withdraws all her money causing all other customers in the bank to panic and they in return take out their money. The Warren family bank is forced to close. Maggie’s naïve son gets swindled out of his mother’s bonds. As farces go, at the end the swindlers are caught and Maggie’s matriarchal resourcefulness with her wised-up son gets the bank solvent again, and the two matriarchal families are bonded with mirthful resolutions.

== Cast ==
- Marie Dressler as Maggie Warren
- Polly Moran as Lizzie Praskins
- Anita Page as Helen Praskin
- Norman Foster as John Warren
- Jacquie Lyn as Cissy
- Jerry Tucker as Buster
- Charles Giblyn as Mayor
- Frank Darien as Ezra Higgins
- Henry Holland as John Roche

== Box office ==
According to MGM records the film earned $1,166,000 in the US and Canada and $348,000 elsewhere resulting in a profit of $378,000.
