= The Highest Bidder =

1921 film

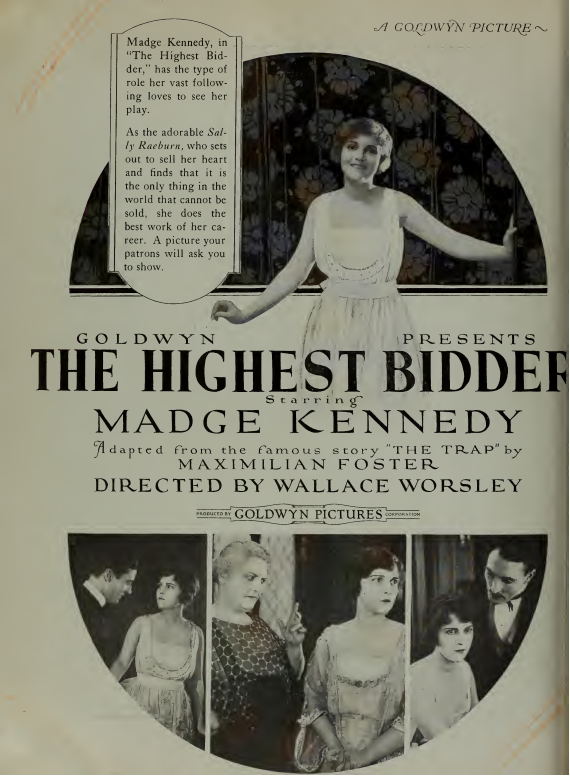
- Directed by: Wallace Worsley
- Screenplay by: Lloyd Lonergan
- Based on: The Trap by Maximilian Foster
- Starring: Madge Kennedy; Lionel Atwill; Vernon Steele; Ellen Cassidy; Zelda Sears; Joseph Brennan
- Cinematography: George Peters
- Production company: Goldwyn Pictures
- Distributed by: Goldwyn Pictures
- Release date: January 15, 1921
- Running time: 60 minutes
- Country: United States
- Language: Silent..English titles

The Highest Bidder is a lost 1921 American drama film directed by Wallace Worsley and written by Lloyd Lonergan. It is based on the 1920 novel The Trap by Maximilian Foster. The film stars Madge Kennedy, Lionel Atwill, Vernon Steele, Ellen Cassidy, Zelda Sears and Joseph Brennan. The film was released on January 15, 1921, by Goldwyn Pictures.

== Cast ==
- Madge Kennedy as Sally Raeburn
- Lionel Atwill as Lester
- Vernon Steele as Hastings
- Ellen Cassidy as Fanny de Witt
- Zelda Sears as Mrs. Steese
- Joseph Brennan as Horace Ashe
- Reginald Mason as Mawsby
- Brian Darley as Butts
- William Black as Mr. Steese
