= Politics (1931 film) =

1931 film

- Theatrical release poster
- Directed by: Charles Reisner
- Screenplay by: Wells Root; Robert E. Hopkins
- Story by: Zelda Sears; Malcolm Stuart Boylan
- Starring: Marie Dressler; Polly Moran; Roscoe Ates
- Cinematography: Clyde De Vinna
- Edited by: William S. Gray
- Production company: Metro-Goldwyn-Mayer
- Distributed by: Metro-Goldwyn-Mayer
- Release date: July 25, 1931
- Running time: 73 minutes
- Country: United States
- Language: English

Politics is a 1931 American pre-Code comedy film directed by Charles Reisner and written by Wells Root and Robert E. Hopkins. The film stars Marie Dressler, Polly Moran, Roscoe Ates, Karen Morley, and William Bakewell. It was released on July 25, 1931 by Metro-Goldwyn-Mayer.

== Plot ==
Crime runs rampant in Lake City and the corrupt mayor is running for another term of office. It appears as though he will win until the disgusted women of the town back homebody Hattie Burns to run against him.

== Cast ==
- Marie Dressler as Hattie Burns
- Polly Moran as Ivy Higgins
- Roscoe Ates as Peter Higgins
- Karen Morley as Myrtle Burns
- William Bakewell as Benny Emerson
- John Miljan as Jim Curango
- Joan Marsh as Daisy Evans
- Tom McGuire as Mayor Tom Collins
- Kane Richmond as Nifty Morgan
- Mary Alden as Mrs. Mary Evans
