= Yours for the Asking =

1936 film by Alexander Hall

- Directed by: Alexander Hall
- Written by: Eve Greene; Philip MacDonald; Harlan Ware
- Based on: story by William R. Lipman and William H. Wright
- Produced by: Lewis E. Gensler; William LeBaron
- Starring: George Raft; Dolores Costello; Ida Lupino
- Cinematography: Theodor Sparkuhl
- Edited by: James Smith
- Music by: Boris Morros
- Production company: Paramount Pictures
- Distributed by: Paramount Pictures
- Release date: August 19, 1936
- Running time: 72 minutes
- Country: United States
- Language: English

Yours for the Asking is a 1936 American comedy film starring George Raft as a casino owner and Dolores Costello as the socialite he hires as hostess. The movie also features Ida Lupino and was directed by Alexander Hall.

== Plot ==
Johnny Lamb runs a secret casino in Miami. He meets impoverished socialite Lucille Sutton and decides to open a casino at her mansion. His friends worry Lucille will ruin Johnny so they hire con artists Gertie Malloy and Dictionary McKinney to impersonate socialites to seduce Johnny. Johnny falls for Gertie and asks for Lucille's help in wooing her.

== Cast ==
- George Raft as Johnny Lamb
- Dolores Costello as Lucille Sutton
- Ida Lupino as Gert Malloy
- Reginald Owen as Dictionary McKinney
- James Gleason as Saratoga
- Edgar Kennedy as Bicarbonate
- Lynne Overman as Honeysuckle
- Robert Gleckler as Slick Doran
- Groucho Marx as Sunbather (uncredited)
- Dennis O'Keefe as Man (uncredited)
- Charles Ruggles as Sunbather (uncredited)
- Ellen Drew as Girl (uncredited)
- Thomas A. Curran as Man (uncredited)

== Production ==
The film was known as The Duchess. Paramount announced it in October 1935 with Raft attached from the beginning. He was to make it after It Had to Happen which he did at Fox. The title was changed to Yours for the Asking in April 1936.

Groucho Marx, Charles Ruggles and Tookie Spreckles appeared as extras when the film shot some footage on Coronado Island at the Hotel del Coronado.

== Reception ==
The film made a small profit.
