= The Cross Red Nurse =

1918 film

The Cross Red Nurse is a one-reel 1918 silent comedy film directed by and starring Marie Dressler.

Made during the First World War the title clearly alludes to a Red Cross Nurse and is often erroneously labelled as "The Red Cross Nurse". Dressler at the time was putting effort into patriotic wartime activities and this is one of her few films from this period.

== Plot ==
A nurse (Dressler) works in a sanatorium. When it is rumoured that she has become an heiress, a number of potential suitors book themselves into the sanatorium to try to woo her.

== Cast ==
- Marie Dressler as the nurse
