= Jacquie Lyn =

English child actress (1928–2002)

Elizabeth Anne Mary Jacqueline Dufton
- Born: Elizabeth Anne Mary Jacqueline Dufton; 3 September 1928; Croydon, Surrey, England, UK
- Died: 21 March 2002 (aged 73); Granada Hills, California, U.S.
- Other names: Jackie Lyn Dufton; Jacquelyn Woll; Jacquie Lynn
- Occupation: Child actress
- Years active: 1931–1932
- Spouse(s): Martin Woll (1950–2002) (three sons, one daughter)

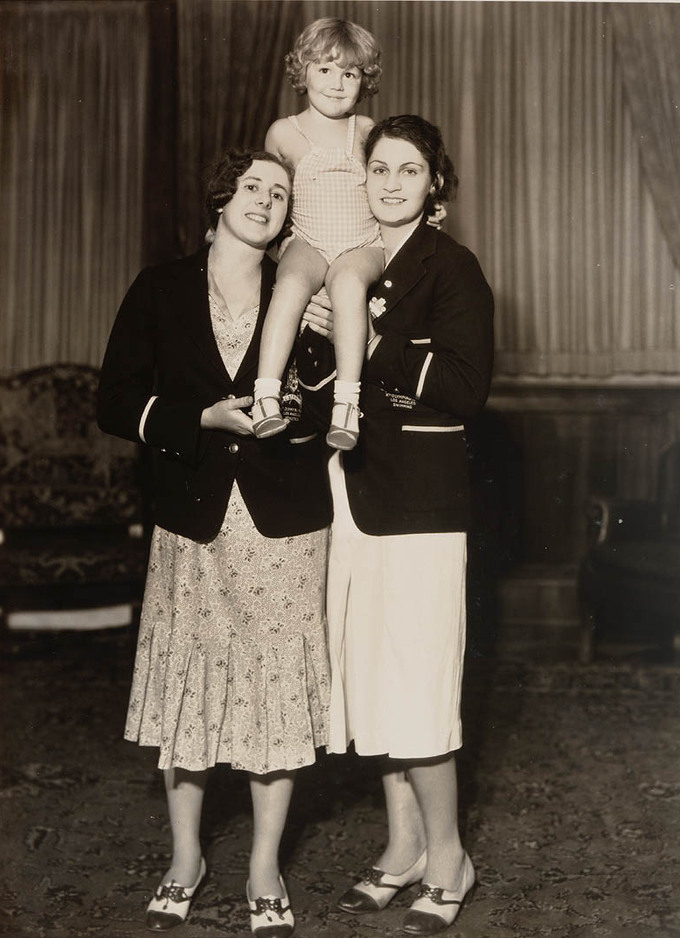
L–R: Eileen Wearne, Jacquie Lyn and Clare Dennis

Jacquie Lyn (born Elizabeth Anne Mary Jacqueline Dufton; 3 September 1928 – 21 March 2002) was a British-born American child actress, who had a brief yet notable career in motion pictures.

== Career ==
Lyn was born at 8 Sandfield Road, Croydon, Surrey (now in London). After making her debut appearance in the 1931 Fox Film Corporation film Wicked, Lyn was cast by producer Hal Roach in his Our Gang comedies. Lyn was featured prominently in two 1932 Our Gang shorts, Free Wheeling ("Spanky, don't you think we are riding rather fast?") and Birthday Blues. She also appeared in a significant supporting role in Laurel and Hardy's 1932 feature film Pack Up Your Troubles, the role for which she is best remembered.

== Rediscovery ==
Lyn's career at Hal Roach Studios ended when her stepfather demanded more money for her services. She grew up, married, changed her name to Jacquelyn Woll, and was not heard from until the early 1990s. Woll's son had purchased a Laurel & Hardy videotape for her; the tape was introduced by Stan Laurel's daughter Lois, who related that Laurel & Hardy fans worldwide were searching for the whereabouts of Jacquie Lyn. Woll contacted The Sons of the Desert, the official Laurel & Hardy fanclub, and was reintroduced to the public, becoming an honorary member of the organization.

== Death ==
Woll died of natural causes on 21 March 2002 in Granada Hills, California, aged 73.

== Filmography ==
Year	Title	Role	Notes
1931	Wicked	Tonia	
1932	The Strange Love of Molly Louvain	Ann Marie	Uncredited
1932	Pack Up Your Troubles	Eddie's Baby	
1932	Prosperity	Cissy Warren	
