= You Can't Buy Everything =

1934 film by Charles Reisner

- Directed by: Charles Reisner; Sandy Roth
- Written by: Dudley Nichols; Lamar Trotti; Zelda Sears; Eve Greene
- Starring: May Robson; Jean Parker; Lewis Stone
- Cinematography: Leonard Smith
- Edited by: Ben Lewis
- Music by: William Axt
- Production companies: Cosmopolitan Productions; Metro-Goldwyn-Mayer
- Distributed by: Loew's, Inc.
- Release date: January 26, 1934
- Running time: 82 minutes
- Country: United States
- Language: English

You Can't Buy Everything is a 1934 American pre-Code romantic drama film directed by Charles Reisner and Sandy Roth and starring May Robson, Jean Parker and Lewis Stone. It was released by Metro-Goldwyn-Mayer. Working titles of the film were Rich Widow and Old Hannibal. According to Motion Picture Herald, the principal character of Hannah Bell (played by May Robson) was modeled after Hetty Green, famous as the miserly "Witch of Wall Street."

== Plot ==
Christmas 1893 New York City. Mrs. Hannah Bell drags her son Donny on a sled through the snow to a children's clinic, where she gives a false name in order to avoid paying. She reads in the newspaper that John Burton has been named vice president of the Knickerbocker Bank. Furious, she goes to see her father's old friend, bank president Asa Cabot, and insists on withdrawing all of her—very substantial—assets, immediately. She refuses to speak to Burton, who offers to resign and to compensate the bank for the loss of her account. Cabot refuses the resignation and takes Hannah to the vaults.

Kate Farley visits the clinic (which she generously supports) and recognizes Donny. They catch up. Kate visits Hannah and gently Kate insists that Hannah donate $500 to the clinic under her real name.

In 1904, on her way to her current bank, Hannah dupes a conductor into paying for her ticket. Clipping coupons in her own vault—her assets are equal to the bank's—she says she is saving everything for her son. A client recognizes her as the “tightest tightwad” in New York.

Donny is the valedictorian of his graduating class at Princeton University. He wants to become a writer, but Hannah insist he go into the bank—and write letters.

In 1906, Kate invites Dr. Lorimer to visit her in Newport and evaluate Hannah—whom he calls “Hannibal”. Hannah’s mental state has worsened over 30 years, ever since she married fortune-hunter Harry Bell, who died leaving her to raise Donny in poverty. Her marriage to John Burton was called off at the last minute: He sailed for Europe. Lorimer suggests bringing them together, not to reconcile them, but to learn what has, in his words, “scarred” Hannah.

Cut to Kate struggling to give Hannah a new hairdo, a new evening dress and silk stockings. Hannah is secretly pleased. Burton cannot make the party. The next day, on a yacht party Hannah refused to attend, Lorimer introduces Donny to Burton's daughter, Elizabeth.

Hannah is furious to learn that Donny met Burton, exposing Kate's plot, but the young people continue to meet. Almost a year later, he proposes. Elizabeth is afraid that he cannot stand up to his domineering mother.

Hannah storms into Burton's office and accuses him of trying to get her money through Elizabeth. He refuses to interfere with the couple, although he is afraid that Donny has—like his mother—inherited Hannah's father's “taint”: pathological avarice.

Cut to the bridal party exiting the church among crowds of friends. Hannah watches from behind a tree.

The Panic of 1907. The Clearing House Committee appeals to Hannah for a desperately needed loan, backed by gilt edge securities. When she sees a $5 million demand loan on Burton's own railroad shares, which he has used as security for cash to pay his depositors, she agrees. Hannah calls the loan. Burton forfeits his stock rather than abandon his depositors.

Donny and Elizabeth return from their honeymoon in Europe to headlines about Hannah wresting control of the railroad from Burton. At the bank, Donny confronts Hannah in the vault, declaring she has never loved anything—including him. Donny says he does not blame Burton for walking out after she and her father tried to get him to sign an agreement never to touch her money. He shows her the paper, which Burton kept. He does not believe that she did not know. Hannah follows him into the street, hands full of bills, which she throws away. A crowd pounces on them. Cut to Hannah, sitting on a park bench in a cold winter night.

Donny and Elizabeth are packing. He has work at a newspaper in San Francisco, revitalized after the 1906 earthquake. Kate encourages them to see Hannah. He refuses.

Hannah is in Kate's house, in her fourth week of pneumonia. Donny comes in, and they embrace, weeping. She asks her daughter-in-law's pardon, and they also embrace. Burton comes into the room, thanking her for returning the railroad stocks, which she dismisses. Dr. Lorimer says she has had enough excitement for one day. She snaps back. “Say, whose pneumonia is this, yours or mine?”

== Cast ==
- May Robson as Mrs. Hannah Bell
- Jean Parker as Elizabeth "Beth" Burton Bell
- Lewis Stone as John Burton
- Mary Forbes as Kate Farley
- Reginald Mason as Dr. Lorimer
- William Bakewell as Donny "Don" Bell as a Man
- Tad Alexander as Donny Bell as a Boy
- Walter Walker as Josiah Flagg
- Reginald Barlow as Tom Sparks
- Claude Gillingwater as Asa Cabot
- Walter Brennan as Train Vendor (uncredited)
- Fred Lee as President Wilson at Princeton (uncredited)

== Reception ==
In his February 3, 1934 review for The New York Times, Mordaunt Hall had praise for the cast but not for the film, “a heavy handed narrative in which the avaricious nature of the leading character is too exaggerated to be believable….If many of the incidents are forced, Miss Robson's eminently satisfactory acting does cause the picture to hold one's attention. It is quite obvious that the crotchety, mercenary old person will at the close leave the screen with a smile and forgive her son for having married Burton's daughter…Miss Robson assuredly gives the impression of a woman with a greed for gold. As Hannah she is quick tempered and her most enjoyable hours are spent in the vault of a bank. It is a pity that the various incidents were not written and directed more deftly, for one senses that notwithstanding what has happened in real life, the doings of Hannah are exaggerated.“

Hall gave the film more column space in The New York Times in his February 11, 1934, column “Pictures on and Off Broadway”.
