= Pack Up Your Troubles (1932 film) =

1932 film by Ray McCarey and George Marshall

- US lobby card
- Directed by: George Marshall; Raymond McCarey
- Written by: H. M. Walker; Stan Laurel (uncredited)
- Produced by: Hal Roach
- Starring: Stan Laurel; Oliver Hardy; James Finlayson; Don Dillaway
- Cinematography: Art Lloyd
- Edited by: Richard C. Currier
- Music by: Marvin Hatley
- Production company: Hal Roach Studios
- Distributed by: Metro-Goldwyn-Mayer
- Release date: September 17, 1932
- Running time: 68 minutes
- Country: United States
- Language: English

Pack Up Your Troubles is a 1932 pre-Code Laurel and Hardy film directed by George Marshall and Raymond McCarey, named after the World War I song "Pack Up Your Troubles in Your Old Kit-Bag, and Smile, Smile, Smile". It is the team's second feature-length film.

== Plot ==
The date is 1917, and war has been declared. Laurel and Hardy are conscripted into the American Expeditionary Force during World War I, where their ineptitude enrages their drill sergeant, who relegates them to kitchen duties. A disgruntled cook gives them a sarcastic instruction, which leads them to deposit garbage cans in the general's private home. This lands Pvt. Laurel, Pvt, Hardy, and the cook in the guard house, and the cook vows revenge if he ever catches up with them again.

Stan and Ollie are friendly with soldier Eddie Smith, who tragically succumbs to combat and leaves his daughter an orphan. Stan and Ollie are determined to rescue Eddie's daughter from her abusive guardian and reunite her with Eddie's parents.

Following the armistice, their endeavors lead them to New York City in pursuit of the girl and Eddie's family. During their travels they encounter myriad obstacles, including mistaken identities, physical altercations, and bureaucratic resistance. Undeterred, they persist in their mission, and try to raise enough money to leave town with the little girl. Their unusual approach is mistaken for an actual bank robbery, and now both the police and the orphanage officials are after them. The bank president turns out to be the very individual they had been seeking: Eddie's father. The unexpected revelation not only absolves them of their transgressions but also elevates them to honored guests with a promise of a lavish meal, marking a triumphant conclusion to their odyssey. However, the banker's chef happens to be the same army cook who vowed revenge after they were imprisoned together, and he chases Stan and Ollie out of the banker's home with his knife.

== Cast ==
- Stan Laurel as Stan
- Oliver Hardy as Ollie
- Donald Dillaway as Eddie Smith
- Jacquie Lyn as Eddie's Baby
- Mary Carr as Eddie's mother-in-law, with letter
- James Finlayson as General
- Richard Cramer as Uncle Jack
- Adele Watson as Annie
- Tom Kennedy as Recruiting Sergeant
- Charles Middleton as Welfare Assistance Officer
- Richard Tucker as Mr. Smith, Sr.
- Grady Sutton as The Wrong Eddie
- Muriel Evans as Wrong Eddie's Bride
- C. Montague Shaw as Wrong Eddie's Father
- Billy Gilbert as Mr. Hathaway
- Charley Rogers as Rogers
- George Marshall as Pierre (uncredited)
- Charlie Hall as Janitor (uncredited)

== Production ==
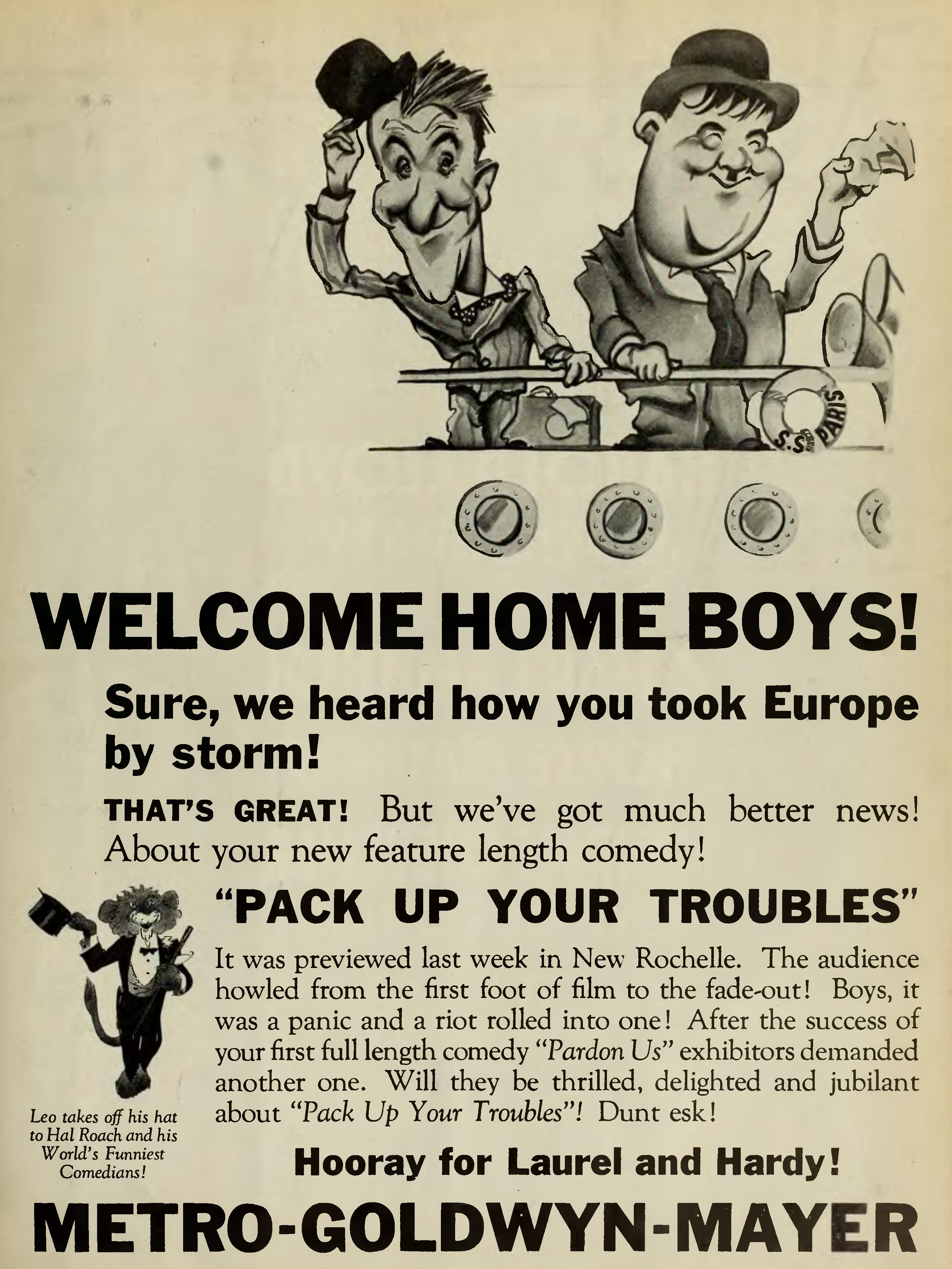
Pack Up Your Troubles ad from The Film Daily, 1932

The recruitment scenes were filmed at what is now Will Rogers Memorial Park, a public park in Beverly Hills, California.

== Reception ==
"The whole family will enjoy the antics of Laurel and Hardy as reluctant World War I recruits," wrote Motion Picture Reviews, a publication devoted to reporting current films' suitability for youngsters. "It's an entertaining, farcical comedy, yet the unexpected bits of pathos give it depth and a charm that is altogether delightful." Canadian Motion Picture Digest reported, "Pack Up Your Troubles with Laurel and Hardy was made for laughs, and how we laughed. In fact, it demonstrated that one could laugh until their sides ached, and many a rib reached a point where self-control or breaking a rib appeared in the alternative. Laurel and Hardy were never funnier than in Pack Up Your Troubles." Gus McCarthy of Motion Picture Herald noted that the public knew Laurel and Hardy largely from short subjects, and offered sales advice to exhibitors: "The toughest part of putting this picture across to your patrons will be to convince them that it is a feature-length production that moves with all the rib-tickling speed of a short subject, yet has a serious objective. The is, if the laughable antics of Laurel and Hardy can ever be dignified by the term 'seriousness'."

Latter-day reviews have been mixed. Leonard Maltin wrote, "Daffy duo are drafted during WW 1 ... Good fun." Leslie Halliwell gave it one of four stars: "Patchy comedy vehicle in which too many gags are not fully thought out or timed."

== Revivals ==
Film Classics re-released the film in 1945. Author Scott MacGillivray writes: "For the reissue of Pack Up Your Troubles, five minutes of disagreeable domestic-abuse scenes involving a brutish villain were deleted. Laurel & Hardy were not involved in part of this sequence, and the cuts had no effect on the film's continuity. For 40 years, every print of Pack Up Your Troubles -- for theaters, television, and home movies -- had the Film Classics edits."

The film was restored to its original length in 1986 for The Laurel & Hardy Show, a syndicated TV series showcasing many of the team's films. This same full-length version was reprinted on 16mm film for libraries and private collectors by David Shepard of Blackhawk Films.

== Preservation ==
In recent years Pack Up Your Troubles has been restored by the UCLA Film and Television Archive from the 35mm nitrate original picture negative, a 35mm nitrate lavender positive, a 35mm master positive, and a 35mm nitrate variable density track negative. Restoration funding was provided by the Hobson/Lucas Family Foundation. The restoration had its world premiere at the 2024 UCLA Festival of Preservation.
