= Reducing (film) =

1931 film

- Theatrical release poster
- Directed by: Charles Reisner
- Screenplay by: Beatrice Banyard; Robert E. Hopkins; Willard Mack; Zelda Sears
- Starring: Marie Dressler; Polly Moran; Anita Page; Lucien Littlefield; William Collier, Jr. Sally Eilers
- Cinematography: Leonard Smith
- Edited by: William LeVanway
- Production company: Metro-Goldwyn-Mayer
- Distributed by: Metro-Goldwyn-Mayer
- Release date: January 3, 1931
- Running time: 77 minutes
- Country: United States
- Language: English
- Budget: $222,000
- Box office: $1,505,000 (worldwide rentals)

Reducing is a 1931 American pre-Code comedy film directed by Charles Reisner and written by Beatrice Banyard, Robert E. Hopkins, Willard Mack and Zelda Sears. The film stars Marie Dressler, Polly Moran, Anita Page, Lucien Littlefield, William Collier, Jr. and Sally Eilers. The film was released on January 3, 1931, by Metro-Goldwyn-Mayer.

== Plot ==
The snobbish Madame Pauline "Polly" Rochay operates an exclusive beauty parlor in New York City that specializes in weight reduction. When she learns that her sister, Marie Truffle, is destitute, Polly decides to take her, her husband Elmer and their three children, Vivian, Jerry and Marty, from South Bend, Indiana, into her home. Joyce, Polly's socialite daughter, objects to her mother's decision, insisting that the Truffles are too unrefined to live among the Rochays. When the Truffles finally arrive in the big city, Polly puts her sister to work at her salon while Elmer looks for work as a mail carrier. Joyce resents the intrusion of the ill-mannered Truffles, and Polly concurs with her when the meddlesome Marie damages the beauty parlor and her children scratch her car.

One evening, while Joyce is out on a date with her playboy sweetheart, Johnnie Beasley, Marie and Polly compare their daughters' boyfriends. Polly boasts that Johnnie is the better because he is a sophisticated millionaire, while Marie informs Polly that Tommy Haverly, Vivian's boyfriend, is from one of the oldest families in South Bend. Polly then insults Marie when she tells her that Vivian will never meet the same caliber of men that Joyce meets. When Johnnie brings Joyce home, he meets Vivian and takes an immediate liking to her, which makes Joyce jealous. The next day, after spurning Tommy, Vivian accepts a lunch date with Johnnie, believing Joyce will be there as well. Joyce later accuses Vivian of trying to steal her boyfriend. At the salon, Marie makes a nuisance of herself with a series of errors, including allowing Polly to be locked in the steam room. Later, Polly and Marie become embroiled in their daughters' quarrel over Johnnie, and Marie strikes Joyce when Joyce insults Vivian, leading Polly to tell the Truffles to leave.

Three months pass, and the Truffles, now settled into their own home, await the arrival of Johnnie, who has been dating Vivian and will be escorting her to a party. While Vivian and Johnnie are out on their date, the heartbroken Joyce visits Marie and begs her aunt to help her, as she is in "terrible trouble". Moved by her show of emotion and implied plight, Marie agrees to help Joyce. She goes to Johnnie's to confront him, armed with a Civil War revolver that "hasn't worked since Bull Run". At Johnnie's, Vivian flees when she and Johnnie hear her mother at the door. Marie enters and accuses the young playboy of unfairly turning Joyce's head with fancy cars, yachts and other luxuries and then "giving her the gate". Marie insists that Johnnie marry her niece, which he agrees to do after admitting his father would call him "a rotter" if he knew what he'd done to Joyce. Marie lies to her daughter, telling her that Johnnie was not worthy of her love because he was only seeing her to make Joyce jealous. After Joyce and Johnnie's wedding, Polly, unaware that Marie was responsible for their reunion, calls to gloat about the news and remind Marie that Vivian should have "stayed in her own class." However, Joyce, wanting her mother and aunt to reconcile, admits everything and explains Marie's involvement. Polly visits her sister to thank her for her help, and the two forgive each other.

== Cast ==
- Marie Dressler as Marie Truffle
- Polly Moran as Polly Rochay
- Anita Page as Vivian Truffle
- Lucien Littlefield as Elmer Truffle
- William Collier, Jr. as Johnnie Beasley
- Sally Eilers as Joyce Rochay
- William Bakewell as Tommy Haverly
- Billy Naylor as Jerry Truffle
- Jay Ward as Marty Truffle
