= Tillie's Punctured Romance (1914 film) =

1914 film by Mack Sennett

- 1999 Image Entertainment DVD cover
- Directed by: Mack Sennett
- Written by: Hampton Del Ruth; Craig Hutchinson; Mack Sennett
- Based on: Tillie's Nightmare by A. Baldwin Sloane and Edgar Smith
- Produced by: Mack Sennett
- Starring: Marie Dressler; Mabel Normand; Charles Chaplin; Mack Swain; Charles Bennett; Chester Conklin; The Keystone Cops; Charley Chase (uncredited)
- Cinematography: Hans F. Koenekamp (uncredited); Frank D. Williams (uncredited)
- Production company: Keystone Film Company
- Distributed by: Alco Film Corporation
- Release date: December 21, 1914 (United States)
- Running time: 74 minutes 82 minutes (2003 restoration)
- Country: United States
- Languages: Silent; English intertitles
- Budget: $50,000

Tillie's Punctured Romance is a 1914 American silent comedy film directed by Mack Sennett and starring Marie Dressler, Mabel Normand, Charlie Chaplin, and the Keystone Cops. The picture is the first feature-length comedy and was the only feature-length comedy made by the Keystone Film Company.

At the time of production Marie Dressler was a major stage star, and in this film Chaplin and Normand support her as leads within Keystone's stock company of actors.

The film, based on Dressler's stage play Tillie's Nightmare by A. Baldwin Sloane and Edgar Smith, is the first feature-length slapstick comedy in all of cinema.

This was the last time Charlie Chaplin acted in a film that he neither wrote nor directed. He plays a slightly different role from his Tramp character, which was relatively new at the time. However, he retains a moustache (here a pencil-thin "dude" type rather than his usual "toothbrush"), thin cane and distinctive walk.

Tillie provides an early example of film within a film, when the couple go to the cinema to watch A Thief's Fate, large sections of which are seen.

== Plot ==
Tillie's Punctured Romance

A womanizing city man, Charlie, meets Tillie in the country after a fight with his girlfriend. When he sees that Tillie's father has a very large bankroll for his workers, he persuades her to elope with him. In the city, he meets the woman he was seeing already, and tries to work around the complication to steal Tillie's money. He gets Tillie drunk in a restaurant and asks her to let him hold the pocketbook. Since she is drunk, she agrees, and he escapes with his old girlfriend and the money.

Later that day, they see a Keystone film in a nickelodeon entitled "A Thief's Fate" (which is a melodrama, a type of film Keystone did not produce) which illustrates their thievery in the form of a morality play. They both feel guilty and leave the theater. While sitting on a park bench, a paperboy asks him to buy a newspaper. He does so, and reads the story about Tillie's Uncle Banks, a millionaire who died while on a mountain-climbing expedition. Tillie is named sole heir and inherits three million dollars. The man leaves his girlfriend on the park bench and runs to the restaurant, where Tillie is now forced to work to support herself as she is too embarrassed to go home. He begs her to take him back and although she is skeptical at first, she believes that he truly loves her and they marry. They move into the uncle's mansion and throw a big party, which ends horribly when Tillie finds her husband with his old girlfriend, smuggled into the house and working as one of their maids.

The uncle is found on a mountaintop, alive after all. He goes back to his mansion, in disarray after Tillie instigated a gunfight (a direct result of the husband smuggling the old girlfriend into the house), which does not injure anyone. Uncle Banks insists that Tillie be arrested for the damage she has caused to his house. The three run from the cops all the way to a dock, where a car "bumps" Tillie into the water. She flails about, hoping to be rescued. She is eventually pulled to safety, and both Tillie and the man's girlfriend realize that they are too good for him. He leaves, and the two girls become friends.

== Cast ==
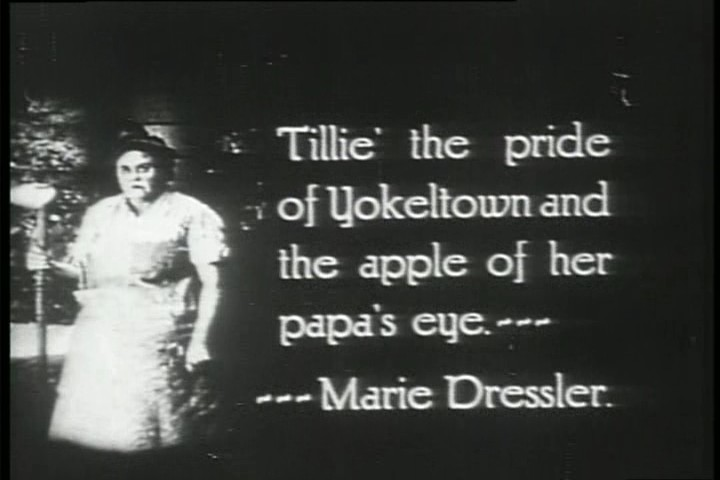
Description of Marie Dressler's character

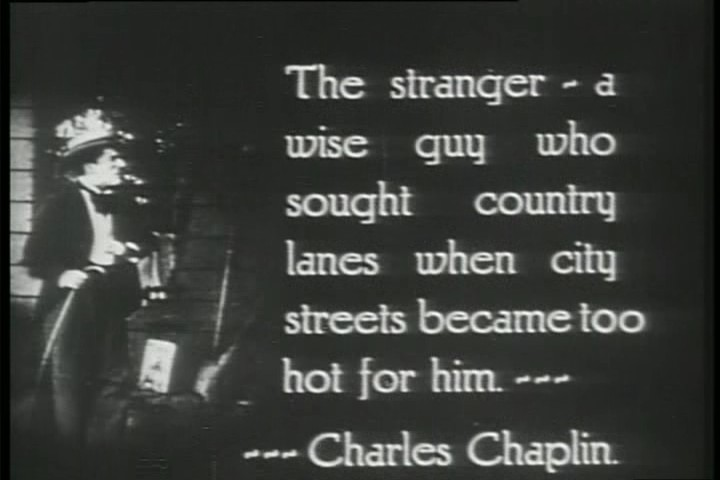
Description of Charlie Chaplin's character

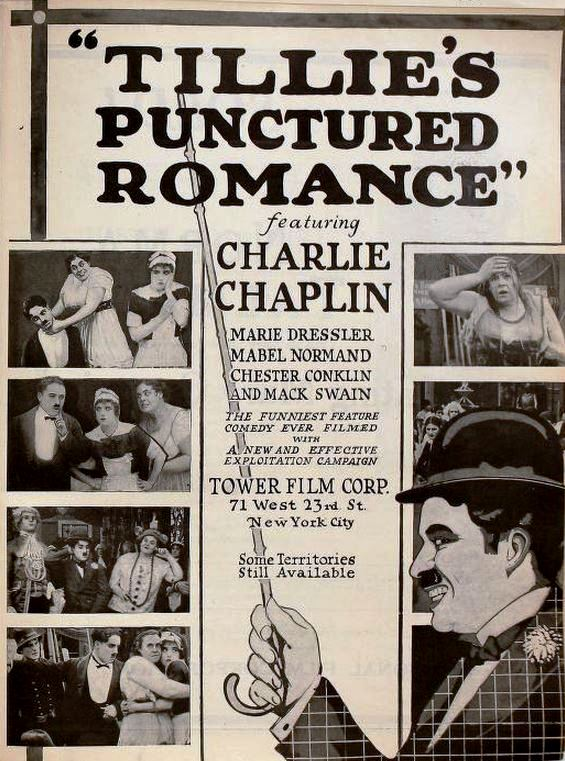
Re-release poster with different billing and picture featuring Chaplin's Tramp, who does not appear in the film

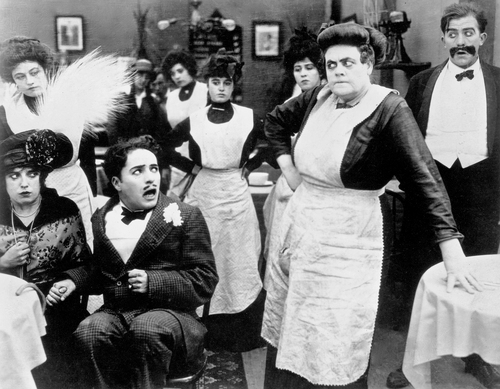
Scene with Normand, Chaplin and Dressler

- Marie Dressler as Tillie Banks, Country Girl
- Mabel Normand as Mabel, Charlie's Girl Friend
- Charles Chaplin as Charlie, City Slicker
- Mack Swain as John Banks, Tillie's Father
- Charles Bennett as Uncle Banks, Tillie's Millionaire Uncle

Uncredited

- Dan Albert as Party Guest/Cop
- Phyllis Allen as Prison Matron/Restaurant Patron
- Billie Bennett as Maid/Party Guest
- Joe Bordeaux as Policeman (appearance is not verified)
- Glen Cavender as First Pianist in Restaurant
- Charley Chase as Detective in Movie Theater
- Dixie Chene as Guest
- Nick Cogley as Keystone Cop Desk Sergeant
- Chester Conklin as Mr. Whoozis/Singing Waitor
- Alice Davenport as Guest
- Hampton Del Ruth as Bank's Tall Secretary Searching for Tillie
- Frankie Dolan as Movie Spectator/Party Guest
- Minta Durfee as Maid
- Ted Edwards as Waiter
- Edwin Frazee as Movie Spectator/Guest/Cop
- Billy Gilbert as Policeman
- Gordon Griffith as Newsboy
- William Hauber as Servant/Cop
- Fred Fishback as Servant
- Alice Howell as Guest
- Edgar Kennedy as Restaurant Owner/Butler
- Grover Ligon as Keystone Cop
- Wallace MacDonald as Keystone Cop
- Hank Mann as Keystone Cop
- Harry McCoy as Second Pianist in Restaurant/Pianist in Theater/Servant
- Rube Miller as Tillie's Visitor
- Charles Murray as Detective in "A Thief's Fate"
- Eva Nelson as Disgusted Guest in 2nd Restaurant
- Edward Nolan as Restaurant Dancer/Policeman/Mountain Innkeeper/Party Guest
- Frank Opperman as Reverend D. Simpson
- Hugh Saxon as Bank's Shorter Secretary Searching for Tillie
- Fritz Schade as Waiter/Diner
- Al St. John as Keystone Cop
- Slim Summerville as Keystone Cop
- Josef Swickard as Movie Spectator
- Morgan Wallace as Thief in "A Thief's Fate"

== Production ==
Mack Sennett, whilst working with a degree of autonomy, was working for the larger company of Kessel and Baumann.

When slapstick impresario Mack Sennett proposed to adapt the 1910 Broadway comedy Tillie's Nightmare to the screen in 1914, he enlisted the immensely successful star of the stage production, the then 45-year-old Marie Dressler, to play the guileless ingenue, Tillie Banks. Dressler was paid a huge fee of £2500 per week and was also meant to have a share of the profits of Kessler and Baumann but they passed the distribution contract to Alco, voiding Dressler's contract with K & B and forcing Dressler to sue them. The situation was further complicated by Alco going bust, mainly due to overpaying for the distribution rights: £100,000. Chaplin's salary was far less than Dressler, certainly under $1000 a week, as he demanded an increase to $1000 a week early in 1915.

Comedian Charles Chaplin, who had been with Sennett's studio since December 1913, was selected to play opposite Dressler as Charlie, an unscrupulous playboy and bounder. Though Chaplin's signature "The Tramp" character was already well-developed in other Sennett one- and two-reel films (he had already appeared in more than 30 shorts as the Tramp by the time), here he abandons the sweet-natured hobo to play a villain. The contrast between the diminutive, "bow-legged" Chaplin and the bovine and "bulky" Dressler, adds to the absurdity of their pairing.

Sennett's augmentation of the film length from two reels to six reels provided him with sufficient scope to showcase his ensemble of talented players in numerous venues:

"...many scenes are shot on location, and Sennett intercuts deftly to four different locations. The film’s final reel is a comedic crescendo, building from a brief pie fight to mayhem caused by Tillie firing a pistol indiscriminately, culminating with a farcical chase on a pier featuring the Keystone Cops on land and sea".

The film, which cost roughly $50,000 ($1.2 million in 2015) to make, was based on the Broadway play Tillie's Nightmare, in which Dressler had great success on Broadway and on tour in the United States from 1910 to 1912. Dressler would revive the play with her own touring company.

Milton Berle always claimed that he played the five-year-old paperboy in the film. but the role was actually portrayed by Gordon Griffith.

This is one of only two films (the other is Making a Living, his first film, where he also plays a "dude" non-Tramp character) in which both Chaplin and the Keystone Cops appear.

== Reception ==
Following its December 21, 1914 premiere at the Los Angeles Republic Theatre, the film was a tremendous success. As the Mutual Film Corporation, distributors of all Keystone shorts, was not equipped to handle features from them, Tillie became the only Keystone production to be distributed by the newly formed (and short-lived) Alco Film Corporation. It remained in theatrical release for years, being continually re-edited and shortened, and much later having optical soundtracks added featuring music, sound effects and narration.

== Home media ==
For decades the film was only available in poor quality, truncated prints, but eventually David Shepard of Film Preservation Associates released his restoration on LaserDisc (1997) and DVD (1999) via Image Entertainment. It was coupled with Mabel's Married Life (1914), another Keystone film featuring Normand, Chaplin and Swain. In 2003 a second restoration, a collaboration between UCLA Film and Television Archive and the British Film Institute, used more complete, higher quality materials and saw Tillie returned almost to its original length. This version has been released in the fully restored Chaplin at Keystone four-DVD box set (2010) by various labels worldwide.

== Sequels ==
Dressler appeared as Tillie in three more films, Tillie's Tomato Surprise (1915), Tillie Wakes Up (1917), and The Scrub Lady (1917), aka Tillie the Scrub Lady.

In Tillie Wakes Up, the Tillie character is married and so has a different surname.

=== The 1928 film ===
Another comedy called Tillie's Punctured Romance was released in 1928 starring W. C. Fields as a circus ringmaster. Although often erroneously cited as a remake, the later film actually bears no resemblance to the 1914 film aside from the shared title and that Chester Conklin and Mack Swain appear in both films.

=== In popular culture ===
In The Simpsons episode American History X-cellent, one of Mr. Burns' belongings includes a ticket stub for Tillie's Punctured Romance.

== See also ==
- List of United States comedy films
- Charlie Chaplin filmography

== Sources ==
- "33. Tillie's Punctured Romance". BFI. September 2006. Charlie Chaplin. Archived from the original on June 29, 2006.
- Lee, Betty (1997). Marie Dressler: the unlikeliest star. University of Kentucky Press. ISBN 0-8131-2036-5.
- "Empire". Reading Eagle. March 21, 1915. p. 12.
- Pendleton, David. 2004. Tillie's Punctured Romance, 1914. UCLA Film and Television Archive: 12th Festival of Preservation, July 22-August 21, 2004. Festival guest handbook.
