= Tillie Wakes Up =

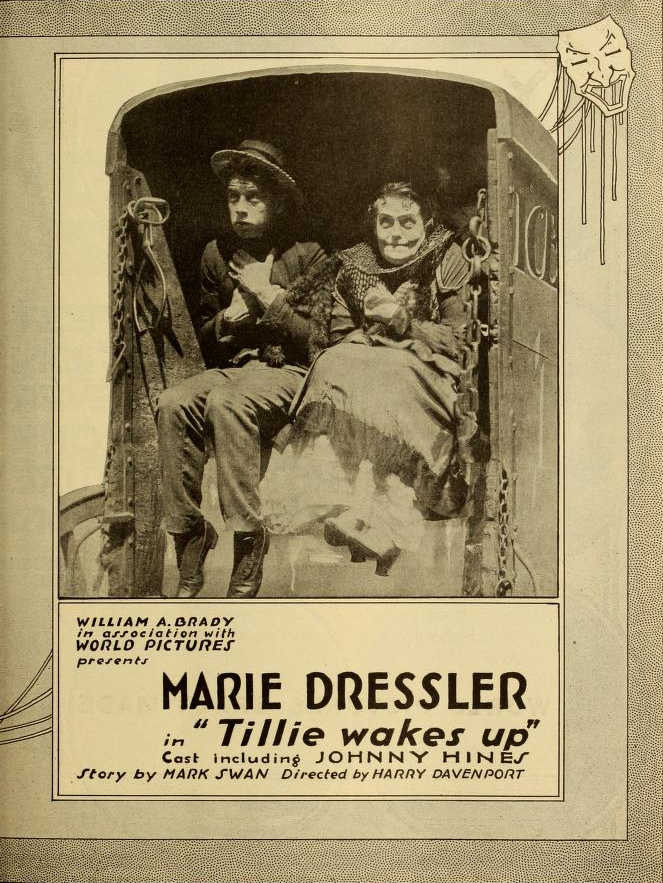
- An advertisement for the movie which ran in The Moving Picture World.
- Directed by: Harry Davenport
- Written by: Frances Marion
- Story by: Mark Swan
- Starring: Marie Dressler; Johnny Hines; Rubye De Remer
- Cinematography: Edward Horn
- Distributed by: World Film Corporation
- Release date: January 29, 1917 (USA)
- Running time: 47 minutes
- Country: United States
- Language: Silent (English intertitles)

Tillie Wakes Up, also known as Meal Ticket (Working title: Tillie's Night Out), is a 1917 United States|American]] slapstick comedy film, and a quasi-sequel to Tillie's Punctured Romance (1914) and Tillie's Tomato Surprise (1915) starring Marie Dressler as Tillie for the third time, albeit with a different last name in Tillie Wakes Up, which could be explained by the fact that her character has been married. The film was produced by Peerless Pictures Studios and the World Film Corporation, directed by Harry Davenport, and written by Frances Marion from a story by Mark Swan. The supporting cast features Johnny Hines, Frank Beamish, Rubye De Remer, Ruth Barrett and Jack Brawn. A print of Tillie Wakes Up exists.

The film takes place in the Coney Island amusement park.

== Synopsis ==
Tillie and her neighbor Mr. Pipkins are both distraught over their respective marriages. One day, they sneak off to have a lively time at Coney Island. They flee the park together just as their spouses come to find them. After a chase, each is rescued from the ocean and reconcile with their respective spouses.

== Cast ==
- Marie Dressler as Tillie Tinkelpaw
- Johnny Hines as J. Mortimer Pipkins
- Frank Beamish as Henry Tinkelpaw
- Rubye De Remer as Mrs. Luella Pipkins
- Ruth Barrett as Mrs. Nosey
- Jack Brawn as Mr. Nosey
