= Tillie's Tomato Surprise =

- Directed by: Howell Hansel
- Screenplay by: Acton Davies
- Produced by: Siegmund Lubin
- Starring: Marie Dressler; Colin Campbell; Eleanor Fairbanks
- Production company: Lubin Manufacturing Company
- Release date: September 27, 1915 (USA)

Tillie's Tomato Surprise is a 1915 screen sequel to the previous year's Tillie's Punctured Romance again starring Marie Dressler as Tillie. The film was produced by the Lubin Manufacturing Company, directed by Howell Hansel and written by Acton Davies.

The supporting cast features Colin Campbell, Eleanor Fairbanks, Sarah McVicker and Clara Lambert. Originally a six-reel movie, only one reel is known to exist and remains archived at the Library of Congress. A quasi-sequel followed two years later starring Marie Dressler as Tillie for the third time, albeit with a different last name, in Tillie Wakes Up.
