= Triple Trouble (1918 film) =

1919 American silent comedy film

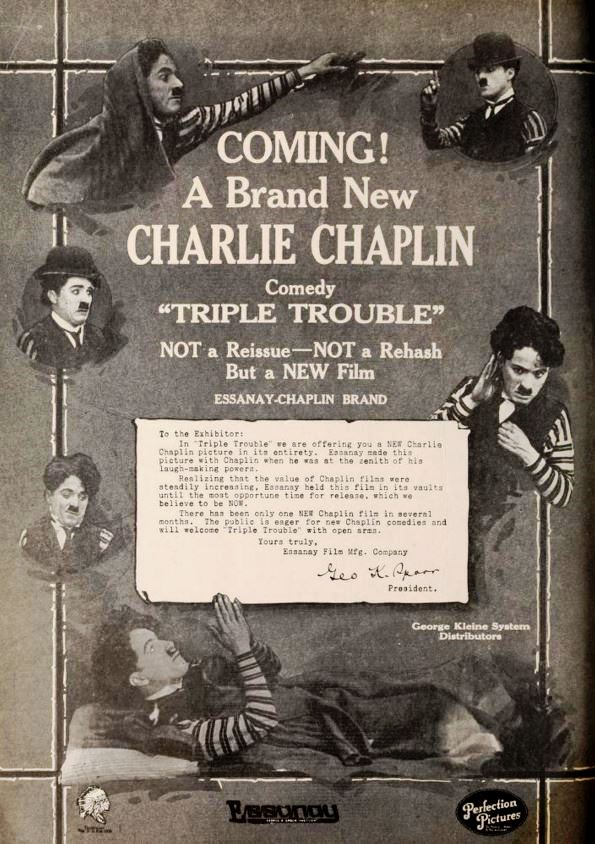
- Advertisement for film
- Directed by: Charlie Chaplin; Leo White
- Written by: Charlie Chaplin; Leo White
- Produced by: Jess Robbins
- Starring: Charlie Chaplin; Billy Armstrong; Edna Purviance; Leo White
- Cinematography: Harry Ensign
- Distributed by: Essanay Studios; General Film Company
- Release date: August 11, 1918
- Running time: 23 minutes (2-reels)
- Country: United States
- Languages: Silent; English intertitles

Triple Trouble is a 1918 two-reel American silent comedy film. It stars Charlie Chaplin, Edna Purviance, and Leo White. This film was not an official Chaplin film, even though it has many Chaplin-directed scenes; after he left the studio, Essanay edited it together using outtakes and newly shot footage directed by White. It had already been established in court that Chaplin had no legal control over the films made during his time with Essanay and could not prevent its release. In his 1967 autobiography, Chaplin included "Triple Trouble" in his filmography.

== Plot ==
Triple Trouble (1918)

Charlie takes a job as a janitor in the home of Colonel Nutt, a munitions manufacturer. As the butler introduces Charlie to the ill-tempered cook, Colonel Nutt demonstrates his new wireless explosive device to his daughter. Meanwhile, agents of the "Pretzelstrass" meet with the Count to devise a plan to get at Colonel Nutt's device. Charlie carelessly dumps garbage all over the maid and her freshly cleaned floor. He takes the trash can and dumps it over the fence, inundating the Count in the process. Back in the kitchen, the maid scolds Charlie, but then she becomes emotional, and he comforts her. The Count enters the house, and is hit by a wet rag thrown by the maid, but intended for Charlie. The Count tosses it off to the side, and it winds up hitting the cook, and when the cook begins to act cruelly towards the maid in return, Charlie sticks up for her. The Count makes his way to the Colonel, who rejects his offers and has the Count ejected by the butler.

His day's work done, Charlie makes his way to a flophouse for a night's sleep. At this point, a pickpocket holds up the Count, but instead of taking his money he agrees to join the caper to liberate Dr. Nutt of his invention. The conversation is overheard by a cop, who then runs off to inform his fellow officers, who are in an abandoned lot, shooting craps. They storm the Nutt house, disrupting its resident, but explain to him that they "are on the trail of a great robbery."

Back at the flophouse, Charlie is prevented from settling down by a loud, singing drunk whom he eventually—and somewhat affectionately—dispatches with a champagne bottle.

A thief steals in during the night and robs the singing drunk, and although Charlie takes what he thinks are adequate precautions, he is also robbed. Charlie disguises himself under the blankets and manages to get his money back from the thief, but when the thief tries to stab him it wakes everyone up and a fight breaks among all of the men. Charlie manages to escape, dodging several cops on the way. However, he runs into the pickpocket on the street; recognizing him as an old friend, Charlie agrees to help him find a target, and leads him to the Nutt house.

The cops are all still there; lying around, smoking, waiting for something to happen. Pandemonium breaks out when the pickpocket enters the house, and amid the chaos, Colonel Nutt's explosive device is detonated, blowing all of the cops skyward. In the aftermath, the pickpocket is buried in a heap of rubble and Charlie is seen poking his head out of the kitchen stove.

== Cast ==
- Charlie Chaplin as The Janitor
- Edna Purviance as Maid
- Leo White as Count and Flophouse keeper
- Billy Armstrong as Cook and Pickpocket
- James T. Kelley as Singing Drunk
- Bud Jamison as Tramp
- Wesley Ruggles as Crook
- Albert Austin as Policeman
- 'Snub' Pollard as Flophouse tramp (uncredited)

== History and background ==
Chaplin's contract with Essanay ended at the beginning of 1916 when he went to Mutual. Police, released on May 27, was his last authorized title with the company. On April 9, 1916 Essanay issued a re-edited version of Chaplin's completed film Burlesque on Carmen but padded with additional material to bring it to a four-reel length. Chaplin filed suit on May 6, but to no avail, as on July 8 the court determined that Essanay had the right to reinvent the client work Chaplin had done for them in any way that they saw fit. This opened the door to a number of subsequent Essanay-Chaplin compilations and re-releases such as The Essanay-Chaplin Revue of 1916 and Chase Me Charlie (1918).

According to publicity material that appeared at the time of its release in August 1918, Triple Trouble represented a new wrinkle in Essanay's strategy: "If you bought a piece of real estate and foresaw that its value would quadruple if you held it a certain length of time, what would you do? That's just what we did with Triple Trouble. [...] We knew there would come a time when it would be worth many times its weight in gold. We held this negative in our vaults for the most opportune time of release, which we believe is NOW." Such hyperbole is somewhat disingenuous; in 1915, Chaplin had begun work on Life, his first feature-length comedy, but Essanay had stepped in and stopped the production as Chaplin was taking too long—what they really needed was one-reel subjects to fill then voracious public demand for Chaplin's work.

Essanay created Triple Trouble, their last "new" Chaplin comedy, by taking at least one—and perhaps two—sequences that had been intended for the unfinished Life, bridging them with outtakes from Police, and through borrowing the ending from Work (1915). In addition, Essanay contrived new material to pad it out to the length of a two-reeler, the standard for comedies by this time; this material was shot in 1918 and directed by character actor Leo White. Though White appeared, most often uncredited, in close to 2000 films, Triple Trouble is the only credit he ever received for direction, and it has been suggested that White was strong-armed into the task. Certainly Chaplin never held it against him, as he continued to hire White as a supporting actor in his own films into the 1940s. Nevertheless, Chaplin's own response was swift; a telegram from Chaplin published in the August 10, 1918 issue of Moving Picture World reads, "THIS IS NOT A NEW CHAPLIN BUT FROM THE ADVERTISING LAYOUT IN TRADE REVIEW MUST BE NOTHING BUT THE DISCARDED PORTIONS OF POLICE THE LAST PICTURE MADE BY CHARLIE CHAPLIN FOR ESSANAY FIRST NATIONAL SHOULD STOP THESE MISLEADING STATEMENTS AND ADVERTISING WHICH MUST BE STAMPED OUT."

== Legacy and preservation ==
Evaluations of the finished film vary; even in 1918, The Moving Picture World called it an "atrocious patch quilt of ancient slapstick reels." A review on the imdb refers to it as "Chaplin's worst film. The story doesn't make any sense" and indeed, the continuity in Triple Trouble is very difficult to follow; the pickpocket knows where the house is as the Count has already directed him towards it, yet he is still looking for a place to rob later in the film, and Charlie directs him towards the house again, presumably double-crossing his employer in the process. In Police, the scene is taken from the opposite angle.

Nevertheless, some have found value in Triple Trouble; in their 1965 book The Films of Charlie Chaplin, Gerald D. McDonald, Michael Conway and Mark Ricci stated that the film "has remarkable continuity and the pieces fit together, almost miraculously." Walter Kerr, in his seminal 1975 book The Silent Clowns, stated that the film was "worthless, except for what it can tell us about the vein Chaplin was tempted to explore in his own kind of feature." As it was, Chaplin did not make an actual feature until The Kid (1921), and he seemed to agree with that aspect of the inherent value of Triple Trouble through including the title in the filmography attached to his autobiography in 1964.

For Essanay, however, their claim that Triple Trouble "would be worth many times its weight in gold" apparently did not pan out. Burdened by the fallout from the loss of final appeals relating to the U.S. Government's anti-trust suit against former Motion Picture Patents Trust companies and an inability to compete in a market dominated by features, Triple Trouble was practically the last new film that Essanay produced. It was followed by a trickle of reissues of older titles that finally petered out in 1920.

== Controversy ==
Police, a 1916 film for which the flophouse sequence may have been intended

There is considerable controversy as to whether the flophouse sequence in Triple Trouble was footage trimmed from Police or part of the uncompleted project Life. The Essanay description of Police filed with the Library of Congress at the time of copyright on May 12, 1916 indicates a deleted scene similar to the content in Triple Trouble: "[Charlie] goes to a lodging house and in order to save his dollar from thieves puts it in his mouth, swallowing it while he sleeps. A crook robs the men in the lodging house but Chaplin takes the money from him. This starts a battle." As part of his television documentary The Chaplin Puzzle (1992), director Don McGlynn included a reconstruction of Police which attempted to re-incorporate the flophouse sequence from Triple Trouble into the earlier film. Some Chaplin scholars felt that the result was unconvincing and that certain incompatible details between the flophouse sequence which remains in Police and that from Triple Trouble indicate that the Triple Trouble material is merely a similar scene, but one derived from an independent project. The issue is regarded as unresolved.

== Preservation status and home media ==
As a Chaplin film in the public domain, sources for Triple Trouble are numerous, and it circulated in 8 and 16mm in the era of home film collecting. The Image DVD version on Chaplin's Essanay Comedies Volume 3 has been adjudged the best available in that—for the most part—it is derived from a 35mm print, and includes one shot that does not appear in other versions.
