= James T. Kelley (actor) =

American actor

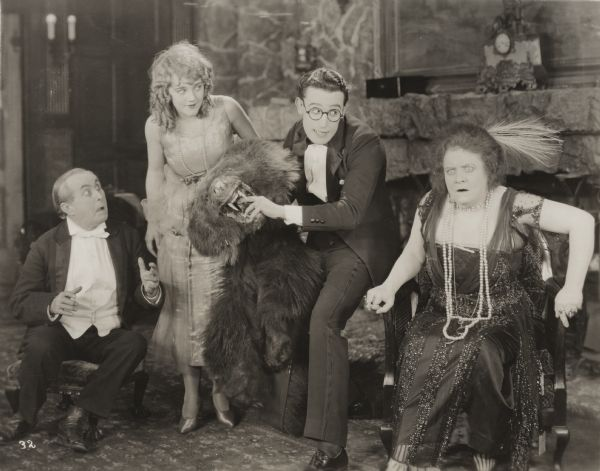
- Kelley in Among Those Present, 1921
- Born: 10 July 1854; Castlebar, County Mayo, Ireland
- Died: 12 November 1933 (aged 79); Los Angeles, California, U.S.
- Occupation: Actor

James T. Kelley (10 July 1854 – 12 November 1933) was an American silent film actor.

== Biography ==
Kelley was born on 10 July 1854 in Castlebar, County Mayo, Ireland. Kelley acted with Charlie Chaplin at Essanay Studios in Los Angeles from 1915, and continued with him at Mutual. His later work included Universal and Hal Roach.

Kelley died on 12 November 1933 in Los Angeles, California.

== Partial filmography ==
- Street Fakers (1915)
- A Night in the Show (1915)
- Police (1916)
- The Floorwalker (1916)
- The Fireman (1916)
- The Vagabond (1916)
- The Count (1916)
- The Pawnshop (1916)
- The Rink (1916)
- Easy Street (1917)
- The Cure (1917)
- A Dog's Life (1918)
- Triple Trouble (1918)
- Never Touched Me (1919)
- An Eastern Westerner (1920)
- Among Those Present (1921)
- Cyclone Bliss (1921)
- Thundering Hoofs (1922)
- Hot Sands (1924)
- Near Dublin (1924)
- The Business of Love (1925)
