= A Night in the Show =

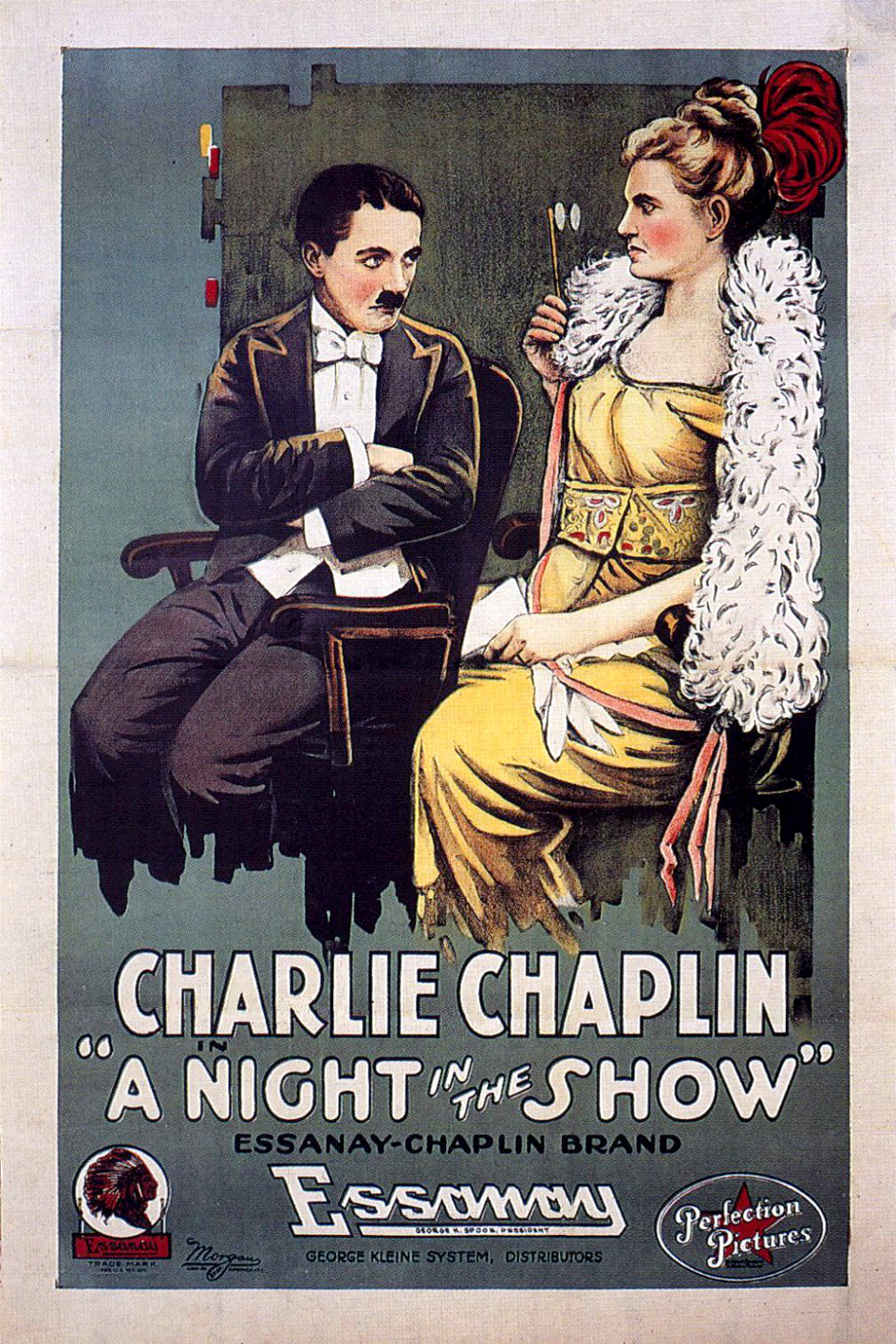
- Theatrical poster to A Night in the Show
- Directed by: Charlie Chaplin
- Written by: Charlie Chaplin
- Produced by: Jess Robbins
- Starring: Charlie Chaplin; Charlotte Mineau; Dee Lampton; Edna Purviance; Leo White
- Cinematography: Harry Ensign
- Edited by: Charlie Chaplin
- Distributed by: Essanay Studios; General Film Company; Warner Bros. (re-release)
- Release dates: November 20, 1915; 1919 (re-release)
- Running time: 30 minutes
- Country: United States
- Languages: Silent; English (original intertitles)

A Night in the Show is a 1915 film and Charlie Chaplin's 12th for Essanay. It was made at Majestic Studio in Los Angeles. Chaplin played two roles: one as Mr. Pest and one as Mr. Rowdy. The film was created from Chaplin's stage work from a play called Mumming Birds (a.k.a. A Night in an English Music Hall in the United States) with the Karno Company from London. Chaplin performed this play during his U.S. tours with Fred Karno's company and decided to bring one of the classic music hall sketches into his film work. Edna Purviance played a minor role as a woman in the audience.

== Plot ==
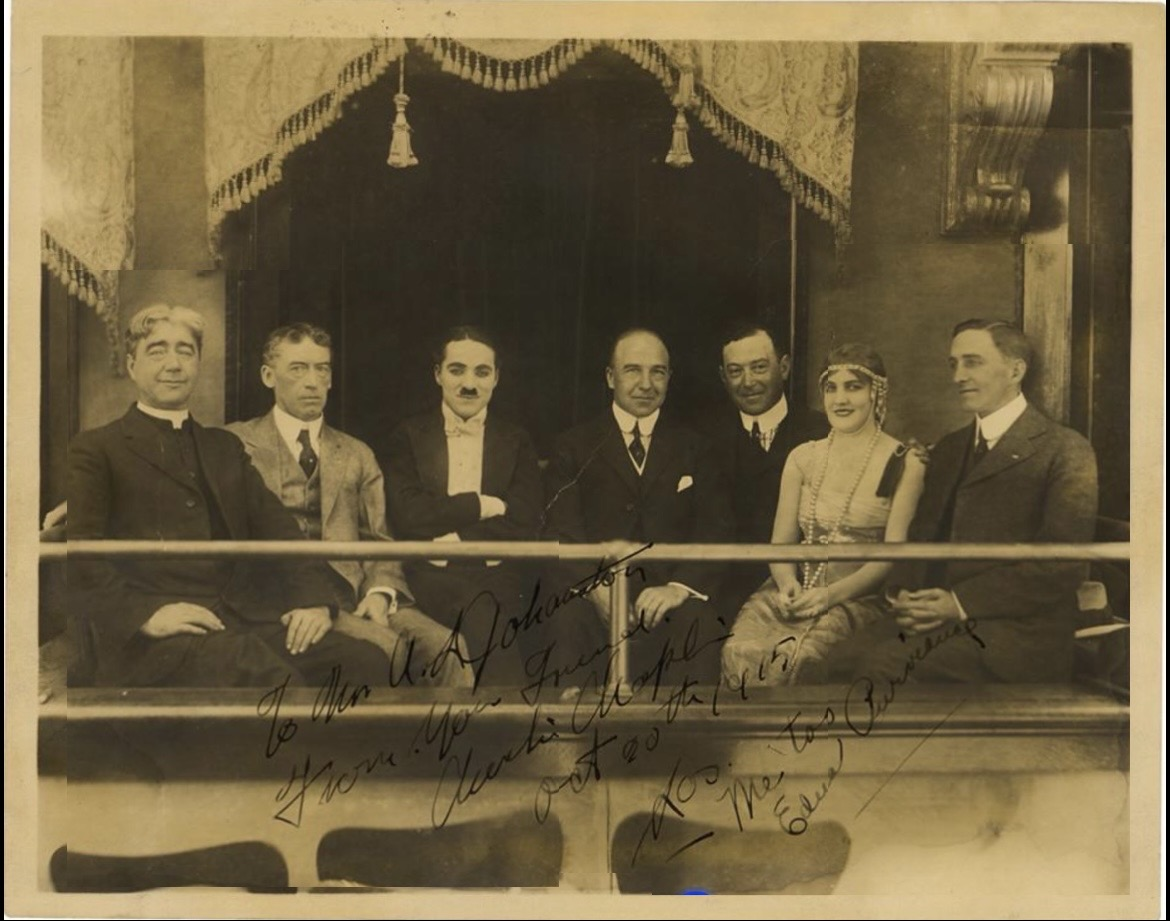
Purviance and Chaplin Entertaining Set Visitors

A Night in the Show

Mr. Pest tries several theatre seats before winding up in front in a fight with the conductor and, eventually, the entire cast of an evening variety show.

The film concludes when a fire eater takes the stage and Chaplin "heroically" drenches the performer and the audience with a fire hose.

The difference between "Mr. Pest" and "Mr. Rowdy" appears to be that one is pleasantly drunk and the other is obnoxious and sober.

== Cast ==
- Charlie Chaplin - Mr. Pest and Mr. Rowdy
- Edna Purviance - Lady in the Stalls with Beads
- Charlotte Mineau - Lady in the Stalls
- Dee Lampton - Fat Boy
- Leo White - Frenchman/Negro in Balcony
- Wesley Ruggles - 2nd Man - Balcony Front Row
- John Rand - Orchestra Conductor
- James T. Kelley - Trombone Player and Singer
- Paddy McGuire - Feather Duster/Clarinet Player
- May White - Fat Lady and Dancer
- Phyllis Allen - Lady in Audience
- Fred Goodwins - Gentleman in Audience
- Charles Inslee - Tuba Player
