= In the Park =

1915 film by Charlie Chaplin

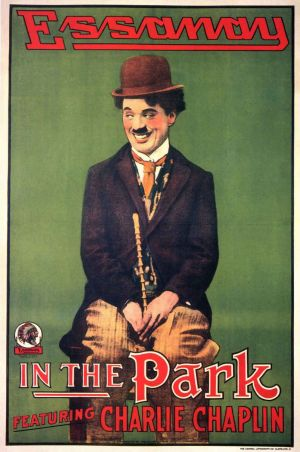
- Theatrical poster to In the Park
- Directed by: Charlie Chaplin
- Written by: Charlie Chaplin
- Produced by: Jess Robbins
- Starring: Leo White; Edna Purviance
- Cinematography: Harry Ensign
- Edited by: Charlie Chaplin
- Distributed by: Essanay Films
- Release date: March 18, 1915
- Running time: 15 minutes (restored version)
- Country: United States
- Languages: Silent; English intertitles

In the Park is Charlie Chaplin's fourth film released in 1915 by Essanay Films. It was his third film while at the Niles Essanay Studio. It was one of several films Charlie Chaplin created in a park setting at the Golden Gate Park in San Francisco. The film co-starred Edna Purviance, Leo White, Lloyd Bacon, and Bud Jamison.

== Plot ==
In the Park

In one of Charlie Chaplin's "park comedies," another tramp is causing havoc. He attempts to pickpocket Charlie, but finds nothing in his pockets. Meanwhile, Charlie stealthily goes through the pickpocket's jacket and steals a cigarette and his matches. Meanwhile, two couples are having romantic interludes on separate benches. The crooked tramp steals one girl's handbag, but swiftly loses it to Charlie when he tries to pickpocket him a second time.

Charlie rescues a hot dog vendor from a thug, but deftly takes a few of the sausages with his cane. Charlie sells the stolen handbag to the other male suitor. A suspicious policemen observes the goings-on and the men realize the bag is stolen and pass it among each other.

Finally Charlie presents it as a gift to the other female and receives an affectionate embrace. The bag's original owner becomes angry with her suitor for permitting her bag to be stolen. The suitor is rejected and reacts hyper-dramatically. He intends to drown himself in the park's lake and asks Charlie to assist him. He presents his behind as a target and Charlie gladly kicks him into the pond. Shortly thereafter he also kicks the other girl's suitor into the pond along with the park policeman.

== Cast ==
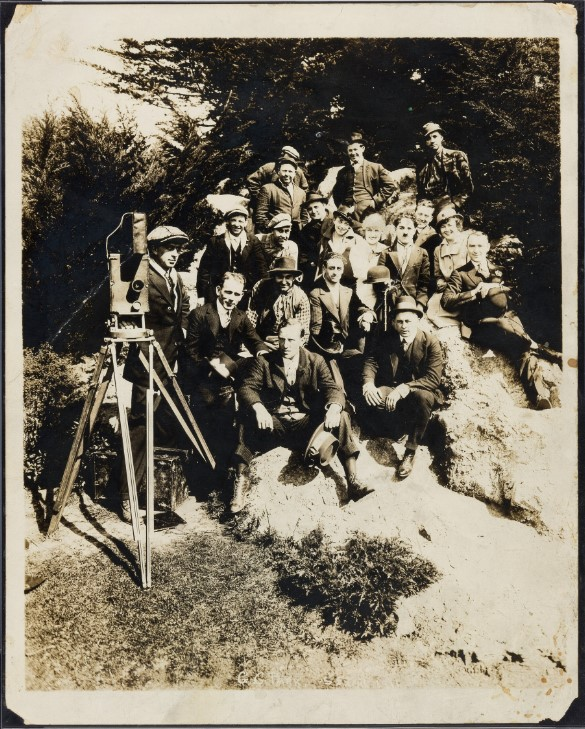
Charlie Chaplin and his crew at the Golden Gate Park in San Francisco

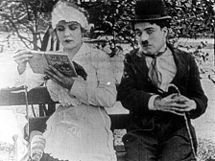
Edna Purviance and Chaplin

- Charlie Chaplin - Charlie
- Edna Purviance - Nursemaid
- Leo White - The Count, Elegant Masher
- Leona Anderson - The Count's Fancy
- Bud Jamison - Edna's Beau
- Billy Armstrong - Sausage Thief
- Ernest Van Pelt - Sausage Seller

== Reception ==
A reviewer from Bioscope wrote, "The one and only Charlie is seen to the best advantage in this riotous farce which is as wildly funny as it is absurd. Unlike many comedians, Chaplin is always amusing. There seem to be no grey patches in his work. It is all one large scarlet scream."
