= Paddy McGuire =

Irish actor

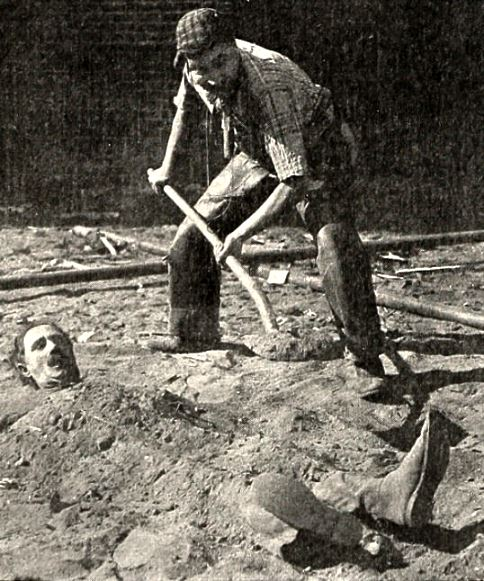
- Still from Jealous Jolts (1916) with Paddy burying Ben Turpin
- Born: 1884; Ireland
- Died: 16 November 1923 (aged 38–39); Norwalk, California, U.S.

Paddy McGuire (né McQuire, 1884 – November 16, 1923) was an Irish actor and comedian.

== Biography ==
Paddy McQuire was born in Ireland in 1884 or 1885. A burlesque comedian with a rubber face, McQuire was a regular supporting player in the films of Charlie Chaplin at the Essanay studio, and he joined Essanay alumnus Ben Turpin at the Vogue company in 1916. Vogue starred or co-starred him in two-reel comedies, first billing him as "Paddy McQuire" and then "Paddy McGuire." In 1917 he joined the Fox comedy company, under the direction of future comedy star Charley Chase. By 1920 McGuire was with the Al Christie studio.

Paddy McGuire died on November 16, 1923, in Norwalk, California, supposedly of insanity and/or paralysis as a result of syphilis.

== Partial filmography ==
- The Champion (1915)
- A Jitney Elopement (1915)
- The Tramp (1915)
- By the Sea (1915)
- Work (1915)
- The Bank (1915)
- Shanghaied (1915)
- A Night in the Show (1915)
- Police (1916)
- A Broadway Cowboy (1920)
