= The Bank (1915 film) =

1915 film by Charlie Chaplin

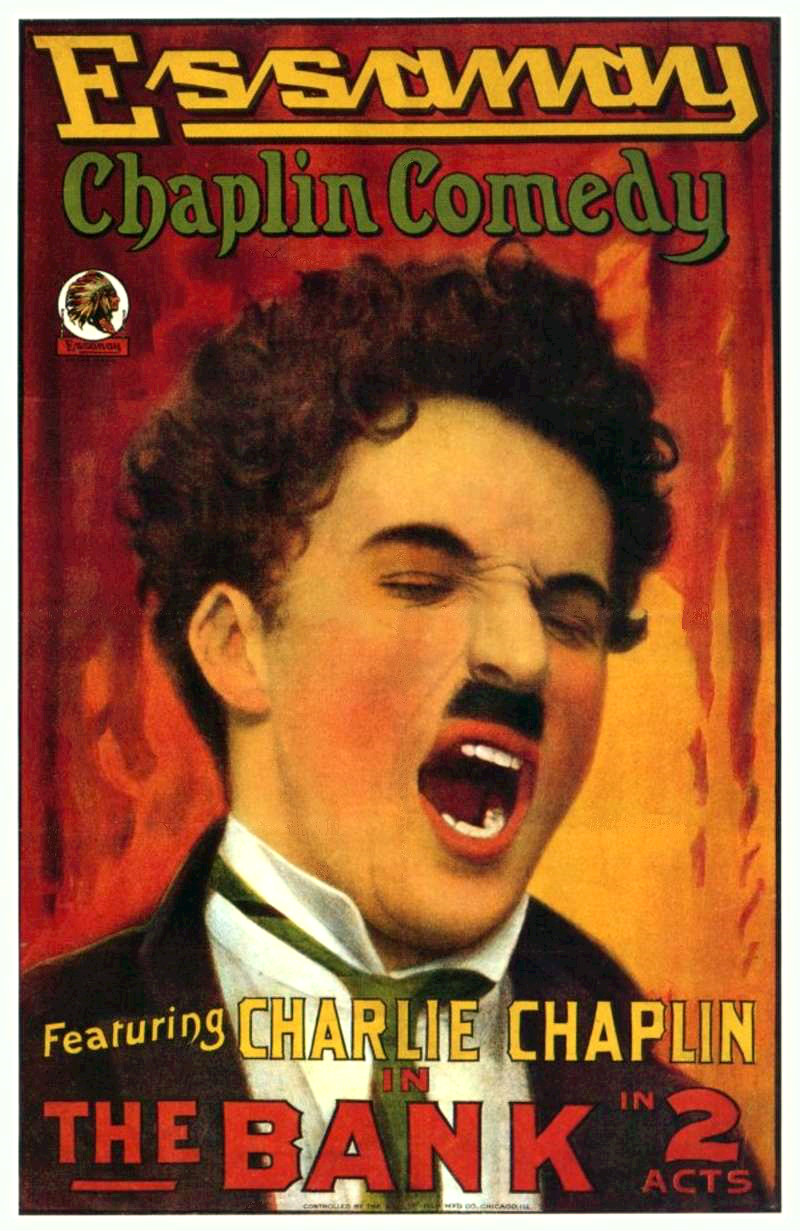
- Theatrical poster to The Bank
- Directed by: Charlie Chaplin
- Written by: Charlie Chaplin
- Produced by: Jess Robbins
- Starring: Charlie Chaplin; Charles Inslee; Carl Stockdale; Edna Purviance; Leo White
- Cinematography: Harry Ensign
- Edited by: Charlie Chaplin
- Music by: Robert Israel (Kino video release)
- Distributed by: Essanay Studios; General Film Company
- Release date: August 9, 1915
- Running time: 33 minutes
- Country: United States
- Languages: Silent film; English (original intertitles)

The Bank is a 1915 silent slapstick comedy film. It was Charlie Chaplin's tenth film for Essanay Films.

It is a departure from the Tramp character, as Charlie Chaplin in this instance, plays a janitor in a bank. Edna Purviance plays the secretary on whom Charlie's character has a crush and dreams that she has fallen in love with him. Filmed at the Majestic Studio in Los Angeles. There is not much to be any evidence that this film was received any differently from the bulk of Chaplin's early work, but today this film is often considered one of his best efforts during his Essanay period.

== Plot ==
The Bank

Charlie, feeling very important, enters the bank where he works. He descends to the vault and works its combination with great panache and opens the door. Charlie hangs his coat inside the vault and brings out his mop and bucket, signifying he is the bank's janitor. He causes typical havoc with his mop and then with his broom. Charlie sweeps one room and the other janitor sweeps the adjacent room. Instead of cleaning, they just sweep the rubbish from room to room, so it becomes the other's task.

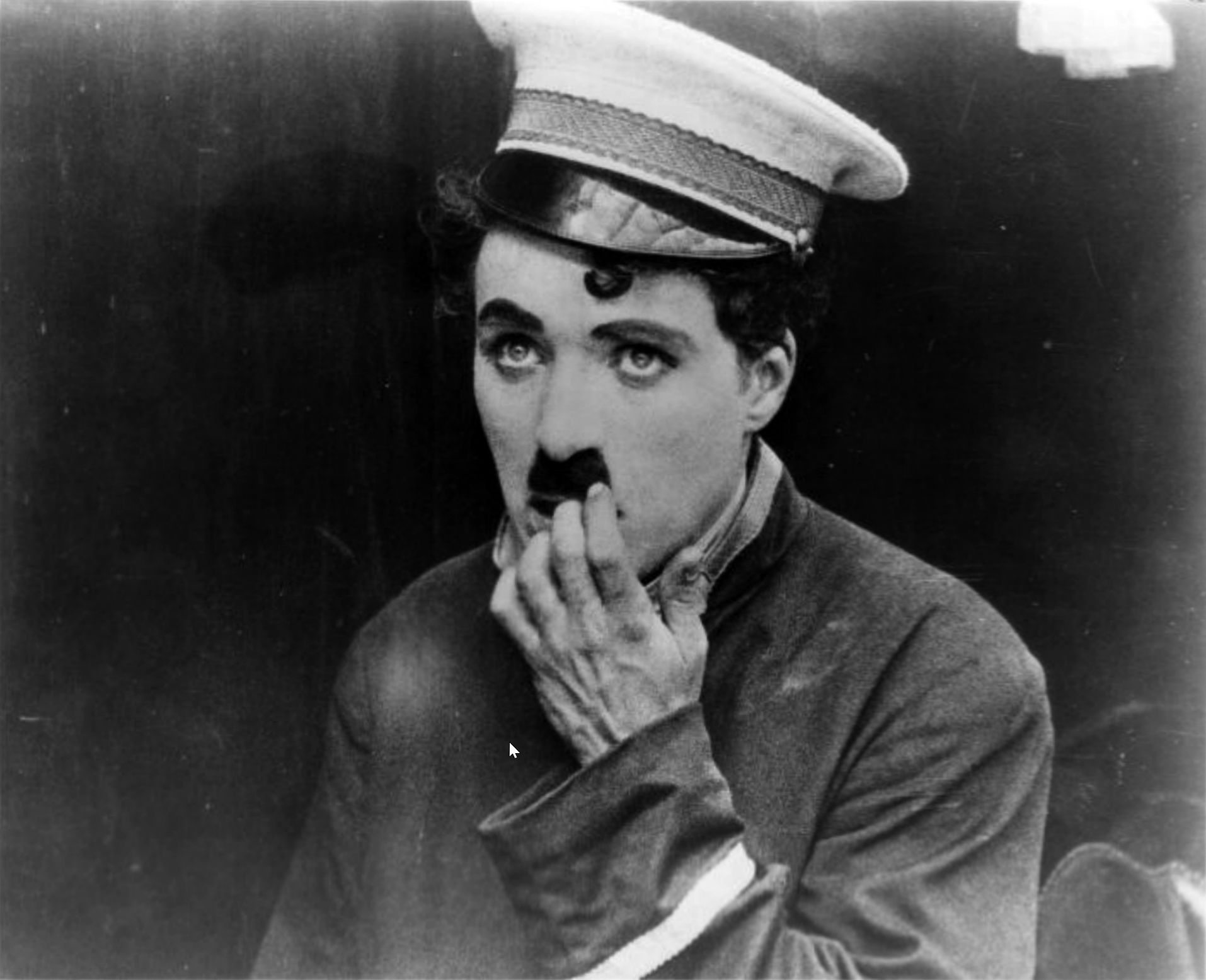
Screenshot from the film

Charlie discovers a package containing a tie with a note attached to it, written by the bank's typist. It is addressed "To Charles with love from Edna." Charlie jumps to the wrong conclusion that Edna is in love with him, not realizing the package is intended for another Charles—the cashier. Charlie gets a bunch of flowers and places them lovingly on Edna's desk with a note "love from Charlie". When Edna is told by Charles the cashier that they are not from him but from Charlie the janitor, she coldly tosses them into the wastebasket. Charlie finds them there and is heartbroken. Charlie then has a dream in which he heroically thwarts a bank robbery, rescuing Edna in the process. He turns to kiss the now-adoring Edna—but then he wakes up. Charlie is kissing his mop—while Edna is kissing her cashier boyfriend.

== Cast ==
- Charlie Chaplin as Charlie, a janitor
- Edna Purviance as Edna, a secretary
- Carl Stockdale as Charles, a cashier
- Charles Inslee as President of the bank
- Leo White as Clerk
- Billy Armstrong as Another janitor
- Fred Goodwins as Bald cashier/Bank robber with derby
- John Rand as Bank robber and salesman
- Lloyd Bacon as Bank robber
- Frank Coleman as Bank robber
- Paddy McGuire as Cashier in white coat
- Wesley Ruggles as Bank customer
- Carrie Clark Ward as Bank customer
- Lawrence A. Bowes as Bond salesman

== Reception ==
In an August 1915 review for Variety, journalist Sime Silverman called it "the most legitimate comedy film Chaplin has played in many a long day, perhaps since he's been in pictures".
