= The Tramp (film) =

1915 film directed by Charlie Chaplin

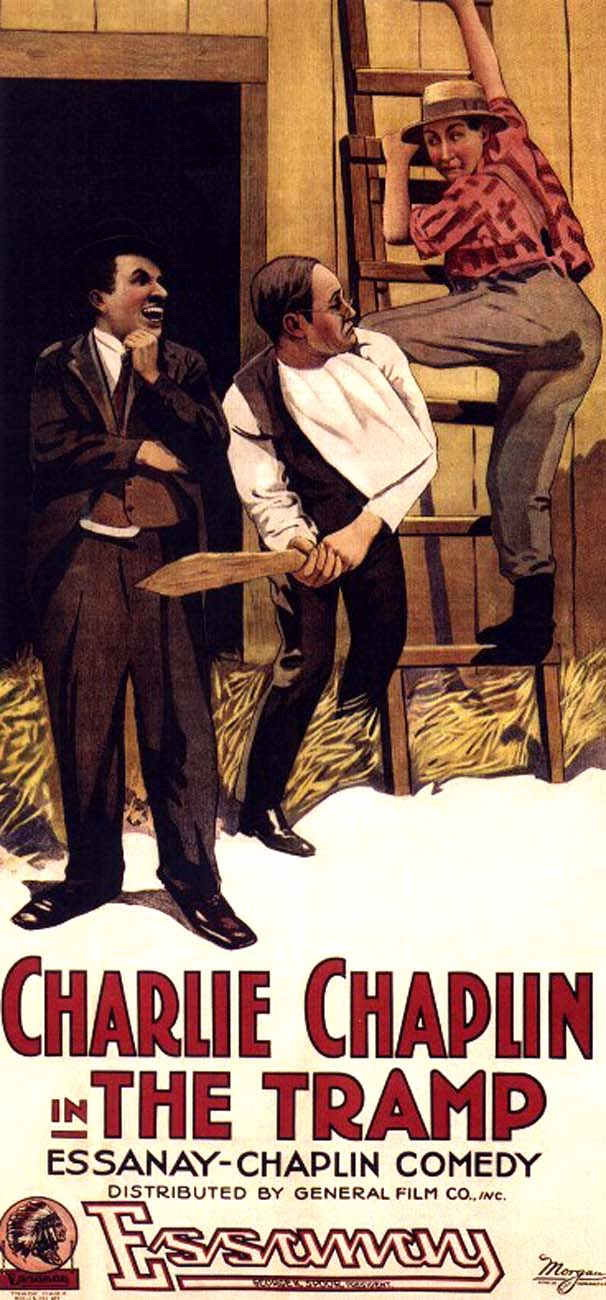
- Theatrical release poster
- Directed by: Charlie Chaplin
- Written by: Charlie Chaplin
- Produced by: Jess Robbins
- Starring: Charlie Chaplin; Edna Purviance
- Cinematography: Harry Ensign
- Edited by: Charlie Chaplin
- Distributed by: Essanay Studios; General Film Company
- Release date: April 11, 1915
- Running time: 26 minutes (2-reels)
- Country: United States
- Language: Silent (English intertitles)

The Tramp is a 1915 film directed and written by Charlie Chaplin, who plays the titular character. It was Chaplin's sixth film, produced by Essanay Studios and his fifth shot in and around their studio in Niles, California. The character of The Tramp had appeared in Chaplin's previous films, but with this film he is given more emotional depth. The film also stars Ernest Van Pelt and Edna Purviance as a farmer and his daughter.

== Plot ==
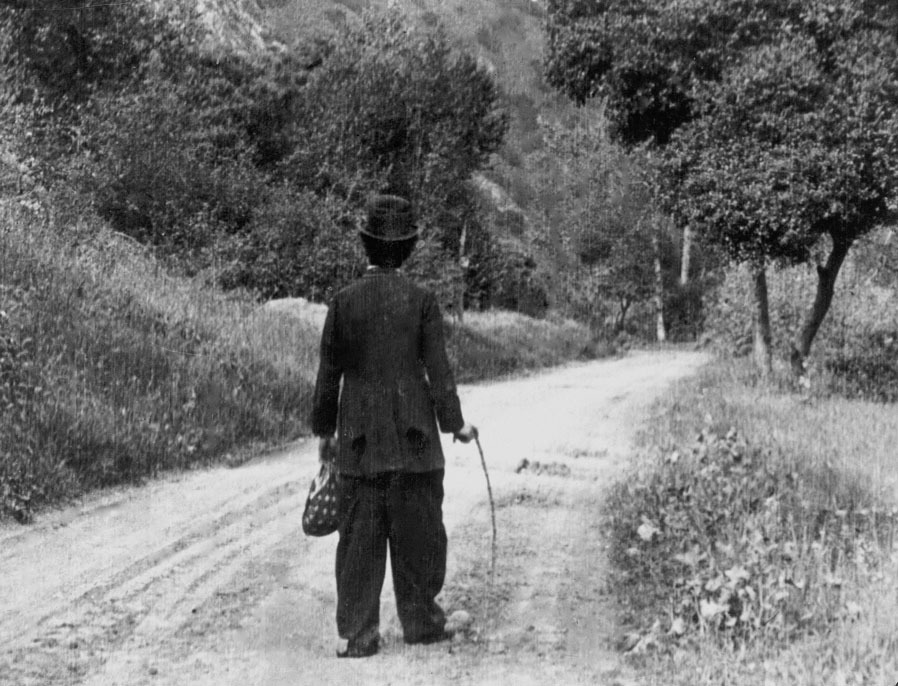
The poignant last scene in The Tramp was filmed in Niles Canyon.

The Tramp is walking down the road, narrowly escaping two cars. Seeking refuge on a farm, he faces various humorous situations, including a hobo trading his sandwich for a brick. The Tramp comes to the aid of a farmer's daughter who is harassed by a hobo. As the story unfolds, the Tramp engages in farm work, gets involved in a tiff with a farmhand, and foils a planned robbery. However, upon realizing the farmer's daughter is already in a relationship, the Tramp decides to leave, leaving a heartfelt letter behind and the Tramp walks away alone on the road he came in.

== Cast ==
Full film

- Charlie Chaplin as The Tramp
- Edna Purviance as Farmer's daughter
- Lloyd Bacon as Edna's fiancé/Second thief
- Leo White as First thief
- Bud Jamison as Third thief
- Ernest Van Pelt as Farmer, Edna's father
- Paddy McGuire as Farmhand
- Billy Armstrong as Minister

== Reception ==
The Tramp faced cuts by city and state film censorship boards, including a scene of Chaplin sitting in a sewage drainage pipe after burning his posterior, cut by the Chicago Board of Censors.
