= A Jitney Elopement =

1915 film by Charlie Chaplin

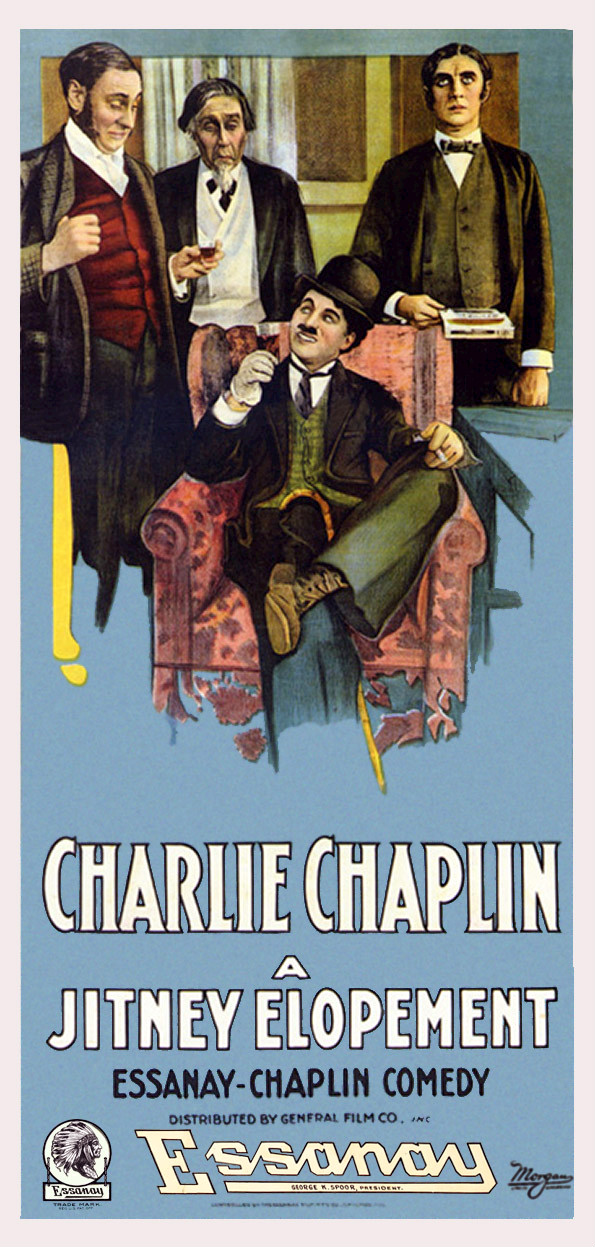
- Theatrical poster to A Jitney Elopement
- Directed by: Charlie Chaplin
- Written by: Charlie Chaplin
- Produced by: Jess Robbins
- Starring: Charlie Chaplin; Lloyd Bacon; Ernest Van Pelt; Edna Purviance; Leo White
- Cinematography: Harry Ensign
- Edited by: Charlie Chaplin
- Music by: Robert Israel (Kino video release)
- Distributed by: Essanay Studios; General Film Company
- Release date: April 1, 1915
- Running time: 33 minutes
- Country: United States
- Languages: Silent; English (original intertitles)

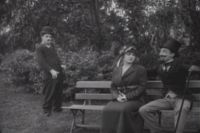
A scene filmed in Golden Gate Park

Full film

A Jitney Elopement is a 1915 film and Charlie Chaplin's fifth film for Essanay Films. It starred Chaplin and Edna Purviance as lovers, with Purviance wanting Chaplin to take her away from an arranged marriage her father (played by Fred Goodwins) had planned for her. Chaplin does take her away, and they are pursued by a jitney, a type of share taxi popular in the US between 1914 and 1916. Most of the film was made in San Francisco and includes scenes of San Francisco's Golden Gate Park and the large windmills still on the park's west side.

== Plot ==
Edna's father greedily wants her to marry wealthy Count Chloride de Lime whom neither she nor he has ever met. Unknown to Edna's father, his daughter already has a true love: Charlie. Edna drops a note to her Charlie explaining her plight and asking him be her knight and save her. Charlie agrees. He arrives at Edna's home and impersonates the Count at dinner. Charlie humorously consumes beans with a knife, but still manages to keep up the facade of being a count. However, the true Count de Lime arrives and Charlie is roughly escorted away as an impostor. The count takes Edna to a nearby park to woo her, but Charlie is close by, as is Edna's father. Charlie interrupts the Count's romantic plans and begins a fight with the Count, Edna's father and three park policemen.

An automobile chase featuring Edna and Charlie in one car (a two-seater roadster) and the pursuers in another (a four-seater) (Note: Charlie and Edna escape in the Count's Hupmobile Model 20. Their pursuers hijack a Ford Model T, whose driver is sleeping. In the early years of the 20th century, many Model T owners in the US and Canada used their vehicles to provide a regulated or unregulated share taxi or illegal taxi operation. As a result, the Model T was often colloquially known at that time as a "jitney" when used as a cab or taxi.) ends with a few timely and accurate brick tosses by Charlie and the pursuing vehicle being bumped off a pier. The movie ends with Edna and Charlie shyly kissing in their vehicle.

== Cast ==
- Charlie Chaplin as Suitor, the Fake Count
- Edna Purviance as Edna/Edena/Iona Lott
- Ernest Van Pelt as Edna's father
- Leo White as Count Chloride de Lime, Edna's Suitor
- Lloyd Bacon as Young Butler/Cop (uncredited)
- Paddy McGuire as Old Butler/Cop
- Bud Jamison as Cop with Baton
- Carl Stockdale as Cop
- Fred Goodwins as Car owner

== Reception ==
A reviewer for Motion Picture World wrote, "There is a vein of romance throughout the story which, combined with Chaplin's inimitable comedy, gives the picture a general appeal."

== Discrepancy ==
Edna's name is given as Edna in an early title card and Edena mid-way. When she throws a note out of her window to Charlie, it is signed Iona Lott (I own a lot).
