= George Cleethorpe =

American actor (1883–1961)

George James Cleethorpe (17 December 1883 – 25 August 1961) was an Irish or Scottish-born American silent film actor.

George James Cleethorpe was born on 17 December 1883 in Scotland, or possibly Ireland.

Cleethorpe acted with Charlie Chaplin at Essanay Studios in Los Angeles from 1915, and continued with him at Mutual. In 1918, he worked for Broncho Billy Anderson’s Golden West, and in 1921 was an assistant director at Jess Robbins.

Cleethorpe's wife Marie Constance Cleethorpe (born 1880) died in 1932 at the age of 52. He died on 25 August 1961 at the age of 77.

== Partial filmography ==
- Police (1916)
