= A Night Out (1915 film) =

1915 film

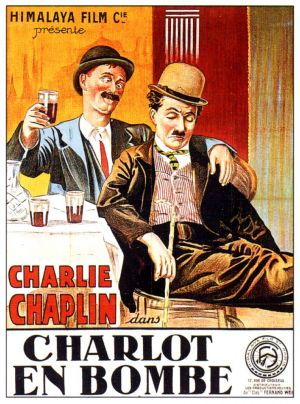
- French theatrical poster to A Night Out
- Directed by: Charlie Chaplin
- Written by: Charlie Chaplin
- Produced by: Jess Robbins
- Starring: Charlie Chaplin; Ben Turpin; Bud Jamison; Edna Purviance; Leo White
- Cinematography: Harry Ensign
- Edited by: Charlie Chaplin
- Production company: Essanay Studios
- Distributed by: General Film Company
- Release date: February 15, 1915
- Running time: 33 minutes
- Country: United States
- Languages: Silent film English (original intertitles)

A Night Out is a 1915 Charlie Chaplin comedy short. It was Chaplin's first film with Edna Purviance, who would continue as his leading lady for the following eight years. It was also Chaplin's first film with Essanay Film Company in Niles, California. Chaplin's first Essanay film, His New Job, was made in the Chicago studio, after which he moved to Niles Studios. He found Purviance in San Francisco when he was searching for a leading lady for his films. A Night Out also stars Ben Turpin, Leo White and Bud Jamison.

== Plot ==
Charlie and Ben get wildly intoxicated at a hotel and drop a pie on a Dandy and a giant, which results in the both of them being throttled and tossed out of the building. They escape up to their rooms where in the hallway, they encounter a woman in her pajamas with her dog. The poodle chases Charlie and he hides in the bathroom and the woman rushes after it, closing the door when she sees her husband outside. Her husband eventually leaves for the downstairs, where Charlie takes the opportunity to escort the lady and her dog back to their room, at this moment her husband returns. Charlie dives under the bed covers as he enters, where the husband promptly sits upon him as he takes off his shoes. Dragged out from under blanket, Charlie is shot at and he jumps out the window and lands in the leaves below. Ben hears the gunshot and panics in the hallway and accidentally hits Charlie, and they drunkenly swing at each other until Charlie falls into the full bathtub.

== Cast ==
- Charlie Chaplin - Reveller
- Ben Turpin - Fellow Reveller
- Bud Jamison - Headwaiter
- Edna Purviance - Headwaiter's Wife
- Leo White - 'French' Dandy/Desk clerk
- Fred Goodwins - Old clerk at the hotel

== Production ==
A Night Out

Some exterior scenes take place in front of still-existing buildings in Oakland, such as the Peralta Apartments on 13th Street, the Sierra Apartments on Alice Street, and the Hotel Oakland on Harrison Street.
