= The Champion (1915 film) =

1915 film by Charlie Chaplin

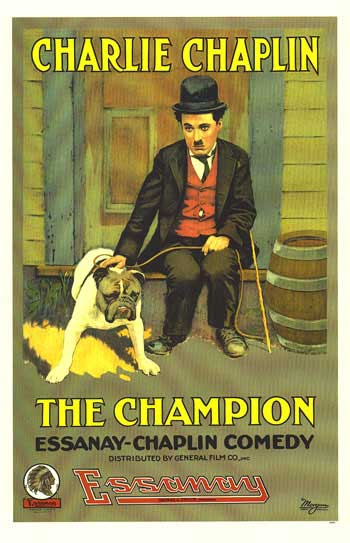
- Theatrical poster of The Champion (1915)
- Directed by: Charlie Chaplin
- Written by: Charlie Chaplin
- Produced by: Jess Robbins
- Starring: Charlie Chaplin; Edna Purviance; Ernest Van Pelt; Robert Shields; Lloyd Bacon; Leo White; Carl Stockdale; Billy Armstrong; Paddy McGuire; Bud Jamison; Ben Turpin
- Cinematography: Harry Ensign
- Edited by: Charlie Chaplin
- Music by: Robert Israel (Kino video release)
- Distributed by: Essanay Studios; General Film Company
- Release date: March 11, 1915
- Running time: 33 minutes (2-reels)
- Country: United States
- Languages: Silent; English (original intertitles)

The Champion is a 1915 American 2-reel silent comedy short film released by Essanay Studios, starring Charlie Chaplin alongside Edna Purviance and Leo White. Essanay co-owner and star, Broncho Billy Anderson can be seen as an enthusiastic audience member in the boxing match scene.

== Plot ==
The Champion

In this comedy, Charlie Chaplin has a companion—a pet bulldog. Walking along a street with his bulldog, Charlie finds a "good luck" horseshoe just as he passes the training camp of an enormous fighter named Spike Dugan. Outside the camp is a large, painted advertisement which states Dugan is seeking sparring partners "who can take a punch." After watching other better fighters be soundly beaten by Dugan, Charlie decides his best bet is to put the horseshoe inside his boxing glove. Using the loaded glove, Charlie connects with a solid punch and wins. The trainer prepares Charlie to fight the world champion. A gambler wants Charlie to throw the fight. He and the trainer's daughter fall in love.

== Cast ==
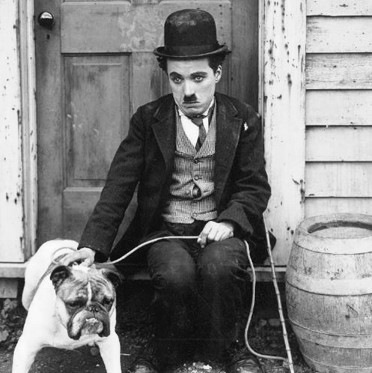
Charlie Chaplin in The Champion (1915)

- Charlie Chaplin as Challenger
- Edna Purviance as Trainer's daughter
- Ernest Van Pelt as Spike Dugan
- Lloyd Bacon as Second sparring partner/Referee
- Leo White as Crooked gambler
- Carl Stockdale as Sparring partner
- Billy Armstrong as Sparring partner
- Paddy McGuire as Sparring partner
- Bud Jamison as Bob Uppercut, Champion
- Ben Turpin as Ringside vendor

== Production ==
The Champion was filmed entirely on location in downtown Niles, California, at the corner of G Street and Niles Boulevard, around the Essanay Studio, as the second of five films Chaplin made for Essanay in the San Francisco Bay Area before returning to Los Angeles to finish out his one-year contract with Essanay.

The roots of The Champion go back to a Fred Karno troupe music hall sketch "The Football Match", in particular, the scene in which Leo White attempts to bribe the Tramp to throw the boxing match and the climatic fight evokes a Fred Karno troupe favourite, The Yap Yaps, as well as the Chaplin-Arbuckle Keystone short The Knockout.

== Notes ==
In some versions of the film, an inter-title introducing the heavyweight boxers refers to Spike Dugan as "Spike Hennessey"—although the surname Dugan is clearly painted on the wall surrounding his training camp.

This was the second Chaplin film to focus on boxing. He had already made a comedy for Keystone Studios, titled The Knockout (1914), in which he was a secondary character—a boxing referee. In City Lights (1931) he would again play an outsized and outclassed pugilist.

== See also ==
- List of boxing films
