= By the Sea (1915 film) =

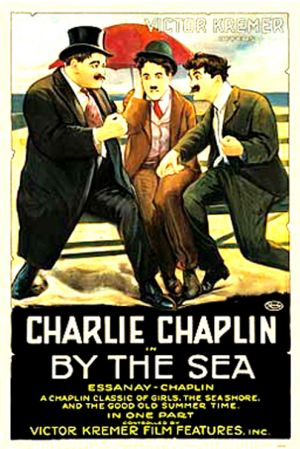
- Theatrical release poster to By the Sea
- Directed by: Charlie Chaplin
- Written by: Charlie Chaplin
- Produced by: Jess Robbins
- Starring: Charlie Chaplin; Billy Armstrong; Margie Reiger; Bud Jamison; Edna Purviance; Paddy McGuire
- Cinematography: Harry Ensign
- Edited by: Charlie Chaplin
- Distributed by: General Film Company
- Release date: April 29, 1915
- Running time: 20 minutes
- Country: United States
- Language: Silent (English intertitles)

By the Sea is a 1915 American silent comedy short film Charlie Chaplin made while waiting for a studio to work in Los Angeles. He had just left Niles Essanay Studio after doing five films at that location. By the Sea was filmed all on location in Santa Monica on the beach near Ocean Park Pier and on Crystal Pier in April 1915. The story centers on Charlie's Little Tramp character and how he gets into trouble trying to grab the attention of women on the beach. Edna Purviance plays one of the wives in whom he shows interest. It is said to be the first film to incorporate the classic gag of a man slipping on a banana skin.

== Plot ==
By the Sea

A drunk is being told to stay where he is by his wife. The Tramp enters eating a banana while wandering along the seashore on the Crystal Pier. He nonchalantly throws the banana peel away and quickly slips on it.

Shortly thereafter the Tramp encounters the aforementioned drunk. A heavy wind blows off their hats and results in confusion as to whose hat is whose. the Tramp mixes up the drunk's white hat with his own bowler hat, and they fight and kick over the issue. They run to the beach, where they collide with each other, and the drunk seems to have won the fight when he grabs the Tramp by the neck.

However, the Tramp makes a clever comeback by kicking the drunk over. Another fight ensues, where the Tramp tears up his adversary's hat and another battle ensues. The Tramp makes a hasty escape to a nearby pole holding a lifebelt, where he challenges the drunk. The man's drunkenness gets the better of him, and he barely manages to stand.

After a mini-fight, the Tramp knocks him out. To appear less conspicuous, he pretends the man is his friend, ruffling up his hair and grinning at the passers-by, all the while punching him discreetly.

Just then, the wife of a dandy passes the Tramp and the drunk. She sees what the Tramp has done to him. the Tramp plays along, soon forgetting about the woman's husband and sitting on him multiple times. However, the knocked-out man could not take the Tramp's weight, and eventually, gave way, making the Tramp fall down and raising a few chuckles from the woman and a six-foot dandy.

The drunk recovers, and when he realising what the Tramp had done to him, is understandably furious. The fight is on the brink of escalation when a policeman comes. However, in spite of his presence, the fight escalates, and a poorly-aimed punch by the drunk hits the policeman in the face, knocking him out.

Soon, they become weary of fighting and decide to be pals. They agree to have ice cream cones together. However, an argument ensues over which man will pay for them. Their battle restarts. They smear the ice cream over each other's face, and that soon blows over to a full-fledged fight again.

The dandy keeps chuckling and goes over closer to see the fight in detail. However, that, he soon realizes, was a false move, because the drunk, originally intending to throw his ice-cream (well, what was left of it, anyway!) at the Tramp, aims poorly, and thus, throws his cone over the six-foot dandy.

A second battle begins but the Tramp slips away and starts flirting with the dandy's wife. The dandy recognizes the Tramp when he comes back, however, and, his blood boiling, sits down on the bench. The Tramp hurriedly scuttles away - towards his drunk adversary, where he was fighting the policeman. However, the drunk recognizes him, and runs after him.

The Tramp sits himself on a bench on the beach where the drunk's wife from the first scene is waiting. He is soon surrounded by his enemies: the drunk who wants to continue the fight, the angry dandy, and the dandy's wife. Thinking fast, the Tramp cleverly tips the bench backwards, toppling everyone and allowing himself to hastily escape.

== Cast ==
- Charlie Chaplin as the tramp
- Billy Armstrong as the man in straw hat
- Margie Reiger as Man in straw hat's wife
- Bud Jamison as Man in top hat
- Edna Purviance as Man in top hat's sweetheart
- Paddy McGuire as First cop
- Ernest Van Pelt as Second cop

== Location ==
The movie was the first of Chaplin's Essanay films to be shot in southern California. At Chaplin's insistence, all his remaining Essanay films were made there in the rented Majestic Studios. Chaplin had found the facilities at the Essanay Studios in Niles, California to be unsatisfactory.

Palisades Park opposite Arizona Avenue in Santa Monica (Chaplin flirts with the woman sitting on the bench).

== Music ==
In 2013, the Dallas Chamber Symphony commissioned an original film score for By The Sea from composer Penka Kouneva. The score premiered on November 19, 2013 at Moody Performance Hall with Richard McKay conducting.

== Review ==
A reviewer from the British film periodical Bioscope wrote, "More irresistible absurdities by the inimitable Charles, with the broad Pacific Ocean as a background. Chaplin's humor needs neither description nor recommendation."
