= Work (film) =

1915 film by Charlie Chaplin

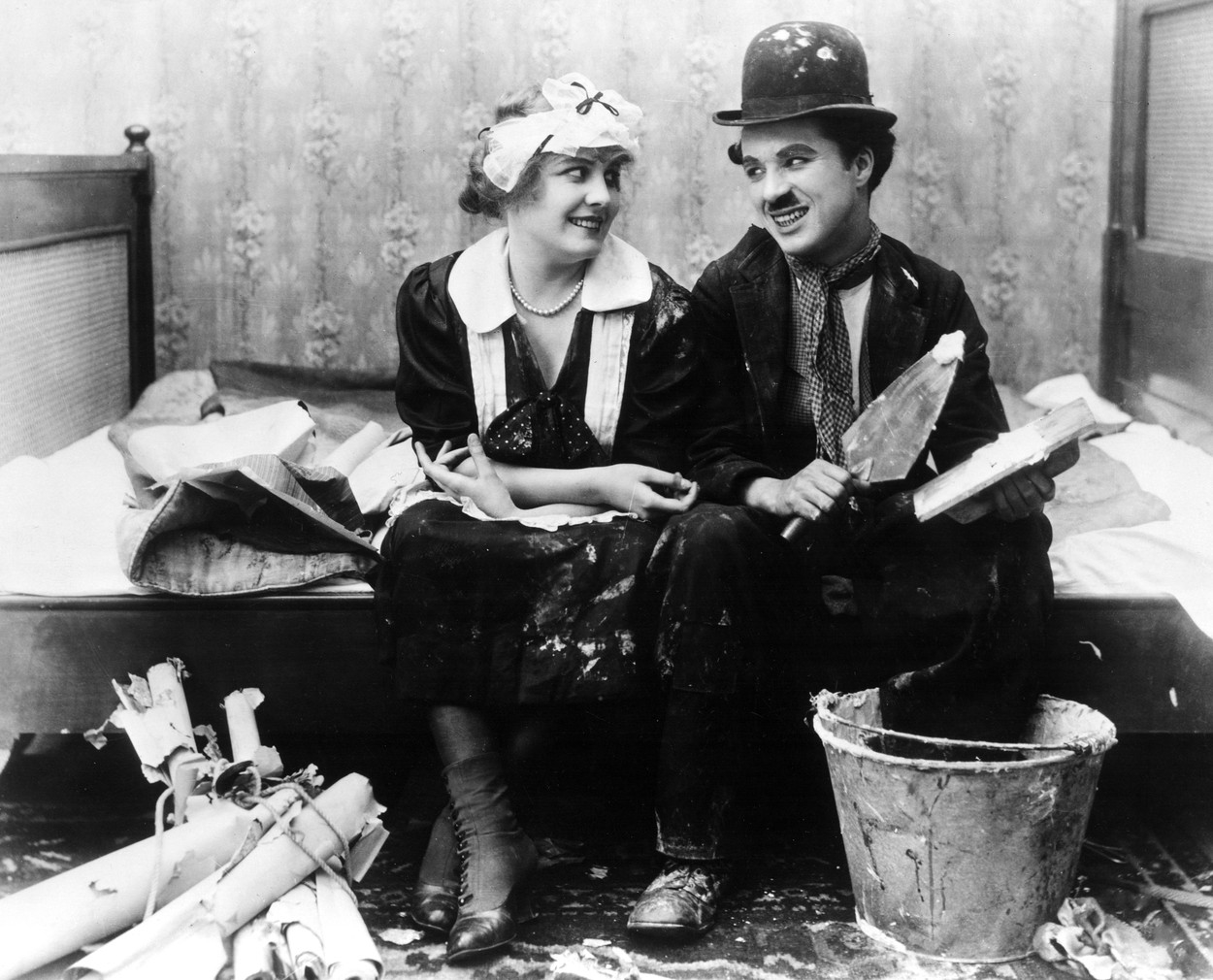
- Still of Charlie Chaplin and Edna Purviance for the film.
- Directed by: Charlie Chaplin
- Written by: Charlie Chaplin
- Produced by: Jess Robbins
- Starring: Charlie Chaplin; Charles Inslee; Billy Armstrong; Edna Purviance; Leo White
- Cinematography: Harry Ensign
- Edited by: Charlie Chaplin
- Music by: Robert Israel (Kino video release)
- Distributed by: Essanay Studios; General Film Company
- Release date: June 21, 1915
- Running time: 33 minutes
- Country: United States
- Languages: Silent; English (original intertitles)

Work is a 1915 American silent film starring Charlie Chaplin (his eighth film for Essanay Films), and co-starring Edna Purviance, Marta Golden and Charles Inslee. It was filmed at the Majestic Studio in Los Angeles.

It is one of the first movies to appreciate the slapstick potential of a painting and decorating scenario.

== Plot ==
Work

Charlie is an assistant to Izzy A. Wake, a painter and wallpaper hanger. The two men are on their way to a job carrying their ladders and materials on a cart. The boss rides in the cart, leisurely sitting in front of all their paraphernalia, while Charlie is hitched to the cart like a mule. The boss also treats Charlie like a mule, beating him with a stick to get him to move faster.

When the boss opts to take a shortcut up a steep hill, the out-of-control cart descends and is nearly hit by an oncoming streetcar. A second attempt to scale the enormous hill is successful. A further delay is caused by Charlie falling down a manhole. At the destination house, Charlie carries all the material on the cart into the house in one move. They have been commissioned to hang wallpaper, but Charlie becomes distracted by the pretty maid. The boss has a misadventure and falls, his head ending up in a bucket of paste. Meanwhile, the short-tempered homeowner is contending with the threat of an exploding stove and an amorous French visitor who is making passes at his wife. Shots are fired—and the target turns out to be Charlie who has been enjoying the maid's company. An enraged Charlie gives the Frenchman, his boss, and the homeowner each a face full of paste. As the fight moves into the kitchen, the troublesome stove finally explodes. When the dust dies down, Charlie is nowhere to be seen. Slowly the oven door opens. Charlie looks out and retreats into the stove.

== Cast ==
- Charlie Chaplin ... Izzy A. Wake's Assistant
- Billy Armstrong ... The Husband (uncredited)
- Marta Golden ... The Wife (uncredited)
- Charles Inslee ... Izzy A. Wake - Paperhanger (uncredited)
- Paddy McGuire ... The Plasterbearer (uncredited)
- Edna Purviance ... Maid (uncredited)
- Leo White ... The Secret Lover (uncredited)

== Reception ==
A reviewer from Bioscope praised Work, noting, "The humor is designed to rise in a long crescendo of screams to a climax of roars. Positively, the thing is irresistible."
