= Fred Goodwins =

English actor (1891–1923)

- Born: 26 February 1891; London, England
- Died: 22 August 1923 (aged 33); Hackney Downs, London, England
- Occupations: Actor, film director, screenwriter
- Years active: 1915-1921

Fred Goodwins (26 February 1891 – 22 August 1923) was an English actor, film director and screenwriter of the silent era. He appeared in 24 films between 1915 and 1921. He most notably worked with Charlie Chaplin during Chaplin's Mutual period, and wrote a series of articles detailing the production process of the period which were published in the magazine Red Letter in 1916, and later compiled in a book titled "Charlie Chaplin's Red Letter Days".

== Partial filmography ==
- A Night Out (1915)
- A Night in the Show (1915)
- A Jitney Elopement (1915)
- The Bank (1915)
- Shanghaied (1915)
- Police (1916)
- The Vagabond (1916)
- Down to Earth (1917)
- Amarilly of Clothes-Line Alley (1918)
- Mr. Fix-It (1918)
- For Husbands Only (1918)
- The Testing of Mildred Vane (1918)
- Mrs. Leffingwell's Boots (1918)
- The Way of a Man with a Maid (1918)
- Hitting the High Spots (1918)
- Common Clay (1919)
- The Artistic Temperament (1919)
- Forbidden (1919)
- Build Thy House (1920)
- The Department Store (1920)
- The Ever-open Door (1920)
- The Scarlet Kiss (1920)
- Colonel Newcome (1920)
- Blood Money (1921)
- Her Winning Way (1921)
