= Edna Purviance =

American actress (1895–1958)

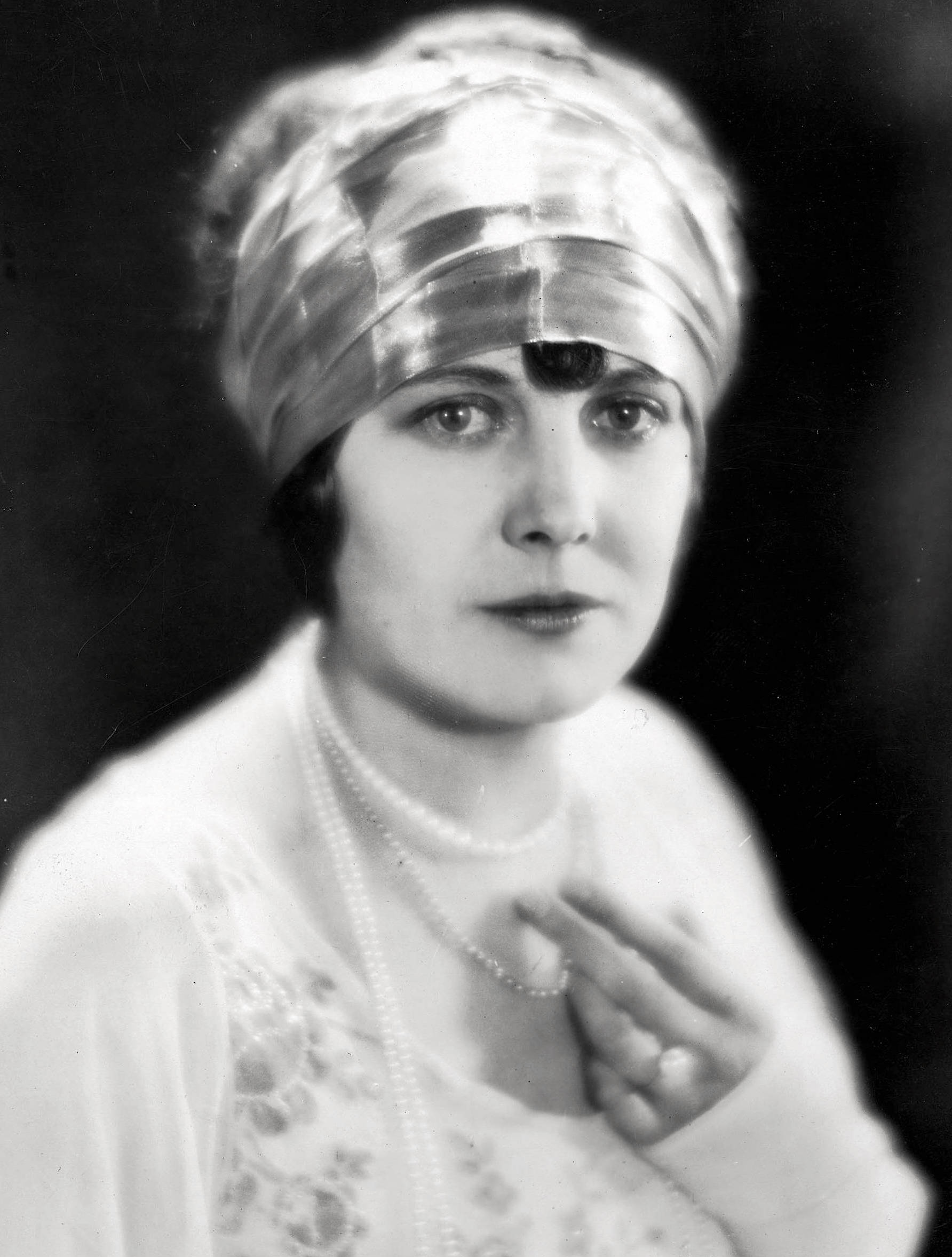
- Purviance in 1923
- Born: Olga Edna Purviance; October 21, 1895; Paradise Valley, Nevada, U.S.
- Died: January 13, 1958 (aged 62); Los Angeles, California, U.S.
- Resting place: Grand View Memorial Park Cemetery
- Occupation: Actress
- Years active: 1915–1927
- Spouse: John Squire (m. 1938; died 1945)

Olga (Note: May need more citations) Edna Purviance (/pɜːrˈvaɪ.ns/; October 21, 1895 – January 13, 1958) was an American actress of the silent film era. She was the leading lady in many of Charlie Chaplin's early films and in a span of eight years, she appeared in over 30 films with him.

== Life and career ==
=== 1895–1913: Early life ===
Edna Purviance was born on October 21, 1895, in Paradise Valley, Nevada, to English immigrant Louisa Wright Davey and American vintner to the western mining camps Madison (Matt) Gates Purviance. When she was three, the family moved to Lovelock, Nevada, where they assumed ownership of the Singer Hotel. Her parents divorced in 1902, and her mother later married Robert Nurnberger, a German plumber. Growing up, Purviance was a talented pianist.

She left Lovelock in 1913 and moved in with her married sister Bessie while attending business college in San Francisco.

=== 1914–1927: Film career ===
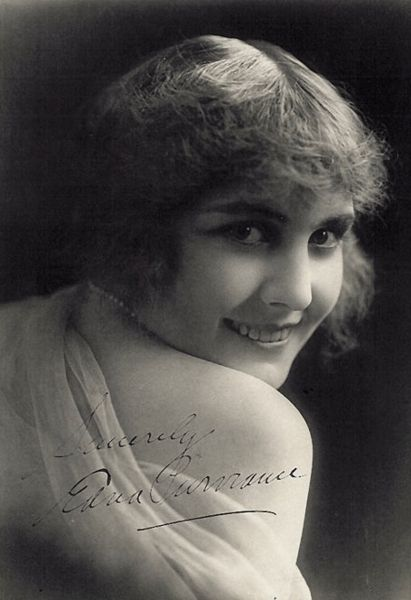
Purviance in Photoplay magazine, 1915

In 1915, Purviance was working as a stenographer in San Francisco when actor and director Charlie Chaplin was working on his second film with Essanay Studios, working out of Niles, California, 28 miles (45 km) southeast of San Francisco, in Southern Alameda County. He was looking for a leading lady for A Night Out.

"A Chaplin talent scout recognized potential in a pretty stenographer named Edna Purviance ... spotted sipping coffee at Tate's Café on Hill Street in Noe Valley."

"... There she met Carl Strauss, in town scouting for a leading lady for the young Charlie Chaplin."

Chaplin arranged a meeting with her, but he was concerned that she might be too serious for comedic roles. Purviance still won the role.

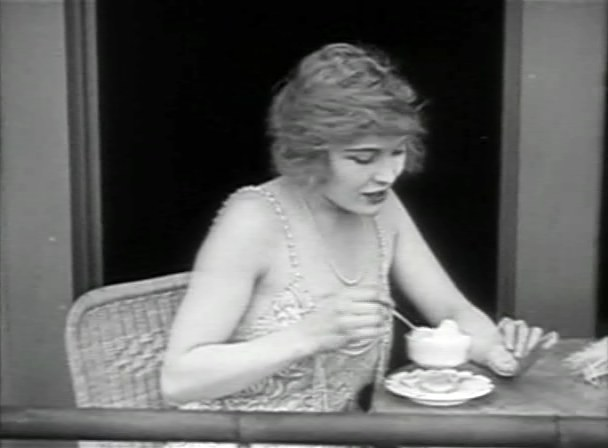
Purviance in The Adventurer (1917)

Edna Purviance was so closely associated with Chaplin on screen that trade reviewers took exception when she was away. Columnist Julian Johnson, reporting on Chaplin's solo performance in One A.M., wrote: "Congratulations, Mr. Chaplin, on speaking your piece so nicely, but—come on back, Edna!" The noticeably close relationship extended to the actors' private lives: Chaplin and Purviance were romantically involved during the making of his Essanay, Mutual, and First National films of 1915 to 1917. The romance ended suddenly when Purviance read a newspaper report of Chaplin having married 16-year-old Mildred Harris.

Purviance appeared in 33 of Chaplin's productions, including the 1921 The Kid. Her last credited appearance in a Chaplin film, A Woman of Paris, was also her first leading role. The film was not a success and effectively ended Purviance's career. She appeared in two more films: Sea Gulls, also known as A Woman of the Sea (which Chaplin never released) and Éducation de Prince, a French film released in 1927.

Purviance was peripherally involved in a scandal. She and Mabel Normand were guests of millionaire oil broker Courtland Stark Dines (1889-1945) on New Year’s Day 1924. Mabel’s chauffeur, R. C. Greer, alias Joe Kelly, got into an argument with Dines, produced a revolver and shot him, not fatally. As a result some cities banned A Woman of Paris.

=== 1927–1958: Retirement and later years ===
For more than 30 years afterward, Edna Purviance lived quietly outside Hollywood. Purviance married John Squire, a Pan-American Airlines pilot, in 1938. They remained married until his death in 1945.

Chaplin kept Purviance on his payroll. She received a monthly salary from Chaplin's film company until she got married, and the payments resumed after her husband's death. She later played bit roles in Chaplin's last two American movies, Monsieur Verdoux and Limelight.

“How could I forget Edna?” Chaplin responded to an interviewer after her death. "She was with me when it all began."

In her posthumously published memoir, actress Georgia Hale, who played opposite Chaplin in The Gold Rush (1925), reported that Chaplin always spoke affectionately of Purviance. Hale relates Chaplin’s account of an incident during the silent film era, when Chaplin and Purviance—he in “an old sweatshirt” and she in “a cotton house dress”—stopped at the exclusive Riverside Inn “looking like hoboes.” The head waiter, alarmed at the couple's appearance, ushered them to the back of the restaurant:

He seated [Edna and myself] behind a large pillar. While we were scanning the menu, some of the customers recognized us. The word spread like wildfire. Back rushed the [head] waiter, waving us to a nice table by the window, where we’d be visible to all his guests. But Edna remained seated and motioned to me to be seated ... [the headwaiter] said “I’m so sorry, I thought you were just common people.” Edna looked at him and said sweetly, “We want to thank you for treating us like humble people. You have just paid us the highest compliment. That will be all. Please send us the waiter.”

== Death ==
On January 13, 1958, Purviance died from throat cancer at the Motion Picture & Television Country House and Hospital in Woodland Hills, California, aged 62. Her remains are interred at Grand View Memorial Park Cemetery in Glendale, California.

== In popular culture ==
She was portrayed by Penelope Ann Miller in the film Chaplin (1992) and by Katie Maguire in the film Madcap Mabel (2010).

== Filmography ==
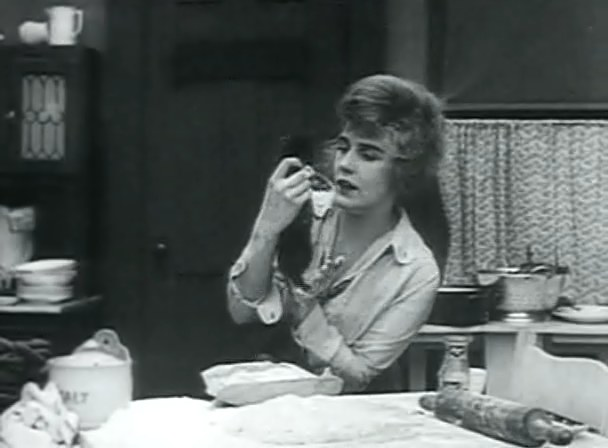
Purviance in The Pawnshop (1916)

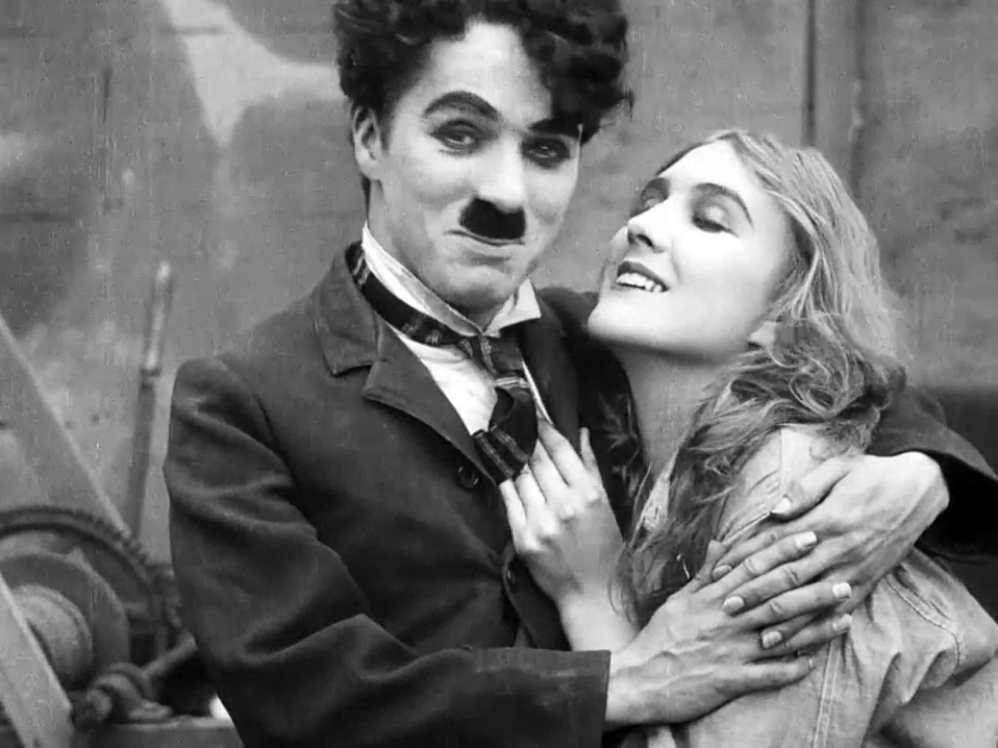
Charlie Chaplin and Purviance in Behind the Screen (1916)

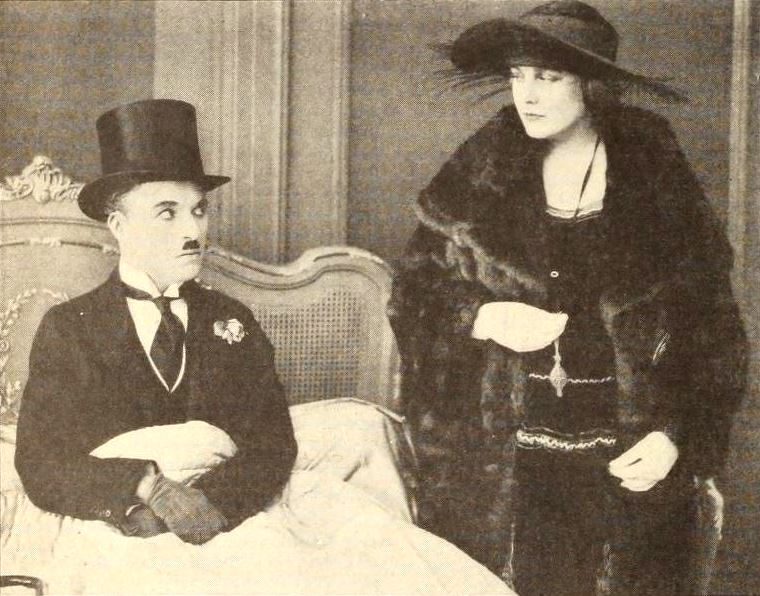
Chaplin and Purviance in The Idle Class (1921)

=== Short subjects ===
All short subjects directed by Charlie Chaplin.

Year	Title	Role	Notes	Ref.
1915	A Night Out	The Headwaiter's Wife		
1915	The Champion	Trainer's Daughter		
1915	In the Park	Nursemaid		
1915	A Jitney Elopement	Edna		
1915	The Tramp	Farmer's Daughter		
1915	By the Sea	Man in Top Hat's Sweetheart		
1915	Work	Maid		
1915	A Woman	Daughter of the House		
1915	The Bank	Edna, a Secretary		
1915	Shanghaied	Daughter of the Shipowner		
1915	A Night in the Show	Lady in the Stalls with Beads		
1915	Burlesque on Carmen	Carmen		
1916	Police	Daughter of the House		
1916	The Floorwalker	Manager's secretary		
1916	The Fireman	The Chief's Sweetheart		
1916	The Vagabond	Girl Stolen by Gypsies		
1916	The Count	Miss Moneybags		
1916	The Pawnshop	Daughter		
1916	Behind the Screen	The Girl		
1916	The Rink	The Girl		
1917	Easy Street	The Mission Worker		
1917	The Cure	The Girl		
1917	The Immigrant	Immigrant		
1917	The Adventurer	The Girl		
1918	A Dog's Life	Bar Singer		
1918	Triple Trouble	Maid		
1918	The Bond	Charlie's Wife		
1918	Shoulder Arms	French Girl		
1919	Sunnyside	Village Belle		
1919	A Day's Pleasure	Mother		
1921	The Idle Class	Neglected Wife		
1922	Pay Day	Foreman's Daughter		
1923	The Pilgrim	Miss Brown		

=== Feature films ===
Year	Title	Role	Director(s)	Notes	Ref.
1921	The Kid	Mother	Charlie Chaplin		
1923	A Woman of Paris	Marie St. Clair	Charlie Chaplin		
1926	A Woman of the Sea	Joan	Josef von Sternberg	not released; destroyed lost film	
1927	Éducation de Prince	The Queen	Henri Diamant-Berger		
1947	Monsieur Verdoux	Garden Party Guest	Charlie Chaplin	uncredited	
1952	Limelight	Mrs. Parker	Charlie Chaplin	uncredited	

== Sources ==
- Eyman, Scott 2023. Charlie Chaplin vs. America: When Art, Sex and Politics Collided. Simon & Schuster, New York. ISBN 978-1-9821-7635-8
- Hale, Georgia 1995. Charlie Chaplin: Intimate Close-ups. The Scarecrow Press, Lanham, Maryland. Heather Kiernan, editor. ISBN 1-57886-004-0
- Jacobs, Lewis. 1967. The Rise of the American Film: Experimental Cinema in America, 1921-1947. Teachers College Press, Teacher’s College, Columbia University, New York. Library of Congress Catalog Number: 68-25845
- Kiernan, Heather. 1999. Introduction to Charlie Chaplin: Intimate Close-ups. The Scarecrow Press, Lanham, Maryland. Heather Kiernan, editor. ISBN 1-57886-004-0
- Neibaur, James L. (2012). Early Charlie Chaplin: The Artist as Apprentice at Keystone Studios. Lanham, Maryland: Scarecrow Press. ISBN 978-0-810-88242-3.
- Powrie, Phil (2005). Pierre Batcheff and Stardom in 1920s French Cinema. Edinburgh, Schotland: Edinburgh University Press. ISBN 978-0-748-62960-2.
