= The Count (film) =

1916 short film by Charlie Chaplin

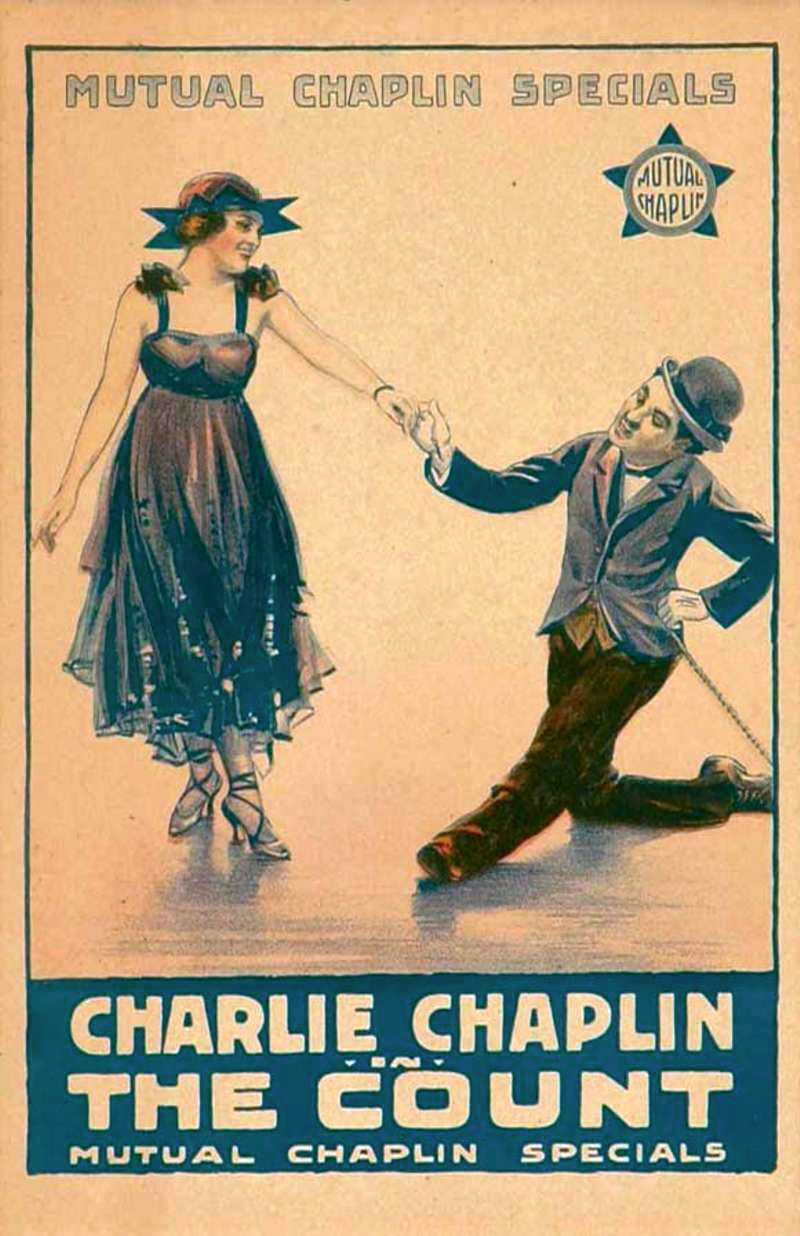
- Theatrical release poster
- Directed by: Charlie Chaplin; Edward Brewer (technical director)
- Written by: Charlie Chaplin (scenario); Vincent Bryan (scenario); Maverick Terrell (scenario)
- Produced by: Henry P. Caulfield
- Starring: Charlie Chaplin; Edna Purviance; Eric Campbell
- Cinematography: Roland Totheroh; George C. Zalibra
- Edited by: Charlie Chaplin
- Distributed by: Mutual Film Corporation
- Release date: September 4, 1916
- Running time: 25 minutes (2 reels)
- Country: United States
- Languages: Silent; English intertitles

The Count

The Count is Charlie Chaplin's fifth film for Mutual Film Corporation in 1916. Released on September 4, it co-starred Eric Campbell and Edna Purviance.

== Plot ==
The tailor's handyman burns a count's trousers while ironing them and is fired. His superior discovers a note explaining the count can't attend a party, and dresses up like one to take his place.

Chaplin also goes to the residence hosting the party, but runs into the tailor. They both then struggle to win the fair maiden, Miss Moneybags. Soon, Charlie is distracted by a gypsy girl and the tailor must fend off other suitors. The real Count finally arrives, learns of the imposters and calls the police. Chaplin makes a mad dash through the party and scampers away to safety.

== Cast ==
- Charlie Chaplin - Tailor's apprentice
- Edna Purviance - Miss Moneybags
- Eric Campbell - Tailor
- Leo White - Count Broko
- Charlotte Mineau - Mrs. Moneybags
- Albert Austin - Tall Guest
- John Rand - Guest
- Leota Bryan - Young Girl
- Frank J. Coleman - Policeman
- James T. Kelley - Butler
- Eva Thatcher - Cook
- Tiny Sandford - Guest
- Loyal Underwood - Small Guest
- May White - Large Lady

== Reception ==
The Count received this positive review from the Chicago Tribune: "It has story, speed, and spontaneity. The fun is not forced--it just bubbles out. A good deal of the originality prevails and utter respectability. Some squeamish folks may take exception to Mr. Chaplin holding his nose while eating strong cheese, scratching his head with a fork, and washing his ears with watermelon juice at the table. But these vulgarities pass quickly and can be forgotten in the stress of the high comedy of the soup and the dance. Mr. Chaplin has his capacity for serious playing, but he is foremost as a clown and here he clowns superbly."

== Sound version ==
In 1932, Amedee Van Beuren of Van Beuren Studios purchased Chaplin's Mutual comedies for $10,000 each, added music by Gene Rodemich and Winston Sharples and sound effects, and re-released them through RKO Radio Pictures. Chaplin had no legal recourse to stop the RKO release.
