= The Pawnshop =

1916 film by Charlie Chaplin

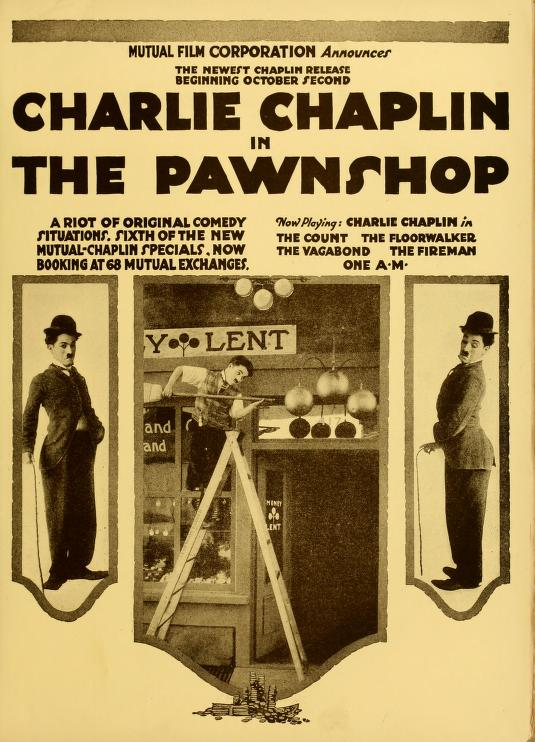
- Advertisement for film
- Directed by: Charlie Chaplin; Edward Brewer (Note: Credited as technical director)
- Written by: Charlie Chaplin; Vincent Bryan; Maverick Terrell
- Produced by: Henry P. Caulfield
- Starring: Charlie Chaplin; Edna Purviance; Henry Bergman
- Cinematography: William C. Foster; Roland Totheroh
- Edited by: Charlie Chaplin
- Distributed by: Mutual Film Corporation
- Release date: October 2, 1916
- Running time: 25 minutes
- Country: United States
- Languages: Silent; English intertitles

The Pawnshop is Charlie Chaplin's sixth film for Mutual Film Corporation. Released on October 2, 1916, it stars Chaplin in the role of assistant to the pawnshop owner, played by Henry Bergman. Edna Purviance plays the owner's daughter, while Albert Austin appears as an alarm clock owner who watches Chaplin in dismay as he dismantles the clock; the massive Eric Campbell's character attempts to rob the shop.

This is one of Chaplin's more popular movies for Mutual, mainly for the slapstick comedy he was famous for at the time.

The film is viewable free of charge on YouTube.

== Plot ==
An assistant in a pawnshop run by Henry Bergman goes about his job in a comedic manner: insulting various eccentric customers and dusting an electric fan while it is running. Quarreling over a ladder, the assistant engages in a slapstick battles with his fellow pawnshop assistant and is fired. The pawnbroker gives the assistant a second chance because of his "eleven children"—a fiction which the assistant has hastily invented for the occasion. In the kitchen the assistant flirts with the pawnbroker's attractive daughter, helping her dry dishes by passing them through a clothes wringer. When a customer brings in an alarm clock to be pawned, the assistant engages in one of his most famous solo sustained comedy bits: He thoroughly examines the clock as if he were a physician and a jeweler. He disassembles the clock piece by piece, damaging it beyond repair, and carefully puts the pieces into the man's hat. He then sorrowfully informs him that the clock can not be accepted.

A crook enters the store and pretends he wants to buy diamonds. The assistant, who has hidden in a trunk after another raucous dispute with his co-worker, spots the man trying to open the pawnshop's vault. The assistant emerges from the trunk, knocks the armed thief out. The assistant is congratulated by the pawnbroker and embraced by his daughter for his bravery and good deed.

== Cast ==
The entire film

- Charlie Chaplin: Pawnbroker's assistant
- Henry Bergman: Pawnbroker
- Edna Purviance: His daughter
- John Rand: Pawnbroker's assistant
- Albert Austin: Client with clock
- Wesley Ruggles: Client with ring
- Eric Campbell: Thief
- James T. Kelley: Old bum
- Charlotte Mineau: Client with aquarium
- Frank J. Coleman: Policeman

The role of the pawnshop proprietor is Henry Bergman's first major appearance in a Chaplin film. (He had plays a minor, uncredited role as an old man in The Floorwalker earlier in 1916.) Bergman would work closely with Chaplin until his death in 1946.

== Sound version ==
In 1932, Amedee J. Van Beuren of Van Beuren Studios, purchased Chaplin's Mutual comedies for $10,000 each, added music by Gene Rodemich and Winston Sharples and sound effects, and re-released them through RKO Radio Pictures. Chaplin had no legal recourse to stop the RKO release.

== See also ==
- Charlie Chaplin filmography
