= Police (1916 film) =

1916 film directed by Charlie Chaplin

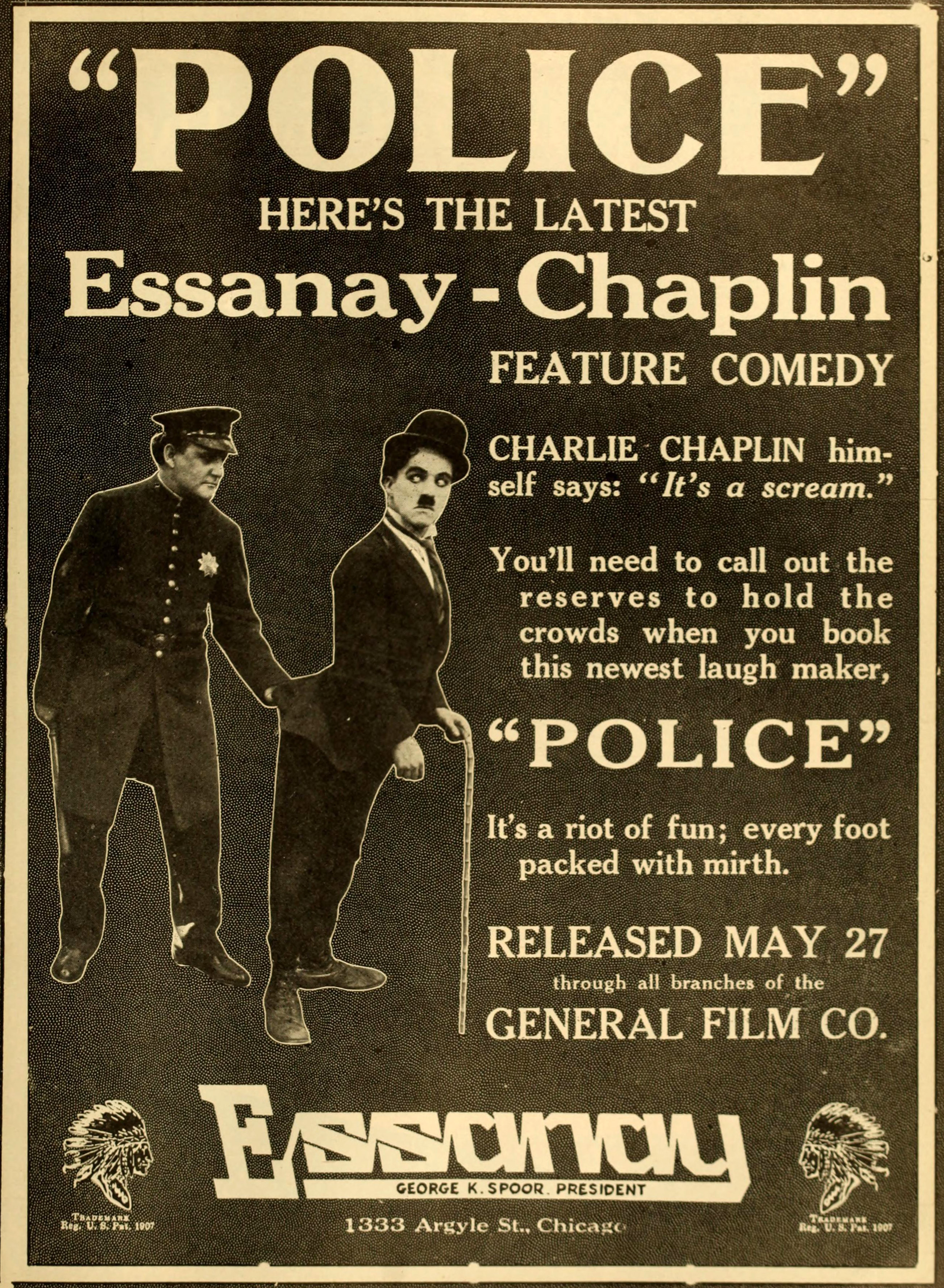
- Ad for film
- Directed by: Charlie Chaplin
- Written by: Charlie Chaplin
- Produced by: Jess Robbins
- Starring: Charlie Chaplin; Edna Purviance; Wesley Ruggles; James T. Kelley; Leo White; John Rand; Fred Goodwins; Billy Armstrong; Snub Pollard; Bud Jamison; Paddy McGuire; George Cleethorpe
- Cinematography: Harry Ensign
- Production company: Essanay Studios
- Distributed by: General Film Company
- Release date: May 27, 1916
- Running time: 34 minutes
- Country: United States
- Language: Silent (English intertitles)

Police is a 1916 film and Charlie Chaplin's 14th with Essanay Studios. It was made at the Majestic Studio in Los Angeles. Charlie plays an ex-convict who finds life on the outside not to his liking and leads him to breaking into a home with another thief (Wesley Ruggles). Edna Purviance plays the girl living in the home who tries to change him.

== Plot ==
Police

Charlie is released from prison and is immediately approached by a man who claims to be a church pastor who'll help him go straight. In reality, however, he's a scammer who frequently does disguises and swindles many other innocent people, including a drunk who seems to be in little possession of his faculties.

At first Charlie remains nonchalant, not wanting to take any chances, especially not when he was just out of prison. However, the man, a skilled actor, goads him to cry. Charlie breaks out into tears stemming from regret for "doing it against Jesus". Of course, the man takes advantage of the situation and slips out the five dollar note Charlie has been given upon being discharged, leaving him penniless.

Now broke, Charlie goes to a fruit shop and starts biting into all the fruits there. He knows he has to pay for them all in the end, but, unaware that he has been swindled by the fake church pastor, eats more and more until the fruitseller becomes visibly angry. Charlie tells him to calm down, "I'll pay for it." He searches his pockets for the money, but, unfortunately, cannot find it. This angers the man, who by now has decided he'll get the money, even if it took him a month of Sundays. Charlie, realizing that he's not in a very good situation, runs away.

He is approached by another church pastor, this time a clean-shaven one. Charlie looks at him, and suspects him right away. When this man starts suggesting that he help him go straight, Charlie refuses to be duped again by another pastor and fights him. In no mood for a fight, the man starts running, but Charlie follows suit, to scare this man a bit.

Unfortunately, a nearby constable sees Charlie chasing this seemingly well-wishing man, and joins the chase after thinking that Charlie means the man harm. Charlie stops a while after, obviously; however, he sees the policeman on his trail. Another chase begins, except this time Charlie is the chased.

After a long span of running, Charlie is tired. He finds a Flophouse advertising "Clean beds 10¢" on the sign above the door. A man stands outside the door waiting for the flophouse to open for the evening. Charlie tries to cut in front of him in line, however, the man shoves him back. "Get in line and wait for your turn."

A mild fight ensues. In the middle of it, the flophouse is opened and guests start piling in, behind them. However, neither this seemingly righteous man nor Charlie seem aware of it because they're so absorbed in their argument. Finally the man walks in and Charlie follows at the back of the line.

The proprietor collects the 10¢ fee from each guest as they file past him. A sickly looking vagrant who enters ahead of Charlie is coughing and has sunken cheeks but no money. The proprietor takes pity on the man and allows him to take a bed free of charge. Charlie hopes to slip by; however, the proprietor demands money for the bed. When Charlie fails to find even a dime in any of his pockets, he changes tactics and feigns illness hoping to illicit the proprietor's sympathy, but the proprietor will have none of it. Charlie tries to tell him his sob story but regardless he gets kicked out of the flophouse in a hilarious slapstick way.

While walking back, Charlie meets his cell-mate, who's also been discharged. He convinces Charlie to help him burglarize a house. Broke, and vulnerable, Charlie agrees. Unbeknownst to them, however, a cop in his rounds, is watching their every move, and has gotten to know of their burgling plans.

They decide to rob the house nearest. However, complications arise as they start having trouble breaking into the house. They can't seem to break in - it's just too difficult. Things get worse when the cop spying on them walks in on them, catching them red-handed, and their time seems to be up. Charlie, however, comes up with a plan. He asks him for a hammer, and when he's given the same, he knocks the policeman down unconscious.

Then, he proceeds to simply open the front door, as more of a last resort than anything. They enter with great caution. However, Charlie, clumsy as he is, bungles the entire operation up by collapsing the many glass plates and glasses, which shatter with deafening noise. Edna, who lives in the house that is being robbed, comes down to investigate. She is scared stiff, however, when she sees the duo robbing the place.

Once she regains full possession of her faculties, she quietly sneaks up to the telephone and calls the police. When they encounter one another she stalls for time by inviting them to have a meal. She persuades Charlie to go straight but not the cell-mate. When he heads upstairs she bk is his path and admonishes him with a fib that her mother is very ill and she'd die of the shock they might induce. He doesn't care and tries to push past her. A struggle ensues and Charlie intervenes, protecting her from the violent man. She's so taken with his heroism that by the time the police arrive to investigate the crime, she lies to them, stating that Charlie is her husband, and that Charlie's cellmate is the actual criminal. The police believe her, and laugh and joke with him. Once his former cellmate is arrested, she gives Charlie a dollar and sends him happily on his way.

Barely a few steps later, however, Charlie soon encounters the same nosy policeman from earlier, who recognizes him. Another chase begins.

== Cast ==
- Charlie Chaplin as Charlie, Convict 999
- Edna Purviance as Daughter of the Houseowners
- Wesley Ruggles as Jailbird and Thief
- James T. Kelley as Drunk with Pockets Picked/Second Flophouse Customer
- Leo White as Fruitseller/Flop House Manager/Policeman
- John Rand as Nosy Policeman
- Fred Goodwins as Honest Preacher/Policeman with Monocle
- Billy Armstrong as Crooked Preacher/Second Cop
- Snub Pollard as Cop
- Bud Jamison as Third Flophouse Customer
- Paddy McGuire as Fifth Flophouse Customer
- George Cleethorpe as Policeman at Station with Mustache

== Review ==
Reviewer Oscar Cooper wrote in Motion Picture News, "Those who believe that Chaplin's abilities are limited to the mallet, the kick and the spinal curvature walk, should see this picture. They will be disillusioned. They will see a touch of heart interest just at the end of the subject, and they will see that Charlie's stock pantomime includes pathos as well as fooling. But of course, the picture is mainly clever horseplay, beginning with Charlie's exit from prison, and ending with his flight from a policeman."
