= Billy Armstrong (actor) =

English actor (1891–1924)

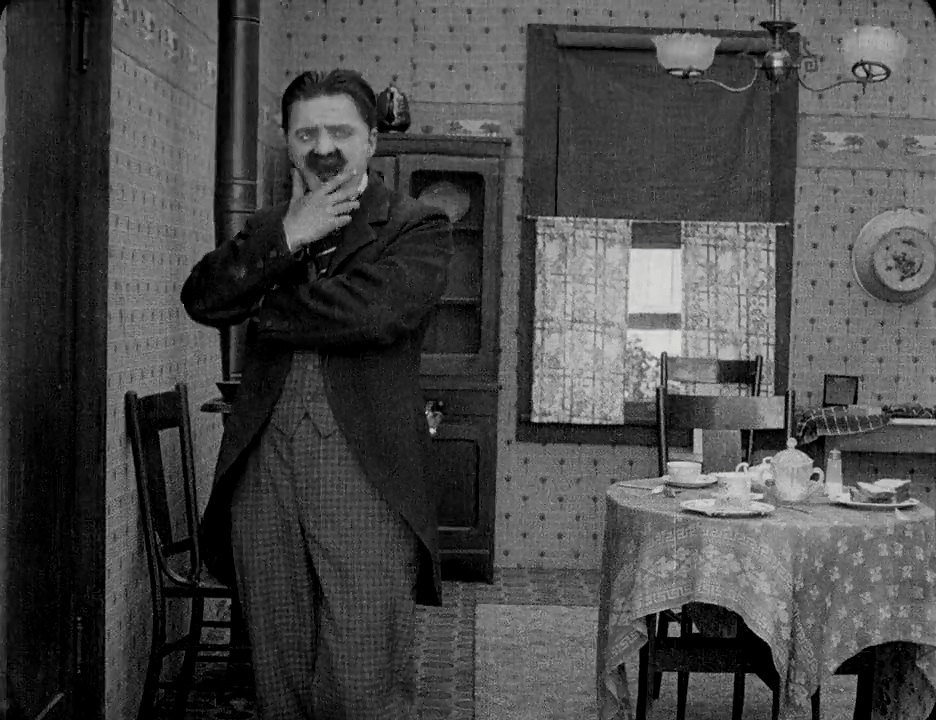
- Born: William Armstrong; 14 January 1891; Bristol, England
- Died: 1 March 1924 (aged 33); Sunland, California, US
- Occupation: Actor
- Years active: 1912–1923

William Armstrong (14 January 1891 – 1 March 1924) was a British-American actor and comedian.

== Biography ==
Armstrong was born on 14 January 1891 in Bristol, England.

Armstrong started his career in the British music hall tradition and appeared in roles for Fred Karno from 1910 until 1914 in his native Bristol, before heading to the US and working in films for Keystone Studios, mainly in comedy roles, where he was a regular player in the films of Charlie Chaplin among others.

Armstrong died from tuberculosis on 1 March 1924 in Sunland, California.

== Partial filmography ==
- His New Job (1915)
- The Champion (1915)
- In the Park (1915)
- The Tramp (1915)
- By the Sea (1915)
- Work (1915)
- A Woman (1915)
- The Bank (1915)
- Shanghaied (1915)
- Police (1916)
- Watch Your Neighbor (1918)
- Clean Sweep (1918)
- Triple Trouble (1918)
- Hop, the Bellhop (1919)
- Love, Honor and Behave (1920)
- Skirts (1921)
- When Knights Were Cold (1923)
- The Extra Girl (1923)
