= A Broadway Cowboy =

1920 film

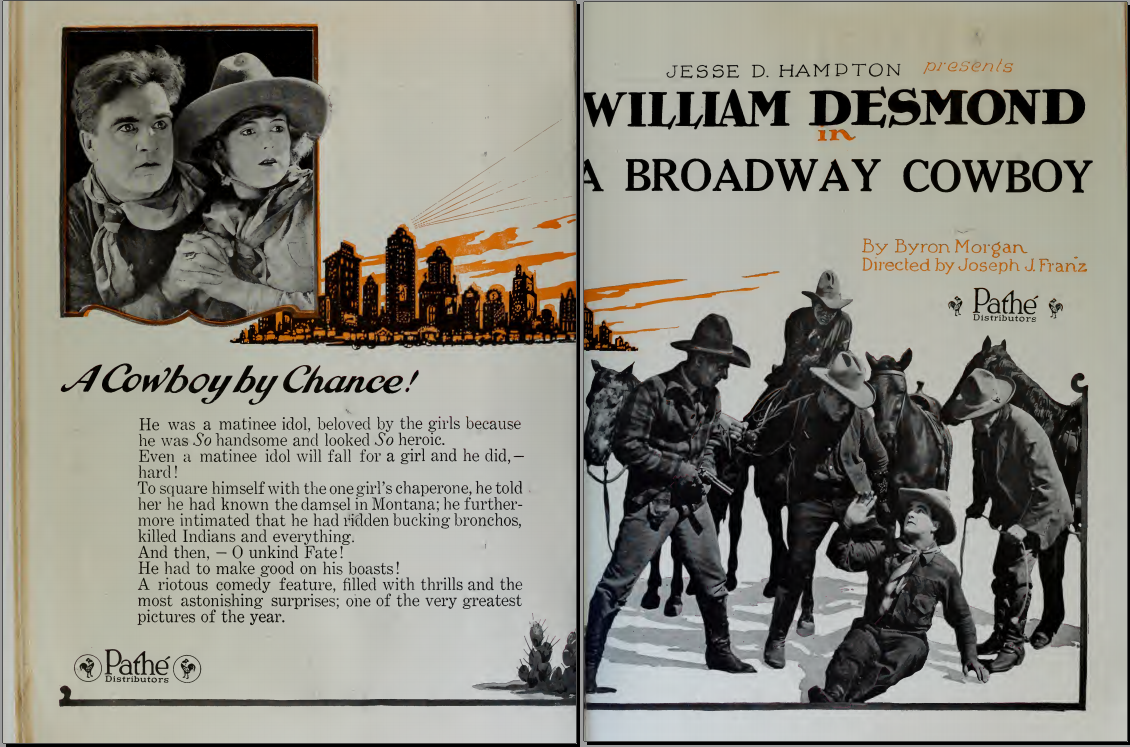
- Directed by: Joseph Franz
- Written by: George H. Plympton
- Based on: The Man from Make Believe by Byron Morgan
- Produced by: Jesse D. Hampton
- Starring: William Desmond
- Cinematography: Harry Gerstad
- Distributed by: Pathé Exchange
- Release date: July 4, 1920
- Running time: 5 reels
- Country: United States
- Languages: Silent; English intertitles

A Broadway Cowboy is a 1920 American silent Western comedy film directed by Joseph Franz and starring William Desmond. It was distributed by Pathé Exchange.

== Plot ==
As described in a film magazine, Betty Jordan, daughter of a Montana banker, is in the East attending boarding school and falls desperately in love with Burke Randolph, a matinee idol, who performs valiant deeds behind the footlights each night in the title role of an old-fashioned melodrama, The Western Knight.

She is expelled from school after Burke treats a chaperon rather roughly during an automobile ride. When Betty returns home to Montana, Sheriff Pat McGann, who is in love with her, finds a picture she has of Burke in his cowboy suit, and in a fit of jealousy sends copies of it out to the other neighboring sheriffs with the request that Burke be arrested on sight.

When his show hits a small western town, Burke is arrested. He manages to escape, and in a series of exciting incidents accidentally captures four desperadoes who in the prior night had robbed Betty's father's bank. Burke is proclaimed as a hero and wins Betty as his bride.

== Cast ==
- William Desmond as Burke Randolph
- Betty Francisco as Betty Jordan
- Thomas Delmar as Sheriff Pat McGann
- J. P. Lockney as Colonel Jordan
- Paddy McGuire as Prisoner at Large
- Clark Comstock as Sheriff Sim
- Evelyn Selbie as Miss Howell

== Preservation status ==
The film is preserved at Filmmuseum Nederlands (EYE Institut).
