= Margie Reiger =

American silent movie actress

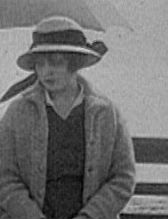
Margie Reyger in Charlie Chaplin's By the Sea (1915)

By the Sea

A Woman

Margie Reiger was a silent movie actress.

Reiger was the leading lady in Charlie Chaplin's 1915 film By the Sea. This one-reel short film was filmed in one day in the vicinity of the pier in Venice, California.

The BBFC turned down A Woman when it was submitted in March 1915, although they later relented and the film was shown in the UK in July 1916. This was either for Chaplin's transvestitism, appearing disguised as a woman, or for Charles Inslee's pursuit of Reiger in a park, the "premeditated seduction of a girl".

She acted opposite Bernard "Ben" Turpin in The Wrong Coat, also in 1915.

== Filmography ==
- Fun at a Ballgame
- Countless Count
- By the Sea (1915)
- A Woman (1915)
- The Wrong Coat
