= Harry Ensign =

American cinematographer (1883–1943)

Harry Ensign (1883 in Waterbury, Connecticut – 1943 in Hollywood) was an early American cinematographer of the silent period. He became head of the film laboratory at Paramount Pictures. He worked with Charlie Chaplin on films such as A Night in the Show (1915), A Woman (1915), By the Sea (1915), The Champion (1915), A Jitney Elopement (1915), The Bank (1915), Work (1915), A Night Out (1915), Shanghaied (1915). Police (1916), and Triple Trouble (1918).
