= John Rand (actor) =

American actor (1871–1940)

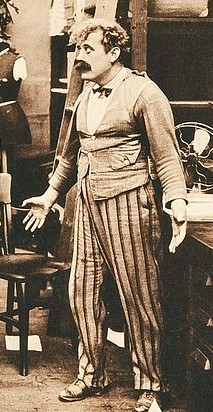
- Born: November 19, 1871
- Died: January 24, 1940 (aged 68)
- Years active: 1915–1938

John Rand (November 19, 1871 – January 24, 1940) was an American actor who started his film career in the 1910s, and most notably supported Charles Chaplin in over 20 of his subjects.

== Filmography ==
Year	Title	Role	Notes
1915	The Bank	Bank Robber and Salesman	Short, Uncredited
1915	Shanghaied	Ship's Cook	Short, Uncredited
1915	A Night in the Show	Orchestra Conductor	Short, Uncredited
1915	A Burlesque on Carmen	Escamillo - a Toreador	Short, Uncredited
1916	Police	The Cop	Short
1916	The Floorwalker	Policeman	Short, Uncredited
1916	The Fireman	Fireman	Short
1916	The Vagabond	Trumpeter	Short
1916	The Count	Guest	Short
1916	The Pawnshop	Other assistant	Short
1916	Behind the Screen	Stagehand	Short
1917	Easy Street	Mission Tramp / Policeman	Short, Uncredited
1917	The Immigrant	Tipsy diner	Short
1918	Huns and Hyphens	Unhappy Customer	Short, Uncredited
1918	Shoulder Arms	U.S. Soldier	Uncredited
1920	Down on the Farm	Villager	Uncredited
1920	Love, Honor and Behave!	Cop / Courtroom Spectator	Uncredited
1921	A Small Town Idol	Churchgoer / Movie Actor	Uncredited
1921	The Idle Class	Golfer / Guest	Short, Uncredited
1922	Pay Day	Workman	Short
1922	Bow Wow	The Country Girl's Father	
1925	The Gold Rush	Prospector	Uncredited
1928	The Circus	An Assistant Property Man	Also played a clown
1931	City Lights	Tramp Who Dives for Cigar	Uncredited
1934	Name the Woman	Janitor	
1934	Hell in the Heavens	Pilot	Uncredited
1935	Behind the Evidence	Janitor	Uncredited
1936	Modern Times	Other Waiter	Uncredited
1936	Neighborhood House	Husband	Uncredited
1937	It's All Yours	Clerk	Uncredited
1938	City Streets	Vendor	Uncredited
1938	Blondie	Gardener	Uncredited
