= Essanay Studios =

American film production company

Essanay Film Manufacturing Company
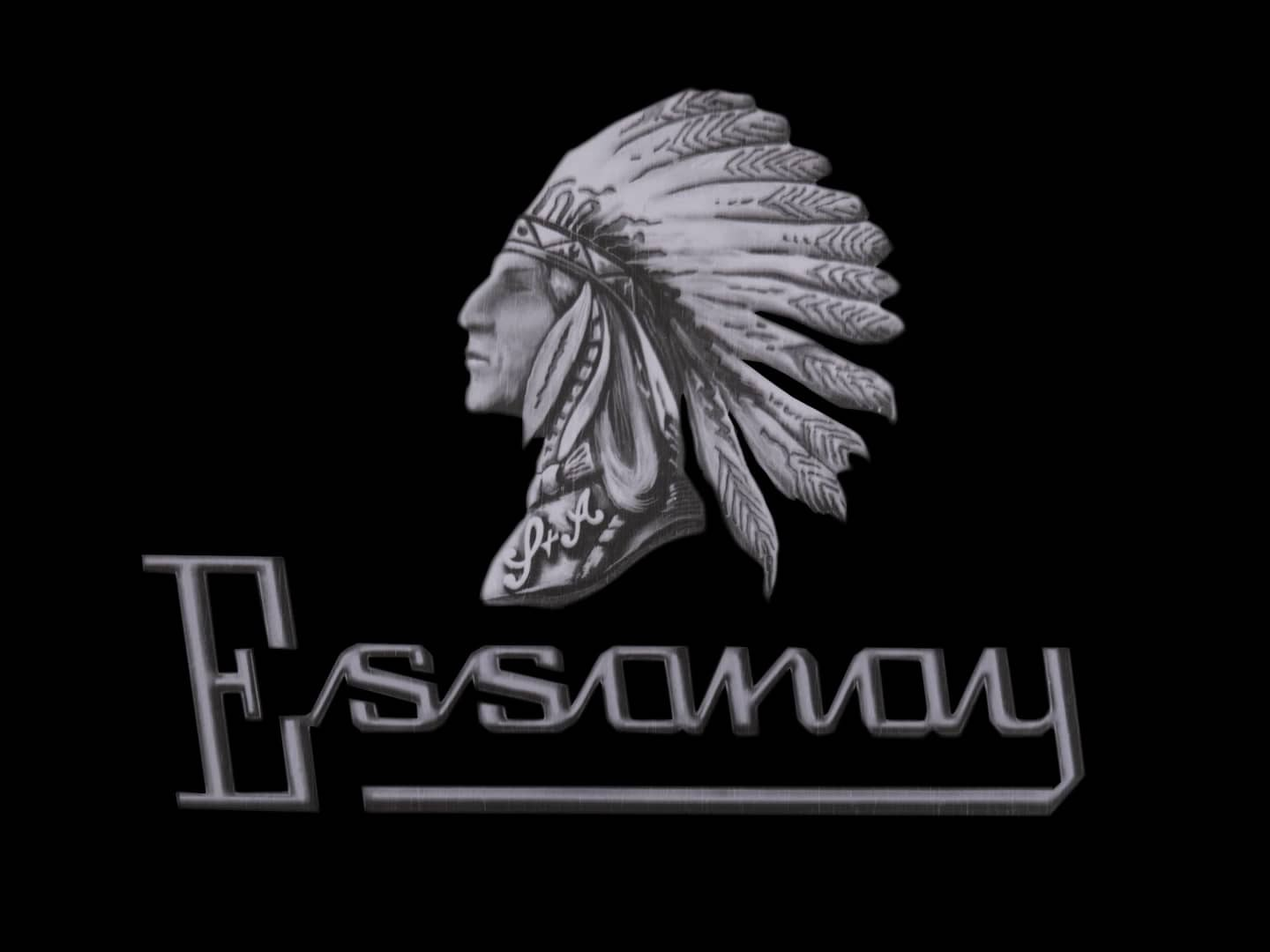
- Essanay Film Manufacturing Company logo in a still frame from a Charlie Chaplin film
- Industry: Film
- Founded: 1907
- Founder: George Kirke Spoor; Gilbert M. Anderson
- Defunct: 1918
- Fate: Defunct
- Successor: Warner Bros. United Artists

Essanay Studios, officially the Essanay Film Manufacturing Company, was an early American motion picture studio. The studio was founded in Chicago by George Kirke Spoor and Gilbert M. Anderson, originally as the Peerless Film Manufacturing Company, then as Essanay (formed by phoneticizing the founders' initials: S and A) on August 10, 1907. Essanay is probably best known today for its series of Charlie Chaplin comedies produced in 1915–1916. In late 1916, it merged distribution with other studios and stopped issuing films in the fall of 1918. According to film historian Steve Massa, Essanay is one of the important early studios, with comedies as a particular strength. Founders Spoor and Anderson were subsequently awarded special Academy Awards for pioneering contributions to film.

== Founding ==
Essanay Studios Building
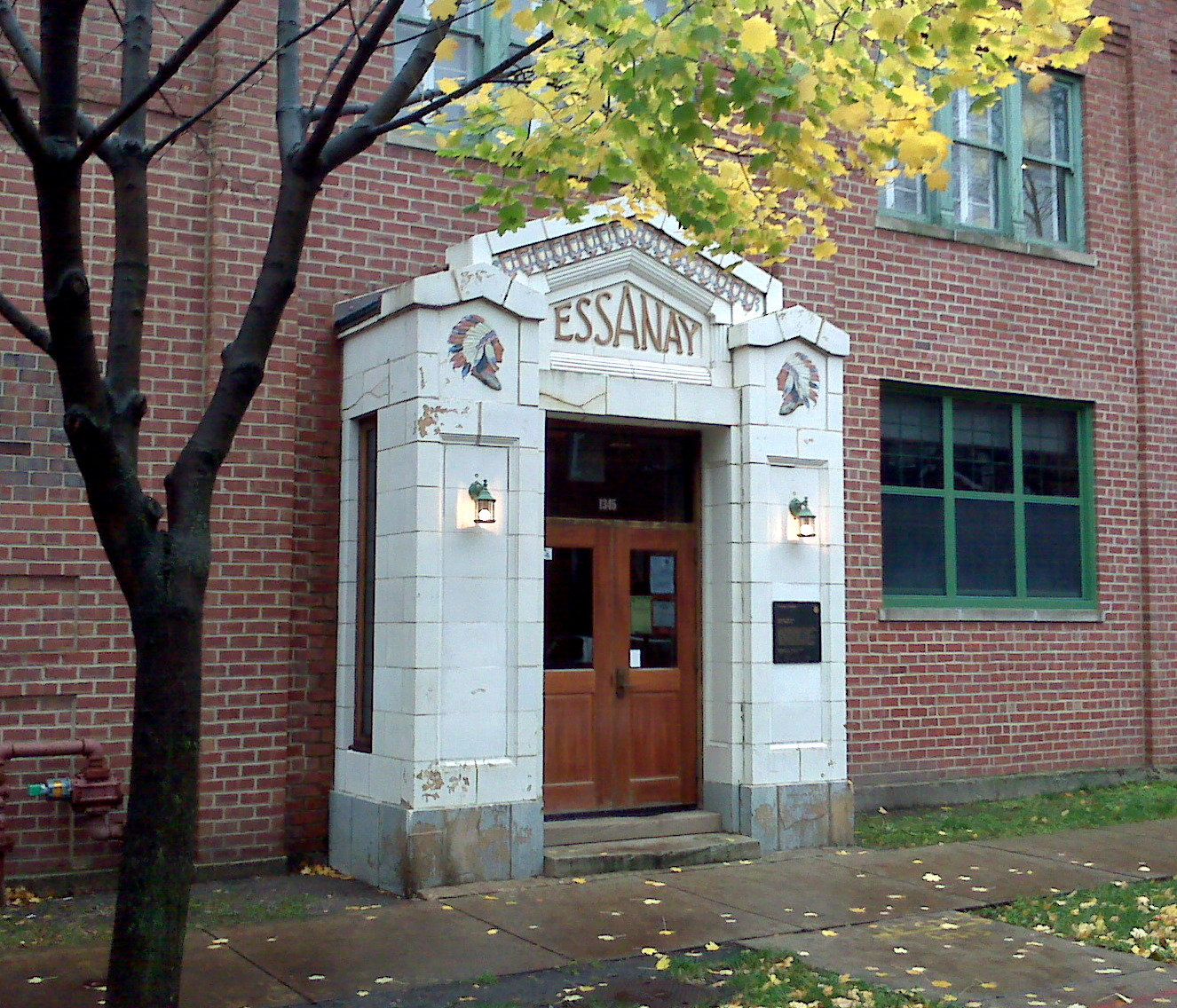

General information
- Location: 1333-45 W. Argyle St, Chicago, Illinois
- Coordinates: 41°58′21″N 87°39′50″W
- Opened: 1908

Chicago Landmark
- Designated: March 26, 1996

Essanay was originally located at 501 Wells Street (modern numbering: 1360 N. Wells). Essanay's first film, An Awful Skate, or The Hobo on Rollers (July 1907), starring Ben Turpin (then the studio janitor), produced for only a couple hundred dollars, grossed several thousand dollars in release. The studio prospered and in 1908 moved to its more famous address at 1333–45 W. Argyle Street in Uptown, Chicago.

== Leading players and staff ==
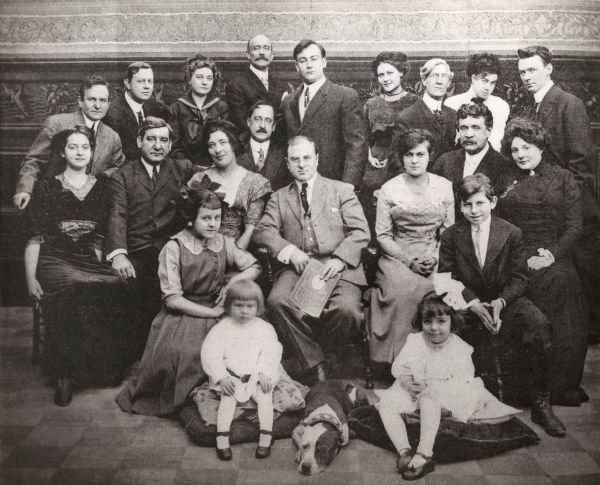
Group photograph of the Essanay stock company in Chicago, Illinois, 1911: Top row, left to right: Joseph Dailey, F. Doolittle, Inez Callahan, William J. Murray, Curtis Cooksey, Helen Lowe, Howard Missimer, Miss Lavalliet, Cyril Raymond. Middle row: Florence Hoffman, Harry Cashman, Alice Donovan, Frank Dayton, Harry McRae Webster (producer/director), Lottie Briscoe (leads), William C. Walters, Rose Evans. Bottom row: Eva Prout (Evebelle Ross Prout), Bobbie Guhl, Jack Essanay (dog), Charlotte Vacher, Tommy Shirley (Thomas P. Shirley).

Essanay produced silent films with such stars (and stars of the future) as George Periolat, Ben Turpin, Wallace Beery, Thomas Meighan, Colleen Moore, Francis X. Bushman, Gloria Swanson, Ann Little, Helen Dunbar, Lester Cuneo, Florence Oberle, Lewis Stone, Virginia Valli, Edward Arnold, Edmund Cobb, Ernest Cossart and Rod La Rocque. The mainstay of the organization, however, was studio co-owner Gilbert Anderson, starring in the very popular "Broncho Billy" Westerns, and ultimately its biggest star was Charlie Chaplin, who for a time had his own production unit at the studio.

Allan Dwan was hired by Essanay Studios as a screenwriter and developed into a well-known Hollywood director. Louella Parsons was also a screenwriter for the studio and went on to be an influential Hollywood gossip columnist. Owners Spoor (in 1948) and Anderson (in 1958) received the Oscars' Academy Honorary Award, for their efforts with Essanay.

== Productions ==
Essanay's productions include the first American film version of A Christmas Carol (1908) as well as the Western short The James Boys of Missouri (1908), which is notable for being the first biopic about the nineteenth-century American outlaw brothers Jesse and Frank James. The first pie-in-the-face gag on screen is believed to have hit Essanay star Ben Turpin in Mr. Flip (1909). The studio in 1916 also released the first American Sherlock Holmes film. Directed by Arthur Berthelet, it stars William Gillette in the title role. Animated comedies were produced as well by the Chicago company, including installments showcasing the small boy "Dreamy Dud" and his dog "Wag", who in the early 1900s were among the favorite cartoon characters of theater audiences.

== Essanay West ==
Due to Chicago's seasonal weather patterns and the popularity of Westerns, Gilbert Anderson took a part of the company west, first to Colorado. He told The Denver Post in 1909, "Colorado is the finest place in the country for Wild West stuff". The Western operations moved to California, but traveled between Northern to Southern California seasonally. This included locations in San Rafael, north of San Francisco, and Santa Barbara.

In 1912 Anderson settled on a location in Niles Canyon in the San Francisco East Bay Area, setting up in Frank Mortimer's empty barn on Second between G and H Streets, for interior scenes. The next year in the town of Niles at the mouth of Niles Canyon, "Essanay built 10 modest cottages for their actors on 2nd Street, between F and G streets, and constructed an unassuming (200-foot) studio nearby", across the street from the railroad tracks. More than 350 films were produced in Niles by Essanay. On 16 February 1916, the Niles lot was closed by George K. Spoor via telegram. By the 1930s, it had been torn down.

== Chaplin films ==
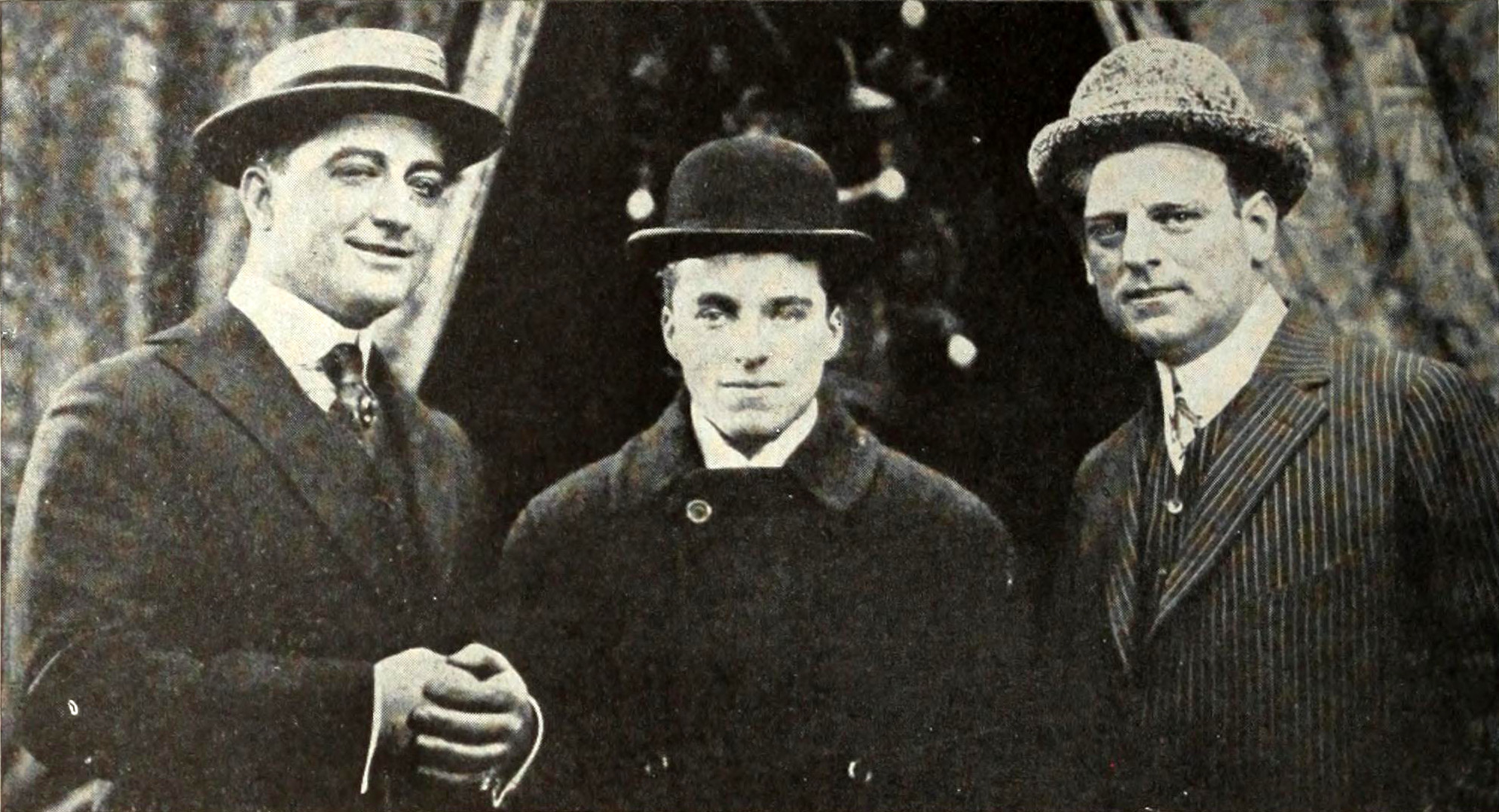
Essanay's stars in 1915: Francis X. Bushman, Charlie Chaplin and studio co-owner and actor Billy Anderson.

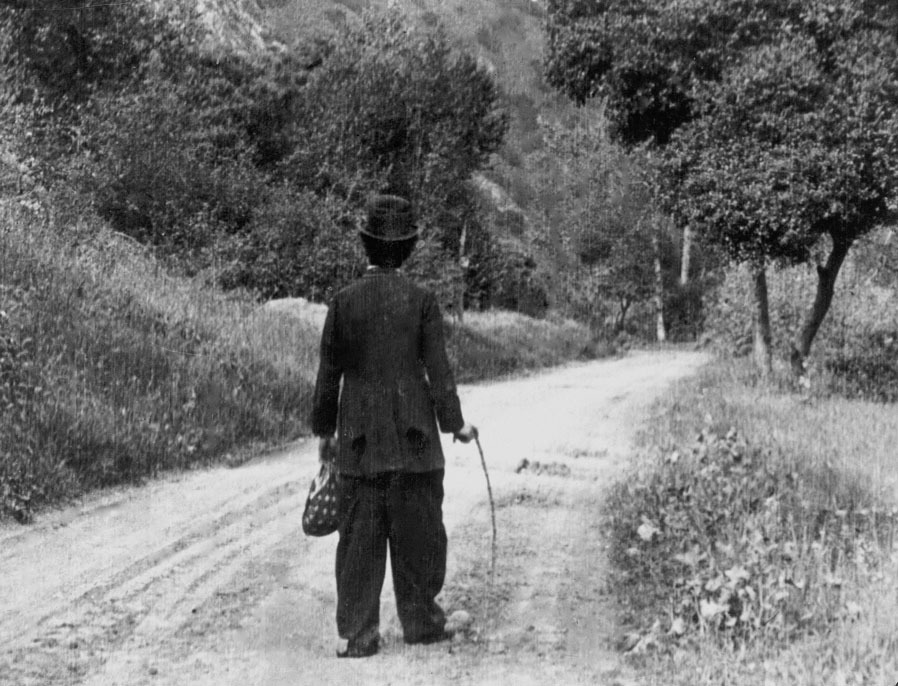
Charlie Chaplin (1915) walking down the road dejectedly, in the last scene of The Tramp, filmed on location in Niles Canyon, California.

In late 1914, Essanay succeeded in hiring Charlie Chaplin away from Mack Sennett's Keystone Studios, offering Chaplin a higher production salary and his own production unit. Chaplin made fourteen short comedies for Essanay in 1915–1916, at both the Chicago and Niles studios, plus a cameo appearance in the Broncho Billy film 'His Regeneration'. Chaplin's Essanays are more disciplined than the chaotic roughhouse of Chaplin's Keystones, with better story value and character development. The landmark film of the Chaplin series is The Tramp (1915), in which Chaplin's vagabond character finds work on a farm and is smitten with the farmer's daughter. Chaplin injected moments of drama and pathos unheard of in slapstick comedies (the tramp is felled by a gunshot wound, and then disappointed in romance). The film ends with the famous shot of the lonely tramp with his back to the camera, walking down the road dejectedly until shrugging off his disappointment.

Attempting to capitalize on the popularity of Chaplin, the studio in 1915 had its cartoon character Dreamy Dud in a Chaplin-themed short Dreamy Dud Sees Charlie Chaplin in which Dud watches a Chaplin short.

Chaplin's stock company at Essanay included Ben Turpin, who disliked working with the meticulous Chaplin and appeared with him in only a couple of films; ingenue Edna Purviance, who became his off-screen sweetheart as well; Leo White, almost always playing a fussy continental villain; and all-purpose authority figures Bud Jamison and John Rand.

Silent films were largely photographed under windowed skylights or outdoors for the natural sunlight; even some interior scenes were filmed outdoors, with theatrical scenery propped up behind the actors. Chaplin didn't like the unpredictable weather of Chicago or the chilly climate of Niles, and moved his production unit to the more temperate Los Angeles. He left Essanay after only one year for more money and more creative control elsewhere. His departure caused a rift between founders Spoor and Anderson. Chaplin was the studio's biggest moneymaker, and Essanay resorted to creating "new" Chaplin comedies from file footage and out-takes. Finally, with Chaplin off the Essanay scene for good, Essanay signed French comedian Max Linder, whose clever pantomime, often compared to Chaplin's, failed to match Chaplin's popularity in America.

== V-L-S-E, Incorporated ==
In 1915, in an effort to save the studio, Essanay entered into an agreement with Vitagraph Studios, Lubin Manufacturing Company, and Selig Polyscope Company to form a film distribution partnership known as V-L-S-E, Incorporated. It was orchestrated by Chicago distributor George Kleine. Only the Vitagraph brand name continued into the 1920s, and was absorbed by Warner Bros. in 1925.

== Black Cat films ==
In 1916, Essanay arranged a deal with William Kane, who later become the publisher and editor of The Black Cat, to acquire a hundred stories from the magazine to turn into "Black Cat" films, each about half-an-hour long. The plan was to release one picture a week, starting on December 5, 1916 with "The Egg", a comedy starring Richard Travers and Marguerite Clayton. Kane loaned Essanay a set of The Black Cat issues, complete from the first issue through May 1915, and received $1,250 from Essanay for the one hundred stories they selected. Essanay failed to return the magazines to Kane, who sued them for $20,000 compensation for the loss of the magazines, eventually winning his case in the US Supreme Court.

== Final years ==
The Chicago studio continued to produce films until 1918, reaching a total of well over 1,400 Essanay titles during its ten-year history. In a last-ditch attempt to cash in on Charlie Chaplin's popularity, Essanay cobbled together Triple Trouble, taking material from an unfinished Chaplin project called Life and having actor Leo White film new scenes in Chicago to connect the older Chaplin scenes. Exhibitors were suspicious of the film's authenticity, so Spoor went public. "I wish to state that the film is new in its entirety, just as advertised, and is not a rehash, nor a reissue under a new title," Spoor explained. "The facts are that at the time of making the picture it went under the working title of Life. [Essanay] has reissued Chaplin pictures, and has always stated that they were reissues. In Triple Trouble, however, Essanay is presenting an entirely new film as stated." The finished film found an audience, since new Chaplin comedies were then hard to come by, but the revenue wasn't enough to save the company.

George K. Spoor continued to work in the motion picture industry, introducing an unsuccessful 3-D system in 1923, and Spoor-Berggren Natural Vision, a 65 mm widescreen format, in 1930. He died in Chicago in 1953. G. M. Anderson became an independent producer, sponsoring Stan Laurel in a series of silent comedies. Anderson died in Los Angeles in 1971.

The Essanay building in Chicago was later taken over by independent producer Norman Wilding, who made industrial films and television commercials. Wilding's tenancy was much longer than Essanay's; he maintained the physical plant until at least 1967, when trade magazines stopped mentioning "Wilding, Inc." In the early 1970s, a portion of the studio was offered to Columbia College (Chicago) for one dollar, but the offer lapsed without action. Then it was given to a non-profit television corporation which sold it. One tenant was the midwest office of Technicolor. Today the Essanay lot is the home of St. Augustine's College, and its main meeting hall has been named the Charlie Chaplin Auditorium. The facility was named a Chicago Landmark in 1996.

== See also ==
- Chicago film industry
- Niles Essanay Silent Film Museum
