= The Immigrant (1917 film) =

1917 film by Charlie Chaplin

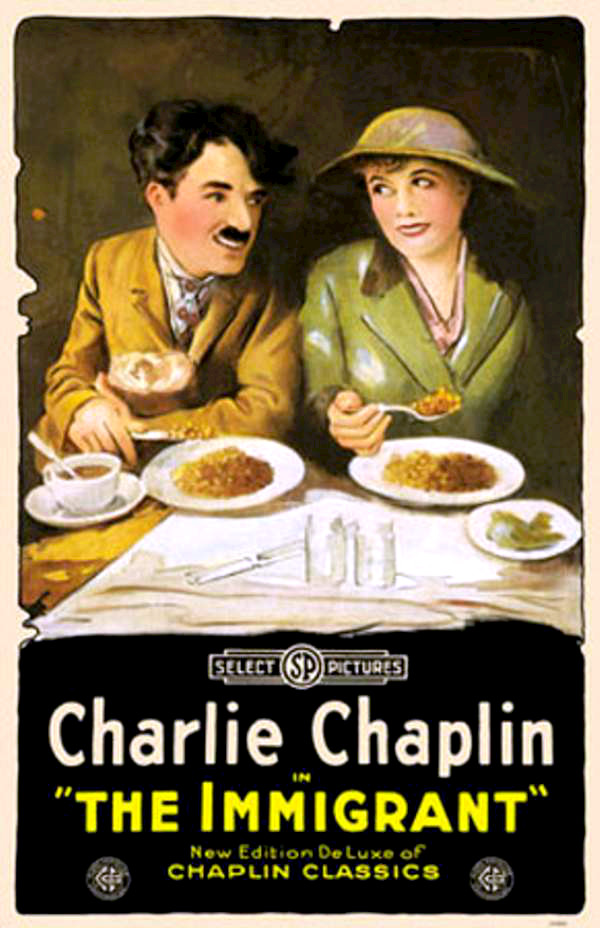
- Theatrical poster for The Immigrant (1917)
- Directed by: Charlie Chaplin
- Written by: Charlie Chaplin (scenario); Vincent Bryan (scenario); Maverick Terrell (scenario)
- Produced by: John Jasper; Charlie Chaplin
- Starring: Charlie Chaplin; Edna Purviance; Eric Campbell
- Cinematography: Roland Totheroh; George C. Zalibra
- Edited by: Charlie Chaplin
- Music by: Charlie Chaplin
- Distributed by: Mutual Film Corporation
- Release date: June 17, 1917
- Running time: 22 minutes
- Country: United States
- Languages: Silent film English intertitles

The Immigrant

The Immigrant is a 1917 American silent romantic comedy short written and directed by Charlie Chaplin. The film stars Chaplin's Tramp character as an immigrant coming to the United States who is accused of theft on the voyage across the Atlantic Ocean and falls in love with a beautiful young woman along the way. It also stars Edna Purviance and Eric Campbell.

According to Kevin Brownlow and David Gill's documentary series Unknown Chaplin, the first scenes to be written and filmed take place in what became the movie's second half, in which the penniless Tramp finds a coin and goes for a meal in a restaurant, not realizing that the coin has fallen out of his pocket. It was not until later that Chaplin's Tramp was penniless because he had just arrived on a boat from Europe and used this notion as the basis for the first half. Purviance reportedly was required to eat so many plates of beans during the many takes to complete the restaurant sequence (in character as another immigrant who falls in love with Charlie) that she became physically ill.

The scene in which Chaplin's character kicks an immigration officer was cited later as evidence of his anti-Americanism when he was forced to leave the United States in 1952. In 1998, The Immigrant was selected for preservation in the United States National Film Registry by the Library of Congress as being "culturally, historically, or aesthetically significant."

== Plot ==
The film begins aboard a steamship crossing the Atlantic Ocean and initially showcases the misadventures of an unnamed immigrant, the Little Tramp (Chaplin), who finds himself in assorted mischief. The scene opens with Charlie bent double over the side of the ship, appearing to be seasick. Then it is revealed he is only fishing.

Much humor is derived from the heavy sway of the boat, with much sliding around the deck.

Charlie, among other things, plays cards, eats in the mess hall and avoids seasick passengers. Along the way, he befriends another unnamed immigrant (Purviance) who is traveling to America with her ailing mother. The two have been robbed by a pickpocket who loses the money to the Tramp in a card game. The Tramp, feeling sorry for the two penniless women, attempts to secretly place his winnings from his card game in the woman's pocket but ends up being mistakenly accused of being a pickpocket. The woman manages to clear the Tramp's name. Upon arrival in America, the passengers stare at the Statue of Liberty but, once landed, the Tramp and the woman part company.

Later, hungry and broke, the Tramp finds a coin on the street outside a restaurant and pockets it. He doesn't realize there is a hole in his pocket, and the coin has fallen straight through and is back on the ground. He enters the restaurant, where he orders a plate of beans, bread and coffee, at first eating one bean at a time. There, he is reunited with the woman and discovers her mother is dead. The Tramp orders a second bowl of beans for her.

As they eat, they watch the restaurant's burly head waiter (Campbell) and other waiters attack and forcibly eject a patron who is short 10 cents ($2.51 in 2025) in paying his bill. The Tramp, intimidated by the waiter, checks and now realizes he has lost his coin. Terrified of facing the same treatment as the man he saw thrown out, the Tramp begins planning how he will fight the huge man. However, a stranger enters, flaunting the coin he found outside. When the headwaiter takes the coin, it also falls from his pocket onto the floor. The Tramp then makes many failed attempts to retrieve it without notice. He finally retrieves the coin and nonchalantly pays the waiter, only to be thunderstruck when the waiter reveals the coin to be fake. Once again, the Tramp prepares to fight. Just then, a visiting artist spots the Tramp and the woman and offers them a job to pose for a painting. The two agree. The artist offers to pay for the Tramp and the woman's meal, but the Tramp declines the offer several times for reasons of etiquette, intending to accept the artist's offer eventually; however, he's dismayed when the artist does not renew his offer to pay at the last moment. The artist pays for his own meal and leaves a tip for the waiter. The Tramp notices that the tip is enough to cover the couple's meal and, without the artist noticing, palms the tip and presents it to the waiter as his payment for his and the woman's meal. As a final riposte, he lets the waiter keep the remaining change — one small coin — after paying his bill. The waiter thinks the artist himself has given no tip whatsoever and is upset at this supposed action.

Afterward, outside a marriage license office in the rain, the Tramp proposes marriage to the woman, who is coy and reluctant until the Tramp physically carries her into the office while she waves her arms and kicks her feet in protest.

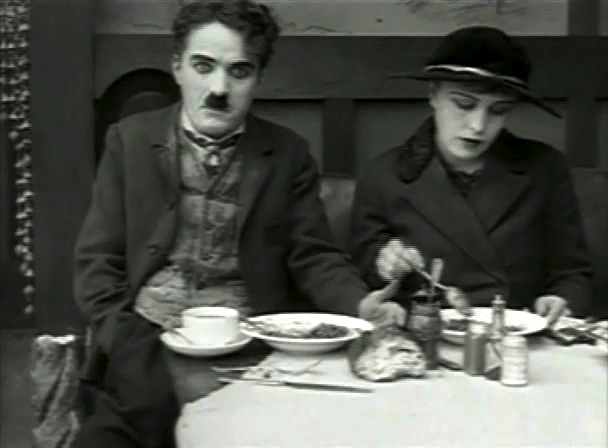
Chaplin and Purviance in the memorable restaurant scene

== Cast ==
- Charlie Chaplin - Immigrant
- Edna Purviance - Immigrant
- Eric Campbell - The head waiter
- Albert Austin - Seasick immigrant / A diner
- Henry Bergman - The artist
- Kitty Bradbury - The Mother
- Frank J. Coleman - The cheater on the boat / Restaurant Owner
- Tom Harrington - Marriage Registrar
- James T. Kelley - Shabby Man in Restaurant
- John Rand - Tipsy Diner Who Cannot Pay

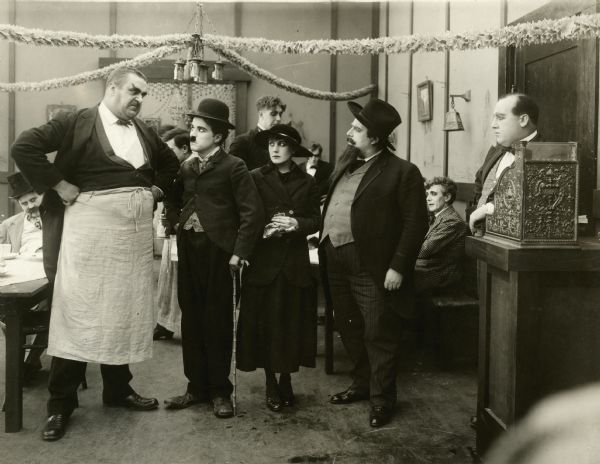
The huge waiter (played by Eric Campbell) glowers at the immigrant (Charlie Chaplin). To his right are Edna Purviance playing another immigrant and Henry Bergman as a bearded artist.

== Production ==
Chaplin developed the storyline for The Immigrant as filming progressed. Initially, the movie began as a comedy set in an artists' cafe, with Purviance as a brightly dressed patron.

This plot was abandoned almost immediately, before Chaplin's character was introduced, according to the documentary Unknown Chaplin, and Chaplin began again, with a story, still set in a cafe, about a man who has never been in a restaurant before displaying terrible table manners before meeting a lovely girl (Purviance) and shaping up. Initially, Henry Bergman played the bully-ish head waiter, but Chaplin eventually replaced him with Eric Campbell.

According to Unknown Chaplin, Chaplin developed the idea of the tramp and Purviance's character being immigrants when he realized he needed more plot to justify the restaurant scenes. After filming the film's opening sequences of the arrival in America, he reshot parts of the restaurant scene to be consistent with the new plot (bringing Bergman back in a new role as an artist who resolves the subplot of Charlie being unable to pay for dinner), and added the epilogue in which the Tramp and Purviance are married.

== Sound version ==
In 1932, Amedee Van Beuren of Van Beuren Studios, purchased Chaplin's Mutual comedies for $10,000 each, added music by Gene Rodemich and Winston Sharples and sound effects, and re-released them through RKO Radio Pictures. Chaplin had no legal recourse to stop the RKO release.

== Reception ==
Like many American films of the time, The Immigrant was subjected to some cuts by city and state film censorship boards. The Chicago Board of Censors required two cuts to the film, the first being the closeup showing the stealing of a moneybag, and the second involving nose thumbing as an insult.

== See also ==
- Charlie Chaplin filmography
- Chaplin (film)
