= The Vagabond (1916 film) =

1916 film by Charlie Chaplin

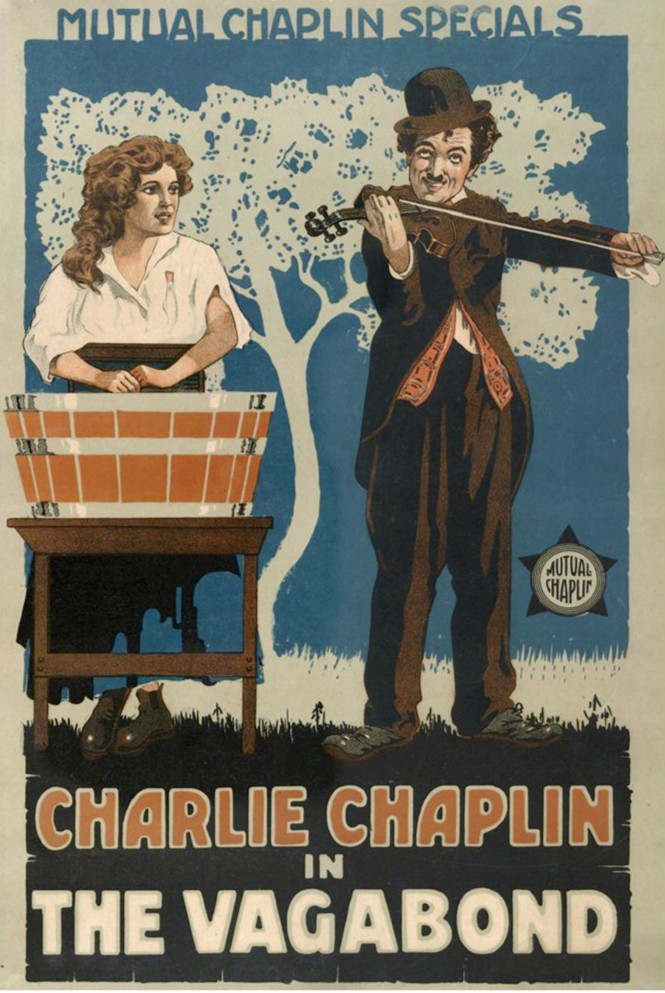
- Theatrical poster to The Vagabond
- Directed by: Charles Chaplin; Edward Brewer (technical director)
- Written by: Charles Chaplin (scenario); Vincent Bryan (scenario); Maverick Terrell (scenario)
- Produced by: Henry P. Caulfield
- Starring: Charles Chaplin; Edna Purviance; Eric Campbell
- Cinematography: William C. Foster; Roland Totheroh
- Edited by: Charles Chaplin
- Distributed by: Mutual Film Corporation
- Release date: July 10, 1916
- Running time: 24 minutes
- Country: United States
- Language: Silent

The Vagabond is a 1916 American silent romantic comedy film by Charlie Chaplin and his third film with Mutual Films. Released to theaters on July 10, 1916, it co-starred Edna Purviance, Eric Campbell, Leo White and Lloyd Bacon. This film echoed Chaplin's work on The Tramp, with more drama and pathos mixed in with the comedy.

== Plot ==
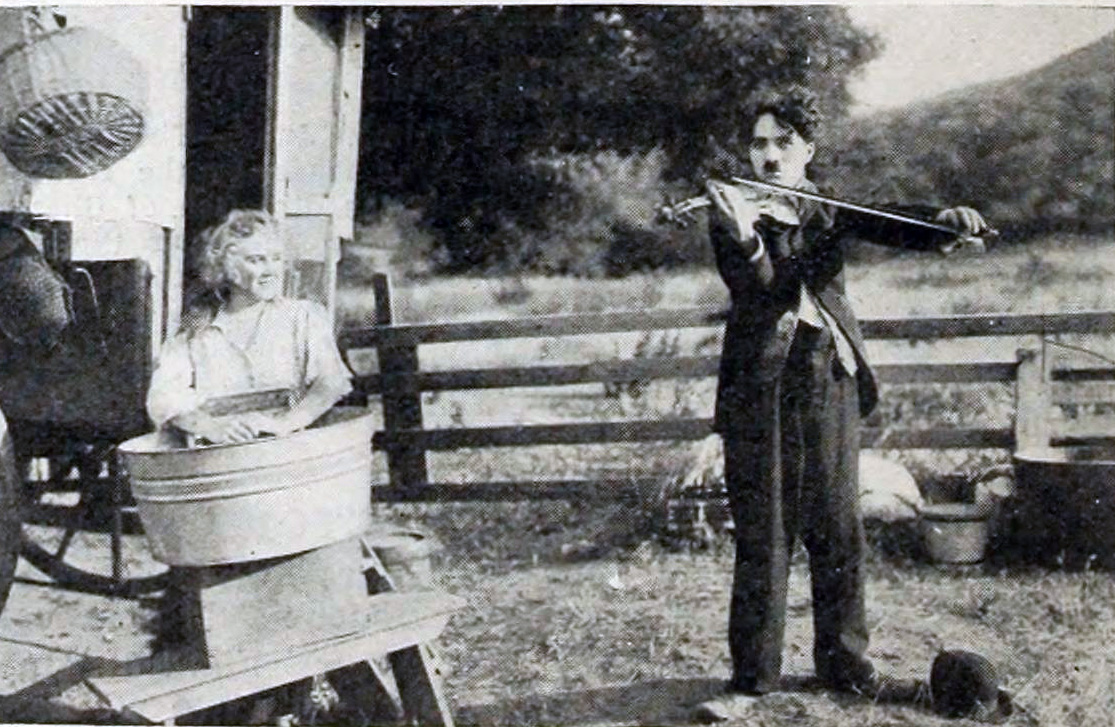
The Vagabond (1916)

Charlie, the Tramp, arrives at a bar, and plays violin to raise money, exciting a rivalry with competing musicians. This results in a barroom brawl and comic mayhem.

Wandering off into the vicinity of a gypsy caravan in the country, he encounters the beautiful, though bedraggled, Edna. He entertains her with his violin. She has been abducted and abused by the gypsies, chief among them Eric Campbell, who whips her mercilessly. Charlie comes to her rescue and knocks her tormentors over the head with a stick before riding off with her in a commandeered cart. Love develops between them as Charlie washes Edna's face in a bowl and combs her hair. He makes breakfast while she goes to fetch water. On the way Edna meets an artist who lacks inspiration. Edna is his muse and he paints her, including her unique shamrock-shaped birthmark. Edna falls for him and brings him back to the cart where the two talk, while Charlie is ignored. The artist leaves and she is stuck with Charlie.

The resulting painting is seen by the girl's mother who recognizes the unusual birthmark and rushes with the artist to rescue her daughter. They find her with Charlie, who refuses payment from the mother and sadly says goodbye. Edna is driven off in a limousine with her mother, others, and the artist—only to realize she loves Charlie. She orders the car to reverse and take him along with her.

== Cast ==
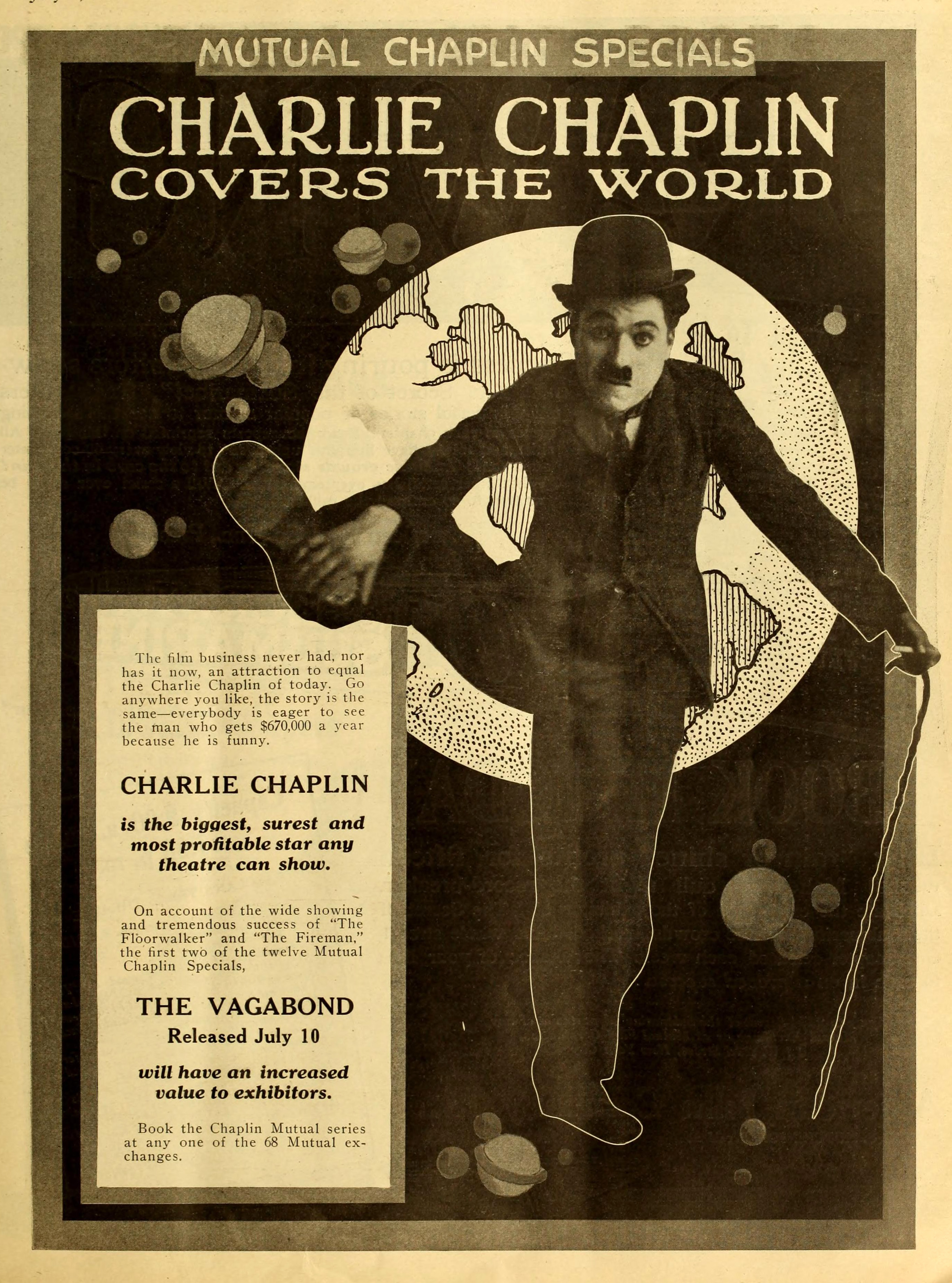
Advertising

- Charles Chaplin as Saloon Violinist
- Edna Purviance as Gypsy Drudge
- Eric Campbell as Gypsy Chieftain
- Leo White as Old Jew/Gypsy Woman
- Lloyd Bacon as Artist and Gypsy
- Charlotte Mineau as Girl's Mother
- Albert Austin as Trombonist
- John Rand as Trumpeter, Band Leader
- James T. Kelley as Gypsy and Musician
- Frank J. Coleman as Gypsy and Musician
- Phyllis Allen (uncredited)
- Henry Bergman (uncredited)
- Fred Goodwins Percussionist/Gypsy (uncredited)

== Reception ==
Louis Reeves Harrison wrote in The Moving Picture World, "The latter part of this story shows Chaplin in a new role, and he handles it well in spite of the necessity of being as funny as possible. He would make an interesting lead in almost any story if it were possible for him to divest himself of the little tricks which have made him famous. Those little tricks still go, and they pay, but it would be a novelty to see Chaplin free to do without them in some opportunity of a reverse, or much different, character."

The film was briefly discussed in Motion Picture Magazine, where it was described as "Almost a comedy-drama, in which heart interest mixes well with broad farce. Edna Purviance, as the 'stolen child,' is an excellent support."

== Sound version ==
The Vagabond

In 1932, Amedee Van Beuren of Van Beuren Studios, purchased Chaplin's Mutual comedies for $10,000 each, added music by Gene Rodemich and Winston Sharples and sound effects, and re-released them through RKO Radio Pictures. Chaplin had no legal recourse to stop the RKO release.
