= The Fireman (1916 film) =

1916 film directed by Charlie Chaplin

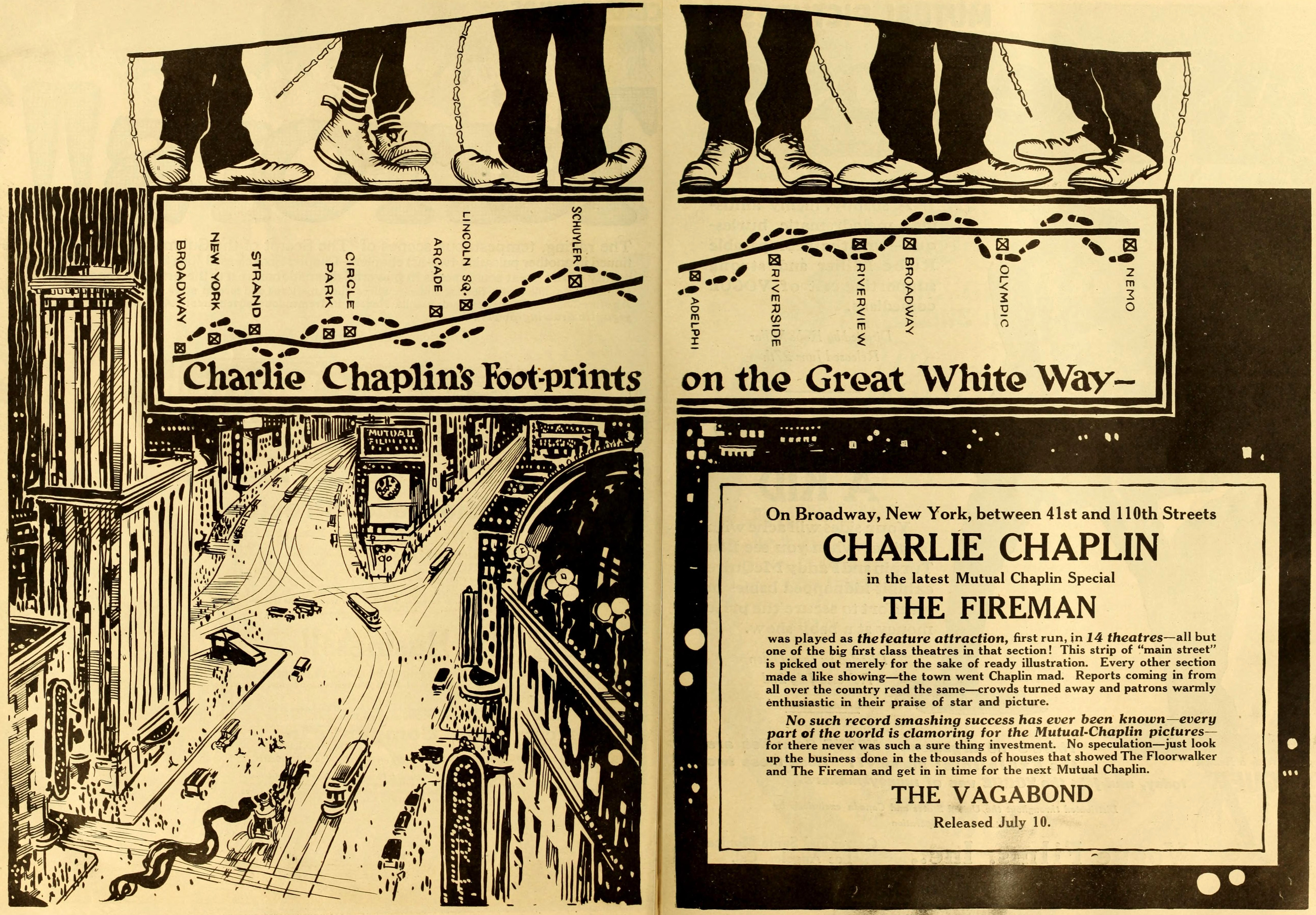
- Advertisement
- Directed by: Charlie Chaplin; Edward Brewer (technical director)
- Written by: Charlie Chaplin (scenario); Vincent Bryan (scenario); Maverick Terrell (scenario)
- Produced by: Henry P. Caulfield
- Starring: Charlie Chaplin; Edna Purviance; Lloyd Bacon; Eric Campbell
- Cinematography: William C. Foster; Roland Totheroh
- Edited by: Charlie Chaplin
- Distributed by: Mutual Film Corporation
- Release date: June 12, 1916
- Running time: 32 minutes (2-reels)
- Country: United States
- Languages: Silent; English intertitles

The film

The Fireman is a 1916 film and the second one Charlie Chaplin distributed by the Mutual Film Corporation. Released on June 12, it starred Chaplin as the fireman and Edna Purviance as the daughter to Lloyd Bacon. The film is viewable free of charge on YouTube.

== Plot ==
A group of firemen, led by their foreman, practice in the fire station, but one is missing...Charlie. He is still sleeping. The bell eventually wakes him and he slides down the pole to join the others. He reverses the pair of horses onto the fire engine and drives off, but without the others. He reverses the horses back again. Their first task is to polish the engine, but a lot of butt-kicking ensues.

During their meal break Charlie uses the engine as a giant water urn and serves an unappetising soup to the others.

A young woman comes to the station with her aristocratic father, and the foreman sends Charlie away so he can talk with the father. Charlie and the girl flirt on one side of the station while the girl's father arranges with the local fire chief to have his house burn down so he can collect the insurance money. In exchange for the chief's complicity in the arson, the father will permit the fire chief to marry his daughter.

However, a real fire breaks out elsewhere in the town. The owner uses a public alarm to signal to the station but Charlie and another fireman continue to play draughts and ignore the alarm, putting a cloth in the bell to stop it ringing. The worried man then phones the fire station but they still ignore him. Finally he goes to the fire station in person. Eventually Charlie understands the predicament, and finds the fire chief at the girl's house and the company rush to extinguish the fire. Charlie mans the hose but his aim is poor and the chief has to take over.

Meanwhile, the father deliberately sets a fire in the basement of his own house without realizing that his daughter is still inside the house on the upper floor. Upon knowing his daughter is in mortal danger from the fire, he rushes to find the fire chief to cancel the arrangement not to extinguish his house fire. The fireman, who is also in love with the daughter, abandons the first house fire (taking the fire engine and water) to rush to the second one. The water tank falls off during the rush. He heroically scales the outside of the building to save her, carrying her back down the face of the building, but then fainting. When he revives he and the girl go off arm in arm.

== Cast ==
- Charlie Chaplin as Fireman
- Edna Purviance as Girl
- Lloyd Bacon as Her Father
- Eric Campbell as Foreman of the Brigade
- Leo White as Owner of Burning House
- Albert Austin as Fireman
- John Rand as Fireman
- James T. Kelley as Fireman
- Frank J. Coleman as Fireman

== Production ==
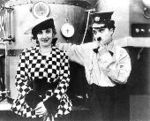
scene from film with Edna Purviance

The film shows some early morning street scenes in the surrounding Los Angeles area.

The film makes use of reversing the film several times for comic effect: sliding up the fireman's pole, reversing the horses, hurrying back to station (in reverse) when he forgets the crew etc. The huge water tank in the station also comically has a second function as the coffee machine.

== Reviews ==
A critic for the New York Dramatic Mirror wrote, "The Fireman is the second of the Chaplin Mutual comedies, presenting that well-known hero in a whirl of fun and laughter that compares favorably with the best work he has yet done on the screen."

A reviewer from the Chicago Tribune was more critical in his appraisal of The Fireman. He wrote, "There is more of soup-spilling and Keystone kicking than is necessary for successful slapsticking, but there is also a certain novelty of situation and a jolly humor in its expression that moves to much mirth. Charles Chaplin is a true comedian who doesn't need to resort to the conflict of the physical to make fun. He has a sufficiently mobile expression to do that."

== Sound version ==
In 1932, Amedee Van Beuren of Van Beuren Studios, purchased Chaplin's Mutual comedies for $10,000 each, added music by Gene Rodemich and Winston Sharples and sound effects, and re-released them through RKO Radio Pictures. Chaplin had no legal recourse to stop the RKO release.

== See also ==
- List of firefighting films
