= The Rink (film) =

1916 film by Charlie Chaplin

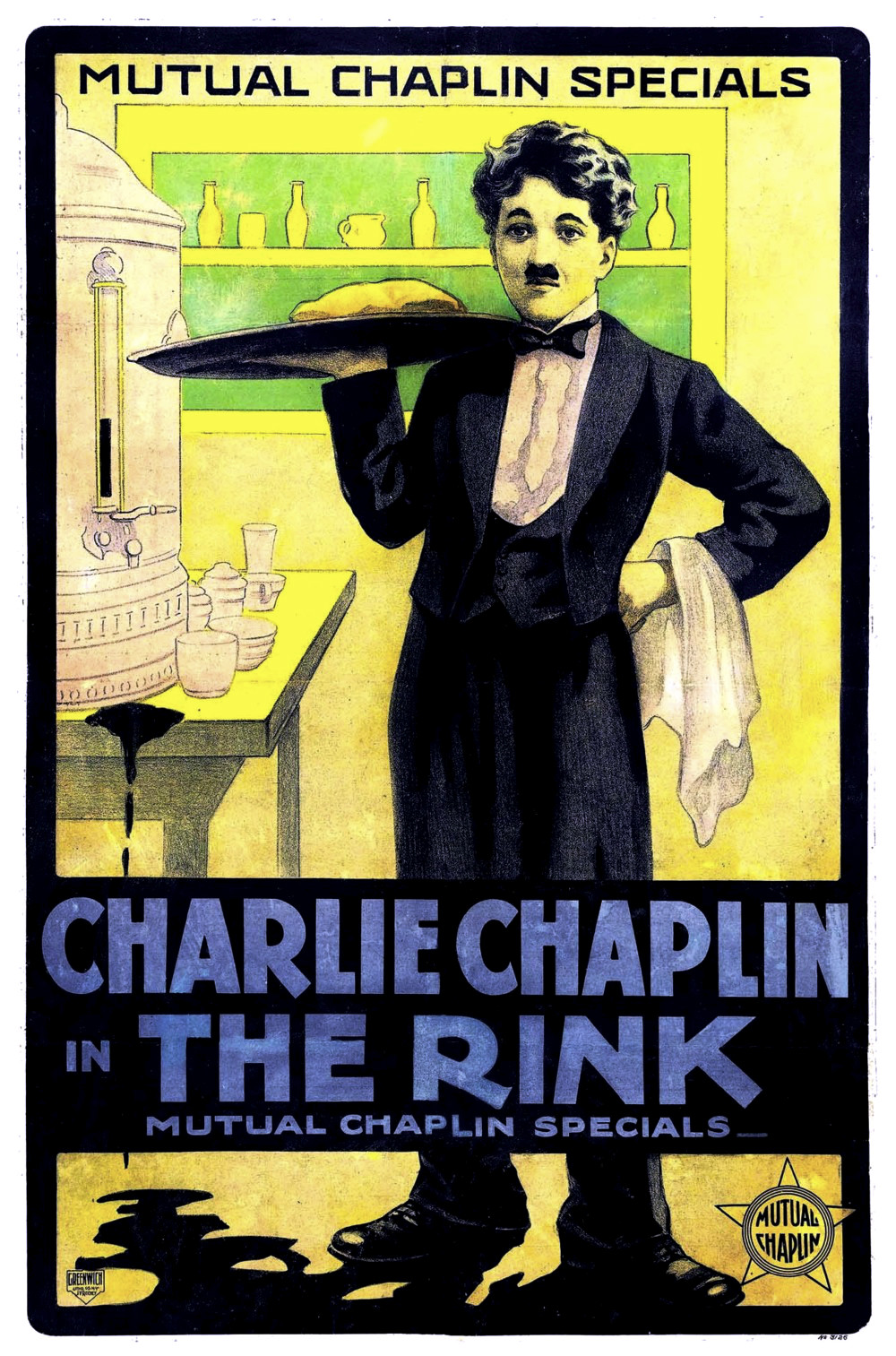
- Theatrical poster to The Rink
- Directed by: Charlie Chaplin; Edward Brewer (technical director)
- Written by: Charlie Chaplin (scenario); Vincent Bryan (scenario); Maverick Terrell (scenario)
- Produced by: Henry P. Caulfield
- Starring: Charlie Chaplin; Edna Purviance; Eric Campbell; Henry Bergman; Albert Austin
- Cinematography: Roland Totheroh; George C. Zalibra
- Edited by: Charlie Chaplin
- Distributed by: Mutual Film Corporation
- Release date: December 4, 1916
- Running time: 24 minutes
- Country: United States
- Languages: Silent; English intertitles

The Rink

The Rink, a silent film from 1916, is Charlie Chaplin's eighth film for Mutual Films. The film co-starred Edna Purviance, Eric Campbell, Henry Bergman, and Albert Austin, and is best known for showcasing Chaplin's roller skating skills. Chaplin's obvious skill on roller skates surprised many of his fans, but Charlie was an experienced performer. As a touring vaudevillian with Fred Karno's pantomime troupe, Chaplin appeared in a roller-skating skit in which he displayed a talent for comedic falls—and the ability to cause other skaters to topple.

== Plot ==
Charlie is an inept and sometimes clumsy waiter at a restaurant. He is serving one of his customers, the hot-tempered Mr. Stout. Charlie determines his bill by examining what he has spilled on his suit. While he is not a great server, Charlie is an excellent skater at the nearby roller rink. He meets a girl there and saves her from the unwanted attentions of the same Mr. Stout he earlier encountered at the restaurant. The grateful girl invites Charlie to a skating party. Charlie accepts and attends the party in top hat and tails. He again encounters the volatile Mr. Stout and runs afoul of Mrs. Stout. While skating, Charlie accidentally falls on her and pulls down her skirt. The skating party quickly descends into a riot. The police are called to restore order, but Charlie escapes by deftly rolling away with his cane hooked to the back of a moving automobile.

== Cast ==
- Charlie Chaplin - A Waiter. Posing as Sir Cecil Seltzer, C.O.D.
- Edna Purviance - The Girl
- James T. Kelley - Her Father
- Eric Campbell - Mr. Stout, Edna's Admirer
- Henry Bergman - Mrs. Stout and Angry Diner
- Lloyd Bacon - Guest
- Albert Austin - The Cook and Skater
- Frank J. Coleman - Restaurant Manager
- John Rand - Waiter
- Leota Bryan - Friend of Edna
- Charlotte Mineau - Friend of Edna
- Fred Goodwins - Man in the jacket

== Reception ==
A reviewer from Variety positively wrote, "There is plenty of fun provided by [Chaplin] on the rollers and he displayed a surprising cleverness on them. A number of funny falls occurred as was looked for, with Charlie outshining and outwitting any of the others on the floor."

== Sound version ==
In 1932, Amedee Van Beuren of Van Beuren Studios, purchased Chaplin's Mutual comedies for $10,000 each, added music by Gene Rodemich and Winston Sharples and sound effects, and re-released them through RKO Radio Pictures. Chaplin had no legal recourse to stop the RKO release.
