= The Floorwalker =

1916 short film directed by Charlie Chaplin

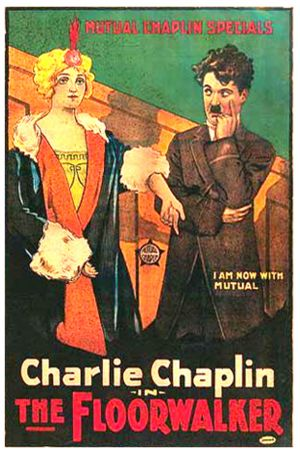
- Theatrical poster to The Floorwalker
- Directed by: Charlie Chaplin; Edward Brewer (technical director)
- Written by: Charlie Chaplin (scenario); Vincent Bryan (scenario); Maverick Terrell (scenario)
- Produced by: Henry P. Caulfield
- Starring: Charlie Chaplin; Eric Campbell; Edna Purviance
- Cinematography: William C. Foster; Roland Totheroh
- Edited by: Charlie Chaplin
- Distributed by: Mutual Film Corporation
- Release date: May 15, 1916
- Running time: 2 reels (24 minutes in restored, speed-corrected version)
- Country: United States
- Language: Silent (English intertitles)

The full film

The Floorwalker is a 1916 American silent comedy film, Charlie Chaplin's first Mutual Film Corporation film. The film stars Chaplin, in his traditional Tramp persona, as a customer who creates chaos in a department store and becomes inadvertently entangled in the nefarious scheme of the store manager, played by Eric Campbell, and the store's floorwalker, played by Lloyd Bacon, to embezzle money from the establishment. The film is viewable free of charge on YouTube.

The film is noted for the first "running staircase" used in films which is used for a series of slapstick that climaxes with a frantic chase down an upward escalator and finding they are remaining in the same position on the steps no matter how fast they move. Edna Purviance plays a minor role as a secretary to the store manager.

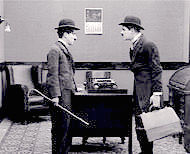
Mirror scene

== Plot ==
The store manager and the floorwalker are conspiring to rob the store's safe.

Charlie enters the department store and annoys the staff with his antics, primarily taking a shave on the shaving product table. He has a fight with the floor manager. The store detective keeps a close eye on him.

When the store manager and floorwalker finish putting the safe's contents into a bag, the floorwalker knocks out the manager and flees with the money. Just as the floorwalker is about to exit, he encounters Charlie who looks very much like him. He persuades Charlie to act as his substitute. Nevertheless, the floorwalker is arrested, but Charlie ends up holding the bag. The manager thinks Charlie is the floorwalker who stole the money and throttles him. Charlie does not understand why he attacks him. Charlie waters the hats with flowers on then goes to the shoe department to help a girl.

The manager finds his female secretary with the bag and takes it. Trying to slip out he puts it down in the suitcase department and Charlie sells it to a customer. Back in the office he carries Charlie by the throat then they fight.

He then sees Charlie with the bag and begins to chase him around the store. At one point the two men are running down an upward escalator without getting anywhere.

Police become involved in the chase and the manager ends up with his head stuck in an elevator—while Charlie helps to keep it there.

== Cast ==
- Charlie Chaplin as the New Floorwalker (Tramp)
- Eric Campbell as Store manager
- Edna Purviance as Manager's secretary
- Lloyd Bacon as Assistant manager
- Albert Austin as Shop assistant
- Charlotte Mineau as Beautiful store detective
- Leo White as A Customer
- Henry Bergman as Old Man (uncredited)
- Frank J. Coleman as Janitor (uncredited)
- Bud Jamison (Small Role, uncredited)
- James T. Kelley as Lift Boy (uncredited)
- Tom Nelson as Detective (uncredited)
- John Rand as Policeman (uncredited)
- Wesley Ruggles as Policeman (uncredited)
- Tiny Sandford (Small Role, uncredited)

== Production ==
The Floorwalker was the first film Chaplin made for the Mutual Company. It also marked the first Chaplin comedy in which Eric Campbell played the huge, menacing villain. This film also marked Henry Bergman's first of numerous appearances in Chaplin films. Bergman would typically play an authority figure or an upper-crust society gentleman—the perfect comic foil for Charlie's Tramp character. Bergman would work closely with Chaplin until his death from a heart attack in 1946.

== Mirror sequence ==
Roughly seven minutes from the start of the film, Chaplin and the store's floorwalker, Lloyd Bacon, stumble into opposite doors of an office and are intrigued by their likeness to each other. They mirror each other's movements to deft comic effect in a way that is believed to have inspired the "mirror scene" in Max Linder's Seven Years Bad Luck (1921). In that comedy film, Max's servants accidentally break a mirror and try to hide their mistake by having one of them dress just like their employer. Then, when Max looks into the non-existent glass, the disguised servant mimics his every action. Another possibility is that Chaplin was inspired by Linder, since Linder performed a similar mirror routine in his 1913 short Le duel de Max.

Max Linder's movie in turn inspired many similar scenes, most famously in the Marx Brothers film Duck Soup. Later renditions can be found in the Bugs Bunny cartoon Hare Tonic, the Mickey Mouse cartoon Lonesome Ghosts, the Tom and Jerry cartoon Cat and Dupli-cat and in the TV series Family Guy and The X-Files. A scene in The Pink Panther, with David Niven and Robert Wagner wearing identical gorilla costumes, mimics the mirror scene. Harpo Marx did a reprise of this scene, dressed in his usual costume, with Lucille Ball also donning the fright wig and trench coat, in an episode of I Love Lucy. Additionally, an early episode of The Patty Duke Show contains a mirror scene in which the characters Patty and Cathy Lane (both played by Patty Duke) act out a version similar to the one found in the film Duck Soup.

== Review ==
Maxson F. Judell glowingly wrote of The Floorwalker in the Madison (WI) State Journal, "Performing in inimitable style on an escalator, or in common parlance, a moving stairway, injecting new 'business' such as he has not given the public in previous comedies, producing the film carefully with adequate settings and excellent photography, supported by a well-chosen cast, Charles Chaplin proves conclusively that he is without question of doubt the world's greatest comedian. Chaplin possesses that indefinable something which makes you laugh heartily and without restraint at what in others would be called commonplace actions."

== Sound version ==
In 1932, Amedee Van Beuren of Van Beuren Studios, purchased Chaplin's Mutual comedies for $10,000 each, added music by Gene Rodemich and Winston Sharples and sound effects, and re-released them through RKO Radio Pictures.
