= Easy Street (1917 film) =

1917 film directed by Charlie Chaplin

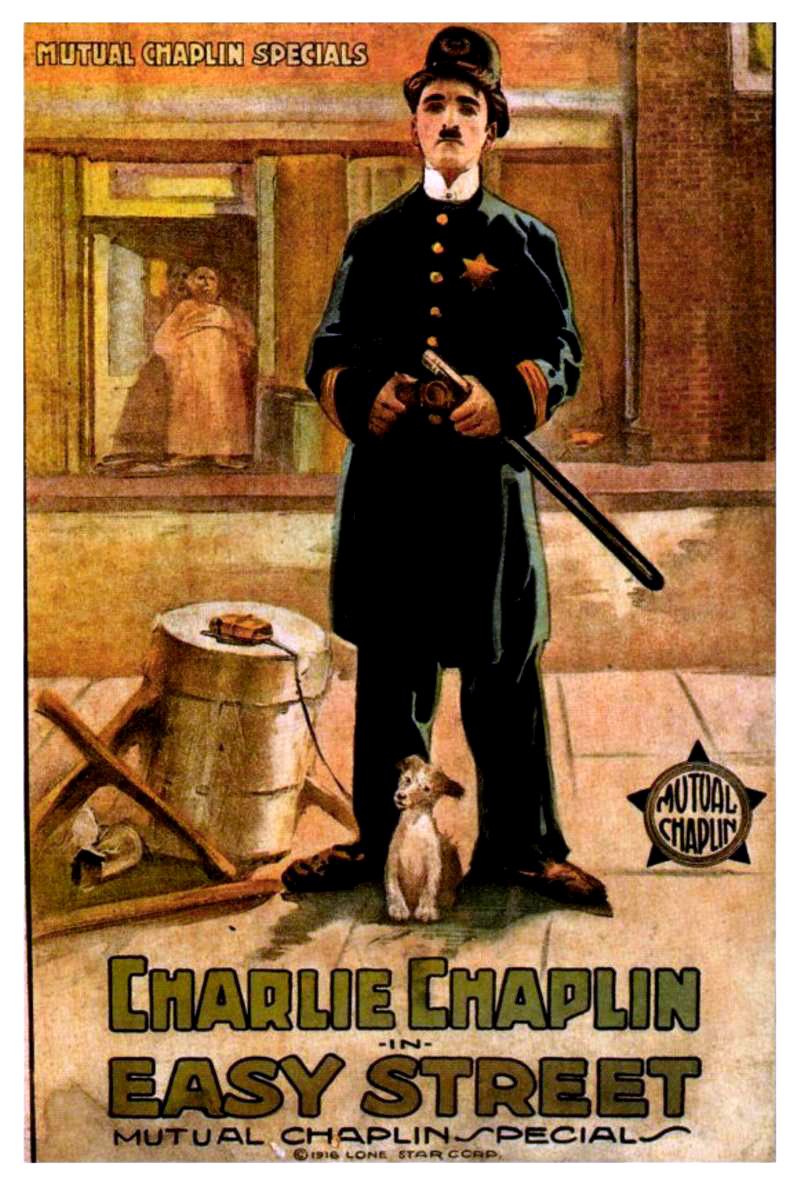
- Directed by: Charlie Chaplin; Edward Brewer (technical director)
- Written by: Charlie Chaplin; Vincent Bryan; Maverick Terrell
- Produced by: Henry P. Caulfield
- Starring: Charlie Chaplin; Edna Purviance; Eric Campbell
- Cinematography: Roland Totheroh; George C. Zalibra
- Edited by: Charlie Chaplin
- Distributed by: Mutual Film Corporation
- Release date: January 22, 1917
- Running time: 19 minutes USA, 24 minutes Germany (restored version)
- Country: United States
- Languages: Silent; English intertitles

Easy Street

Easy Street is a 1917 short action-comedy film starring and directed by Charlie Chaplin.

== Plot ==
In a slum area called Easy Street, the police are failing to maintain law and order.

The Little Tramp, a down-and-out derelict, is sleeping rough outside the Hope Mission near the streets of a lawless slum. The sounds of a service in progress draws him wearily inside. After the sermon from the preacher, he is entranced by a beautiful mission worker and organist and he stays after the service. Holding his hand, she pleads him to join the mission, inspiring his religious "awakening". He vows to reform, returning the collection box that he slipped into capacious pants.

Spotting a help-wanted ad for a job at the police station, the Tramp accepts and is assigned the rough-and-tumble Easy Street as his beat. Upon entering the street he finds a bully roughing up the locals and pilfering their money. The Tramp gets on the wrong side of the bully and after a brief chase, the Tramp finds him impervious to his blows. In a display of his great strength, the bully bends a gas streetlamp in two, whereupon Charlie leaps on his back, covers his head with the lamp, and turns on the gas, rendering him unconscious.

After giving him one more shot of gas, he calls the squad to retrieve the Bully. For the moment, the Tramp becomes the cock-of-the-walk in the locality, frightening away the denizens by simply spinning around to face them. Then he helps a woman (who turns out to be the Bully's wife) who has stolen food from a street vendor but she rather 'rewards' him by nearly dropping a flower pot on his head. The mission worker happens by and takes him across the way to another apartment where a couple has a large brood of children whom Charlie feeds by scattering bread crumbs among them as if he were feeding chickens.

The bully is put in handcuffs by the police but manages to escape from the station and returns to Easy Street. After a battle with his wife, he attacks the Tramp. He chases the Tramp fanatically until he manages to knock the bully unconscious by dropping a heavy stove on his head from a two-story window. On returning to his beat on Easy Street, the unruly mob knocks the Tramp unconscious and drops him into a nearby cellar where he manages to save the Mission worker from a nasty junkie after accidentally sitting on the drug addict's upturned needle. Supercharged by the effects of the drug, he takes on the mob and heroically defeats them all, and as a consequence restores peace and order to Easy Street.

By the end of the film, a New Mission is built on Easy Street and the inhabitants flock to it, even including the former bully: now a well-dressed respectable, churchgoing citizen. Arm in arm, The Derelict and The Mission Worker follow them into the church.

== Cast ==
- Charlie Chaplin ... The Derelict
- Edna Purviance ... The Mission Worker
- Eric Campbell ... The Bully
- Albert Austin ... Minister/Policeman
- Lloyd Bacon ... Drug Addict
- Henry Bergman ... Anarchist
- Frank J. Coleman ... Policeman
- William Gillespie ... Heroin addict
- James T. Kelley ... Mission Visitor/Policeman
- Charlotte Mineau ... Big Eric's Wife
- John Rand ... Mission Tramp/Policeman
- Janet Miller Sully ... Mother in Mission
- Loyal Underwood ... Small Father/Policeman
- Erich von Stroheim Jr. ... Baby
- Leo White ... Policeman (uncredited)
- Tom Wood ... Chief of Police (uncredited)

== Inspiration ==
It could have been inspired by the similarly named East Street market in the Walworth district of London (where Chaplin is believed to have been born), a suggestion made as early as 1928 in the film The Life Story of Charlie Chaplin by Harry B. Parkinson and reasserted in David Robinson's introduction to the most recent edition of My Autobiography, while the famous trousers and boots of Chaplin's trademark tramp costume may have been drawn from the everyday clothes Chaplin saw worn there.

== Reception ==
The Moving Picture World offered the following praise: "In 'Easy Street,' Charlie Chaplin's latest and best, if we may venture to obtrude so decided an opinion, an original key has been struck. At any rate, it is Chaplin at his funniest; and nothing much more entertaining, by way of comedy, could be imagined..."

A reviewer from Variety wrote, "The resultant chaos and several new stunts will be bound to bring the laughter, and the star's display of agility and acrobatics approaches some of the Douglas Fairbanks pranks. Chaplin has always been throwing things in his films, but when he 'eases' a cook stove out of the window onto the head of his adversary on the street below, that pleasant little bouquet adds a new act to his repertoire. Easy Street certainly has some rough work in it--maybe a bit rougher than the others--but it is the kind of stuff that Chaplin fans love. In fact, few who see Easy Street will fail to be furnished with hearty laughter."

== Alternate version ==
An edited version of this film was released as "Charlie On The Beat". It was available in 8mm silent cine format and ran for about 3.5 minutes.

== Sound version ==
In 1932, Amedee Van Beuren of Van Beuren Studios, purchased Chaplin's Mutual comedies for $10,000 each, added music by Gene Rodemich and Winston Sharples and sound effects, and re-released them through RKO Radio Pictures. Chaplin had no legal recourse to stop the RKO release.
