= Albert Austin =

English actor (1882–1953)

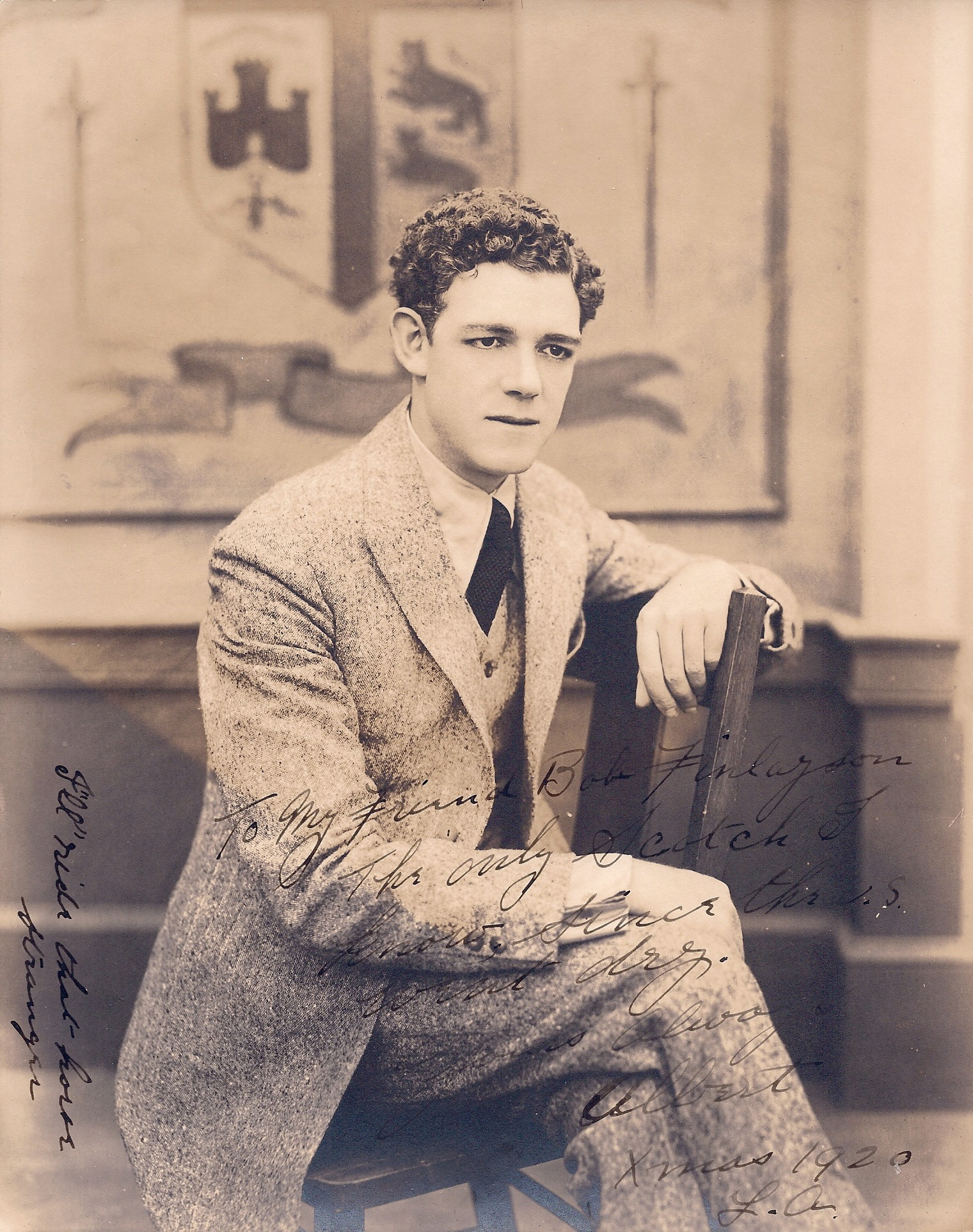
- Albert Austin at United Artists (1920)
- Born: 13 December 1882; Birmingham, Warwickshire, England, UK
- Died: 17 August 1953 (aged 70); North Hollywood, California, US
- Years active: 1912–1931

Albert Austin (13 December 1882 – 17 August 1953) was an English actor, film star, director, and script writer, remembered for his work in Charlie Chaplin films.

== Biography ==
Austin with Charlie Chaplin

Austin was born in Birmingham, Warwickshire, England, and was a music hall performer before going to the United States with Chaplin, both as members of the Fred Karno troupe in 1910.

Known for his painted handlebar moustache and acerbic manner, he worked for Chaplin's stock company and played supporting roles in many of his films, often as a foil to the star and working as his assistant director.

After the development of sound films, he moved into scriptwriting, directing, and acting, chiefly in comedy shorts. Among other things, he assisted Chaplin in developing the plot of The Adventurer (1917). However, he received screen credit as a collaborator only once, for City Lights (1931).

As an actor, he appeared in Chaplin's comedies for the Mutual Film Corporation. Later he had two brief, uncredited roles in one of Chaplin's 'silent' comedies made in the sound era, City Lights. Austin is also seen very briefly (as a cab driver) at the beginning of Chaplin's short film One A.M. (1916). He also appeared in films starring Jackie Coogan and Mack Sennett.

Austin's best known performance may be in Chaplin's short The Pawnshop (1916). Austin enters the shop with an alarm clock, hoping to pawn it. To establish the clock's value, Chaplin dissects it. Austin maintains a deadpan expression as Chaplin progressively destroys his clock, then hands the pieces back to Austin.

He had the leading role in Mary Pickford's Suds (1920), where he co-stars as a customer leaving his shirt at her laundry. In that film, he appears without his comic moustache.

In his final years, he worked as a police officer at the Warner Brothers studios, according to a New York Times obituary. He died on 17 August 1953, and was interred at Grand View Memorial Park Cemetery in Glendale, California.

== Filmography ==
Year	Title	Role	Notes
1915	A Safe Investment	Detective	Short
1916	The Floorwalker	Shop assistant	Short
1916	The Fireman	Fireman	Short
1916	The Vagabond	Trombonist	Short
1916	One A.M.	Taxi Driver	Short
1916	The Count	Tall Guest	Short, Uncredited
1916	The Pawnshop	Client with clock	Short
1916	Behind the Screen	Scene Shifter	Short, Uncredited
1916	The Rink	The Cook / Skater	Short
1917	Easy Street	Minister / Policeman	Short, Uncredited
1917	The Cure	Sanitarium Attendant	Short
1917	The Immigrant	A Diner / An Immigrant	Short
1917	The Adventurer	The Butler	Short
1918	A Dog's Life	Thief / Employment agency clerk Short, Uncredited	
1918	Triple Trouble	Policeman	Short, Uncredited
1918	The Bond	Friend	Short, Uncredited
1918	Shoulder Arms	American Soldier / Clean Shaven German Soldier / Bearded German Soldier / The Kaiser's driver	
1918	How To Make Movies	Golfer / Laboratory Supervisor / The Genie	
1919	The Professor	Man in Flophouse	Short, Uncredited
1920	Suds	Horace Greensmith	
1921	The Kid	Man in Shelter / The Car Thief	
1923	A Prince of a King		Uncredited
1925	The Gold Rush	Prospector	Uncredited
1928	The Circus	Clown	Uncredited
1931	City Lights	Street Sweeper / Burglar	Uncredited, (final film role)
