= Lloyd Bacon =

Actor, director (1889–1955)

- Born: December 4, 1889; San Jose, California, U.S.
- Died: November 15, 1955 (aged 65); Burbank, California, U.S.
- Resting place: Forest Lawn Memorial Park, Hollywood Hills, California
- Education: Santa Clara University
- Occupations: Director, actor, screenwriter
- Years active: 1914–1955
- Spouses: Margaret Adele Lowdermilk; Mary Rubey Cox; Floy Brightwell; Nadine Coughlin

Lloyd Francis Bacon (December 4, 1889 – November 15, 1955) was an American screen, stage, and vaudeville actor and film director. As a director, he made films in numerous genres, including westerns, musicals, comedies, gangster films, and crime dramas. He was one of the directors at Warner Bros. in the 1930s who helped give that studio its reputation for gritty, fast-paced "torn from the headlines" action films. And, in directing Warner Bros.' 42nd Street, he joined the movie's song-and-dance-number director, Busby Berkeley, in contributing to "an instant and enduring classic [that] transformed the musical genre".

== Early life ==
Lloyd Bacon was born on December 4, 1889, in San Jose, California, the son of actor/playwright Frank Bacon - the co-author and star of the long-running Broadway show Lightnin' (1918) – and Jennie Weidman. Lloyd Bacon was not, contrary to some accounts, related to actor Irving Bacon, although he did direct him in a number of his films. Bacon attended Santa Clara University, and would later include highlights from the Bronco Football program in the end of his famous film, Knute Rockne, All American. When America entered the First World War in 1917, Bacon enlisted in the United States Navy, and was assigned to the photographic department. Many of his later films as a director harked back fondly to his time in the Navy.

== Career ==
Bacon started in films as an actor with Charlie Chaplin and Broncho Billy Anderson and appeared in more than 40 total. As an actor, he is best known for supporting Chaplin in such films as The Tramp (1915) and The Champion and Easy Street (1917).

He later became a director and directed over 100 films between 1920 and 1955. He is best known as director of such classics as 42nd Street and Footlight Parade (1933), Ever Since Eve (1937) (from a screenplay by playwright Lawrence Riley et al.), A Slight Case of Murder (1938) with Edward G. Robinson, Invisible Stripes(1939) with George Raft and Humphrey Bogart, 1939's The Oklahoma Kid with James Cagney and Humphrey Bogart, 1940's Knute Rockne, All American with Pat O'Brien and Ronald Reagan (as "the Gipper"), 1943's Action in the North Atlantic with Humphrey Bogart, and 1944's The Fighting Sullivans with Anne Baxter and Thomas Mitchell. He also directed Wake Up and Dream (1946).

== Death ==
Bacon died on November 15, 1955, of a cerebral hemorrhage and was interred in Forest Lawn Memorial Park (Hollywood Hills).

At the time of his death, he was survived by his mother, his widow, Margaret, his ex-wives, son, Frank (1937–2009), daughter, Frances, and a grandchild.

For his contributions to the film industry, Bacon was posthumously inducted into the Hollywood Walk of Fame with a motion pictures star in 1960. His star is located at 7011 Hollywood Boulevard.

== Partial filmography as actor ==
- The Champion (1915)
- A Jitney Elopement (1915)
- The Tramp (1915)
- The Bank (1915)
- The Floorwalker (1916)
- The Fireman (1916)
- The Vagabond (1916)
- Behind the Screen (1916)
- The Rink (1916)
- Easy Street (1917)
- Square Deal Sanderson (1919)
- Wagon Tracks (1919)
- The Blue Bonnet (1919)
- The House of Intrigue (1919)
- The Feud (1919)
- The Midlanders (1920)
- The Girl in the Rain (1920)
- The Broken Gate (1920)
- The Kentucky Colonel (1920)
- The Greater Profit (1921)
- Hearts and Masks (1921)
- Hands Off! (1921)
- Smudge (1922)

== Partial filmography as director ==
- Broken Hearts of Hollywood (1926)
- Private Izzy Murphy (1926)
- The Singing Fool (1928)
- No Defense (1929)
- Kept Husbands (1931)
- 42nd Street (1933)
- Footlight Parade (1933)
- Mary Stevens, M.D. (1933)
- Son of a Sailor (1933)
- Cain and Mabel (1936)
- Sons O' Guns (1936)
- Ever Since Eve (1937)
- Marked Woman (1937)
- San Quentin (1937)
- A Slight Case of Murder (1938)
- Racket Busters (1938)
- The Oklahoma Kid (1939)
- Brother Orchid (1940)
- Knute Rockne, All American (1940)
- Larceny, Inc. (1942)
- Action in the North Atlantic (1943)
- The Fighting Sullivans (1944)
- Wake Up and Dream (1946)
- It Happens Every Spring (1949)
- Golden Girl (1951)
- The French Line (1954)
