= Behind the Screen =

1916 short film by Charlie Chaplin

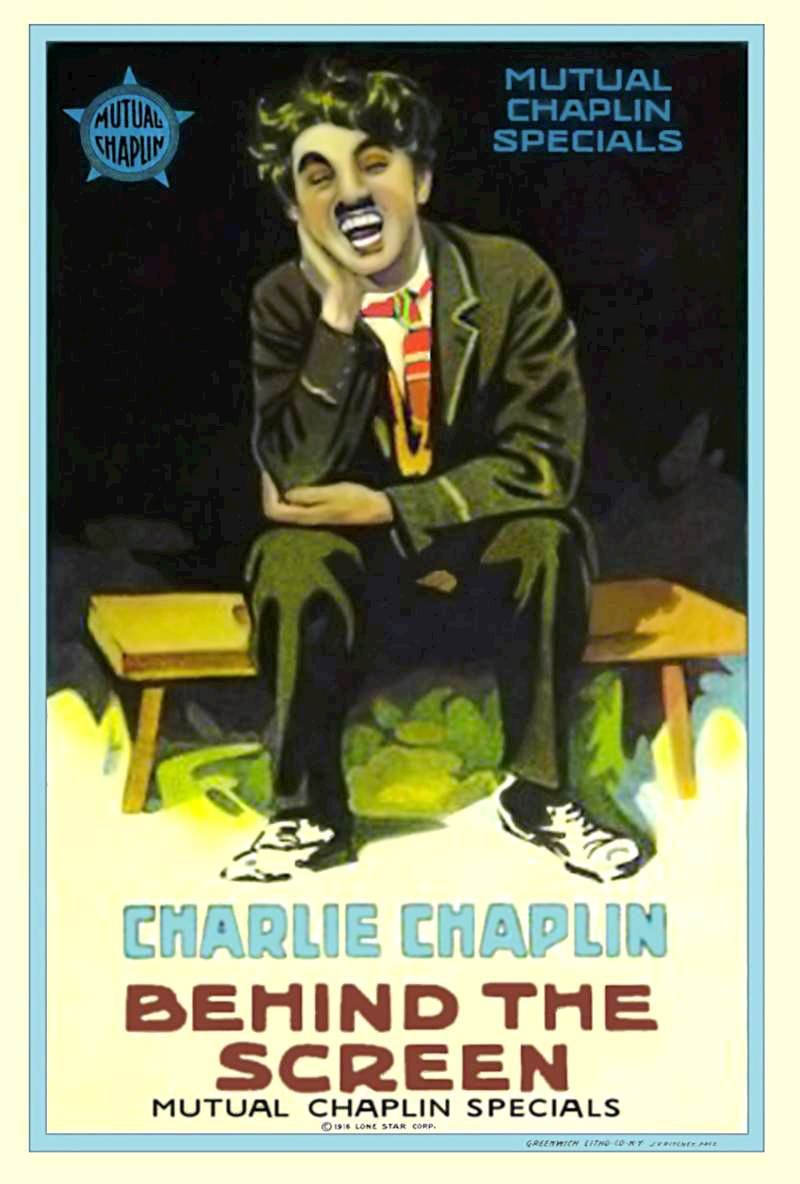
- Theatrical poster to Behind the Screen
- Directed by: Charlie Chaplin; Edward Brewer (technical director)
- Written by: Charlie Chaplin; Vincent Bryan; Maverick Terrell
- Produced by: Henry P. Caulfield
- Starring: Charlie Chaplin; Edna Purviance; Eric Campbell
- Cinematography: Roland Totheroh; George C. Zalibra
- Edited by: Charlie Chaplin
- Distributed by: Mutual Film Corporation
- Release date: November 13, 1916
- Running time: 23 minutes
- Country: United States
- Language: Silent (English intertitles)

Behind the Screen

Behind the Screen is a 1916 American silent short comedy film written by, directed by, and starring Charlie Chaplin, and also starring Eric Campbell and Edna Purviance. Much of the film is slapstick comedy involving Chaplin manhandling large props, mishandling the control to a trap door, and engaging in a raucous pie-throwing fight which spills over into another studio where a period drama is being shot. In one scene Chaplin deftly carries 11 chairs over his back in his left hand and lifts a piano in his right hand.

The film is in the public domain.

== Plot ==
In a silent movie studio, a stagehand named David has an enormous supervisor named Goliath. David is overworked but is still labelled as a loafer by the lazy Goliath and his supervisor. A country girl arrives at the studio in hopes of becoming an actress, but is quickly turned away by Goliath. Most of the other stagehands go on wildcat strike to protest their sleep being interrupted during their lunch break. Only David and Goliath remain on the job. The girl returns and stealthily dresses in one of the striking stagehand's work clothes. Disguised as a man, she gets a job as a stagehand too. David discovers that the new stagehand is actually a female. When he gives her a series of quick kisses, the action is seen by Goliath who makes effeminate gestures at David. Edna overhears the strikers' plans to blow up the studio with dynamite and helps thwart their villainous plot.

== Cast ==
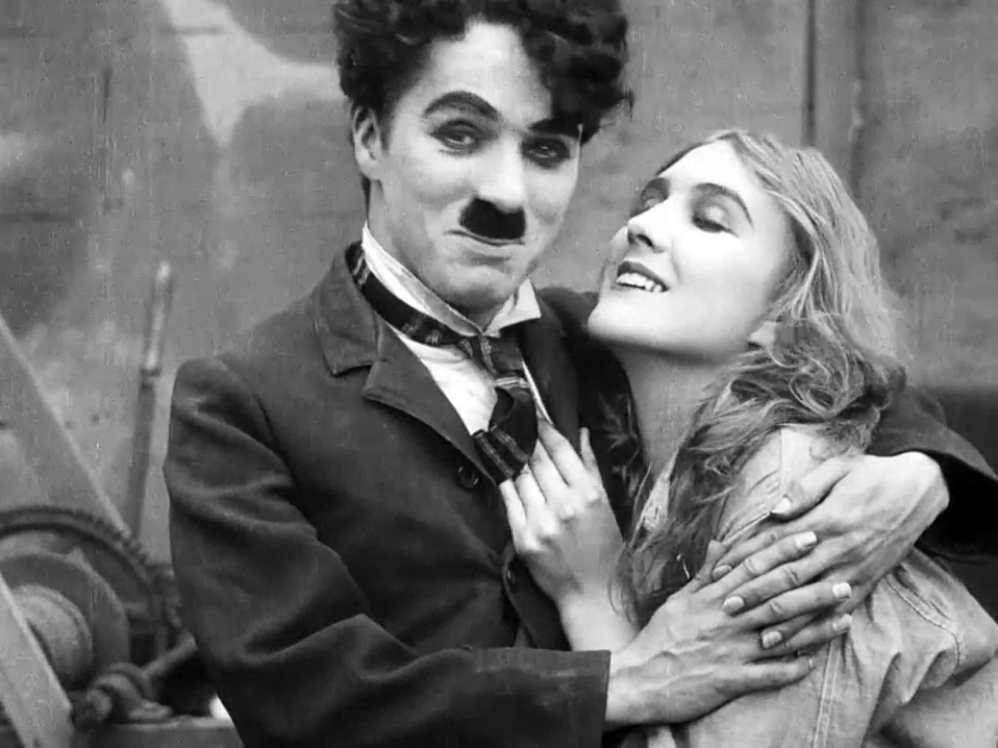
Chaplin and Purviance in the final scene of the film

- Charlie Chaplin as David (Goliath's assistant)
- Edna Purviance as The Girl
- Eric Campbell as Goliath (a stagehand)
- Albert Austin as Stagehand (uncredited)

== Production ==
Behind the Screen was the last of Chaplin's comedies to use a movie studio as a backdrop. Earlier Chaplin films, such as A Film Johnnie, His New Job, and The Masquerader had also been set, at least partly, in a silent movie studio. In Behind the Screen, Chaplin pokes gentle fun at Keystone Studios where he broke into the movies in 1914 and worked under contract for Mack Sennett for a year. The pie-throwing sequence is an obvious allusion to the Keystone style of slapstick comedies where such skirmishes were overly common. One intertitle humorously refers to the pie-throwing gimmick as "a new idea."

== References in documentaries ==
The 1983 documentary series Unknown Chaplin revealed previously unseen footage from this movie, including an alternate take where Purviance's character is shown playing a harp; an outtake in which Edna, playing the guitar, starts laughing (the documentary supports the belief that Purviance and Chaplin were romantically involved at the time); and several takes of a sequence in which Chaplin's character narrowly misses having his feet chopped off by an axe (accomplished by filming the scene backwards) - this sequence was never used in the final film.

The 1995 documentary The Celluloid Closet draws attention to the scene where Chaplin's character - after learning that Purviance's character is really a woman - kisses her while on the set; at this point, a male stagehand enters and, thinking that Chaplin has kissed a man, starts acting in an overtly effeminate way until Chaplin kicks him.

== Review ==
A reviewer for Variety penned, "The latest Charlie Chaplin release is a two-reeler that is to be classed with one of the best laugh-producers that the world's champion high-priced film comic has done for Mutual. Most of the stunts might be classed with the earlier and most successful type of work pulled by Chaplin. Yet not once does he have possession of the bamboo cane nor does he wear that humpty-dumpty derby. The action, which in no case drags, takes place presumably on the floor of a film studio with a large chance for fun with the numerous props."

By contrast, The Moving Picture World gave a less-than-enthusiastic review: " While this Chaplin effort will doubtless evoke much laughter from a certain class of audience, it is not one to be strongly recommended. There is throughout a distinct vein of vulgarity which is unnecessary, even in slapstick comedy. A great deal of comedy is intended to be extracted from a pie slinging episode which occurs during the rehearsal of a couple of scenes in a moving picture studio. The funniest part of the comedy occurs during the manipulation of a trap door in one of the scenes by Chaplin. All of the action takes place in a moving picture studio."

== Sound version ==
In 1932, Amedee Van Beuren of Van Beuren Studios, purchased Chaplin's Mutual comedies for $10,000 each, added music by Gene Rodemich and Winston Sharples and sound effects, and re-released them through RKO Radio Pictures. Chaplin had no legal recourse to stop the RKO release.

== See also ==
- Charlie Chaplin filmography
