= A Woman of Paris =

1923 drama film by Charlie Chaplin

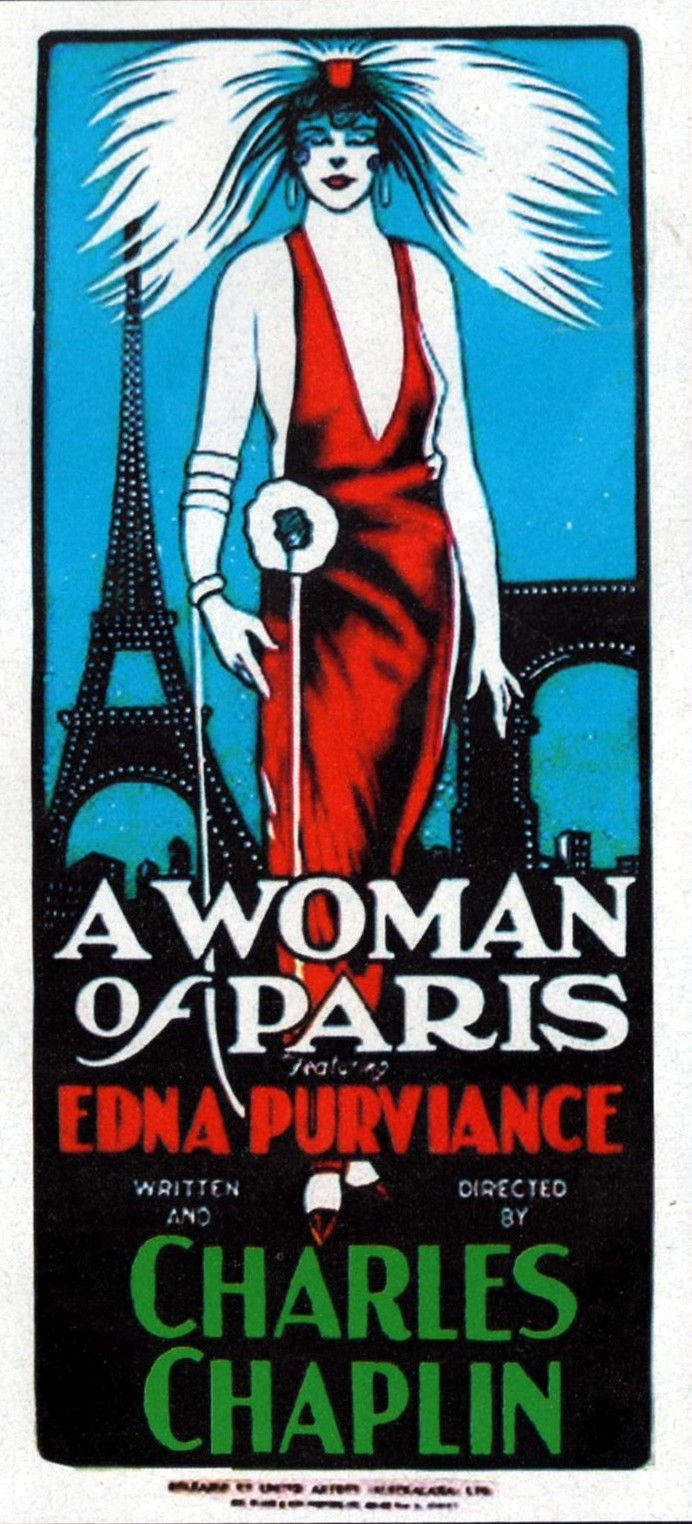
- Long poster
- Directed by: Charlie Chaplin
- Written by: Charlie Chaplin
- Produced by: Charlie Chaplin
- Starring: Edna Purviance; Clarence Geldart; Carl Miller; Lydia Knott; Charles K. French; Adolphe Menjou
- Cinematography: Roland Totheroh; Jack Wilson
- Edited by: Monta Bell; 1976 cut Charlie Chaplin
- Music by: Original score Louis F. Gottschalk; Fritz Stahlberg; 1976 cut Charlie Chaplin; Eric James
- Production companies: Charles Chaplin Productions; Regent
- Distributed by: United Artists
- Release date: September 26, 1923
- Running time: 81 minutes
- Country: United States
- Language: Silent (English intertitles)
- Box office: $634,000 (US/Canada)

A Woman of Paris (also known as A Woman of Paris: A Drama of Fate) is a 1923 silent drama film written, produced, and directed by Charlie Chaplin. It stars Edna Purviance as the title character, along with Clarence Geldart, Carl Miller, Lydia Knott, Charles K. French and Adolphe Menjou. A United Artists production, the film was an atypical dramatic work for Chaplin.

A Woman of Paris was Chaplin's first dedicated attempt at "straight dramatic subject matter" and his only silent film in which he does not appear as a main actor; his next film was the highly acclaimed comedy The Gold Rush (1925). Years later in 1952, he made Limelight which has been both described as "comedy-drama" and a "drama".

== Plot ==
Marie St. Clair and her fiancé, aspiring artist Jean Millet, plan to leave their small French village for Paris, where they will marry. On the night before their scheduled departure, Marie leaves her house for a rendezvous with Jean. Marie's stepfather locks her out of the house, telling her to find shelter elsewhere.

Jean invites Marie to his parents' home, but his father also refuses to let her stay. Jean escorts Marie to the train station, and promises to return after going home to pack. When he arrives at home, he discovers his father has died. When Marie telephones Jean from the station he tells her they must postpone their trip without telling her why. She leaves on the train without him.

A year later in Paris, Marie is enjoying a life of luxury as the mistress of wealthy businessman and philanderer Pierre Revel. A friend calls and invites Marie to a raucous party in the Latin Quarter. She gives Marie the address but cannot remember whether the apartment is in the building on the right or the left. Marie enters the wrong building and is surprised to be greeted by Jean, who shares a modest apartment with his mother. Marie tells Jean she would like for him to paint her portrait and gives him a card with her address.

Jean calls on Marie at her apartment to begin the painting. Marie notices he is wearing a black armband and asks why he is in mourning. Jean tells Marie his father died the night she left without him.

Marie and Jean revive their romance, and Marie distances herself from Pierre Revel. Jean finishes Marie's portrait, but instead of painting her wearing the elegant outfit she chose for the sitting, he paints her in the simple dress she wore on the night she left for Paris.

Jean proposes to Marie. Jean's mother fights with him over the proposal. Marie arrives unexpectedly outside Jean's apartment just in time to overhear Jean pacify his mother, telling her that he proposed in a moment of weakness. Jean fails to convince Marie he did not mean what she overheard, and she returns to Pierre Revel.

The following night, Jean slips a gun into his coat pocket and goes to the exclusive restaurant where Marie and Pierre are dining. Jean and Pierre get into a scuffle, and Jean is ejected from the dining room. Jean shoots himself in the foyer of the restaurant and dies.

The police carry Jean's body to his apartment. Jean's mother retrieves the gun and goes to Marie's apartment, but Marie has gone to Jean's studio. Jean's mother returns and finds Marie sobbing by Jean's body. The two women reconcile and return to the French countryside, where they open a home for orphans in a country cottage.

One morning, Marie and one of the girls in her care walk down the lane to get a pail of milk. Marie and the girl meet a group of sharecroppers who offer them a ride back in their horse-drawn wagon. At the same time, Pierre Revel and another gentleman are riding through the French countryside in a chauffeur-driven automobile. Pierre's companion asks him what had happened to Marie St. Clair. Pierre replies that he does not know. The automobile and the horse-drawn wagon pass each other, heading in opposite directions.

== Cast ==
- Edna Purviance as Marie St. Clair
- Clarence Geldart as Marie's Father
- Carl Miller as Jean Millet
- Lydia Knott as Jean's Mother
- Charles K. French as Jean's Father
- Adolphe Menjou as Pierre Revel
- Betty Morrissey as Fifi
- Malvina Polo as Paulette

Uncredited

- Henry Bergman as Head Waiter
- Charlie Chaplin as Head Porter

== Production ==
A Woman of Paris (1923), full movie

Two things distinguish this film from Chaplin's other work. The most obvious is that he does not appear in the film, at least not in his traditional role of the Tramp. He has a brief cameo as a porter in a train station. This role is inconspicuous and not credited. The other major difference between this and most of Chaplin's other work is that the film is a serious drama. Indeed, "only once did Chaplin depart from his usual form of expression in 1923 with the single dramatic venture, A Woman of Paris.

Edna Purviance plays the lead as Marie St. Clair. One of Chaplin's reasons for producing the film was to help Purviance gain recognition as an actress without Chaplin at her side. Others were because he wanted to stay behind the camera and to make his first real drama. Despite his effort, Purviance did not achieve the level of success that she had in films with Chaplin's Tramp at her side. However, the film did help Adolphe Menjou gain some recognition.

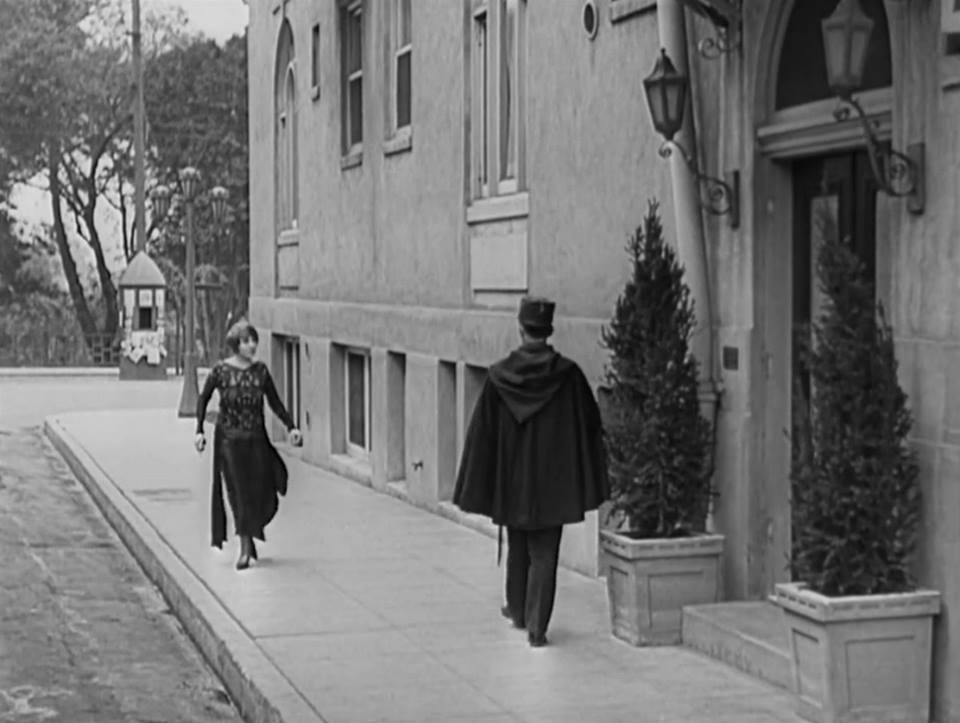
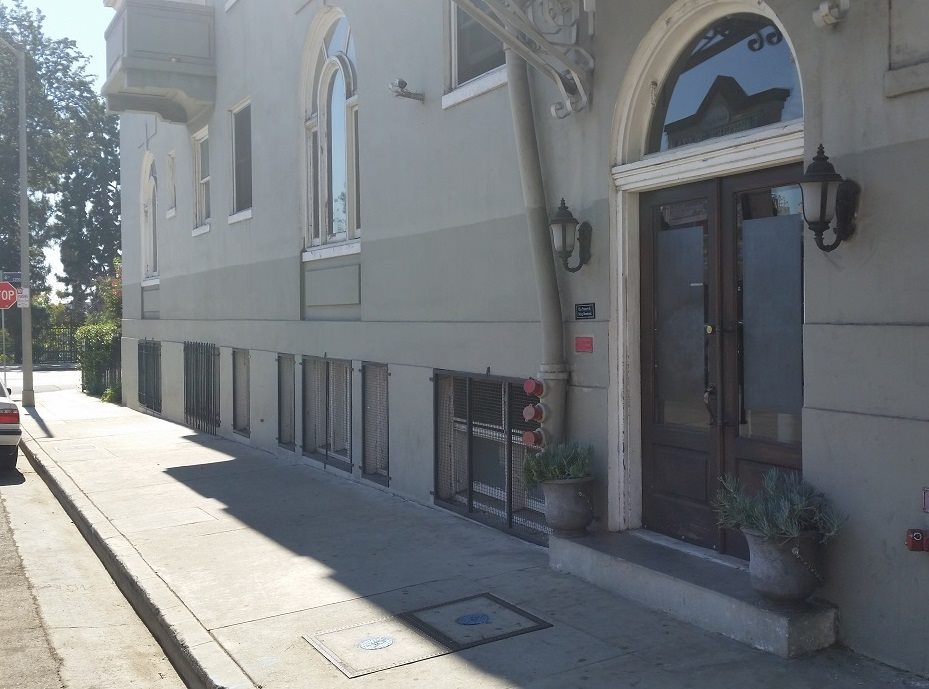
The Ansonia Apartments in Westlake, Los Angeles, above: in the film; below: in 2017

Chaplin and music associate Eric James created a score for a theatrical reissue. Chaplin elected to trim the film (approximately 8 minutes of footage was removed) for the reissue version to further tighten the action. The Museum of Modern Art held the world premiere of A Woman of Paris with Chaplin's new music soundtrack on December 23, 1976. The reissue version was given a theatrical release in 1977.

== Reception ==
=== Contemporary response ===
A Woman of Paris is the first feature Chaplin made with the company he co-founded, United Artists. Upon release A Woman of Paris was not well received by his fans. Chaplin was very popular at the time, and many went to the film expecting to see Chaplin in his traditional comedic role. An attempt was made to ease the public into the idea of Chaplin making a movie without starring in it. At the premiere Chaplin had flyers distributed informing those in line that A Woman in Paris diverged from his normal work, and that he hoped the public would find it enjoyable.

Critical response to the film, on the other hand, was very positive and "generally praised as an outstanding film". The film has been credited with influencing later filmmakers. In particular, the motivations and personalities of its characters had a complexity that was unconventional in the context of early 1920s American cinema.

United Artists producer and screen star Mary Pickford declared it a favorite:

Woman of Paris allows us to think for ourselves and does not constantly underestimate our intelligence. It is a gripping human story throughout and the director allows the situations to play themselves. The actors simply react the emotions of the audience...Charlie Chaplin is the greatest director of the screen...He's a pioneer. How he knows women!—oh, how he knows women! I do not cry easily when seeing a picture, but after seeing Charlie's A Woman of Paris I was all choked up—I wanted to go out in the garden and have it out by myself.

A Woman of Paris, like other films at that time, was subject to censorship by state and local boards. For example, the Pennsylvania State Board of Censors found the film acceptable only with revisions, and, even though Massachusetts passed the film, the local board of Worcester banned the film as being "morally objectionable."

=== Later assessments ===
Chaplin biographer Jeffrey Vance champions A Woman of Paris and writes at length in Chaplin: Genius of the Cinema of the film's importance. Vance notes:

Most examinations of A Woman of Paris select a key scene such as Marie on the train platform or Pierre removing a handkerchief from Marie’s dresser drawer, or the natural and simple approach to performance as the basis of the film's critical laurels, while overlooking Chaplin's overall construction of the visual narrative. However, the film's greatness is not limited to a few isolated scenes. Chaplin's directorial skill and the film's power are demonstrated in the careful and direct way that Chaplin tells a simple story. Chaplin achieved his purpose of conveying 'psychology by subtle action' throughout the visual narrative by imbuing the décor with symbolism, by using objects for their metaphoric and metonymic value, and by parallel storytelling and editing.

Historian Lewis Jacobs reminds viewers that the full title of the film is A Woman of Paris: A Drama of Fate. As such, "the treatment of the story eliminated the moral tone that such a story would be expected to have. Chaplin called it a 'drama of fate': in it he tried to show the influence of circumstances upon people." Critic James R. Quirk in Photoplay (September 1923), noted that Chaplin achieves this through "an unrelenting realism that makes each incident seem inevitable." The movie has a 94% rating on Rotten Tomatoes based on 16 reviews as of 2025.

Chaplin comments upon the institution of marriage, questioning the mainstream view that it was a social blessing. When Marie tells her lover that she hopes for domestic security so as to raise a family, Pierre points out the window to the city street and a sordid tableau: an impoverished family trods past, the mother slapping a child, the father carrying a heavy burden and more children trailing behind the parents.

== Influence ==
"It is upon A Woman of Paris that Chaplin's reputation as a great director has often been wrongly based. In direction the film was neither brilliant nor remarkable, though many claimed it to be both. Its style was elementary, [lacking] any unusual insight regarding movie continuity. The film's interest lay in psychological portraiture, in its honesty in depicting character, environment and human relationships…" - Film historian Lewis Jacobs in The Rise of the American Film: Experimental Cinema in America, 1921-1947 (1967)

The film has been credited with influencing later filmmakers. In particular, the motivations and personalities of its characters had a complexity that was unconventional in the context of early 1920s American cinema.

Historian Lewis Jacobs observes that A Woman of Paris inspired director Ernst Lubitsch's The Marriage Circle (1924), which, in turn influenced "dozens of other films." In A Woman of Paris, and other films of this genre, "the harlot and the adventuress were no longer hussies but women to esteem and emulate."

== Bibliography ==
- Vance, Jeffrey. 2003. Chaplin: Genius of the Cinema. Abrams Books, New York. ISBN 9780810945326.
- Jacobs, Lewis. 1967. The Rise of the American Film: Experimental Cinema in America, 1921-1947. Teachers College Press, Teacher's College, Columbia University, New York. Library of Congress Catalog Number: 6825845.
- Kiernan, Heather. 1999. Introduction to Charlie Chaplin: Intimate Close-ups. The Scarecrow Press, Lanham, Maryland. Heather Kiernan, editor. ISBN 1578860040.
