= Roland Totheroh =

American cinematographer

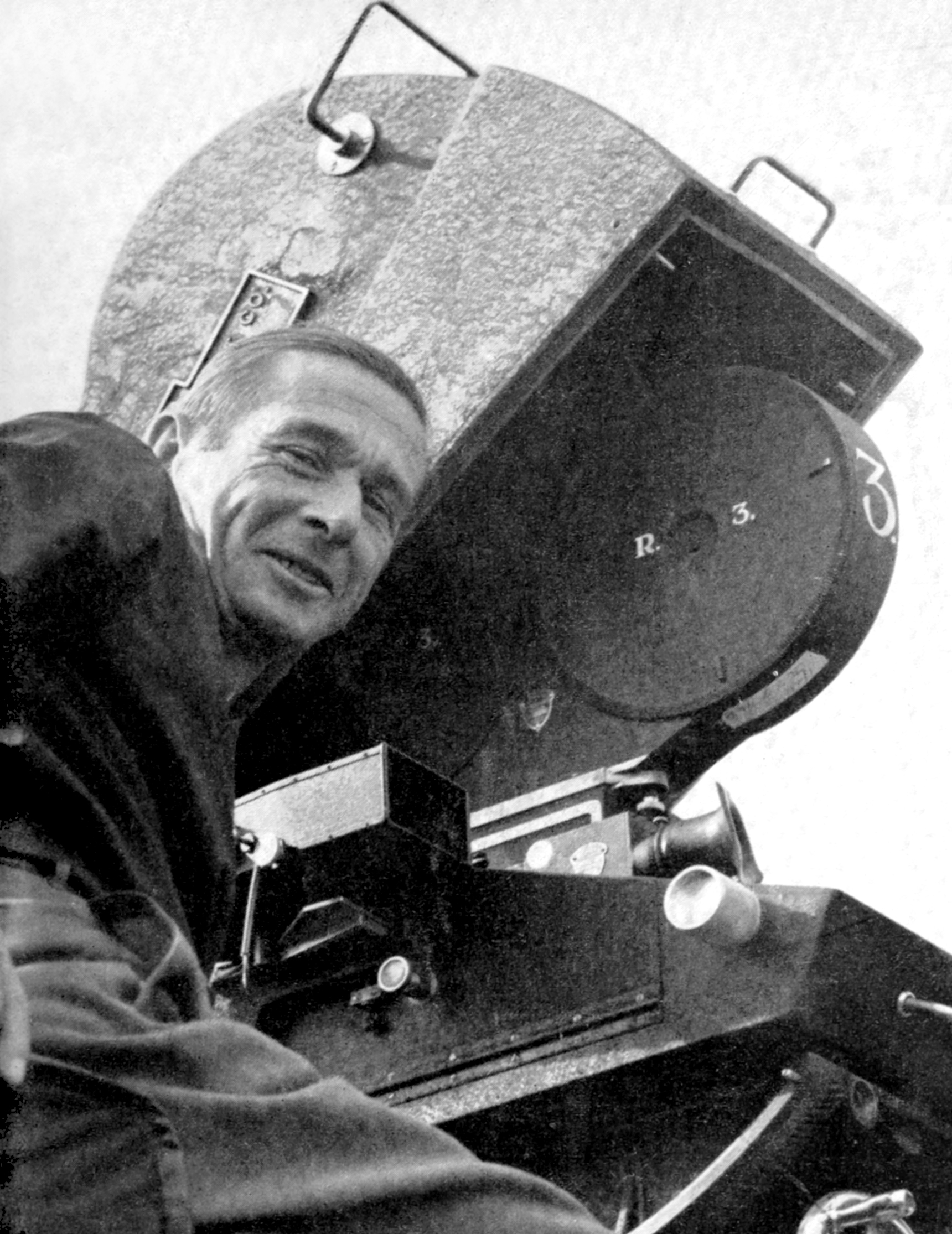
- Totheroh at work on The Great Dictator
- Born: Roland Herbert Totheroh; November 29, 1890; San Francisco, California, U.S.
- Died: June 18, 1967 (aged 76); Los Angeles, California, U.S.
- Resting place: Valhalla Memorial Park Cemetery
- Occupation: Cinematographer
- Children: Jack Totheroh
- Parents: John Edgar Totheroh (father); Emma Gertrude Ashman (mother)
- Relatives: Dan Totheroh

Roland Herbert Totheroh (November 29, 1890 – June 18, 1967) was an American cinematographer most notable for being the regular cameraman on the films of Charlie Chaplin. He worked with Chaplin from 1915 until the 1940s in over 30 films. He was often billed as Rollie Totheroh.

== Biography ==
He was born in San Francisco, California, on November 29, 1890, to John Edgar Totheroh and Emma Gertrude Ashman. His brother was the writer Dan Totheroh (1894–1976). He began his film career at the Essanay Film Manufacturing Company. He married and had a son, actor Jack Totheroh (1914–2011). He died on June 18, 1967, in Los Angeles, California.

== Legacy ==
Totheroh was portrayed in the film Chaplin by David Duchovny.

== Selected filmography ==
* indicates a non-Chaplin film.

- The Floorwalker (1916 short) (with William C. Foster)
- The Fireman (1916 short) (with William C. Foster)
- The Vagabond (1916 short) (with William C. Foster)
- One A.M. (1916 short) (with William C. Foster)
- The Count (1916 short) (with George C. Zalibra)
- The Pawnshop (1916 short) (with William C. Foster)
- Behind the Screen (1916 short) (with George C. Zalibra)
- The Rink (1916 short) (with George C. Zalibra)
- Easy Street (1917 short) (with George C. Zalibra)
- The Cure (1917 short) (with George C. Zalibra)
- The Immigrant (1917 short) (with George C. Zalibra)
- The Adventurer (1917 short) (with George C. Zalibra)
- A Dog's Life (1918 short)
- Shoulder Arms (1918 short)
- Sunnyside (1919 short)
- The Professor (1919 unfinished short)
- A Day's Pleasure (1919 short)
- The Kid (1921)
- The Idle Class (1921 short)
- Pay Day (1922 short)
- A Woman of Paris (1923) (with Jack Wilson)
- The Gold Rush (1925)
- The Circus (1928)
- City Lights (1931) (with Gordon Pollock)
- Modern Times (1936) (with Ira H. Morgan)
- The Great Dictator (1940) (with Karl Struss)
- Monsieur Verdoux (1947) (with an uncredited Curt Courant)
- Song of My Heart* (1948)
- Limelight (1952) (credited to Karl Struss; "photographic consultant" only)
