= The Professor (1919 film) =

1919 film by Charlie Chaplin

- Directed by: Charlie Chaplin
- Written by: Charlie Chaplin
- Produced by: Charles D. Hall
- Starring: Charlie Chaplin; Albert Austin; Henry Bergman; Loyal Underwood; Tom Wilson
- Cinematography: Roland Totheroh
- Distributed by: First National
- Release date: 1919
- Running time: 7 minutes
- Country: United States
- Languages: Silent film English (Original titles)

The Professor is a 1919 American silent comedy film made at the Chaplin Studios for the First National film company starring Charlie Chaplin. However, the film was never released or even completed. Chaplin abandoned production after finishing only one sequence: a single reel. Chaplin appears not as his usual Tramp character but as "Professor Bosco", a slovenly showman who brings his flea circus with him when staying at a flophouse. The fleas get loose during the night and create havoc.

The surviving film is included in Unknown Chaplin and on the Criterion Collection Limelight Blu-ray and DVD release.

== Cast ==
- Charlie Chaplin - Professor Bosco
- Albert Austin - Man in flophouse
- Henry Bergman - Bearded man in flophouse
- Loyal Underwood - Flophouse proprietor
- Tom Wilson - Man in flophouse
- Tom Wood - Fat man in flophouse

== See also ==
- List of American films of 1919
- Her Friend the Bandit - a 1914 lost film co-directed by Chaplin and Mabel Normand.
