= The Circus (1928 film) =

1928 film by Charlie Chaplin

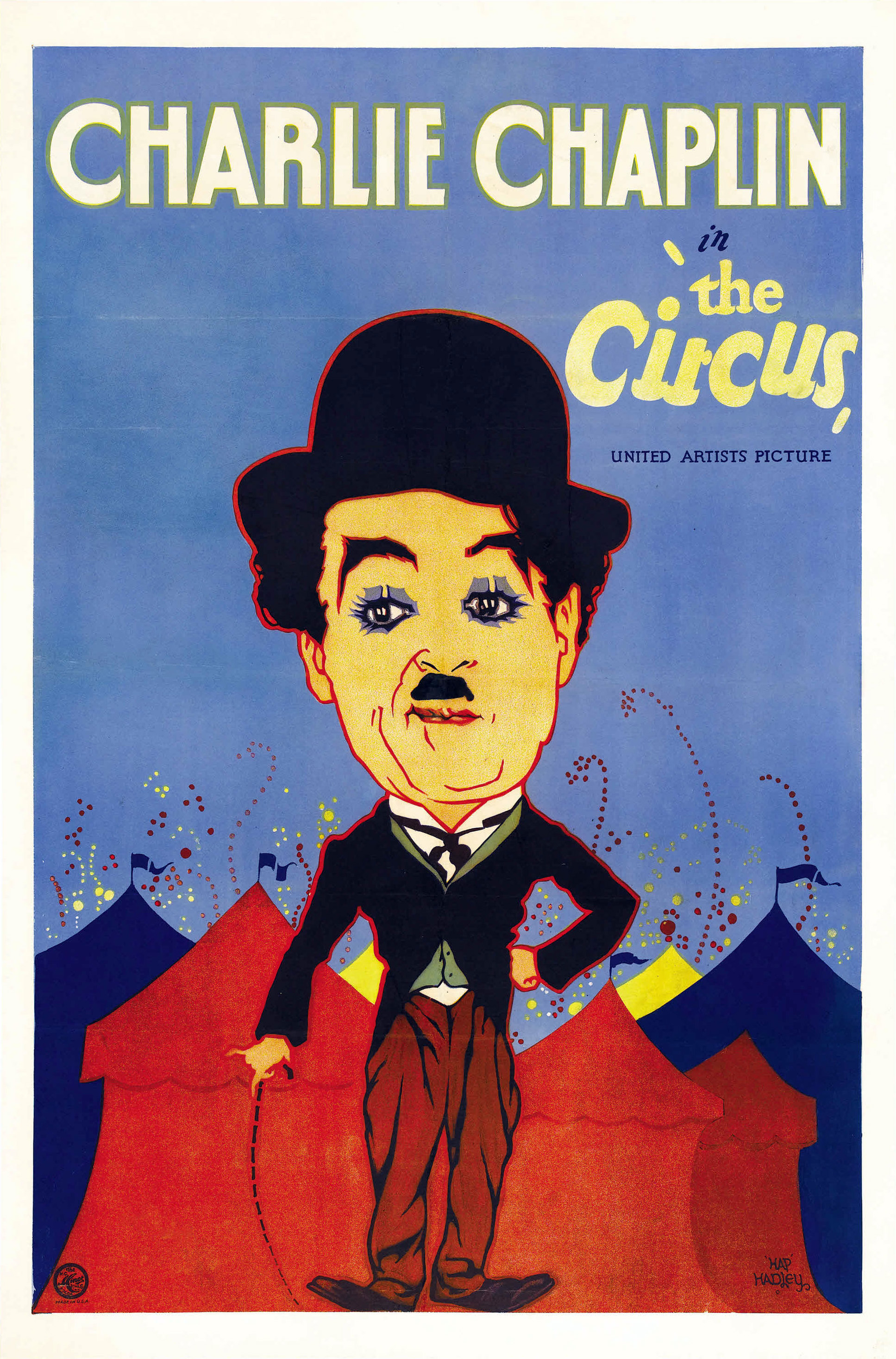
- Original US poster by Alvan "Hap" Hadley
- Directed by: Charlie Chaplin
- Written by: Charlie Chaplin
- Produced by: Charlie Chaplin
- Starring: Charlie Chaplin; Al Ernest Garcia; Merna Kennedy; Henry Bergman
- Cinematography: Roland Totheroh
- Music by: Arthur Kay (1928 version); Charlie Chaplin (1967 version)
- Distributed by: United Artists
- Release dates: January 6, 1928 (New York); January 27, 1928 (Los Angeles)
- Running time: 72 minutes
- Country: United States
- Languages: Silent film English intertitles
- Box office: $3.8 million (worldwide rentals)

The Circus is a 1928 silent romantic comedy film written, produced, and directed by Charlie Chaplin. The film stars Chaplin, Al Ernest Garcia, Merna Kennedy, Harry Crocker, George Davis and Henry Bergman. The ringmaster of an impoverished circus hires Chaplin's Little Tramp as a clown, but discovers that he can only be funny unintentionally.

The production of the film was the most difficult experience in Chaplin's career. Numerous problems and delays occurred, including a studio fire, the death of Chaplin's mother, as well as Chaplin's bitter divorce from his second wife Lita Grey, and the Internal Revenue Service's claims of Chaplin's owing back taxes, all of which culminated in filming being stalled for eight months. The Circus was the seventh-highest-grossing silent film in cinema history, taking in more than $3.8 million in 1928. The film continues to receive high praise. The film's copyright was renewed, so it entered the public domain on January 1, 2024.

== Plot ==
The Circus (1928) by Charlie Chaplin

At a circus midway, the penniless and hungry Tramp is mistaken for a pickpocket and chased by both the police and the real crook (the latter having stashed a stolen wallet and watch in the Tramp's pocket to avoid detection). Running away, the Tramp stumbles into the middle of a performance and unknowingly becomes the hit of the show.

The ringmaster/proprietor of the struggling circus gives him a tryout the next day, but the Tramp fails miserably. However, when the property men quit because they have not been paid, he gets hired on the spot to take their place. Once again, he inadvertently creates comic mayhem during a show. The ringmaster craftily hires him as a poorly paid property man who is always stationed in the performance area of the big top tent so he can unknowingly improvise comic material.

The Tramp befriends Merna, a horse rider who is treated badly by her ringmaster stepfather. She later informs the Tramp that he is the star of the show, forcing the ringmaster to pay him accordingly. With the circus thriving because of him, the Tramp also is able to secure better treatment for Merna.

After overhearing a fortune teller inform Merna that she sees "love and marriage with a dark, handsome man who is near you now", the overjoyed Tramp buys a ring from another clown. Alas for him, she meets Rex, the newly hired tightrope walker. The Tramp eavesdrops as she rushes to tell the fortune teller that she has fallen in love with the new man. With his heart broken, the Tramp is unable to entertain the crowds. After several poor performances, the ringmaster warns him he has only one more chance.

When Rex cannot be found for a performance, the ringmaster (knowing that the Tramp has been practicing the tightrope act in hopes of supplanting his rival) sends the Tramp out in his place. Despite a few mishaps, including several mischievous escaped monkeys, he manages to survive the experience and receives much applause from the audience. However, when he sees the ringmaster slapping Merna around afterward, he beats the man and is fired.

Merna runs away to join him. The Tramp finds and brings Rex back with him to marry Merna. The trio go back to the circus. The ringmaster starts berating his stepdaughter, but stops when Rex informs him that she is his wife. When the traveling circus leaves, the Tramp remains behind. He picks himself up and starts walking jauntily away.

== Cast ==
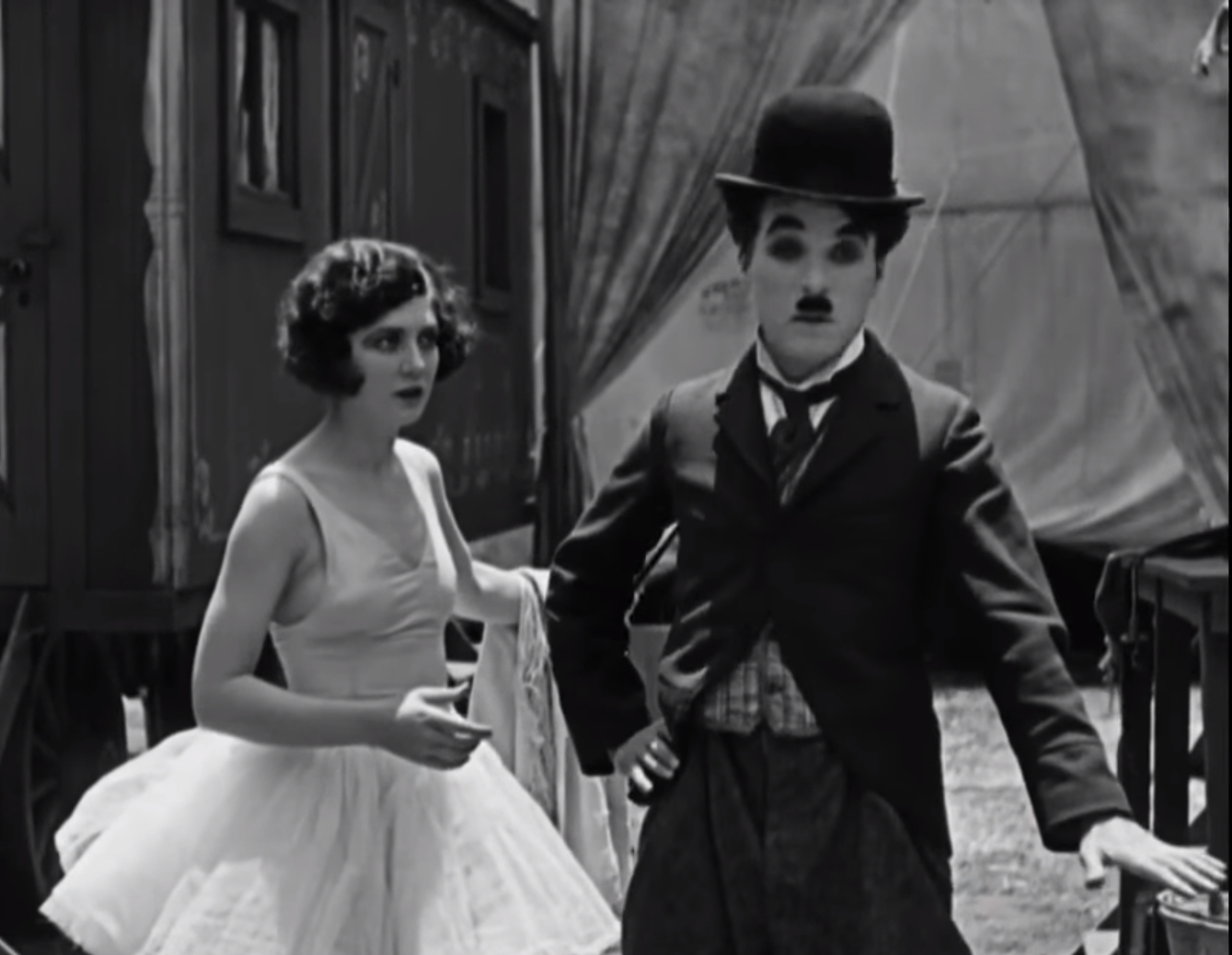
Charlie Chaplin and Merna Kennedy

- Charlie Chaplin as The Tramp
- Al Ernest Garcia as The Circus Proprietor and Ringmaster [credited as Allan Garcia]
- Merna Kennedy as The Ringmaster's Step-daughter, a Circus Rider
- Harry Crocker as Rex, a Tight Rope Walker (also a disgruntled property man and a clown)
- George Davis as a Magician
- Henry Bergman as an Old Clown
- Tiny Sandford as The Head Property Man [credited as Stanley J. Sandford]
- John Rand as an Assistant Property Man (also a clown)
- Steve Murphy as a Pickpocket

== Production ==
=== Development ===
Chaplin first began discussing his ideas for a film about a circus as early as 1920. In late 1925, he returned from New York to California and began working on developing the film at Charlie Chaplin Studios. Set designer Danny Hall sketched out Chaplin's early ideas for the film, with Chaplin returning to one of his older films, The Vagabond (1916), and drawing upon similar story ideas and themes for The Circus. Chaplin was a long time admirer of French comedian Max Linder, who had died in October 1925, and often borrowed gags and plot devices from Linder's films. Some critics have pointed out the similarities between The Circus and Linder's last completed film The King of the Circus (1924 film).

=== Filming ===
Filming began on January 11, 1926, and the majority was completed by November. After the first month of filming, it was discovered that the film negative had been scratched; restoration work was able to eventually adjust the negative. A major fire broke out at Chaplin's studios in September, delaying production for a month. Chaplin was served with divorce papers by Lita Grey in December, and litigation delayed the release of the film for another year.

== Release ==
The Circus finally premiered in New York City on January 6, 1928, at the Strand Theatre, and in Los Angeles on January 27 at the Grauman's Chinese Theatre. It came right at the beginning of the sound film era, with the very first feature sound film, The Jazz Singer (1927), having been released just months earlier.

Chaplin composed a new score for the film in 1967, and this new version of the film (see below) was copyrighted in 1968 to "The Roy Export Company Establishment" and released in 1969.

== Reception ==
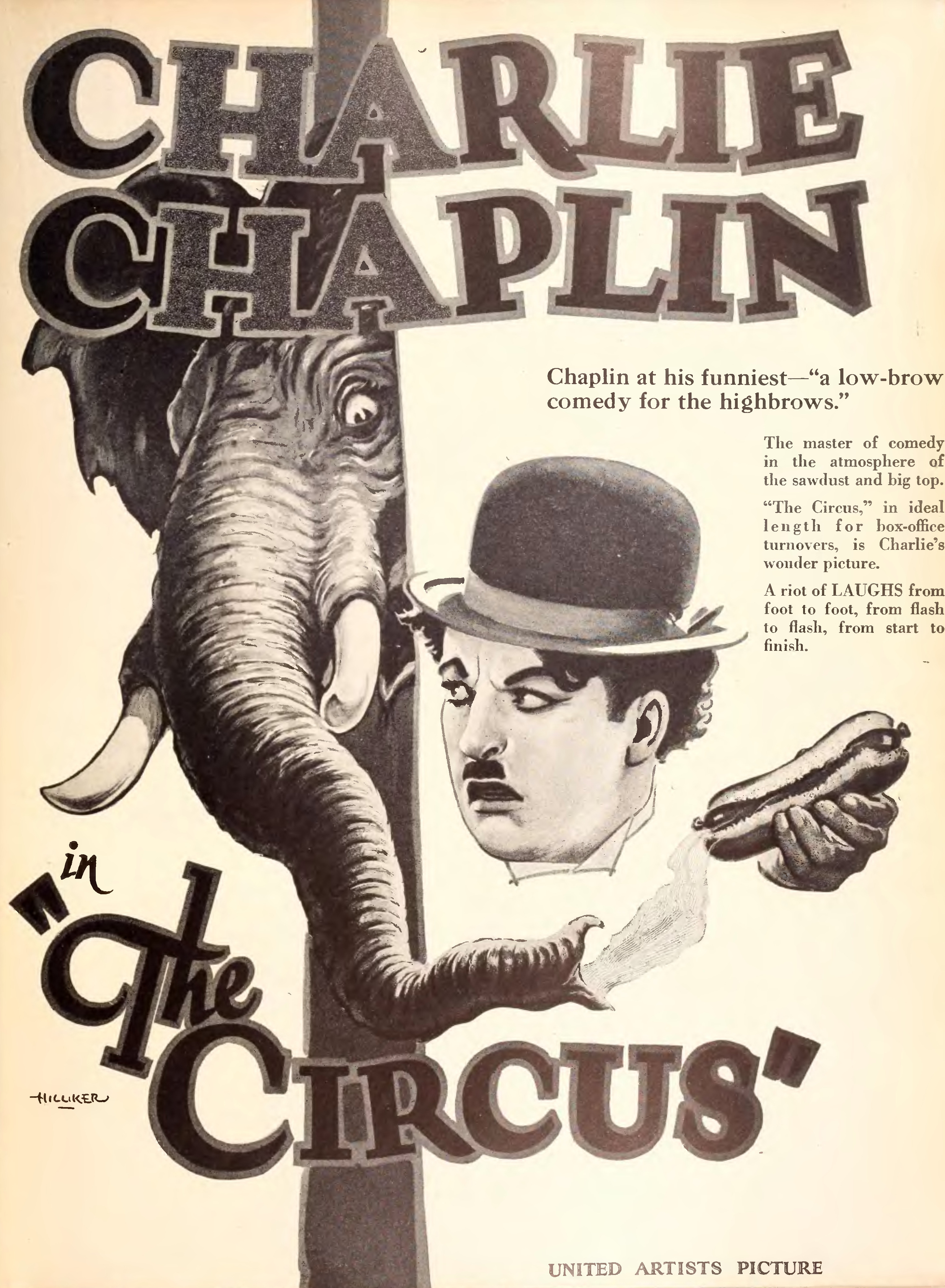
Advertisement from 1927 Motion Picture News

The Circus was well received by audiences and critics, and while its performance at the box office was good, it earned less than The Gold Rush (1925). In North America, the film earned $1,820,000 in domestic theatrical rentals. Some critics consider it and The Gold Rush to be Chaplin's two best comedies.

In The New York Times, Mordaunt Hall reported that it was "likely to please intensely those who found something slightly wanting in The Gold Rush, but at the same time it will prove a little disappointing to those who reveled in the poetry, the pathos and fine humor of his previous adventure." Hall went on to write that there were passages "that are undoubtedly too long and others that are too extravagant for even this blend of humor. But Chaplin's unfailing imagination helps even when the sequence is obviously slipping from grace."

Variety ran a very positive review, stating that "For the picture patrons, all of them, and for broad, laughable fun – Chaplin's best. It's Charlie Chaplin's best fun maker for other reasons: because it is the best straightaway story he has employed for broad film making, and because here his fun stuff is nearly all entirely creative or original in the major point."

Commenting on the long wait for the film's release, Film Daily wrote that "it was worth it, for, if you are prone to favor superlatives here is an opportunity to coin several fresh ones" and that Chaplin was "as inimitable today as he was in the days of his two-reelers."

In The New Yorker, Oliver Claxton wrote that the film was "a little disappointing. There are one or two moments when it is very funny, but there are long stretches when it is either mild or dull."

== Analysis ==
Film historian Jeffrey Vance views The Circus as an autobiographical metaphor:

He joins the circus and revolutionizes the cheap little knockabout comedy among the circus clowns, and becomes an enormous star. But by the end of the movie, the circus is packing up and moving on without him. Chaplin's left alone in the empty circus ring... It reminds me of Chaplin and his place in the world of the cinema. The show is moving on without him. He filmed that sequence four days after the release of The Jazz Singer (the first successful talkie) in New York. When he put a score to The Circus in 1928, Chaplin scored that sequence with "Blue Skies", the song Jolson had made famous, only Chaplin played it slowly and sorrowfully, like a funeral dirge.

In his commentary track for the Criterion Collection home video release of the film, Vance notes:

Chaplin—a great cinema auteur—revealed his innermost feelings through his films. In The Circus, he fashioned a scenario that places The Tramp within the confines of a circus and, in so doing, documents, celebrates, and memorializes his own position as the greatest clown of his time. And, that accomplishment—beyond the wonderful comedy—ranks The Circus a major Chaplin film of considerable importance.

== Musical rescoring ==
In 1947, Hanns Eisler worked on music for the film. Eisler then used the music he composed for his Septet No. 2 ("Circus") for flute and piccolo, clarinet in B flat, bassoon, and string quartet. Eisler's sketch of scene sequences and rhythms is in the Hans Eisler Archive in Berlin.

In 1967, Chaplin composed a new musical score for the film and a recording of him singing "Swing Little Girl" playing over the opening credits. A new version of the film opened in New York on December 15, 1969, with the new score. See also: It was released in London in December 1970.

== Awards ==
Charlie Chaplin was originally nominated for three Academy Awards, but the Academy took Chaplin out of the running by giving him a Special Award "for writing, acting, directing and producing The Circus". The Academy no longer lists Chaplin's nominations in their official list of nominees, although most unofficial lists include him.

Academy Award	Nominee
Best Director, Comedy Picture	Charlie Chaplin
Best Actor	Charlie Chaplin
Best Writing (Original Story)	Charlie Chaplin

== Home media ==
The Circus was released on Blu-ray and DVD by the Criterion Collection in 2019, which includes trailers of the film, archival footage from the production, and an audio commentary track by Chaplin biographer Jeffrey Vance.

== Preservation ==
The Academy Film Archive preserved The Circus in 2002.

== Sources ==
- Crafton, Donald (1999). "The Uncertainty of Sound". The Talkies: American Cinema's Transition to Sound, 1926–1931. Vol. 4. University of California Press. ISBN 0-520-22128-1.
- Encyclopedia of World Biography (2004). "Charles Spencer Chaplin". Encyclopedia of World Biography. Vol. 3 (2nd ed.). Gale.
- Flom, Eric L. (1997). Chaplin in the Sound Era: An Analysis of the Seven Talkies. McFarland. ISBN 0-7864-0325-X.
- Krafsur, Richard (1997). Krafsur, Richard P. (ed.). The American Film Institute Catalog of Motion Pictures Produced in the United States: Feature Films, 1961–1970, Part 2. University of California Press. ISBN 0-520-20970-2.
- Lynn, Kenneth Schuyler (1997). Charlie Chaplin and his Times. Simon and Schuster. ISBN 0-684-80851-X.
- Maland, Charles J. (1991). Chaplin and American Culture: The Evolution of a Star Image. Princeton University Press. ISBN 0-691-02860-5.
- Maland, Charles J. (1989). Chaplin and American Culture: The Evolution of a Star Image. Princeton University Press. ISBN 0-691-09440-3. "The United Artists balance sheet of domestic film rentals through the end of 1931 show that The Gold Rush had accumulated $2.15 million in rentals, while The Circus had garnered $1.82 million."
- Milton, Joyce (1998). Tramp: The Life of Charlie Chaplin. Da Capo Press. p. 256. ISBN 0-306-80831-5.
- Mitchell, Glenn (1997). The Chaplin Encyclopedia. B.T. Batsford Ltd. ISBN 0-7134-7938-8.
- Niklew, Christiane; Reinhold, Daniela; Rienäcker, Helgard (1998) [1984]. "Inventar der Musikautographe im Hanns-Eisler-Archiv" [Inventory of the autographs in the Hanns-Eisler-Archive]. In Maren Köster (ed.). Hanns Eisler – 's müßt dem Himmel Höllenangst werden (in German). Stiftung Archiv der Akademie der Künste. ISBN 3923997833.
- Vance, Jeffrey (2003). Chaplin: Genius of the Cinema. Harry N. Abram. ISBN 0-8109-4532-0.
