= Eric Campbell (actor) =

Scottish actor

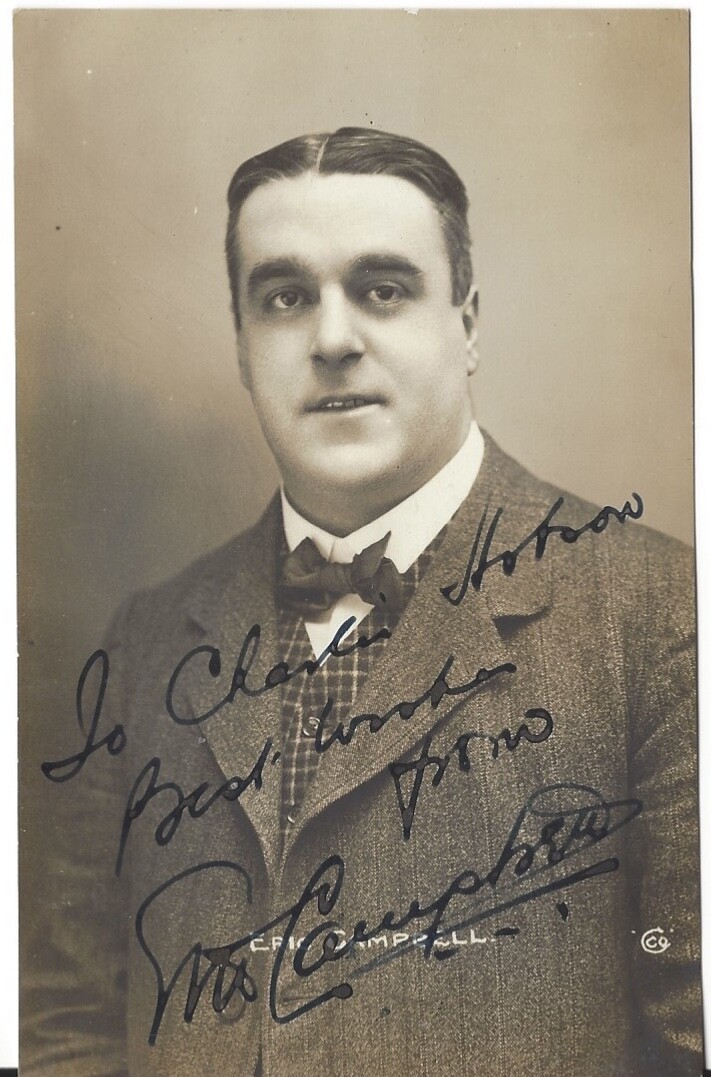
- Born: 26 April 1879; Sale, Cheshire (now Greater Manchester), England
- Died: 20 December 1917 (aged 38); Los Angeles, California, United States
- Years active: 1916–1917
- Height: 6 ft 5 in (196 cm)
- Spouse(s): Fanny Gertrude Robotham (1901–1917); Pearl Gillman (1917)

Alfred Eric Campbell (26 April 1879 – 20 December 1917) was an English actor. He was a key member of Charlie Chaplin's film ensemble, invariably playing an intimidating bully, and appeared in eleven of Chaplin's films before he was killed in a car crash at the age of 38. He is the subject of a 1996 documentary by filmmaker Kevin Macdonald.

== Career ==
Campbell began acting in "fit-ups" (local theatres) in Scotland and Wales, playing melodramatic roles. In this setting he was discovered by Fred Karno, the English impresario who was impressed by Campbell's size and baritone voice and took him to London to act in the slapstick comedy style.

Campbell travelled to New York in 1914, following Chaplin and his then understudy Stan Laurel, who had moved there in 1913. Campbell soon became established in America as a stage actor. In 1916 Chaplin, in New York to sign his contract with Mutual, saw Campbell in a play on Broadway. Subsequently, Chaplin invited him to Hollywood to join the cast of actors for the 12 Mutual films Chaplin had contracted to make.

Campbell's first film with Chaplin was The Floorwalker (1916). In it he achieved recognition for the "escalator scene", in which he chased Chaplin through a department store. It was in their second film together, The Fireman (1916), that Campbell developed the role which featured in all his work with Chaplin. A tall man towering 6 ft. 5 in.(1.96 m.) and weighing almost 300 pounds (136 kg), he became the bully and comic foil to the Little Tramp's antics. His best role is probably in Easy Street (1917), in which, as a brutal bully, he bends a cast-iron street lamp standard to a right angle to intimidate the policeman played by Chaplin. Campbell perfected his fiercely menacing eye make-up when performing in Gilbert and Sullivan's The Mikado prior to entering the movie industry.

Chaplin was then the highest-profile film star in the world, with many imitators. Campbell also had imitators, including Oliver Hardy who played second banana to Chaplin's impersonator, Billy West.

When Chaplin's contract with Mutual ended, he signed another with First National, intending to take Campbell with him. Between films, Chaplin lent Campbell to Mary Pickford, who cast him in Amarilly of Clothes-Line Alley (1918).

== Personal life ==
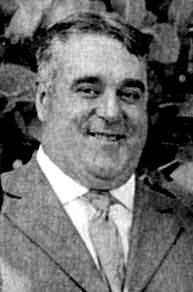
In Later Years

On 9 July 1917, his wife died suddenly of a heart attack after dinner at a Santa Monica restaurant near their home. Walking to a nearby store to buy a mourning dress, his 16-year-old daughter Una was hit by a car and seriously injured. Still mourning, on 12 September at a party given for Artcraft Studio publicity man Pete Schmid, Campbell met Pearl Gilman, a diminutive vaudeville comedian with a family reputation for gold-digging. She had been married to candy heir Charles W. Alisky in 1912, and a few years later divorced and married another wealthy man, Theodore Arnreiter. Her sister Mabelle was married to elderly steel magnate William Ellis Corey, the owner of U.S. Steel.

Just five days after they met, Campbell and Gilman Alisky-Arnreiter were married at the home of Elaine Hardy at 824 5th Street in Santa Monica. His daughter Una, still recuperating at a friend's home in Santa Monica Canyon, was not told of the wedding for several weeks. Less than two months after marrying him Gilman Alisky-Arnreiter sued him for divorce, claiming he abused her with his heavy drinking and profanity. He moved out of their Santa Monica bungalow and into the Los Angeles Athletic Club, taking a room next to his best friend Chaplin.

== Death ==
At a cast party, Campbell got drunk and, driving home at 4 am, crashed his car and died as a result.

His ashes remained unclaimed for over 30 years until laid to rest at an unknown site at Rosedale Cemetery. Una Campbell, the actor's only child, returned to the UK to live with relatives in Nottingham after her father died. She married a Philip O. Bull in Lewisham in 1930 and died in Croydon in 1967.

== Legacy ==
The 1996 documentary, Chaplin's Goliath: In Search of Scotland's Forgotten Star, written and directed by Kevin MacDonald, explored Campbell's life and work. During the making of the film, a plaque commemorating Campbell was placed at Rosedale Cemetery and another was added to the Castle House Museum at Castle Gardens, Dunoon.

== Filmography ==
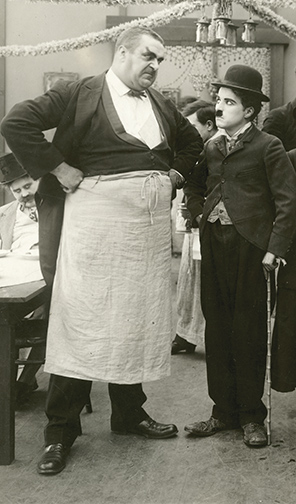
With Charlie Chaplin in The Immigrant (1917)

Year	Title	Role	Notes
1916	The Floorwalker	Store manager	Short
1916	The Fireman	Foreman of the Brigade	Short
1916	The Vagabond	Gypsy Chieftain	Short
1916	The Count	A Tailor	Short
1916	The Pawnshop	Burglar	Short
1916	Behind the Screen	Goliath (a stagehand)	Short
1916	The Rink	Mr. Stout, Edna's Admirer	Short
1917	Easy Street	The Bully	Short
1917	The Cure	Man with gout	Short
1917	The Immigrant	The head waiter	Short
1917	The Adventurer	The Suitor	Short
1918	How to Make Movies (Unreleased Film)	Golfer	Uncredited, (final film role)
