= Vendetta in a Hospital =

- Produced by: Henry Lehrman
- Starring: Billie Ritchie; Henry Bergman
- Distributed by: Universal Film Manufacturing Company
- Release date: September 8, 1915
- Running time: 1 reel
- Country: USA
- Language: Silent English titles

Vendetta in a Hospital is a 1915 silent short comedy film starring Billie Ritchie, Henry Bergman and Louise Orth. It was produced by the L-KO Kompany and distributed by Universal Film Manufacturing Company.

== Cast ==
- Billie Ritchie as Billie
- Louise Orth as Senorita Paprika
- Hank Mann as Mr. Jowlfish
- Henry Bergman as Fat La Jolla
- Gene Rogers as Nursie
- Raymond Griffith as ?unknown

== Preservation ==
- A print is preserved at the Library of Congress.
