= Henry Bergman =

American actor (1868–1946)

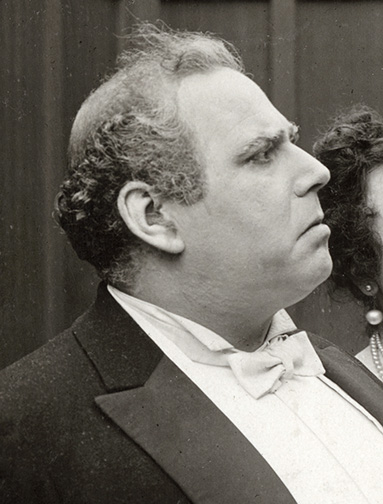
- Bergman in The Adventurer, 1917
- Born: February 23, 1868; San Francisco, California, U.S.
- Died: October 22, 1946 (aged 78); Hollywood, California, U.S.
- Occupation: Film actor
- Years active: 1913–1936

Henry Bergman (February 23, 1868 – October 22, 1946) was an American actor of stage and film, known for his long association with Charlie Chaplin.

== Biography ==
Born in San Francisco, California, Bergman acted in live theatre, appearing in Henrietta in 1888 at the Hollis Street Theatre in Boston and in the touring production of The Senator in 1892 and 1893. He made his Broadway debut in 1899 appearing with Anna Held in Papa's Wife, the musical hit of the year. He made his first film appearance with the L-KO Kompany in 1914 at the age of forty-six.

In 1916, Bergman started working with Charlie Chaplin, beginning with The Floorwalker. For the rest of his career, Bergman remained a character actor for Chaplin and worked as a studio assistant, including Assistant Director. He played in many Chaplin shorts and later features, including The Pawnshop, The Immigrant, A Dog's Life, The Gold Rush, The Circus, and City Lights. Bergman's last on-screen appearance was in Modern Times as a restaurant manager, and his final off-screen contribution was for The Great Dictator in 1940. Chaplin helped Bergman finance a restaurant in Hollywood, named "Henry's", which became a popular spot for celebrities as a precursor to the later Brown Derby restaurant.

Henry Bergman continued to be associated with the Chaplin Studios until his death from a heart attack in 1946. He is interred in the Hillside Memorial Park Cemetery in Culver City, California.

== Filmography ==
| Year | Title | Role | Notes |
|---|---|---|---|
| 1915 | The Kreutzer Sonata | Raphael Friedlander | |
| 1915 | The Melting Pot | Mendel Quixano | |
| 1915 | Vendetta in a Hospital | Fat La Jolla | Short |
| 1916 | The Floorwalker | Old Man | Short, Uncredited |
| 1916 | The Pawnshop | Pawnbroker | Short |
| 1916 | The Rink | Mrs. Stout | Short |
| 1917 | Easy Street | Anarchist | Short, Uncredited |
| 1917 | The Black Stork | The Detective | |
| 1917 | The Cure | Masseur | Short |
| 1917 | The Immigrant | Artist | Short |
| 1917 | The Adventurer | The Father | Short |
| 1918 | A Dog's Life | Fat Unemployed Man / Dance-hall Lady | Short, Uncredited |
| 1918 | The Bond | John Bull | Short, (British version), Uncredited |
| 1918 | Shoulder Arms | Fat Whiskered German Soldier / The Kaiser's General / Bartender | |
| 1919 | Sunnyside | Villager and Edna's Father | Short, Uncredited |
| 1919 | A Day's Pleasure | Captain / Man in Car / Heavy Policeman | Short, Uncredited |
| 1919 | The Professor | Bearded Man in Flophouse | Short, Uncredited |
| 1921 | The Kid | Professor Guido / Night Shelter Keeper | Uncredited |
| 1921 | The Idle Class | Sleeping Hobo / Guest in Cop Uniform | Uncredited |
| 1922 | Pay Day | Drinking Companion | Short |
| 1923 | The Pilgrim | Sheriff on Train / Man In Railroad Station | |
| 1923 | A Woman of Paris | Head Waiter | Uncredited |
| 1925 | The Gold Rush | Hank Curtis | |
| 1928 | The Circus | An Old Clown | |
| 1931 | City Lights | Mayor / Blind Girl's Downstairs Neighbor | Uncredited |
| 1936 | Modern Times | Cafe Proprietor | (final film role) |
