= Vincent P. Bryan =

American film director

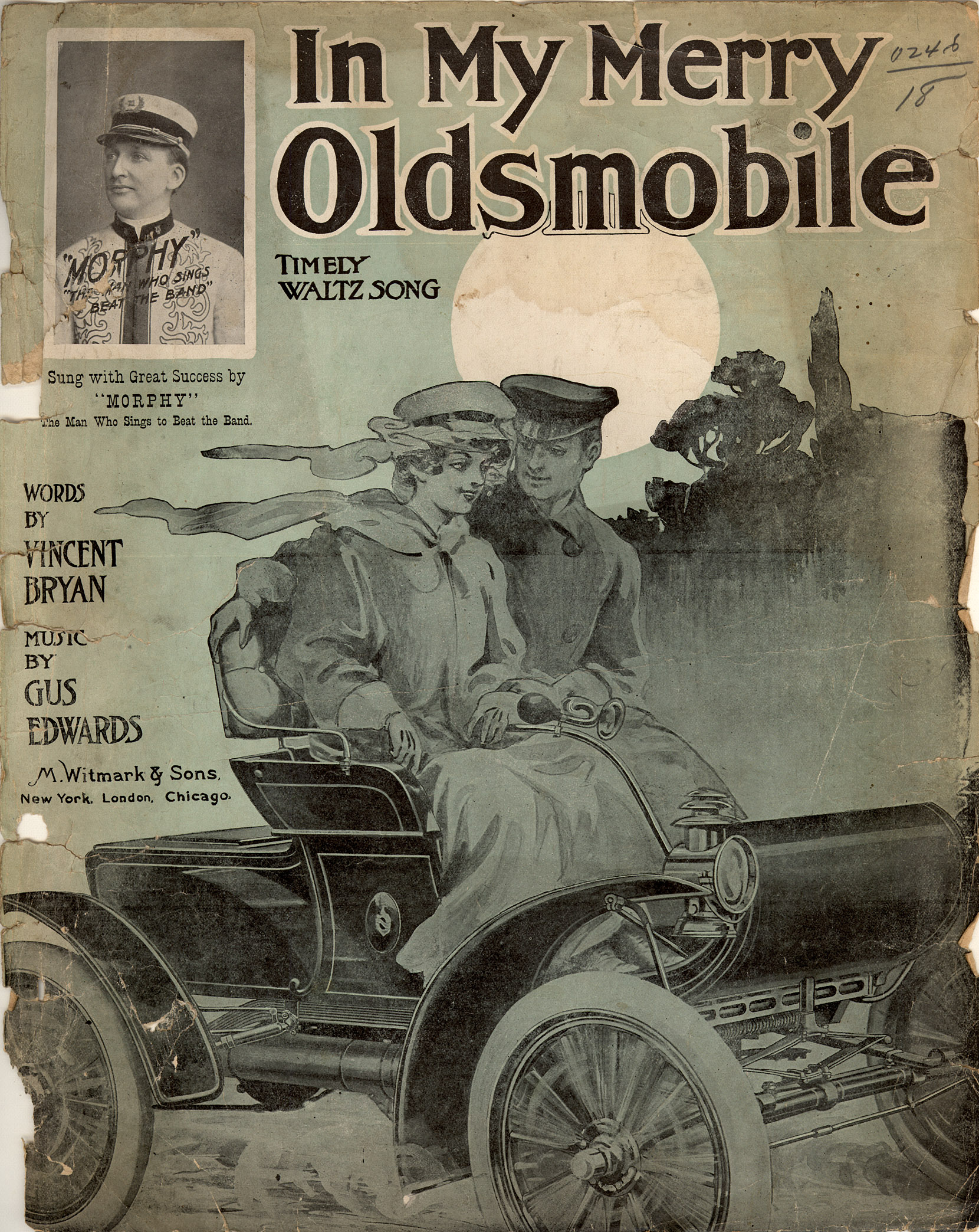
In My Merry Oldsmobile songbook featuring an Oldsmobile Curved Dash automobile

Vincent Patrick Bryan (June 22, 1878 – April 27, 1937) was an American composer and lyricist.

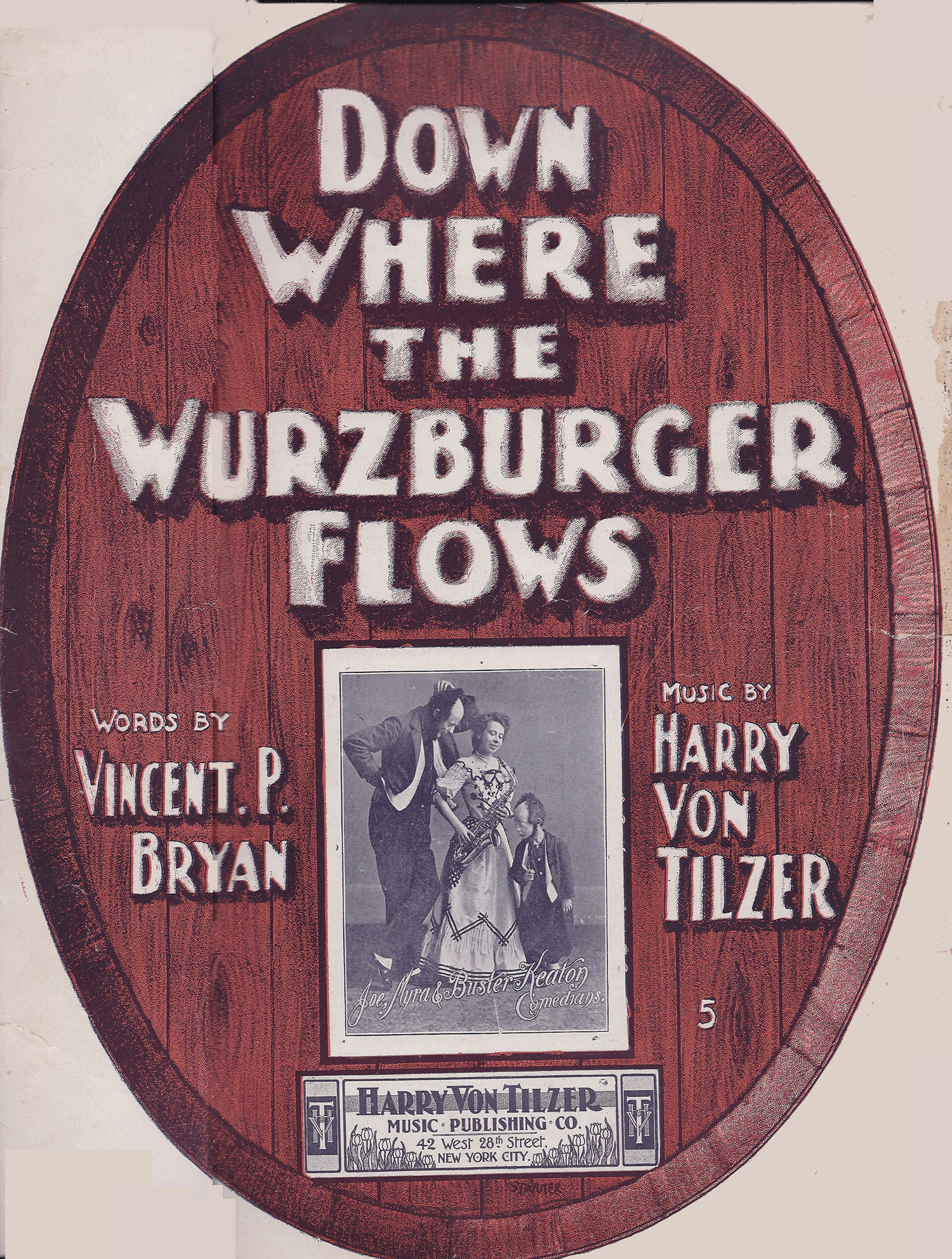
Vincent P Bryan Down Where The Wurzburger Flows

In the 1903-1909 production of The Wizard of Oz he was called upon to introduce new songs in numerous revisions.

- with Theodore F. Morse
  - Nautical Nonsense (Hurrah for Baffin's Bay!) (Scarecrow and Tin Woodman)
- with J.B. Mullen
  - Down on the Brandywine (Trixie Tryfle and Pastoria)
  - 'Twas Enough to Make a Perfect Lady Mad (Cynthia Cynch)
  - Under a Panama (Dorothy Gale)
  - The Nightmare (Scarecrow and Tin Woodman)
- with Charles Zimmerman
  - Marching Thro' Georgia (Scarecrow and Tin Woodman)
  - Sitting Bull (Scarecrow)
  - Football (Scarecrow and Tin Woodman)
  - Marching Through Port Arthur (Scarecrow and Tin Woodman)
- with Leo Edwards
  - The Tale of the Monkey (Cynthia Cynch)
  - My Own Girl (Sir Dashemoff Daily)

He was a close behind-the-scenes collaborator of Charlie Chaplin from 1915 to 1917. Along with Hal Roach he directed three Harold Lloyd films in 1919: He Leads, Others Follow, Soft Money and Pay Your Dues. An addiction to heroin prematurely ended his promising career in motion pictures.

He was born in St. John's, Newfoundland and died in Los Angeles, California.
