= Gene Rodemich =

American pianist and orchestra leader (1890-1934)

- Gene Rodemich
- Born: April 13, 1890; St. Louis, Missouri
- Died: February 27, 1934, (age 43); New York
- Occupations: band leader, pianist
- Spouses: Stella Devaney, Henrietta Pauk Rodemich (1915-1934, his death)

Eugene Frederick Rodemich (April 13, 1890 in St. Louis, Missouri – February 27, 1934 in New York) was a pianist and orchestra leader, who composed the music for numerous films in the late 1920s and early 1930s, mostly cartoons and live-action short subjects produced by The Van Beuren Corporation and distributed by RKO Radio Pictures.

== Early life ==
Rodemich was born in St. Louis, son of a dentist, Dr. Henry Rodemich, and wife Barbara (nee Mahiger) Rodemich. Henry and Barbara also had a daughter, Estelle. After Barbara's death in 1897, Henry married Rosele Fairchild with whom he had two children, Emmet and L'rene. Gene Rodemich began his musical career in and near his home town as a pianist, later becoming conductor of a dance orchestra. An entrepreneur, he formed the Rodemich Orchestra Exchange, through which he put together small bands of St. Louis-area musicians to play for wedding receptions and other social functions. Wanting to try his chances as an accompanist and bandleader in Chicago and then New York City, Rodemich sold his orchestra exchange to Gus Haenschen, a popular bandleader in St. Louis. In 1919, when Haenschen was named founding Director of Popular Releases for the new Brunswick Record Company in New York City, Rodemich became one of the first bandleaders to whom Haenschen offered an exclusive Brunswick recording contract.

Before joining Brunswick, Rodemich was the primary accompanist for Elsie Janis on several tours, including one in Europe. Before starting in radio in New York, 1929, he had for three years been director and master of ceremonies at the Metropolitan Theatre, Boston.

== Later career ==
Rodemich was musical director of Van Beuren Studios from 1929 through 1934, writing music and directing the orchestra for animated cartoon series such as Aesop's Fables, Tom and Jerry (a duo similar to Mutt & Jeff, not to be confused with MGM's famous cat and mouse of the 40s and 50s) and Cubby the Bear. He composed for many of the studio’s live-action shorts, featuring comedians such as Bert Lahr and Shemp Howard, as well as Van Beuren's 1932-1934 reissues of Charlie Chaplin's Mutual comedies of 1916-1917. He also scored Frank Buck’s first feature-length film, Bring 'Em Back Alive (1932). He also conducted during numerous NBC programs and recorded for Brunswick Records.

Singles

Year	Single	US
1920	"Margie"	7
1923	"Wolverine Blues"	7

== Death ==
Rodemich became ill while making a recording with his orchestra, which had been accompanying an NBC radio program on Sunday nights. He insisted on continuing the recording although he had been stricken with a severe chill. He was taken to the Medical Arts Sanitarium, 57 West Fifty-Seventh Street, and died three days later of lobar pneumonia. He is buried in Kensico Cemetery, Valhalla, New York. A widow, a son, and a daughter survived him.

In late 1933, he was succeeded at the Van Beuren studio by his assistant, Winston Sharples.
