= Tom Woottwell =

- Born: Thomas Hare Burgess; 25 March 1864; Highbury, London, England
- Died: 13 February 1941 (aged 76); Portsmouth, Hampshire
- Occupations: Comedian, dancer, monologuist

Tom Woottwell (born Thomas Hare Burgess; 25 March 1864–13 February 1941) was an English music hall comedian, dancer and monologuist, popular around the turn of the twentieth century.

== Biography ==
He was born in Highbury, London, the son of a builder. He took to the stage as a member of a double act, and later as one of a successful troupe, the Girards, performing an act of "legmania" - a craze in the 1870s and 80s described as "a cross between eccentric dancing, acrobatics and gymnastics, all performed at a frenzied speed."

After the troupe leader, Julian Girard, was injured, in 1882 Woottwell started working as a solo comedian and stage performer. He performed as a "mock strong man", and in pantomimes. He was sometimes billed as "The India Rubber Man" and "The Loose Legged Comedian". By the mid-1890s he was in full-time work, and later claimed that, in 1900, he was the first music hall performer to own a motor car, which he used to transport himself around London to up to eight shows a night.

He married another music hall performer, singer and actress Emily Lyndale, who was a popular principal boy in pantomimes. Woottwell toured in Australia — where he helped launch the career of Billy Williams — as well as in South Africa, and the U.S.. In 1897, "Tom Woottwell's Komic Song Album" was published in Australia, containing 17 of his songs and an autobiographical sketch in which Woottwell made preposterous claims about his background such as "I invented steam...[and] made several stars and stuck them in the sky...".

He also made recordings between about 1905 and 1913 of around sixty of his songs and monologues, most of which he wrote himself. Many reflected a comic Cockney persona, including "Wait a Minute", "Ave a Drop of Gin, Old Dear", "Interruptions", and "Blowed if I Didn’t Wake Up". Woottwell also performed as an actor, in the original 1917 run of The Better 'Ole, a comedy based on the cartoon character Old Bill, drawn by Bruce Bairnsfather.

He retired from performing in the early 1920s, and moved with his wife to live in Milton, Portsmouth. He died from heart failure in 1941, at the age of 76.
