= The Better 'Ole (1926 film) =

1926 film

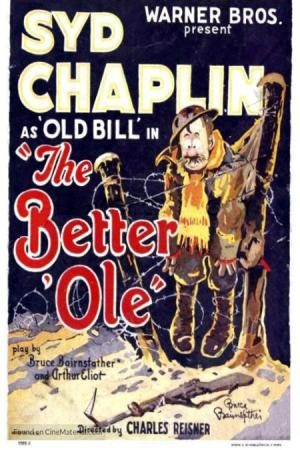
- Film poster
- Directed by: Charles Reisner
- Written by: Charles Reisner (adaptation); Darryl F. Zanuck (adaptation); Robert Hopkins (titles)
- Based on: The Better 'Ole, or, The Romance of Old Bill (1918 play) by Bruce Bairnsfather and Arthur Elliot
- Starring: Sydney Chaplin; Doris Hill; Harold Goodwin; Jack Ackroyd
- Cinematography: Edwin B. DuPar
- Edited by: Ray Enright
- Music by: Maurice Baron
- Production company: The Vitaphone Corporation
- Distributed by: Warner Bros. Pictures
- Release date: October 23, 1926 (US)
- Running time: 97 minutes
- Country: United States
- Languages: Sound (Synchronized) (English Intertitles)
- Budget: $449,000
- Box office: $1,273,000

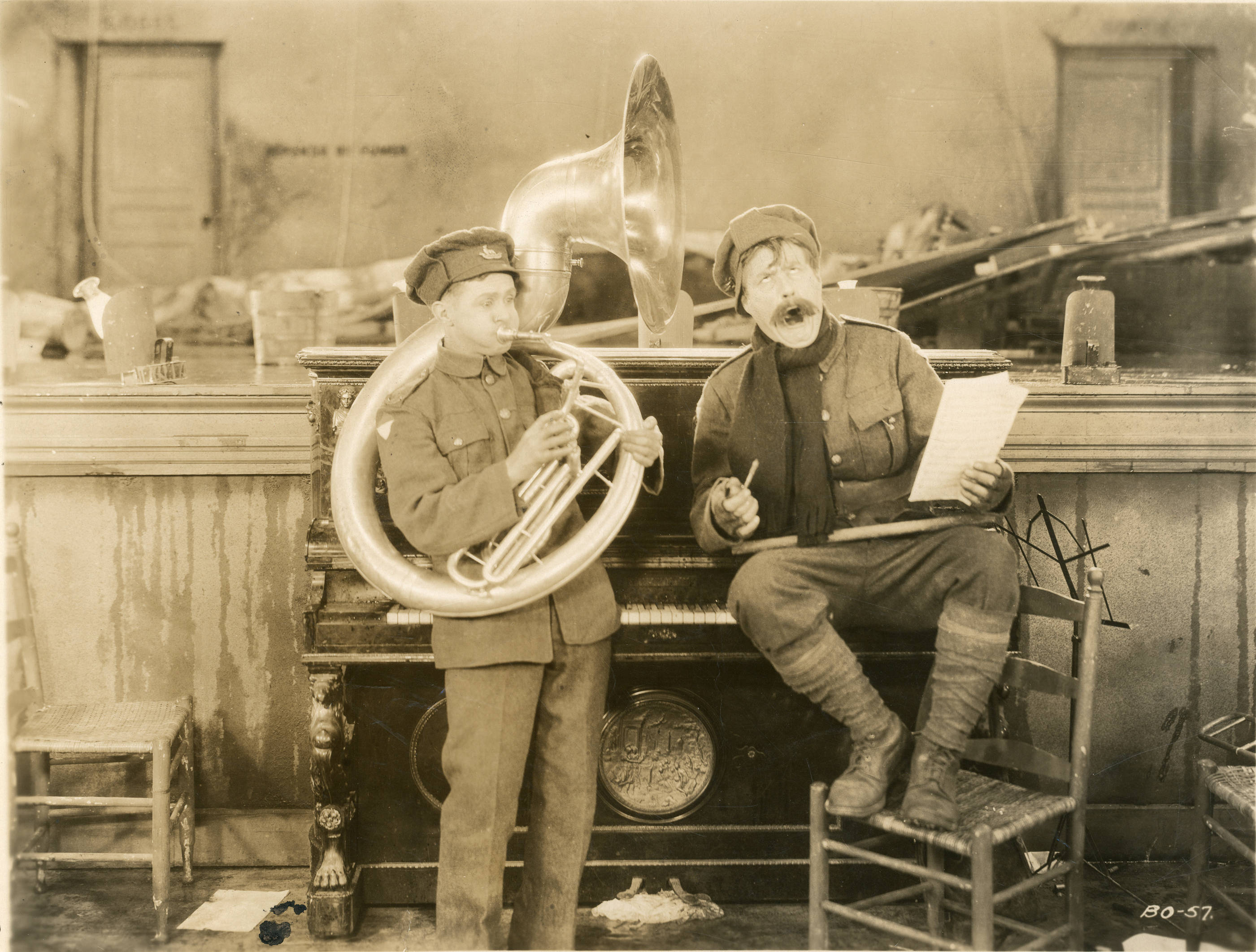
The Better 'Ole film still

The Better 'Ole (1926)

The Better 'Ole is a 1926 American synchronized sound World War I comedy drama film. Released by Warner Bros. Pictures, Inc., it was the second full-length film to utilize the Vitaphone sound-on-disc process, two months after the first Vitaphone feature Don Juan. With no audible dialogue, the film does have a synchronized musical score and sound effects. This film was also the second onscreen adaptation of the 1917 musical The Better 'Ole by Bruce Bairnsfather and Arthur Elliot. Charlie Chaplin's eldest brother Sydney Chaplin played the main lead as Old Bill in perhaps his best-known film today. This film is also believed by many to have the first spoken word of dialog, "coffee", although there are those who disagree. At one point during the film, Harold Goodwin's character whispers a word to Sydney Chaplin which is also faintly heard. This was discovered by the UCLA's Robert Gitt, during the restoration of the sound discs for the film. The line was recorded in perfect sync, apparently during the orchestra recording sessions rather than live on set, therefore making it the earliest known use of dubbing in a motion picture.

== Plot ==
Old Bill, a jovial Limey sergeant, serves in the Army during World War I, where he gets into various scrapes alongside his fellow soldier, Alf. While helping himself to a drink in the cellar of an inn, Bill discovers that the innkeeper, Gaspard, is a German spy. However, Bill's regimental leader, Major Russett, is in league with Gaspard and lets him loose before shooting him, claiming he was escaping. The spies have alerted the Germans to a weakness in the English defenses and they attack during a stage performance where Bill and Alf are dressed as a pantomime horse. The English retreat and the Germans take the town and capture Bill's friend friend Bert and local farm girl Joan. Bill and Alf escape the theater still dressed as a horse and infiltrate the German ranks. Bill learns from Bert that the Germans are mining the town, to sabotage the English attempt to retake it. Bill and Alf steal a car and make a break for the English lines. Despite crashing the car, they manage to discover the Germans' plan to blow up the bridge as the English enter the town. Bill is able to stop Major Russett before he can enact the plan, but Bill is still dressed as a German soldier and the sergeant and General don't believe him. He is sentenced to be shot as a spy, but is saved when Bert reveals that he is an intelligence officer and he confirms that it is Russett who is the spy. Bill is released and promoted to Sergeant.

== Cast ==
- Sydney Chaplin as Pvt. William 'Old Bill' Busby
- Doris Hill as Joan
- Harold Goodwin as Bert Chester, Secret Service
- Jack Ackroyd as Alfie "Little Alf"
- Edgar Kennedy as Cpl. Austin
- Theodore Lorch as Gaspard
- Charles K. Gerrard as Maj. Russett (credited as Charles Gerrard)
- Tom McGuire as The English General
- Tom Kennedy as The Blacksmith
- Kewpie Morgan as Gen. von Hinden
- Arthur Clayton as The Colonel

== Box office ==
According to Warner Bros. records, the film earned $955,000 domestically and $318,000 foreign.

== Preservation ==
The film, as well at its Vitaphone soundtrack, survive, though it is incomplete, with one reel presumed missing. The film exists in the UCLA Film & Television Archive.

== Home media ==
This film was released on DVD-R through the Warner Archive Collection in 2009.

== See also ==
- List of early sound feature films (1926–1929)
- List of early Warner Bros. sound and talking features
