= Old bill =

Old bill or Old Bill may refer to:

- Slang for the police, used in the United Kingdom
- Old Bill (comics), a cartoon character created in 1914–15 by Bruce Bairnsfather
  - The Better 'Ole or The Romance of Old Bill, 1917 stage musical comedy based on the cartoon character
  - The Romance of Old Bill, 1918 British silent film based on the play
- Old Bill Williams (1787-1849), American mountain man and frontiersman

== See also ==
- Poor Old Bill, 1931 British comedy film
