= A Dog's Life (1918 film) =

1918 film by Charlie Chaplin

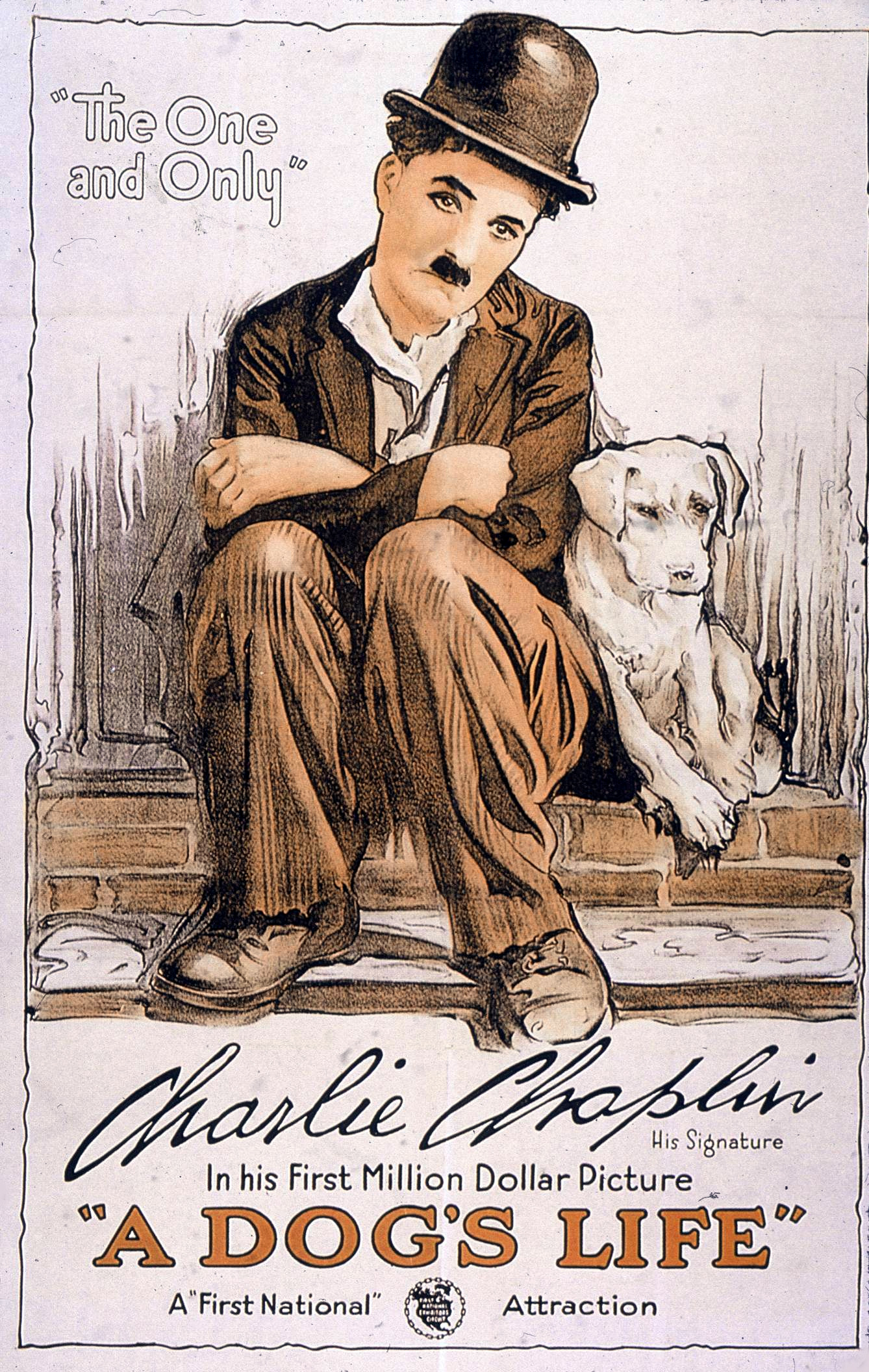
- Theatrical poster
- Directed by: Charlie Chaplin
- Written by: Charlie Chaplin
- Produced by: Charlie Chaplin
- Starring: Charlie Chaplin; Edna Purviance; Syd Chaplin; Henry Bergman; Charles Reisner; Albert Austin; Tom Wilson
- Cinematography: Roland Totheroh
- Edited by: Charlie Chaplin (uncredited)
- Music by: Charlie Chaplin (in 1957 released as part of The Chaplin Revue)
- Distributed by: First National Pictures Inc.
- Release date: April 14, 1918
- Running time: 35 minutes
- Country: United States
- Languages: Silent film English (original intertitles)
- Budget: $1 million

A Dog's Life

A Dog's Life is a 1918 American silent comedy short film written, produced and directed by Charlie Chaplin. This was Chaplin's first film for First National Pictures. It was part of a then groundbreaking $1 million contract. It was for a total of eight 3 reel short silent films.

Chaplin plays opposite an animal as "co-star". "Scraps" (the dog) was the hero in this film, as he helps Charlie and Edna towards a better life. Edna Purviance plays a dance hall singer and Charlie Chaplin, The Tramp. Sydney Chaplin (Chaplin's brother) had a small role in this film; this was the first time the two brothers were on screen together.

Charles Lapworth, a former newspaper editor who had met Chaplin when he interviewed him, took a role as a consultant on the film.

== Plot ==
Charlie is jobless and has few prospects for employment. He tries to steal food from a lunch cart and is nearly caught by a police officer, avoiding arrest by doing some fancy rolling back and forth under a fence. Later, Charlie saves a stray dog (Scraps) from other dogs. Charlie and Scraps become fast friends and partners in purloining food. Charlie enters a cabaret where dogs are not allowed. Charlie hides Scraps in his baggy trousers, but Scraps' tail emerges from the back end. Charlie meets a girl who works in the cabaret. She is disillusioned with life, so Charlie attempts to cheer her up. Charlie is ejected from the cabaret for having no money and returns to his normal outdoor sleeping spot. By chance, thieves have buried a stolen wallet nearby that is laden with a small fortune. Scraps digs up the wallet. Charlie returns to the cafe and shows the girl he has enough money for them to be married. The crooks discover that Charlie has the wallet and violently take it back from him. Charlie fights furiously to reclaim it. This leads to a frantic chase which culminates in the thieves' arrest. Charlie uses the money to buy a farm for himself and his bride. The movie ends with the newlyweds peering fondly into a cradle. It contains Scraps, who is revealed to be a girl, and her puppies.

== Cast ==
- Charlie Chaplin – The Tramp
- Edna Purviance – Bar singer
- Mut – Scraps, a thoroughbred mongrel
- Syd Chaplin – Lunchwagon owner
- Henry Bergman – Fat unemployed man / Dance-hall lady
- Charles Reisner – Employment agency clerk / Door-to-door / Drummer
- Albert Austin – Thief
- Granville Redmond — Dance-hall owner
- Bud Jamison – Thief
- Tom Wilson – Policeman
- James T. Kelley — Sausage buyer / Robbed passer
- M. J. McCarthy – Unemployed man
- Mel Brown – Unemployed man
- Charles Force – Unemployed man
- Bert Appling – Unemployed man
- Thomas Riley – Unemployed man
- Louis Fitzroy – Unemployed man
- Slim Cole – Unemployed man
- Ted Edwards – Unemployed man
- Loyal Underwood — Unemployed man / Dance-hall man

== Stills ==
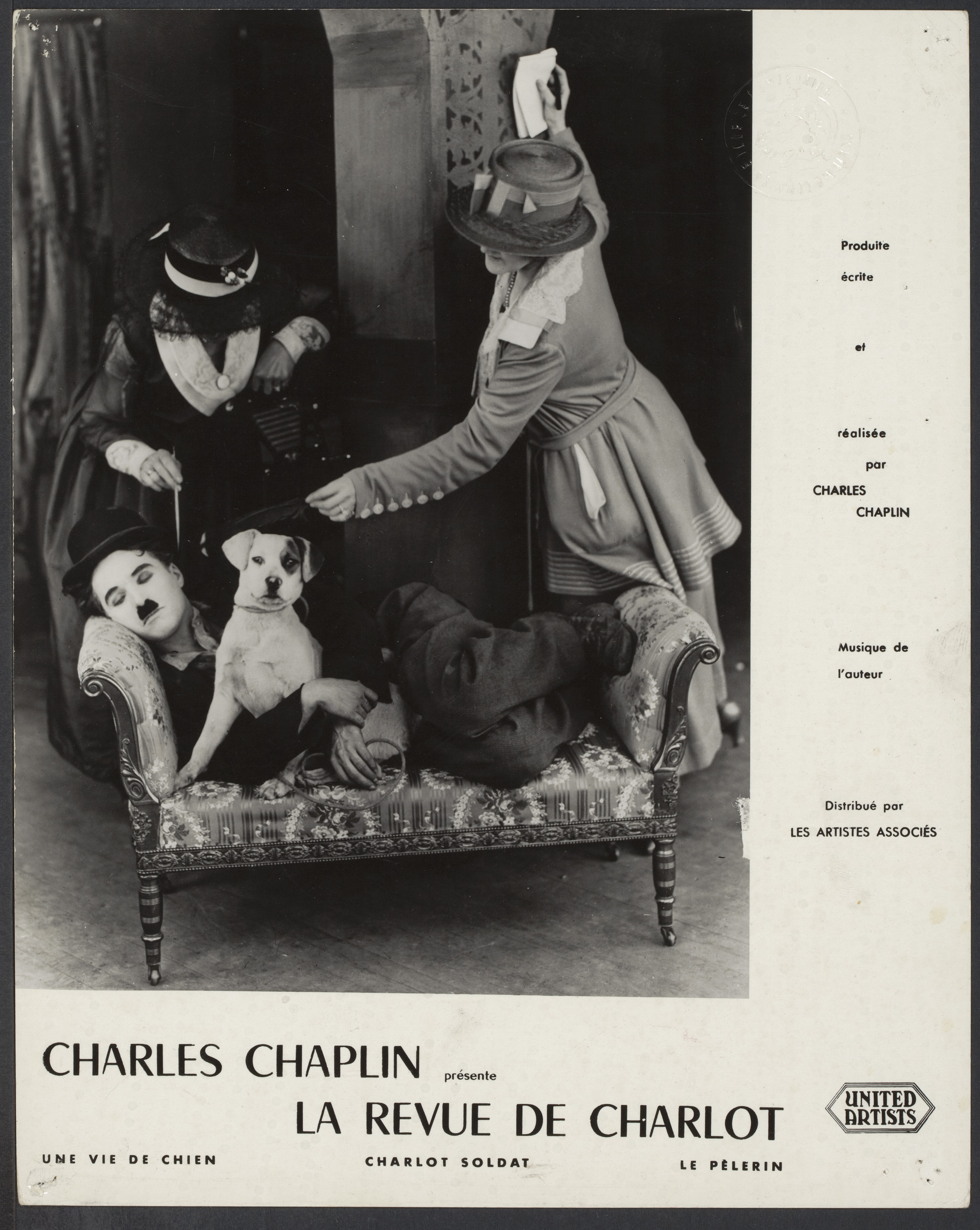

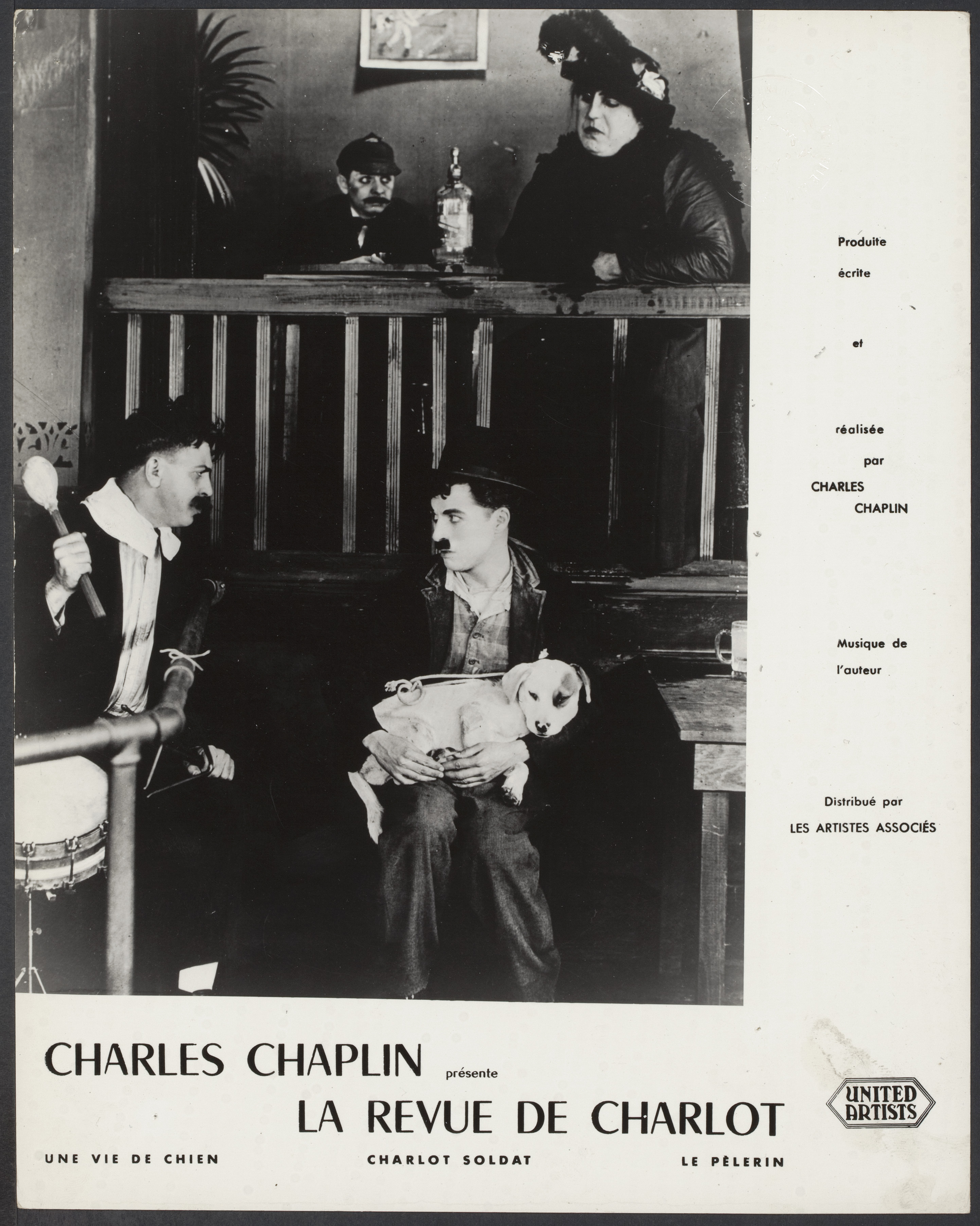

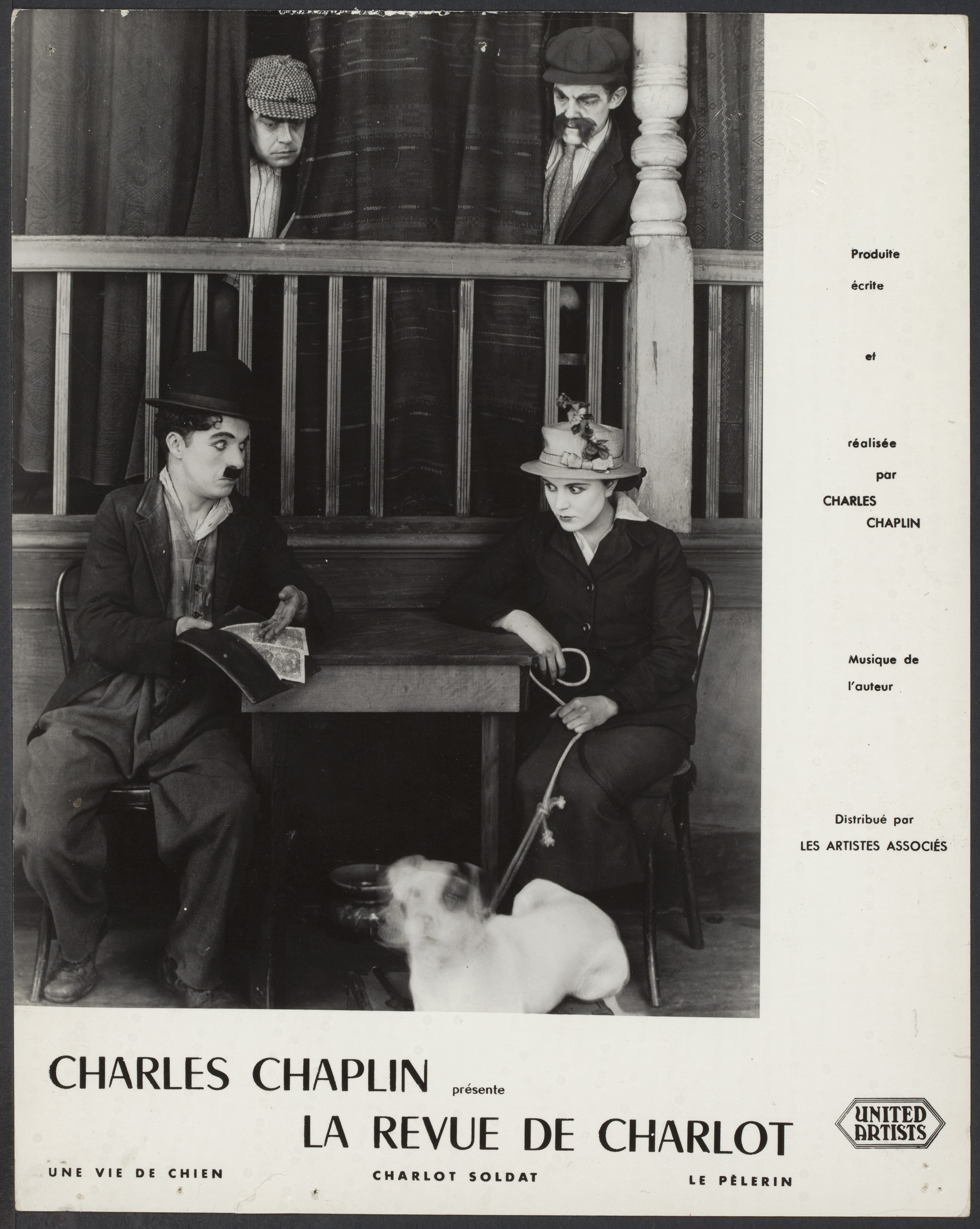

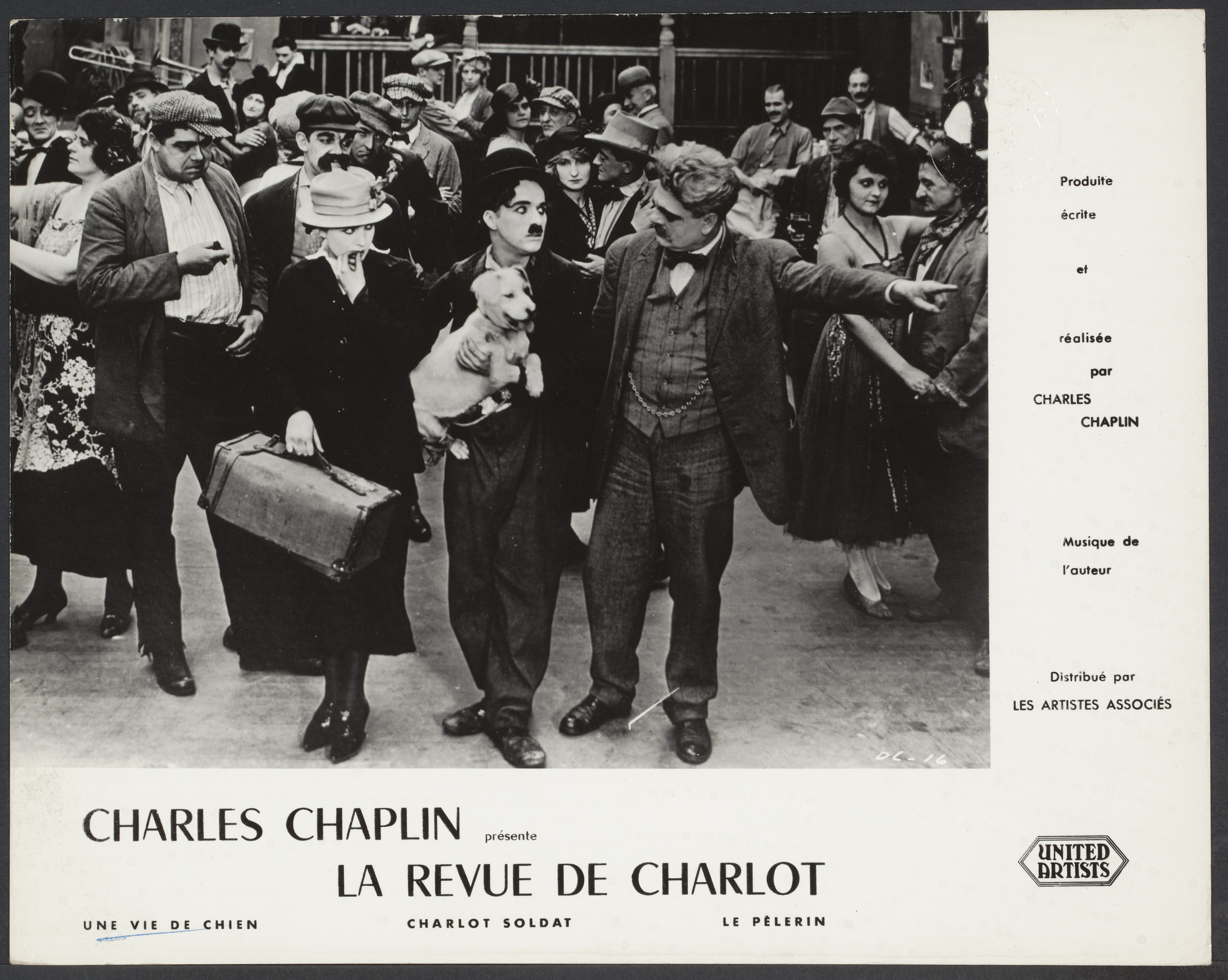

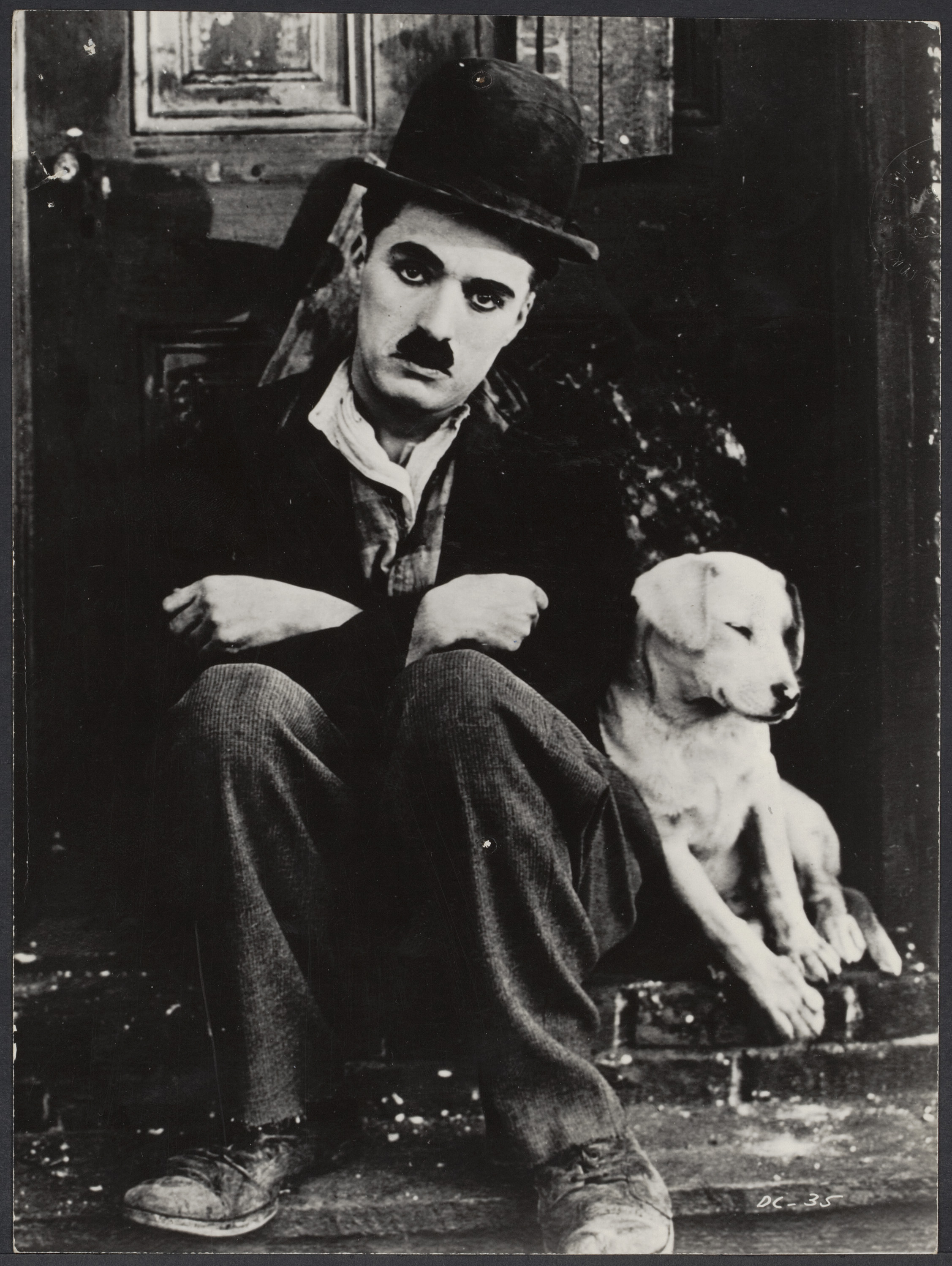

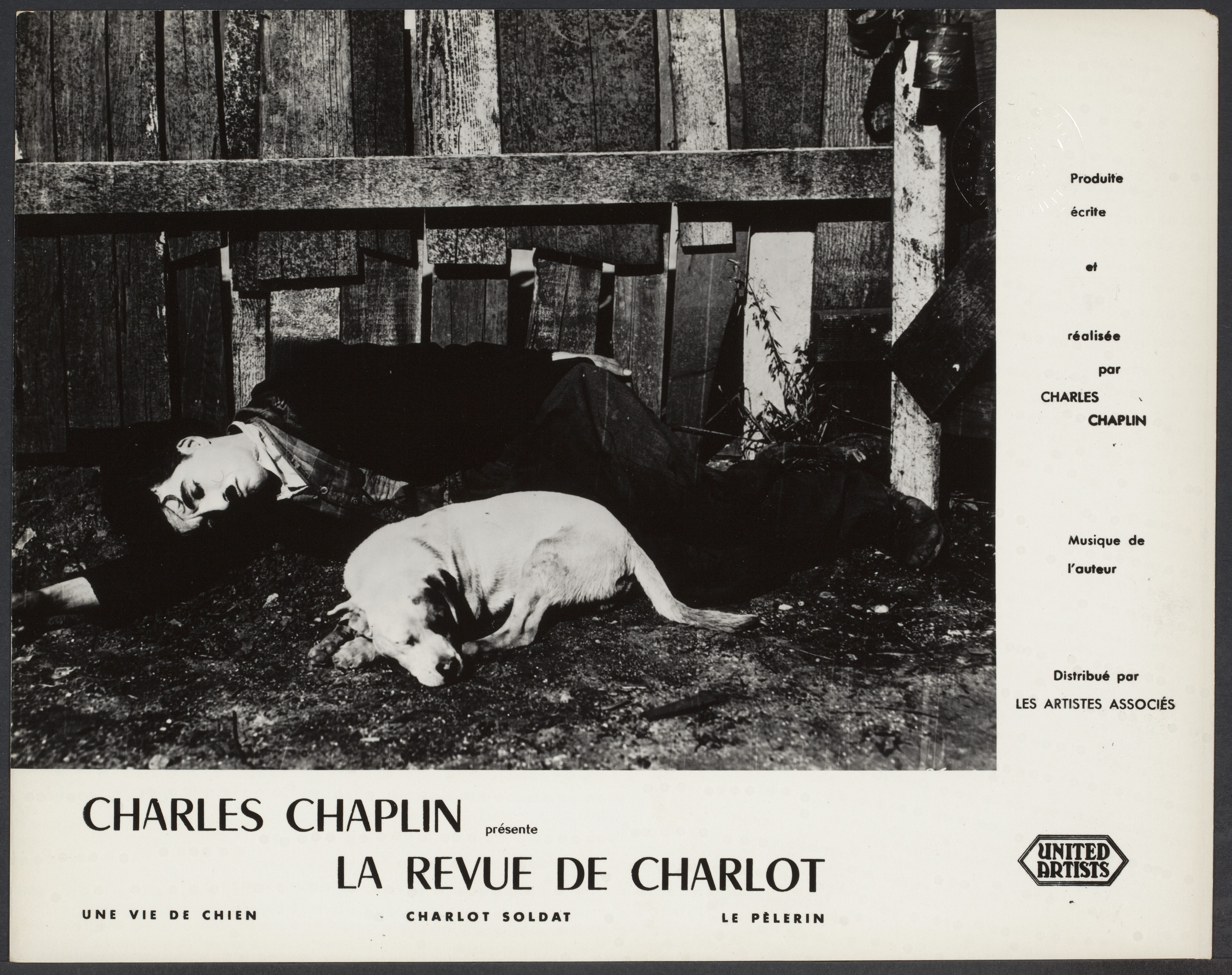

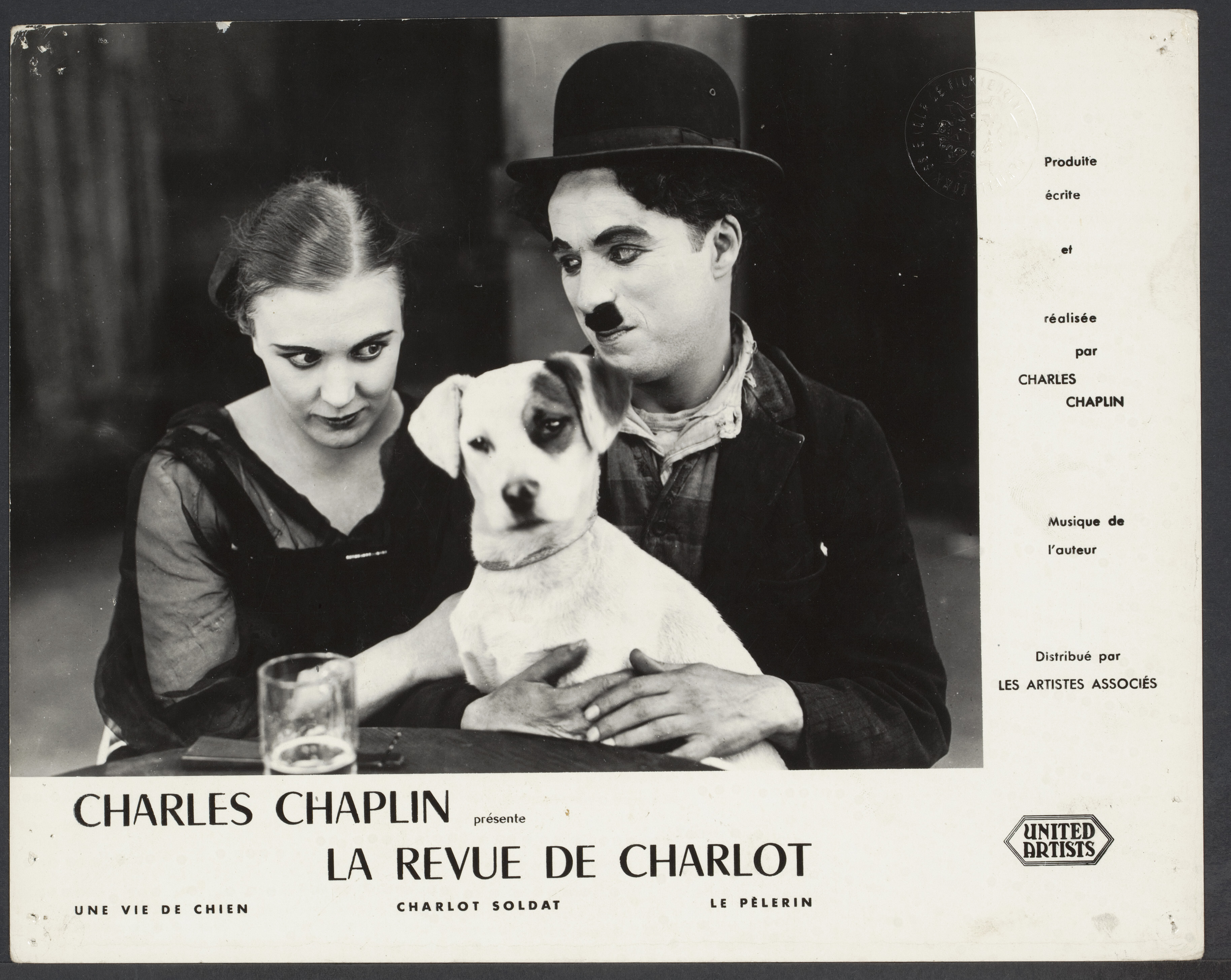

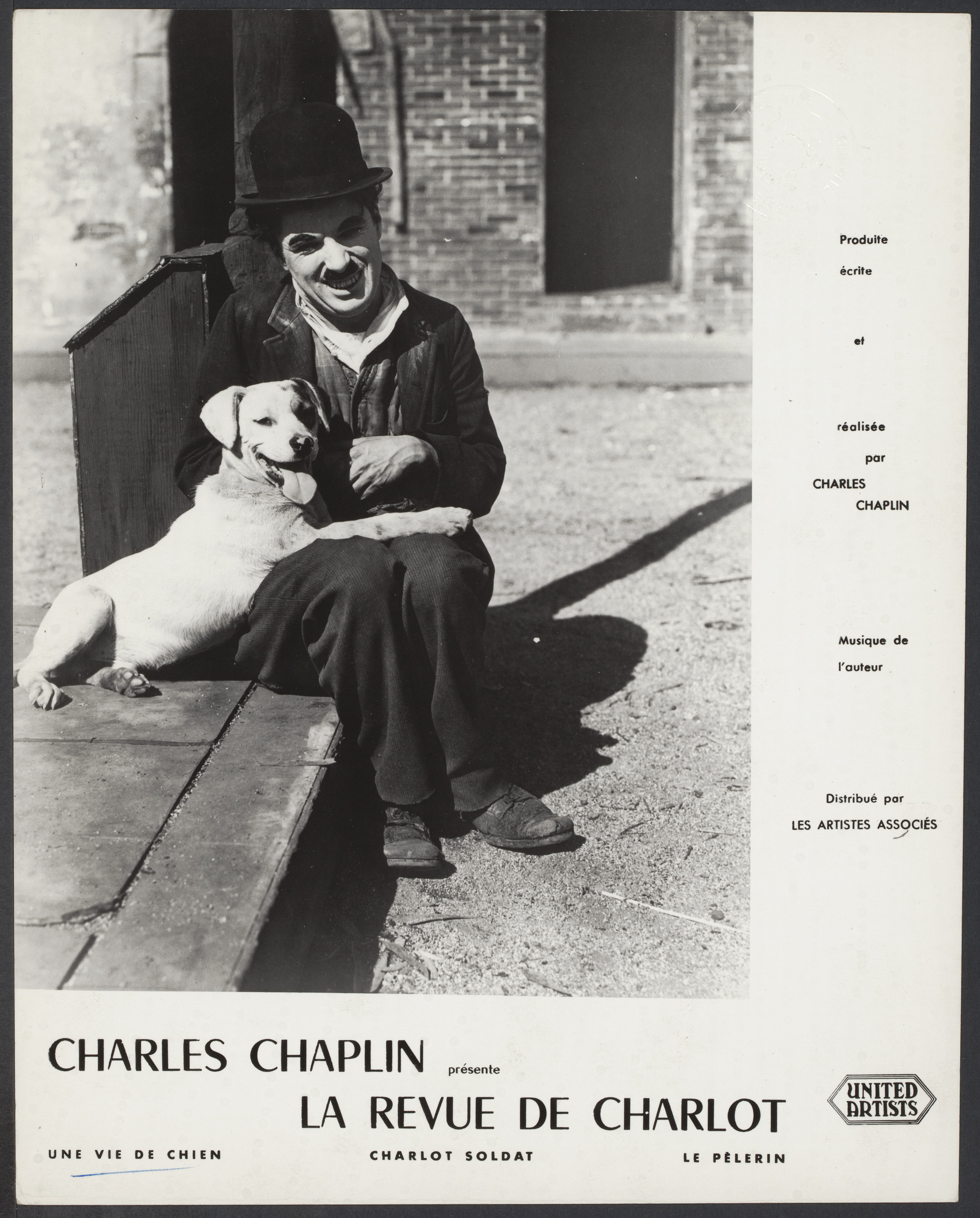
