= Sydney Chaplin =

English actor (1885–1965)

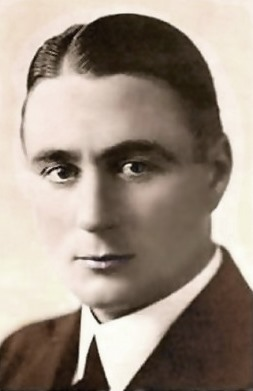
- Born: Sydney John Hill; 16 March 1885; London, England
- Died: 16 April 1965 (aged 80); Nice, France
- Occupation: Actor
- Years active: 1905–1929
- Spouses: Minnie (m. 1908; died 1936); Henriette (m. 1941)
- Mother: Hannah Hill
- Relatives: See Chaplin family

Sydney John Chaplin (né Hill; 16 March 1885 – 16 April 1965) was an English actor. Chaplin was the elder half-brother of actor and filmmaker Charlie Chaplin and in later life, served as his business manager.

Through their mother Hannah, they were older half-brothers to the younger Wheeler Dryden, who grew up separately with his father in England and was not told about his half-brothers until 1915. Dryden later immigrated to the United States, joining the Chaplins in Hollywood. Sydney Chaplin was also a half-uncle of actor Sydney Chaplin (1926–2009), who was named after him.

== Early life ==
Sydney John Hill was born in London to the unmarried 19-year-old Hannah Hill, who was a music hall entertainer. She claimed the boy's father was Sydney Hawkes, but his father's identity was never verified. Hannah was of Romanichal heritage. A year later, his mother married Charles Chaplin Sr., and the latter became his legal guardian. Sydney's surname was changed to Chaplin. Hannah and Charles had a son together called Charlie.

Upon separating from Charles after Charlie's birth, Hannah raised the two boys on her own. Once her own career in the entertainment business as a singer failed, Charlie and Syd were placed in an orphanage in 1896. Syd, who was four years older than Charlie, looked out for his half-brother like a paternal figure while they navigated poverty and workhouses. Both brothers would work tirelessly to send money back to their mother, who was suffering from mental illness. Charlie would often credit Syd for their ability to survive in the orphanage and on the streets. Following a bout of their mother's psychosis and a short stay in another orphanage, Syd and Charlie were sent back to Charles Chaplin Sr., who was an alcoholic.

While Syd and half-brother Charlie were in the Cuckoo Schools in Hanwell following their mother's mental collapse, Syd was placed in the programme designed to train young boys to become sailors. He served on the training ship HMS Exmouth, docked at Grays, Essex. He followed this training period with several years working on ships, receiving high marks from all of his employers but his ambition was to get into the entertainment business like his parents and brother, and he left his final voyage with that in mind.

Syd got his first experience playing comedy during one of tours to South Africa on Kinfairns Castle in 1903, where he performed for the ship's passengers.

In 1905 Charlie and Sydney worked briefly together in one of their first stage appearances, Sherlock Holmes. Syd was briefly cast as a villain in that play. In 1906 he landed a contract with Fred Karno, of Karno's London Comedians, and worked hard to bring Charlie into the company two years later. Charlie never achieved the sort of fame Syd did as a principal comedian for that company, but surpassed him later as an actor, director and producer.

After Charlie achieved worldwide fame in 1915, the brothers were contacted by their half-brother Wheeler Dryden, whose father had just told him of the connection. His father had removed Wheeler from their mother as an infant and brought him up separately. Wheeler was also an actor, and the brothers reunited in Hollywood in 1918 after they all immigrated to the United States. They occasionally worked together at Charlie Chaplin's studio through to the 1950s.

== Career ==
=== Keystone ===
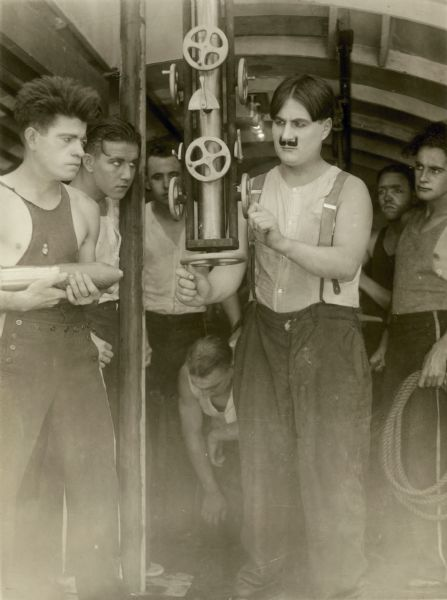
Syd Chaplin at the periscope in a scene still from A Submarine Pirate (Keystone, 1915)

As Charlie was negotiating his Keystone contract in Hollywood, he suggested that Syd should join the studio. Syd and his wife Minnie Chaplin arrived in California in October 1914.

Syd made a few appearances with the Keystone stock company in supporting roles before starring as a new character, Reggie Gussle. Gussle was a brash, mustachioed, happy-go-lucky fellow who enjoyed flirting with women and sneaking drinks, but was usually under the watchful eye of his large, ominous wife (Phyllis Allen). Syd Chaplin was less frantic than the other Keystone comedians, who usually ran around the scene with exaggerated gestures. Syd's antics were slower but quite energetic. His expressive face was also featured in numerous close-ups, unusual for Keystone stars. His improvisational approach sometimes resulted in scenes running very long—in one case, so long that the finished scenes were divided into two separate comedies, Gussle's Backward Way and Gussle Tied to Trouble.

The Gussle comedies caught on very quickly, and within the year these one-reel, 10-minute comedies were doubled in length. Syd Chaplin made 12 Gussle subjects, and then starred in an extended-length featurette, A Submarine Pirate in 1915. Second to Tillie's Punctured Romance, this was the most financially successful comedy Keystone ever made. Writing in The Smart Set magazine in 1916, critic George Jean Nathan stated that Charlie Chaplin was "not nearly so good a comique as his brother."

=== Charlie's business affairs ===
Following this success, Syd decided to leave the screen to negotiate Charlie a better contract. After getting him a $500,000 contract with Mutual on 27 February 1916, he got him his first million-dollar ($1.25 million) contract on 17 June 1917 with First National Pictures. Soon he was handling the majority of Charlie's business affairs, in addition to further contract negotiations. Their sheet music business failed, but they were successful with a merchandising one.

Sydney also appeared in a few of Charlie's films during the First National era, such as Pay Day and The Pilgrim. Sydney achieved his own million-dollar contract from Famous Players–Lasky in 1919, but a series of problems resulted in his making only one, failed, film, King, Queen, Joker (1921). He disappeared from the screen once again.

=== Aviation ===
During this period, Syd Chaplin's most important contribution may be in the field of aviation. In May 1919, he, along with pilot Emory Herman Rogers Jr., developed and launched the first privately owned domestic American airline, the Syd Chaplin Airline Company, based in Santa Monica, California. Although the corporation lasted only a year, in that time it established many "firsts." Syd and partners had the first airplane showroom for their Curtiss airplanes. It offered observation flights for $10 and round-trip flights to San Diego for $150.

On 4 July 1919, the Syd Chaplin Aircraft Corporation began flights to Santa Catalina Island. Sydney Chaplin Aerodrome (Chaplin Airfield) was south of Wilshire and west of Crescent (now bounded by Wilshire Boulevard, Fairfax Avenue, and San Vincente Boulevard).

Emery H. Rogers conducted the first round trip Los Angeles to San Francisco flight in one 24-hour period. Charlie Chaplin took his first airplane flight in one of Syd's planes, as did many other notable figures of the period. Syd Chaplin got out of the aviation business after governments began to pass legislation regulating pilot licensing and the taxation of planes and flights.

==== Roger's Field ====
On 29 December 1920, Amelia Earhart was booked for a passenger flight, at the-now Emory Roger's Roger's Field which included Chaplin Airfield and DeMille Field No. 2. The cost was $10 for a 10 minute flight with Frank Hawks (later gaining fame as an air racer), giving her a ride that would forever change Earhart's life.

=== Return to acting ===
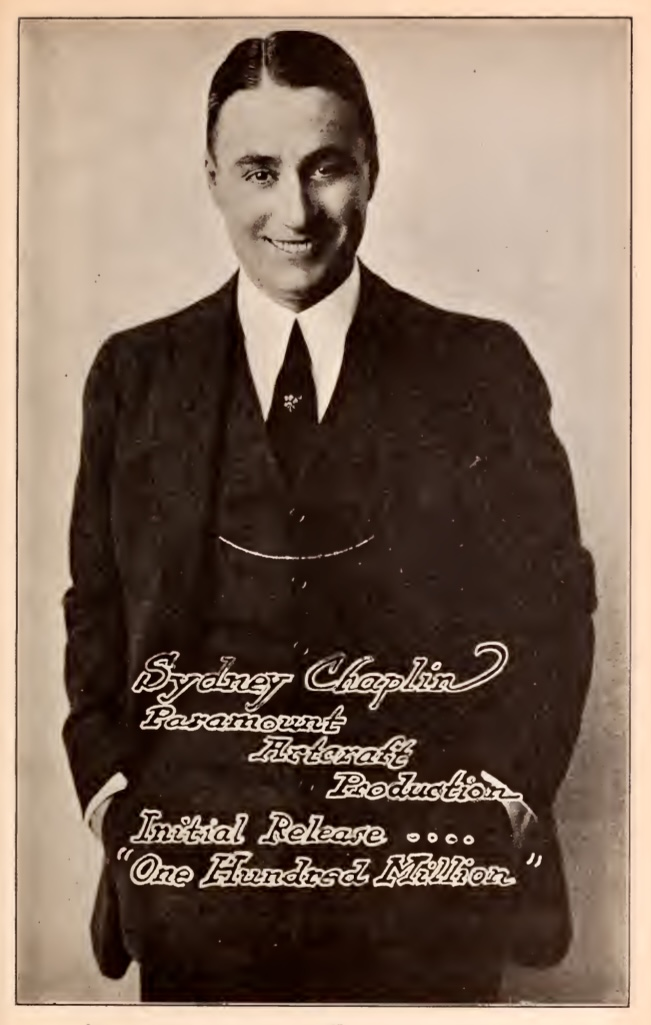
Sydney Chaplin pictured 1920 (Motion Picture Studio Directory and Trade Annual)

He returned to acting, and later films include The Perfect Flapper (1924) with Colleen Moore, and Charley's Aunt (1925). He made five features for Warner Bros. Pictures, including The Man on the Box (1925), Oh, What a Nurse! (1926), The Missing Link (1927), and The Fortune Hunter (1927).

Warner Brothers' The Better 'Ole (1926) is perhaps Syd's best-known film today because of his characterisation of Old Bill, adapted from a World War I character created by cartoonist Bruce Bairnsfather. Also, this was the second Warner Bros. film to have a Vitaphone soundtrack. This film is believed by many to have the first spoken word of dialogue in film, "coffee", although other historians disagree.

Syd Chaplin returned to England, where he made his first film for British International Pictures (BIP), A Little Bit of Fluff (1928). This proved to be his final film. In 1929, as he was to begin work on a second film for the studio, Mumming Birds, he was accused of sexual assault by actress Molly Wright. BIP settled out of court, which appeared to concede the truth of Wright's claims. Following the scandal, Chaplin left England again and moved to continental Europe, leaving a string of unpaid tax demands. By 1930 he was declared bankrupt.

== Personal life and death ==
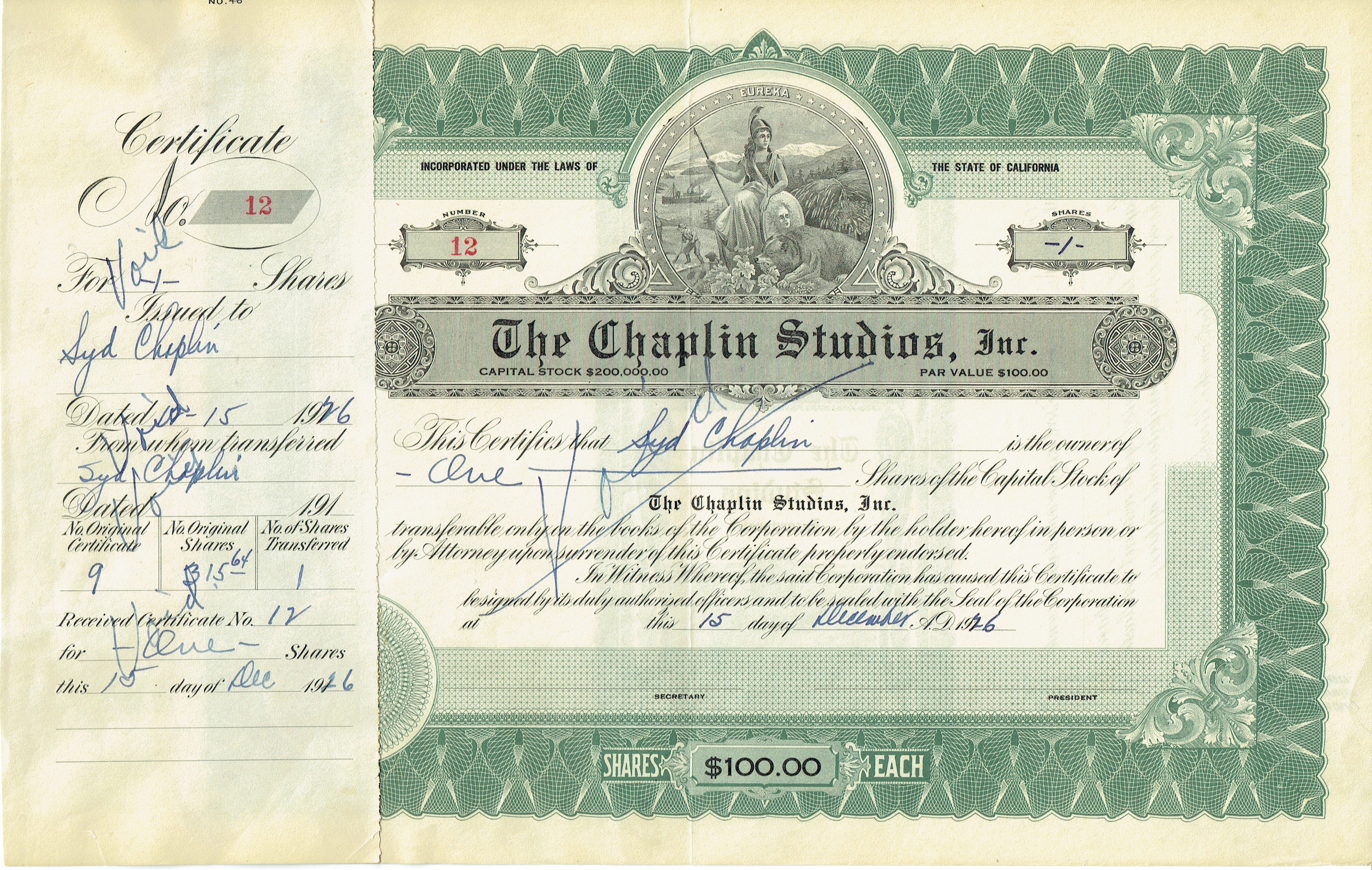
Share of the Chaplin Studios, Inc., issued 15. December 1926, assigned to Syd Chaplin

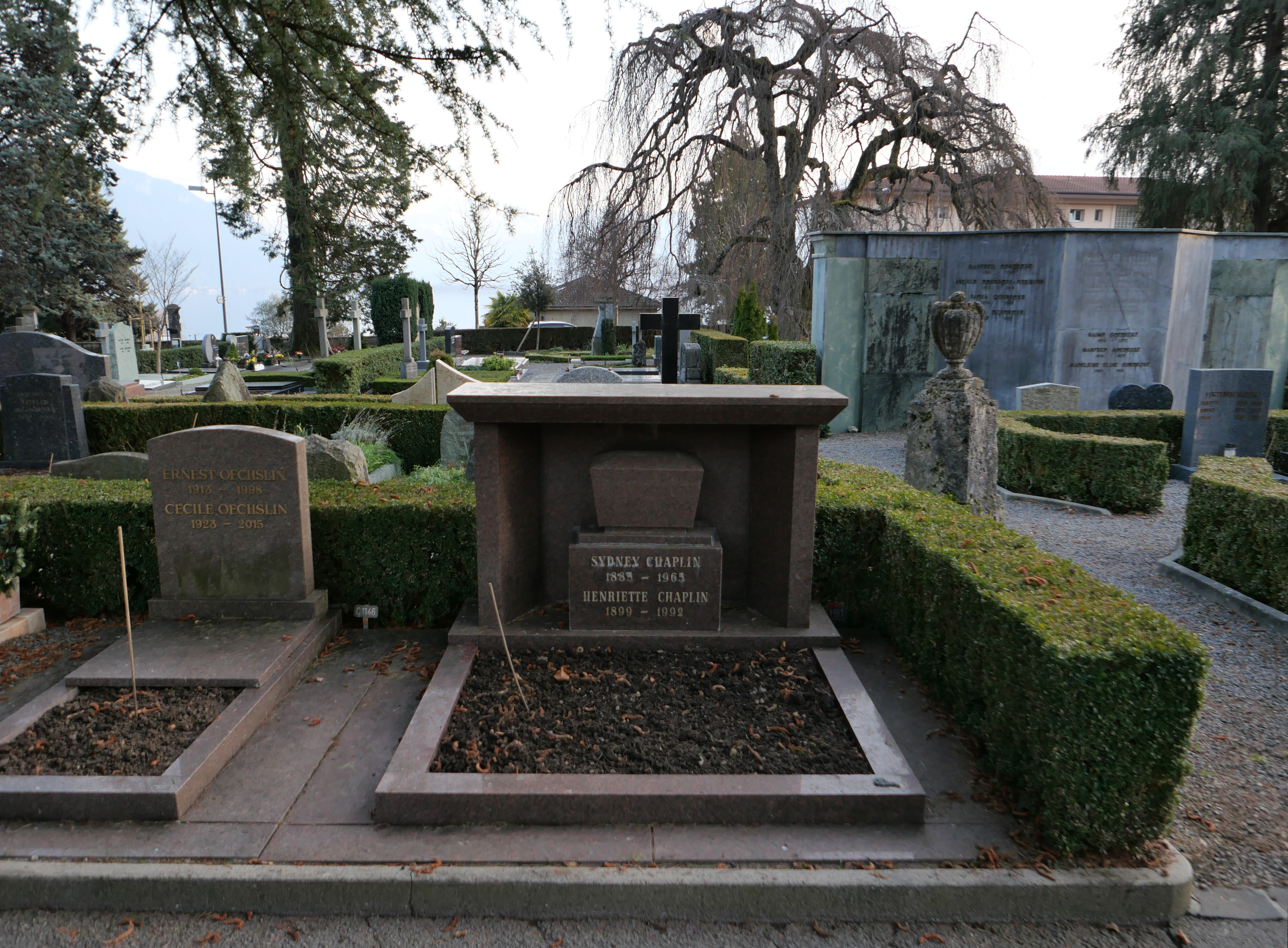
The tomb of Sydney and Henriette Chaplin.

Chaplin married twice and had no children. He married his first wife, Minnie, in England in 1908. She was diagnosed with breast cancer and died in France in September 1936 following surgery for the illness. After World War II, Chaplin lived most of his final years in Europe. He married again, to Henriette Leoneanu (nicknamed Gypsy, by Chaplin) c.1941.

After a long illness, he died one month after his 80th birthday, on his half-brother Charlie's 76th birthday, on 16 April 1965, in Nice, France. Gypsy survived him. Chaplin is buried in Clarens-Montreux Cemetery, near Vevey. After Gypsy died in 1992, she was buried beside him.

== In popular culture ==
Sydney Chaplin was portrayed as a teenager by actor Nicholas Gatt and as an adult by actor Paul Rhys in Richard Attenborough's Chaplin. The film explored his personal and professional relationship with Charlie.

== Filmography ==
=== Keystone Studios (1914–1915) ===
At Keystone, Chaplin created the recurring character "Gussle."

Year	Title	Role	Notes
1914	Fatty's Wine Party	Waiter	
1914	Among the Mourners	The Minister	
1914	Gussle's Day in Court	Gussle	
1915	Gussle's Backward Way	Gussle	
1915	Gussle's Day of Rest	Gussle	
1915	Gussle Rivals Jonah	Gussle	
1915	Gussle's Wayward Path	Gussle	
1915	Gussle Tied to Trouble	Gussle	
1915	A Submarine Pirate	The Inventor / The Pirate	One of Keystone's highest-grossing films.
1915	That Little Band of Gold	The Waiter	

=== Collaborations with Charlie Chaplin (1918–1923) ===
Sydney played key supporting roles in several of his brother's most famous films produced for First National Pictures.

Year	Title	Role	Notes
1918	A Dog's Life	Owner of Lunch Wagon	
1918	Shoulder Arms	Sergeant / The Kaiser	
1918	The Bond	The Kaiser	Short film for Liberty Loan committee.
1921	The Kid	Man in Shelter / Guest	Also served as Production Manager.
1922	Pay Day	The Foreman	
1923	The Pilgrim	Father on Train	

=== Late Career and Features (1925–1928) ===
Year	Title	Role	Notes
1925	Charley's Aunt	Sir Fancourt Babberley	His most successful feature film.
1925	The Man on the Box	Bob Warburton	
1926	The Better 'Ole	Old Bill	Early Vitaphone synchronized sound film.
1926	Oh! What a Nurse!	Jerry Townsend	
1927	The Missing Link	Arthur Saunders	
1927	The Fortune Hunter	Nat Duncan	Lost film
1928	A Little Bit of Fluff	Bertram Tully	Filmed in the UK; also known as Skirts.
