= Old Bill and Son =

- Directed by: Ian Dalrymple
- Screenplay by: Captain Bruce Bairnsfather; Ian Dalrymple; Arthur Wimperis (additional dialogue); Derek Twist (assistant scenarist)
- Based on: story Old Bill by Bruce Bairnsfather
- Produced by: Josef Somlo; Harold Boxall; Alexander Korda (uncredited)
- Starring: Morland Graham; John Mills; Mary Clare
- Cinematography: Georges Perinal
- Edited by: Charles Crichton
- Music by: Richard Addinsell (music of the French song); Stephen Haggard (words of the French song); Muir Mathieson (musical director)
- Production company: Legeran Films
- Distributed by: General Film Distributors (UK)
- Release date: 1 March 1941 (UK)
- Running time: 96 minutes
- Country: United Kingdom
- Language: English

Old Bill and Son is a 1941 British black-and-white comedy war film directed by Ian Dalrymple and starring Morland Graham, John Mills, Mary Clare and Ronald Shiner. It was written by Captain Bruce Bairnsfather, Dalrymple, Arthur Wimperis and Derek Twist, based on the story Old Bill by Bairnsfather. It was executive produced by Alexander Korda for Legeran Films.

== Plot ==
Old Bill, an old First World War soldier, argues with his son Young Bill about the latter not holding down a job. Soon afterwards the Second World War breaks out and Young Bill and the family lodger Sally both join up. Envious of them and despite his wife Maggie's entreaties not to, Old Bill attempts to join up but is turned down at the recruiting office and by his old commanding officer, who Old Bill had hoped would pull strings for him. He is finally successful, joining the Royal Pioneer Corps, and both he and his son are sent to France. There Old Bill helps his son dig a Universal Carrier out of the mud and meets his long-lost friend Canuck, a poilu in the previous war and now a hotelier, and his daughter Françoise.

Young Bill attempts to woo Françoise against competition from another soldier who – unlike him – can speak French. He also tricks his father into sleeping in a bed at Canuck's hotel which has actually been reserved by the colonel of Young Bill's regiment, but takes the blame when the colonel discovers the ruse. The colonel turns out to have a lieutenant in Old Bill's First World War regiment and so gets him attached to Young Bill's regiment. Soon afterwards a letter arrives from Maggie stating that she too has joined up.

Sally arrives at the Bills' base again as driver to the singer Stella Malloy, who has been sent to the wrong unit for a concert party, so the colonel has Old Bill organise one for his regiment instead. Young Bill bids farewell to his father, stating that his affections have returned from Françoise to Sally, just before joining a squad from the regiment on a raid to capture a German prisoner. He does not return from the raid and Old Bill and Canuck go to find him, only to find him and a friend guarding a large group of German prisoners. They march the prisoners back to base together as Canuck and the two Bills discuss the differences between German soldiers and those of free nations such as Britain and France.

== Cast ==
- Morland Graham as Old Bill
- John Mills as young Bill Busby
- Mary Clare as Maggie
- Renée Houston as Stella Malloy
- Rene Ray as Sally
- Gus McNaughton as Alf
- Ronald Shiner as Herbert 'Bert' Smith
- Manning Whiley as Chimp
- Janine Darcey as Françoise
- Roland Culver as Colonel
- Donald Stuart as Canuck
- Nicholas Phipps as BBC reporter
- Allan Jeayes as Willoughby

== Critical reception ==
The Monthly Film Bulletin wrote: "Though the story is slender the direction is brisk and the present-day patriotic fervour is well brought out both in light-hearted and more serious sequences. The acting is competent, Morland Graham and John Mills making good use of their opportunities as Father and Son respectively. Rene Ray is well cast as Sally, and the smaller parts are all adequately filled."

Kine Weekly wrote: "Morland Graham contributes a true-to-life character study as the likeable, loyal and wily Old Bill, and John Mills is equally good as Young Bill. The supporting types, too, are naturally and authentically etched. The detail, both at home and at the Front, has a neat touch of realism. The complete build-up is topical, human, vigorous, and essentially and refreshingly English comedy entertainment of wide appeal."

Variety wrote: "Reaching into the past for an old reliable, producers Josef Somlo and Harold Boxall have done a nice job. ... Picture is a sort of Lambeth Walk treatment in khaki, lavish with Cockney humor, types and dialog to wow them this side. Yet, in that same makeup it constitutes difficult fare to forecast as perceptible US entertainment. In its sidelight on typical Britishers reacting in typical fashion to war, its airy, slaphappy viewing of troop-life under these actual conditions, Americans may find much in it for a chuckle."
