= The Bond (1918 film) =

1918 film by Charlie Chaplin

- Directed by: Charlie Chaplin
- Written by: Charlie Chaplin
- Starring: Charlie Chaplin; Edna Purviance; Albert Austin; Sydney Chaplin
- Production companies: Charles Chaplin Productions; Liberty Loan Committee
- Distributed by: First National Pictures Inc.
- Release date: 1918
- Running time: 11 minutes
- Country: United States
- Languages: Silent film English intertitles

The Bond

The Bond is a 1918 two-reel propaganda film created by Charlie Chaplin at his own expense for the Liberty Loan Committee for theatrical release to help sell U.S. Liberty Bonds during World War I.

Made in 1918 with Edna Purviance, Albert Austin and Sydney Chaplin, the film has a distinctive visual motif set in a simple plain black set with starkly lit simple props and arrangements. The story is a series of sketches humorously illustrating various bonds like the bond of friendship and of marriage and, most important, the Liberty Bond, to K.O. the Kaiser which Charlie does literally.

That theme is made explicit when Charlie meets Uncle Sam and a laborer representing industry. Charlie buys a liberty bond and the industrial laborer supplies a rifle for an American soldier. Charlie is sufficiently impressed by the result of his patriotic contribution that he reveals more funds he had hidden in his pants to buy another bond and an American Naval sailor is thus equipped with a rifle himself.

There was also a British version with Uncle Sam replaced by John Bull and promotes War Bonds.

== Cast ==
- Albert Austin as Friend
- Henry Bergman as John Bull (British version)
- Charles Chaplin as Charlie
- Sydney Chaplin as The Kaiser
- Joan Marsh as Cupid
- Edna Purviance as Charlie's Wife/Liberty
- Tom Wilson as Industry
