= Charles Reisner =

American director and actor (1887–1962)

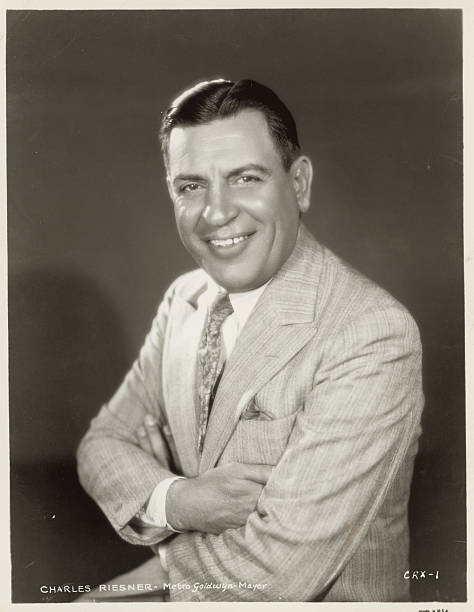
- Reisner in 1926
- Born: Charles Francis Reisner; March 14, 1887; Minneapolis, Minnesota, U.S.
- Died: September 24, 1962 (aged 75); La Jolla, California, U.S.
- Other name: Charles Riesner
- Years active: 1916–1950
- Children: Dean Riesner

Charles Francis Reisner (March 14, 1887 – September 24, 1962) was an American film director and actor of the 1920s and 1930s.

The German-American directed over 60 films between 1920 and 1950 and acted in over 20 films between 1916 and 1929. He starred with Charlie Chaplin in A Dog's Life in 1918 and The Kid in 1921.

He directed Buster Keaton (Keaton also co-directed it with him) in Steamboat Bill, Jr. (1928). During the late 1920s, through the 1940s, Reisner was under contract to Metro-Goldwyn-Mayer. In 1930, he directed Chasing Rainbows, a musical which starred Bessie Love and Charles King. He directed The Big Store (1941), the Marx Brothers' last film for MGM.

Reisner died of a heart attack in La Jolla, California in 1962 at the age of 75.

== Filmography ==
=== As actor ===
- A Dog's Life (1918)
- The Kid (1921)
- The Pilgrim (1923)
- Hollywood (1923)
- Her Temporary Husband (1923)
- Breaking Into Society (1923)
- Fight and Win (1924)
- A Self-Made Failure (1924)
- Justice of the Far North (1925)

=== As director ===
- The Man on the Box (1925)
- Oh! What a Nurse! (1926)
- The Better 'Ole (1926)
- What Every Girl Should Know (1927)
- The Missing Link (1927)
- The Fortune Hunter (1927)
- Steamboat Bill, Jr. (1928)
- Fools for Luck (1928)
- Brotherly Love (1928)
- China Bound (1929)
- Noisy Neighbors (1929)
- The Hollywood Revue of 1929 (1929)
- Chasing Rainbows (1930)
- Caught Short (1930)
- Love in the Rough (1930)
- The March of Time (1930)
- Reducing (1931)
- Stepping Out (1931)
- Politics (1931)
- Flying High (1931)
- Divorce in the Family (1932)
- The Chief (1933)
- Whistling in the Dark (1933)
- You Can't Buy Everything (1934)
- The Show-Off (1934)
- Student Tour (1934)
- The Winning Ticket (1935)
- It's in the Air (1935)
- Everybody Dance (1936)
- Murder Goes to College (1937)
- Sophie Lang Goes West (1937)
- Manhattan Merry-Go-Round (1937)
- Winter Carnival (1939)
- The Big Store (1941)
- This Time for Keeps (1942)
- Harrigan's Kid (1943)
- Meet the People (1943)
- Lost in a Harem (1944)
- In This Corner (1948)
- The Cobra Strikes (1948)
- The Traveling Saleswoman (1950)
