= The Man on the Box (1925 film) =

1925 film

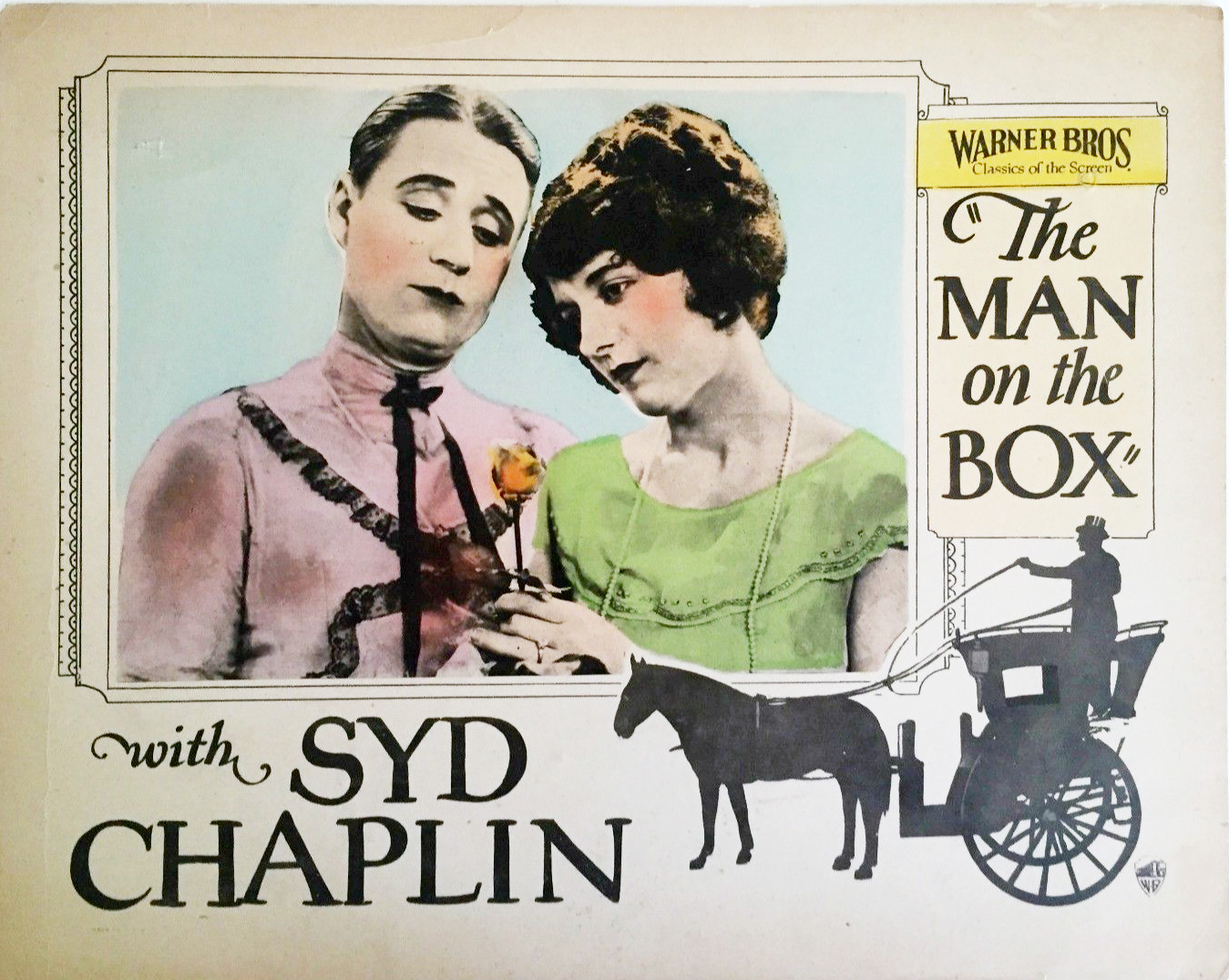
- Lobby card
- Directed by: Charles Reisner
- Screenplay by: Charles Logue
- Based on: The Man on the Box by Harold MacGrath
- Starring: Sydney Chaplin; David Butler; Alice Calhoun; Cathleen Calhoun; Theodore Lorch; Helene Costello
- Cinematography: Nicholas T. Barrows
- Edited by: Ray Enright
- Production company: Warner Bros.
- Distributed by: Warner Bros.
- Release date: October 11, 1925
- Running time: 80 minutes
- Country: United States
- Language: Silent (English intertitles)
- Budget: $163,000
- Box office: $488,000

The Man on the Box (1925)

The Man on the Box is a 1925 American comedy film directed by Charles Reisner and written by Charles Logue. It is based on the 1904 novel The Man on the Box by Harold MacGrath. The film stars Sydney Chaplin, David Butler, Alice Calhoun, Cathleen Calhoun, Theodore Lorch, and Helene Costello. The film was released by Warner Bros. on October 11, 1925.

== Plot ==
Bob Warburton, a wealthy young bachelor, falls in love with Betty Annesly and, in order to be close to her, is hired as a gardener by her father, Colonel Annesley. However, the girl discovers the trick of her admirer and, to teach him a lesson, insists that the new gardener serve at the table during an important lunch. Bob refuses the task and so is replaced by Count Karloff's butler who offers, for the occasion, to lend it to the landlord. Bob realizes that Badkoff, the butler, is an enemy agent tasked with stealing secret helicopter plans from Betty's father. Disguised as a waitress, Bob puts a spoke in the wheel of the spy, saving the precious documents. Eventually, he also wins over beautiful Betty, taking her to the altar.

== Cast ==
- Sydney Chaplin as Bob Warburton
- David Butler as Bob's Brother-in-Law
- Alice Calhoun as Betty Annesly
- Cathleen Calhoun as Mrs. Lampton
- Theodore Lorch as Mr. Lampton
- Helene Costello as Bob's Sister
- E. J. Ratcliffe as Colonel Annesly
- Charles Reisner as Badkoff
- Charles K. Gerrard as Count Karaloff
- Henry A. Barrows as Warburton Sr.

== Box office ==
According to Warner Bros records the film earned $425,000 domestically and $63,000 foreign.

== Preservation ==
Abridged copies of The Man on the Box are held by George Eastman House and UCLA Film & Television Archive.
