= The Fortune Hunter (1927 film) =

1927 film by Charles Reisner

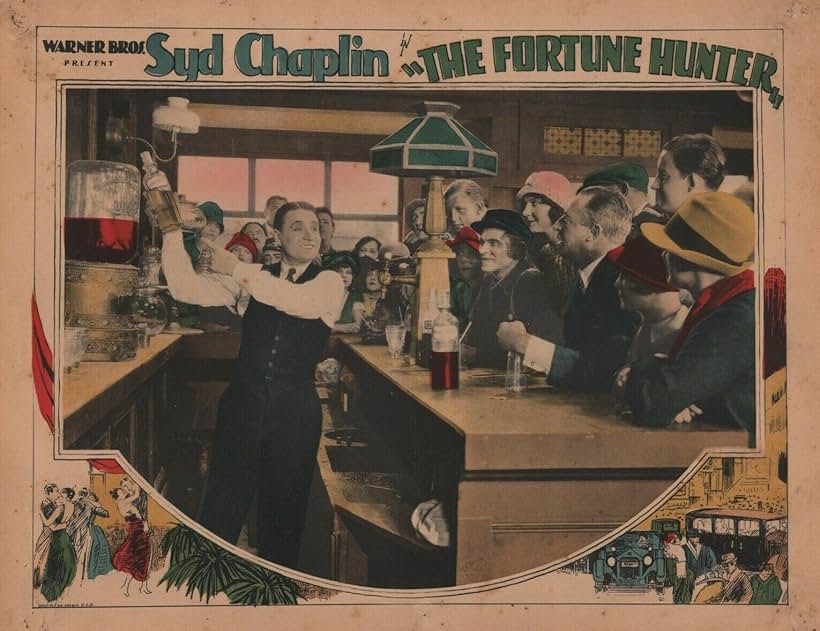
- Lobby card
- Directed by: Charles Reisner; Sandy Roth (ass't director)
- Written by: Bryan Foy; Robert Dillon
- Based on: play The Fortune Hunter by Winchell Smith c.1909
- Starring: Syd Chaplin
- Cinematography: Edwin B. DuPar
- Production company: Warner Bros.
- Distributed by: Warner Bros.
- Release date: November 7, 1927
- Running time: 7 reels
- Country: USA
- Languages: Sound (Synchronized) (English Intertitles)
- Budget: $197,000
- Box office: $334,000

The Fortune Hunter is a lost 1927 synchronized sound film comedy directed by Charles Reisner and starring Syd Chaplin. It is based on the 1909 Broadway play The Fortune Hunter by Winchell Smith. While the film has no audible dialogue, it was released with a synchronized musical score with sound effects using the Vitaphone sound-on-disc process. The film was produced by Warner Bros.

== Plot ==
Nat Duncan, a fast-talking bouncer at the rowdy and violent Ring Café, gets a surprise visit from his friend and fellow former panhandler, Handsome Harry West. Now decked out in fine clothes and accompanying a wealthy older woman, Harry boasts of having "married rich," and suggests that Nat try to do the same.

Harry's pitch is simple: use charm to marry money, then split the proceeds 50-50. Though skeptical, Nat agrees and is soon outfitted with new clothes, a wad of cash, a one-way train ticket to sleepy Radville, and a pocket guide to wooing heiresses. Step one? Join a church.

Nat arrives in Radville and reinvents himself as a soft-spoken yet deep-pocketed pillar of virtue. Through exhibiting manners and making generous church donations, Nat gains a local reputation. His exaggerated decency attracts Josie Lockwood, daughter of stern banker Blinky.

But Nat's heart is swayed in a different direction when he meets Betty Graham, daughter of the kindly village druggist, Sam Graham. Sam has mortgaged his future on a homemade invention that promises to convert crude oil into gasoline—but business has suffered, and the drugstore is on the brink of collapse. Nat steps in, becoming a half-owner and injecting new life into the shop with city-style promotions and stock ordered on credit. Profits climb, and Betty is sent off to finishing school with renewed hope for the future.

Months pass. At the height of Radville's annual garden party and church bazaar, the newly respected Nat Duncan is the guest of honor. But the peace is short-lived—Handsome Harry shows up, now broke after discovering his wife's supposed fortune was little more than a shoebox of IOUs. Spotting Josie's continued interest in Nat, Harry demands his share of their original agreement. Nat, however, has had a change of heart—he wants to marry for love, not profit—and tries to sever ties with Harry.

Enraged, Harry turns to sabotage. He informs banker Lockwood that Nat loves Josie but is too shy to propose. Delighted, Blinky publicly announces the engagement—without Nat's consent. Josie is overjoyed. Betty, now returned from school, is heartbroken. And Nat is trapped.

To escape this matrimonial ambush, Nat cooks up a plan. He sets up a dressmaker's dummy on his parlor couch, arranges himself beside it in a suggestive pose, and pantomimes a petting party, whispering sweet nothings and hugging the lifeless figure with theatrical passion. The ruse works perfectly: Blinky Lockwood barges in, sees the scene, and—outraged by Nat's apparent betrayal of Josie—breaks off the engagement.

With the coast clear, Nat turns to the girl who's truly captured his heart: Betty. He proposes, this time with sincerity and no dummy in sight. She says yes. Nat throws away his rulebook on gold digging and picks up a different kind of guide—“How to Love Your Wife”—determined to become not just a clever schemer, but a devoted husband.

== Cast ==
- Sydney Chaplin as Nat Duncan
- Helene Costello as Josie Lockwood
- Clara Horton as Betty Graham
- Duke Martin as Handsome Harry West
- Thomas Jefferson as Sam Graham
- Erville Alderson as Blinky Lockwood
- Paul Kruger as Roland
- Nora Cecil as Betty Carpenter
- Louise Carver as Drygoods store owner
- Bob Perry as Sheriff
- Babe London as Waitress

== Box Office ==
According to Warner Bros records the film earned $215,000 domestically and $119,000 foreign.

== See also ==
- List of early sound feature films (1926–1929)
- List of early Warner Bros. sound and talking features
