= Oh! What a Nurse! =

1926 film

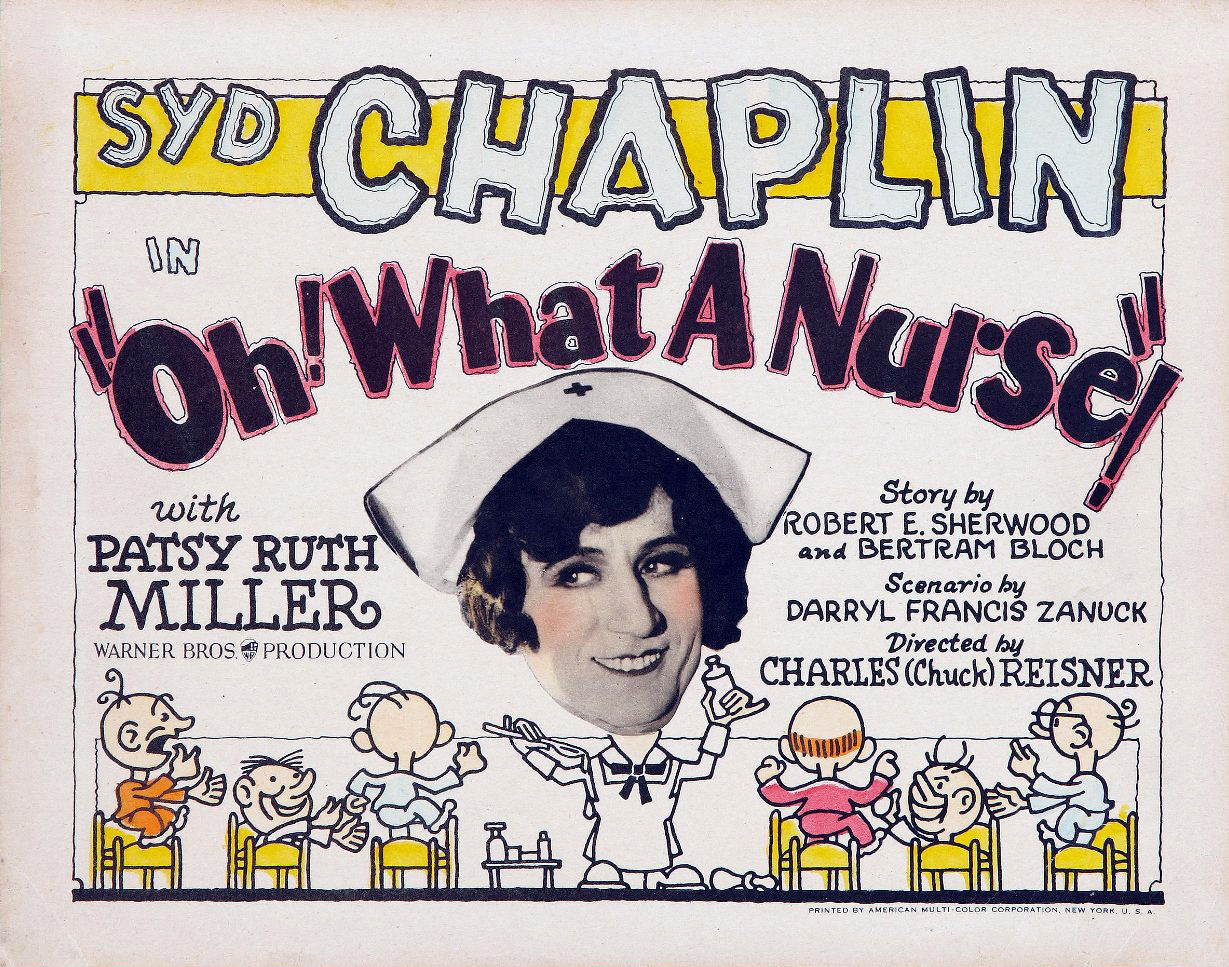
- Lobby card
- Directed by: Charles Reisner
- Screenplay by: Darryl F. Zanuck
- Story by: Bertram Bloch; Robert E. Sherwood
- Starring: Sydney Chaplin; Patsy Ruth Miller; Gayne Whitman; Matthew Betz; Edith Yorke; David Torrence
- Cinematography: John J. Mescall
- Production company: Warner Bros.
- Distributed by: Warner Bros.
- Release date: March 7, 1926
- Running time: 70 minutes
- Country: United States
- Language: Silent (English intertitles)
- Budget: $211,000
- Box office: $439,000

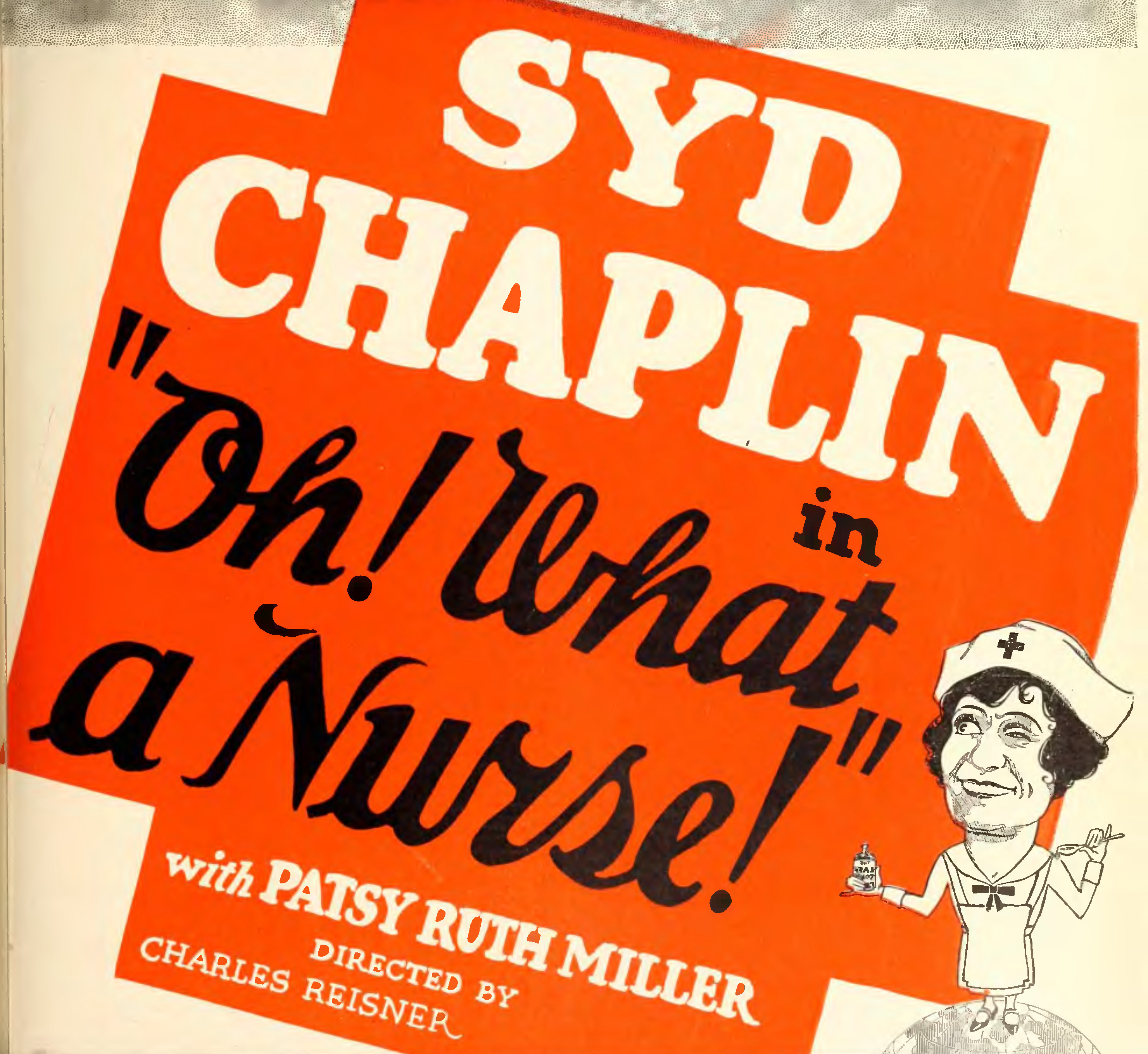
Oh! What a Nurse! ad in Motion Picture News, 1926

Oh! What a Nurse! is a 1926 American silent comedy film directed by Charles Reisner and written by Darryl F. Zanuck. The film stars Sydney Chaplin, Patsy Ruth Miller, Gayne Whitman, Matthew Betz, Edith Yorke, and David Torrence. The film was released by Warner Bros. on March 7, 1926. The film is extant.

== Plot ==
As described in a film magazine review, newspaper cub-reporter Jerry Clark substitutes for the love expert column writer Dolly Whimple and advises June Harrison not to marry Clive Hunt. Fate compels him to impersonate Dolly and he becomes a violently pursued victim in a hurtling series of events that finally transforms him into a vivacious nurse. In this role he runs against other adventures, his several hair breadth escapes, but finally emerges from the cross-dressing mix-up triumphant, with June engaged to marry him.

== Cast ==
- Sydney Chaplin as Jerry Clark
- Patsy Ruth Miller as June Harrison
- Gayne Whitman as Clive Hunt
- Matthew Betz as Captain Ladye Kirby
- Edith Yorke as Mrs. Clark
- David Torrence as Big Tim Harrison
- Edgar Kennedy as Eric Johnson
- Raymond Wells as Mate
- Henry A. Barrows as Newspaper editor

== Box office ==
According to Warner Bros. records the film earned $370,000 domestically and $69,000 foreign.
