= The Better 'Ole =

- or The Romance of Old Bill
- Arthur Bourchier as Old Bill
- Music: Herman Darewski
- Lyrics: Percival Knight; James Heard
- Book: Bruce Bairnsfather; Arthur Elliot
- Basis: Old Bill
- Productions: 1917 London; 1917 UK tour 1918 Broadway; International productions

The Better 'Ole, also called The Romance of Old Bill, is an Edwardian musical comedy with a book by Bruce Bairnsfather and Arthur Elliot, music by Herman Darewski, and lyrics by Percival Knight and James Heard, based on the cartoon character Old Bill, an infantryman, drawn by Bairnsfather. In the musical, Old Bill intercepts a spy's plan to destroy a bridge, trapping a French regiment after they cross it. Bill saves them by blowing up the bridge before they pass; his actions are misunderstood, however, and he is arrested for disobeying orders and holding an enemy document. After Victoire explains the situation, Bill is released and given a medal.

The original London production in 1917 was a hit, running for over 800 performances, starring Arthur Bourchier as Old Bill. The piece also had success on tour and on Broadway the following year and spawned two film adaptations and a sequel.

== Productions ==
London and original tour
On 4 August 1917, The Better 'Ole opened in London at the Oxford Music Hall, where it ran for 811 performances, starring Arthur Bourchier as Old Bill. It was produced by Charles B. Cochran. After the success of the London production was apparent, a provincial touring company was formed, led by Martin Adeson as Old Bill.

Broadway
It later also ran successfully on Broadway, where Charles Coburn starred as Old Bill opposite his wife, who played Victoire; the couple are also credited as the producers of the Broadway production. The production first played downtown at the Greenwich Village Theatre, then moved to Broadway at the Cort Theatre and later the Booth Theatre. Choreographed by Lily Leonora, the show played from 19 October 1918 to 4 October 1919, lasting 353 performances. Sets were designed by the painter Ernest Albert.

Subsequent productions
By 1919, five productions of the "smashing success" were running in North America (including the New York premiere). Besides Coburn in New York, these productions starred De Wolf Hopper, Maclyn Arbuckle, Edmund Gurney and James K. Hackett as Old Bill in Chicago, Philadelphia, Boston and Canada, respectively.

== Plot ==
Peggy Foster as Victoire

Setting: France and England during World War I

The Times commented that there was not much plot, and what there was did not matter much. The Play Pictorial gave the following plot summary:

[T]here is but one dramatic episode in the piece. … It is the acquisition of the Spy's letter containing the information as to the mining of the bridge over which the French are going to attack, when with the aid of Victoire Bill realises its purport, he determines to frustrate the enemy's intention by blowing up the bridge in advance. His mission fulfilled, he finds himself under arrest for disobedience to orders; he is further compromised by the possession of an incriminating enemy document; death by a firing party at dawn appears to be his imminent fate. But a kindlier fate has interposed in the person of Victoire. She has gone to the French Headquarters with the story of his gallantry, and an officer of the French Staff arrives, bearing with him the glorious Cross of Honour.

== Musical numbers ==
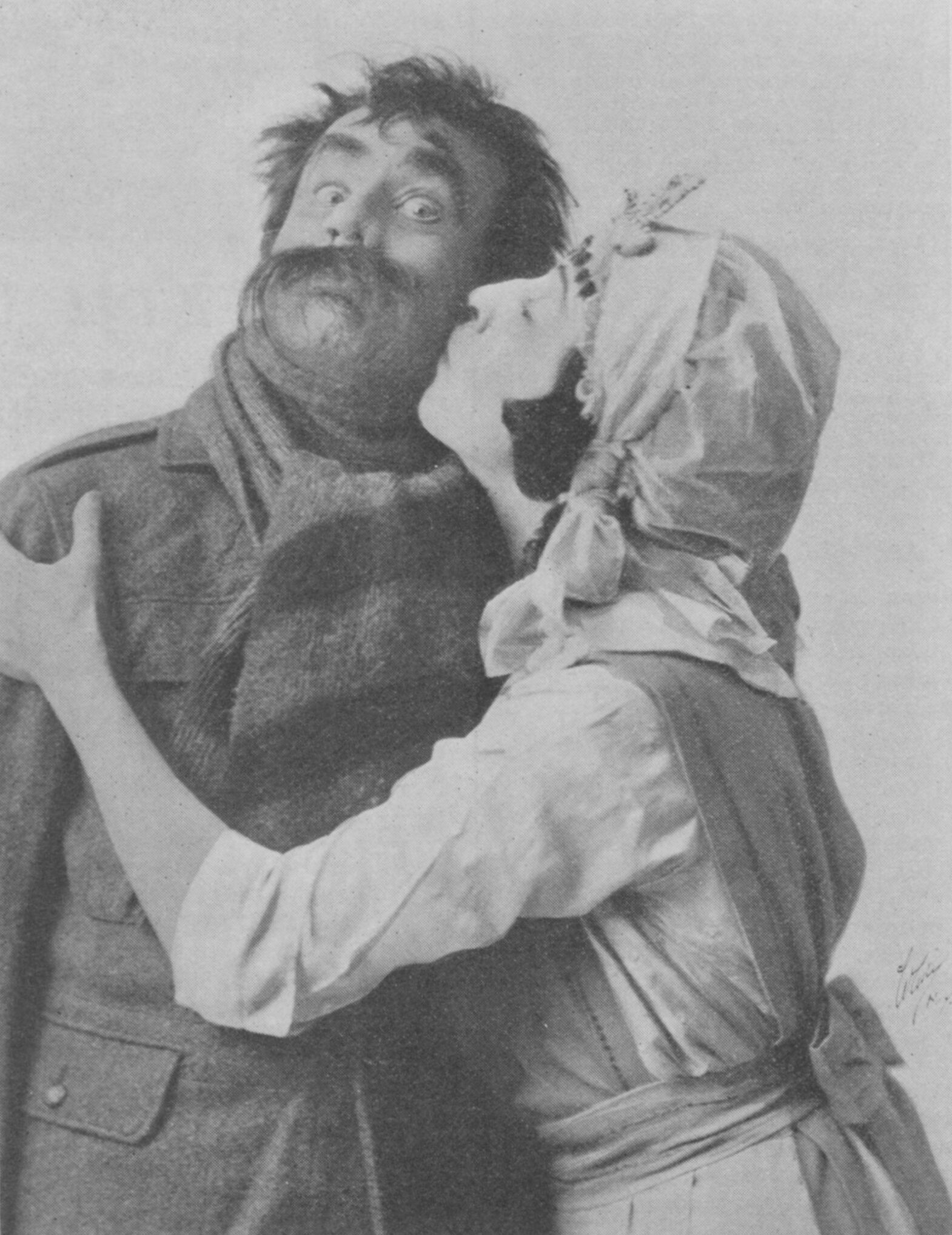
Scene from a 1919 touring production of The Better 'Ole

These songs were used in the New York production:

- "Tommy" – Suzette from France and Tommies
- "That Trip Across the Rhine" – Captain of the Women's Workers' Camp and Women War Workers
- "Carrying On" – Bert, Alf and Old Bill
- "We Wish We Was in Blighty" – Bert, Alf and Old Bill
- "When You Look in the Heart of a Rose" – Company
- "Venus de Milo" – Old Bill
- "Je Sais Que Vous Etes Gentil" ("I Know You Are Nice") – Berthe and Bert (interpolated song by Henri Christiné)
- "Regiment of Our Own" – Bert and French Girls
- "Regiment of Our Own" (reprise) – Bert and Mollie from Ireland

== Roles and original casts ==
The list below shows first the London, then the New York casts:

- Old Bill – Arthur Bourchier; Charles D. Coburn
- Victoire – Edmée Dormeuil (later, Peggy Foster); Mrs. Charles D. Coburn
- Bert – Tom Woottwell; Charles McNaughton
- Alf – Sinclair Cottee; Colin Campbell
- Spy – M. Crommelynck; Lark Taylor
- Angele – Chris Birss; Gwen Louis
- Suzette – Glory Edgar; Mona Desmond
- W.A.A.C. – Hilda Denton; Lillian Spenser
- Berthe – Carrie Rose; Helen Tilden

== Critical reception ==
In The Play Pictorial, B. W. Findon wrote, "Old Bill stands out with the vividness of a Shakespearean creation, as forcible as Falstaff, as quaint as Dogberry. It is for this reason that he has caught the imagination of the public, that he attracts myriads to the Oxford and fills them with the glory of their race. … A great entertainment, in brief; a revue of the war most admirable. It will be a prodigious success in America and the far lands. We have had nothing like it, I repeat, and assuredly there is here that which will make the whole civilised world akin." The Times commented, "The Bairnsfather jokes are as amusing on the stage as they are when printed." The Observer said of Bourchier's depiction of Old Bill, "If others have been more sardonic and incisive, he is more good-natured and appealing." The paper thought the piece "unduly spun out, perhaps, because there is a limit to the humorous side of war."

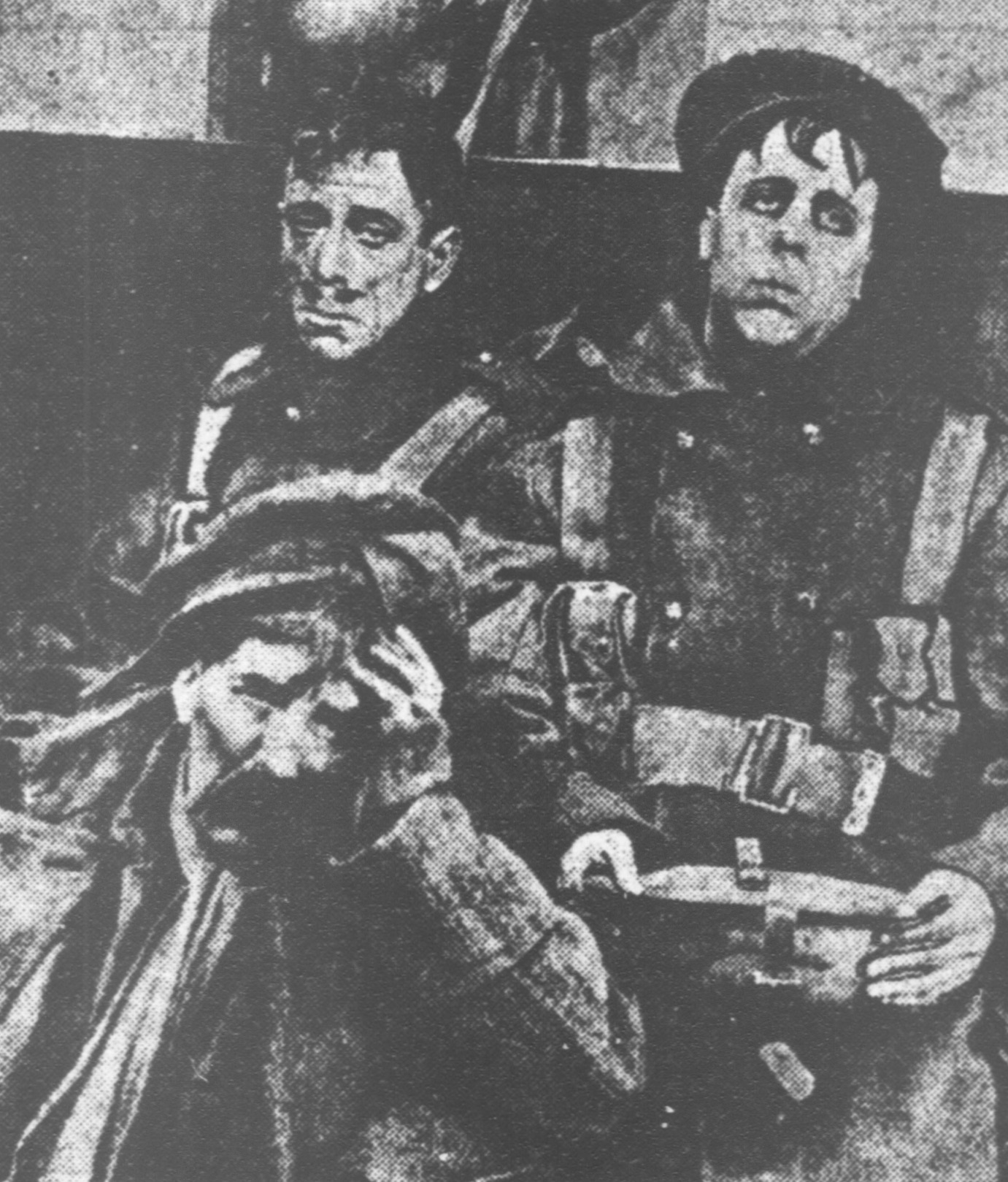
Scene from 1919 film.

Of the New York production, The New York Times wrote that it "sweeps an audience off its feet by the sheer force of sincerity. Sooner or later everyone will see it and those will be fortunate to do so while it retains the bloom of its first inspiration".

== Adaptations and sequel ==
Two film adaptations of the musical were made during the silent film era. The first, a 1918 British version, The Romance of Old Bill, stars Charles Rock. The second version is a 1926 Warner Bros. film, The Better 'Ole, which was the second feature film to use the Vitaphone sound process, and stars Sydney Chaplin as Old Bill.

The success of the musical led to a West End sequel, Old Bill, M.P., which opened at the Lyceum Theatre on 12 July 1922. Old Bill was played by Edmund Gwenn, and Bairnsfather appeared as himself. Unlike The Better 'Ole, the later piece was not a musical. It ran until 11 November 1922.
