= The Missing Link (1927 film) =

1927 film

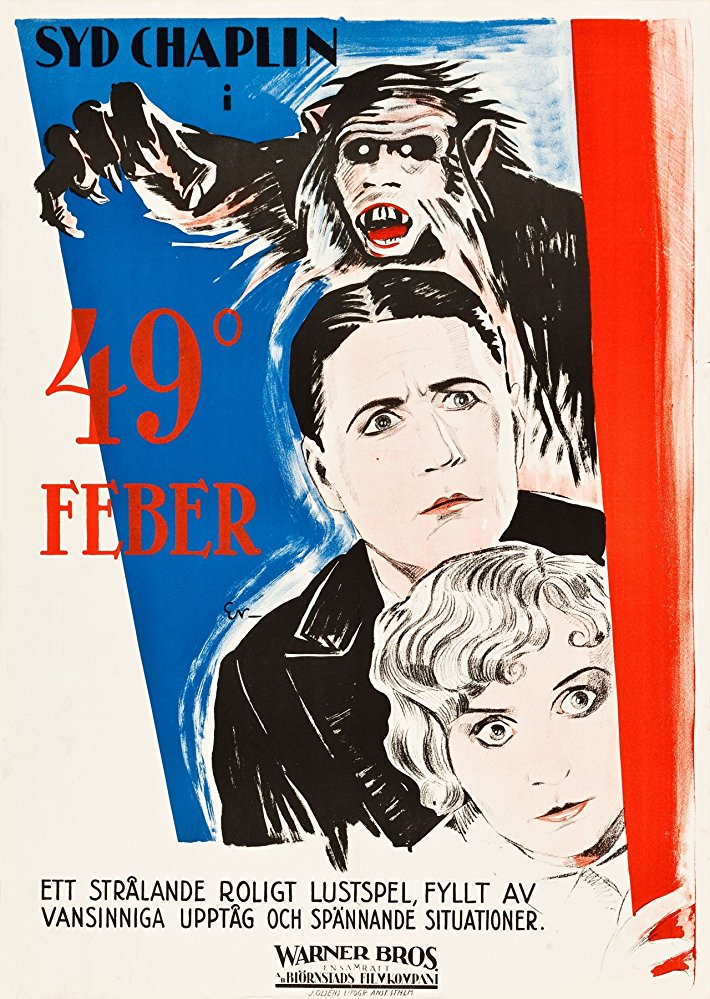
- Swedish release poster
- Directed by: Charles Reisner
- Written by: Charles Reisner; Darryl F. Zanuck
- Starring: Syd Chaplin; Ruth Hiatt; Tom McGuire
- Cinematography: Devereaux Jennings
- Music by: Erno Rapee
- Production company: Warner Bros.
- Distributed by: Warner Bros.
- Release date: May 6, 1927
- Running time: 70 minutes
- Country: United States
- Languages: Sound (synchronized) (English intertitles)
- Budget: $313,000
- Box office: $608,000

The Missing Link is a 1927 American synchronized sound comedy film directed by Charles Reisner and starring Syd Chaplin, Ruth Hiatt and Tom McGuire. While the film has no audible dialog, it was released with a synchronized musical score with sound effects using the Vitaphone sound-on-disc process. The title of the film is a reference to the idea of the "missing link" that connects man and the ape. A print exists at the Gosfilmofond film archive.

== Plot ==
Arthur Wells, a timid daydreamer with poetic ambitions and a chronic fear of almost everything, earns his keep working as a baggage porter in "Lunon," where he's often mocked for being more skittish than strong. One day, while clumsily hauling trunks aboard a steamer bound for Africa, Arthur is startled by a monkey leaping onto his shoulders. In a panic, he bolts into the nearest private cabin—unwittingly barging in on the famously aloof Lord Melville Dryden, a hardened British explorer and confirmed woman-hater.

Dryden, en route to rendezvous with his partner Colonel Braden in a high-stakes expedition to track down "The Missing Link", receives a distressing telegram. It seems Braden's daughter, Beatrice Braden, has become infatuated with the rugged adventurer and plans to meet him with wide-eyed adoration. Wanting nothing to do with romantic entanglements, the sly Dryden hatches a plan: he convinces the unwitting Wells to impersonate him for the duration of the voyage—passing off the stammering, fudge-loving poet as the fearless Lord Dryden.

Once in Africa, Arthur bumbles his way into Beatrice's heart. Despite being utterly unsuited for safari life, his bumbling charm, vulnerability, and poetic soul strike a chord with the bright and spirited Beatrice. While Arthur falls hard for her, he's thrown off by her forward behavior during one peculiar moment on a couch—unaware that her affectionate pawing is actually the work of Akka, a mischievous chimpanzee obsessed with the fudge in Arthur's pocket. The misunderstanding makes him fall for her all the more.

When Colonel Braden and the rest of the expedition prepare to head into the jungle to capture the elusive "Missing Link," Arthur—desperate to escape the danger—fakes a sudden illness and locks himself in his room. But even there, peace is impossible. Akka sneaks in again, terrifying Arthur until he traps the monkey in a cupboard. Mistaking the chimp for the legendary beast, he triumphantly declares, "I’ve captured The Missing Link!" But while he fetches the others, Akka escapes, leaving Arthur looking mad to everyone else.

Meanwhile, word reaches the camp that the real Missing Link is on the loose. Still believing Akka to be the culprit, Arthur arms himself with fudge and heads off to “recapture” the cuddly culprit—only to find himself face-to-face with a pack of lions. Fleeing in terror back to camp, he sets off a wild chase that culminates in the dramatic entrance of the actual Missing Link—a hulking, fearsome ape-like creature who sends even the lions fleeing.

When the creature turns its attention to Beatrice, Arthur is thrust into a moment of true courage. Armed only with a sticky piece of fudge, he attempts to defend her. The beast hurls him aside, but Arthur doesn't give up. Swathed in drapery, with Akka perched on his shoulders like a primal disguise, Arthur returns to confront the Missing Link. Amazingly, the disguise works. As Akka distracts the beast with gestures toward the fudge, Arthur maneuvers behind and subdues him, tying him to a post while the chimp finishes the job with a chair leg. The last glimpse of the “beast” is his head sticking out from a collapsed pile of furniture, being pelted by Akka in simian triumph.

Arthur, now a hero, revives the fainted Beatrice, who demands a revolver for safety. Fumbling with the unfamiliar weapon, he accidentally fires it—spooking both of them. When he returns, he mistakes a lump under the blankets (actually Akka hiding) for Beatrice and proposes bashfully to it. Beatrice, having hidden behind the portieres, playfully claims the proposal for herself. Just as they move to embrace, Akka yanks the rug from under them, sending the couple tumbling into one another's arms. As the monkey scampers away gleefully, Arthur and Beatrice laugh—engaged at last thanks to a fudge-loving chimp and a beast that nearly got the girl.

== Cast ==
- Syd Chaplin as Arthur Wells
- Ruth Hiatt as Beatrice Braden
- Tom McGuire as Colonel Braden
- Crauford Kent as Lord Melville Dryden
- Nick Cogley as Captain
- Sam Baker as The Missing Link
- Otto Fries
- Kewpie Morgan as Baggage Master

== Reception ==
The film was a major production by Warner Bros., with a budget of $313,000. It earned $608,000, more than any other silent film released by the studio that season.

The New York Times critic Mordaunt Hall praised the film, observing "there are sequences in this comic contraption that are almost ceirtain to appeal to anybody".

== Box office ==
According to Warner Bros records the film earned $425,000 domestically and $163,000 foreign.

== See also ==
- List of early sound feature films (1926–1929)

== Bibliography ==
- Stein, Lisa K. (November 30, 2010). Syd Chaplin: A Biography. McFarland Publishing. p. 279. ISBN 9780786462261.
