= Old Bill (comics) =

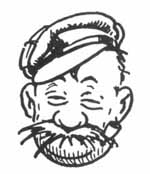
- Old Bill
- First appearance: 1914–1915
- Created by: Bruce Bairnsfather
- Comic strip: Fragments from France

Old Bill is a fictional character created in 1914–15 by cartoonist Bruce Bairnsfather. Old Bill is depicted as an elderly, pipe-smoking British "tommy" with a walrus moustache. The character achieved a great deal of popularity during World War I where he was considered a major morale booster for the British troops. Old Bill and his younger troopmate little Alphie are private infantrymen in the British Expeditionary Force.

Many claims have been put forth as being the model for "Old Bill", but the most likely appears to be Thomas Henry Rafferty, a lance corporal from Birmingham in Bairnsfather's regiment, the Royal Warwickshires, who was killed in the same action that invalided Bairnsfather in April 1915. Rafferty was featured in the Weekly Dispatch in 1917, referred to as "Old Bill", along with a photograph taken by Bairnsfather.

== Adaptations ==
In 1917, a successful musical based on the character, The Better 'Ole, opened in London at the Oxford Music Hall, where it ran for over 800 performances, starring Arthur Bourchier as Old Bill. It later also ran successfully on Broadway, where Charles Coburn starred as Old Bill. The success of the piece led to a West End sequel, Old Bill, M.P., which opened at the Lyceum Theatre, London on 12 July 1922. Old Bill was played by Edmund Gwenn, and Bairnsfather appeared as himself. Unlike The Better 'Ole, the later piece was not a musical. It ran until 11 November 1922. The character was played by Johnny Danvers in the 1925 musical comedy Carry On Sergeant! at the New Oxford Theatre but the piece failed, running for only 35 performances.

Two film adaptations of The Better 'Ole were made during the silent era. The first, a 1919 British version, stars Charles Rock as Bill. The second version is a 1926 Warner Bros. production. This film, the second feature to use the Vitaphone sound process, stars Syd Chaplin as Old Bill.

In 1941, a British film Old Bill and Son, updated the story to World War II with Old Bill serving with British troops in France along with his son during the phony war period.

== Cultural impact ==
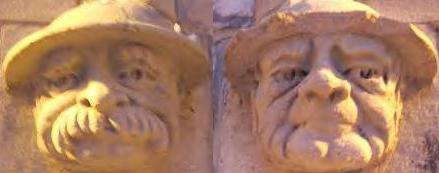
Old Bill & Alphie at Yeo Hall, Royal Military College of Canada

Bill & Alphie's, the Royal Military College of Canada on-campus cadet pub in Kingston, Ontario is named after Bruce Bairnsfather's Great War cartoon characters. Yeo Hall at the Royal Military College of Canada features sculptures of Bill and Alphie.

One of the explanations of the origin of the London slang term "Old Bill", meaning the police, is that constables often used to sport "Old Bill" moustaches.

A 1911 B-type London bus, one of 900 which served as troop transports in World War I, was restored and named "Old Bill" in 1926. It is now preserved in the Imperial War Museum.

A North British Railways locomotive, of NBR Class C, number 661, was named Ole Bill in 1919 in recognition of service overseas in The Great War. This locomotive was later renumbered 9661 after the London North Eastern Railway was formed at railway grouping in 1923.
