= Bruce Bairnsfather =

British artist (1887–1959)

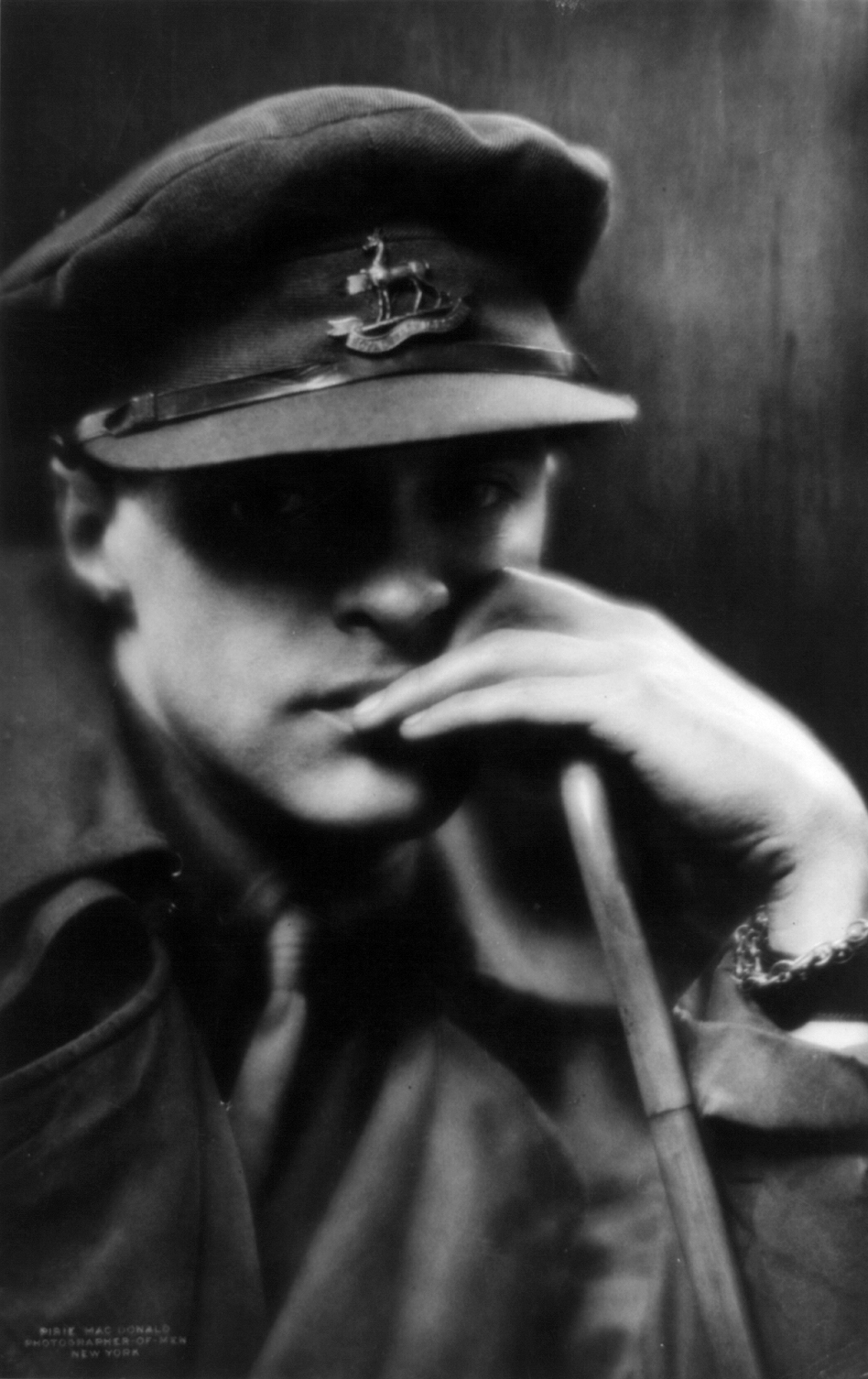
- Photo of the author, 1918, by Pirie MacDonald
- Born: 9 July 1887; Murree, British India
- Died: 29 September 1959 (aged 72)
- Education: United Services College
- Known for: Humorist and cartoonist
- Notable work: Old Bill
- Military career
- Allegiance: United Kingdom
- Branch: British Army
- Service years: 1907–
- Rank: Captain
- Units: Cheshire Regiment; Royal Warwickshire Regiment
- Conflicts: First World War: Second Battle of Ypres
- Awards: Mentioned in despatches (1918)

Captain Charles Bruce Bairnsfather (9 July 1887 – 29 September 1959) was a prominent British humorist and cartoonist. His best-known cartoon character is Old Bill. Bill and his pals Bert and Alf featured in Bairnsfather's "Fragments from France" cartoons published weekly in The Bystander magazine during the First World War.

== Early life ==
Bairnsfather was born at Murree, British India (now Pakistan) to Major Thomas Henry Bairnsfather (1859–1944), of the Indian Staff Corps, and (Amelia) Jane Eliza, daughter of Edward Every-Clayton and granddaughter of Sir Henry Every, 9th Baronet. His parents were second cousins, both being great-grandchildren of Sir Edward Every, 8th Baronet.

Bairnsfather spent his early life in India, but was brought to England in 1895 to be educated at the United Services College, Westward Ho!, then at Stratford-upon-Avon. Initially intending a military career, he failed the entrance exams to the Royal Military College, Sandhurst, and the Royal Military Academy, Woolwich. Finally, he was able to pass the much simpler exam for a part-time Militia commission. He was commissioned as a second lieutenant in the 5th Battalion (Warwickshire Militia), Royal Warwickshire Regiment, on 1 March 1907.

He resigned in 1907 to become an artist, studying at the John Hassall School of Art. Unsuccessful at first, he worked as an electrical engineer. Working in this capacity for the Old Memorial Theatre, Stratford, brought him into acquaintance with Marie Corelli, who introduced him to Thomas Lipton, a connection that led to commissions to draw advertising sketches for Lipton tea, Player's cigarettes, Keen's Mustard, and Beecham's Pills.

== First World War service ==
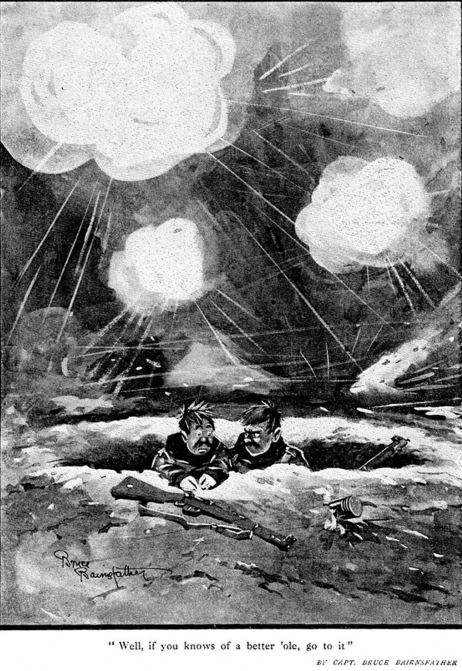
"Well, if you knows of a better 'ole, go to it", Bairnsfather's best-known cartoon, 1915

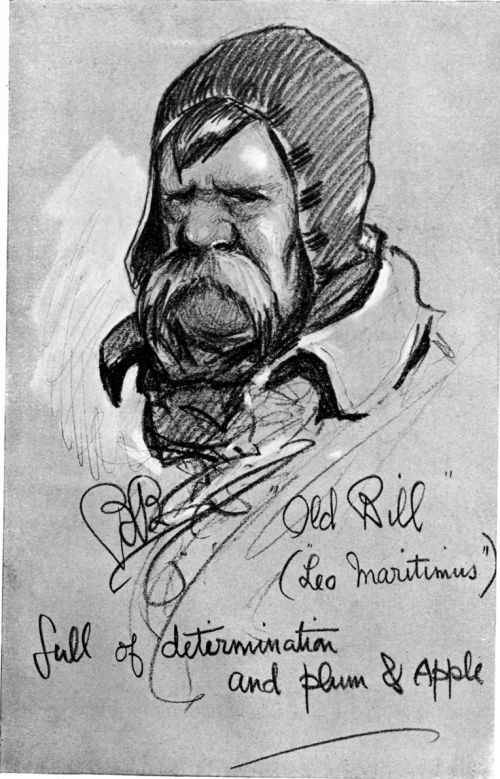
"Old Bill", from Bullets & Billets: "First Discovered in the Alluvial Deposits of Southern Flanders. Feeds Almost Exclusively on Jam and Water Biscuits. Hobby: Filling Sandbags, on Dark and Rainy Nights".

On 11 September 1914, Bairnsfather joined the 3rd Battalion, Royal Warwickshire Regiment as a second lieutenant. He was promoted to lieutenant on 19 December 1914, and to captain on 2 February 1915.

He served in France until 1915, and was seconded as Brigade Machine Gun Officer on 3 October 1915. He was hospitalised with shell shock and hearing damage sustained during the Second Battle of Ypres. On 25 April 1916, he was made a staff captain while attached to headquarters. Posted to the 34th Division HQ on Salisbury Plain, he developed his humorous series for the Bystander about life in the trenches, featuring "Old Bill", a curmudgeonly soldier with trademark walrus moustache and balaclava. The best remembered of these shows Bill with another trooper in a muddy shell hole with shells whizzing all around. The other trooper is grumbling and Bill advises:

Well, If you knows of a better 'ole, go to it.

Many of his cartoons from this period were collected in Fragments from France (1914) and the autobiographical Bullets & Billets (1916).

Despite Bairnsfather's immense popularity with the troops and a massive sales increase for the Bystander, initially there were objections to the "vulgar caricature". Nevertheless, success in raising morale led to Bairnsfather's promotion and receipt of a War Office appointment to draw similar cartoons for other Allied forces.

In May 1918, he was mentioned in despatches by General Herbert Plumer.

== Post-war ==
In 1921, Bairnsfather married Cecilia Agnes Scott (née Bruton). She was the divorced wife of eminent golfer Michael Scott.

"Old Bill" and Bairnsfather himself continued in popularity between the wars. Many police officers of the time had similar facial hair, and that may have led to British police being referred to as The Old Bill. The Bill was a British t.v. series which shortened the original commonly used phrase. Bairnsfather was the subject of one of the first British sound films in 1927, wrote and directed the 1928 Canadian film Carry On Sergeant, and took part in the early Alexandra Palace television transmissions in 1936. Old Bill appeared in numerous books, plays, musicals and films. Bairnsfather's autobiography, Wide Canvas, appeared in 1939.

When the Second World War broke out, Bairnsfather continued Old Bill work, but was not asked to help with the British war effort. Instead, he became official cartoonist to the American forces in Europe, contributing to Stars and Stripes and Yank, whilst residing at Cresswell House in Clun, Shropshire.

He also drew cartoons at American bases and nose art on aircraft. His works are considered to have influenced artists such as Bill Mauldin.

One famous cartoon that Bairnsfather drew shows Old Bill sitting in a trench with a big shell hole next to him from a near miss. Old Bill says to the men around him "Mice!" What the Germans thought of this cartoon was revealed in a British newspaper clipping from World War II. Quoting a Nazi textbook taken from a German prisoner of war that shows the cartoon, the clipping reads: "Obviously, the hole was not made by a mouse. It was made by a shell. There is no humor in this misstatement of facts. The man, Old Bill, was clearly mistaken in thinking a mouse had made it. People who can laugh at such mistakes are obviously not normal; therefore we should pay careful attention to their psychology. Their very decadence may prove to be a weapon of self-defense."

During later life, Bairnsfather had found himself typecast as the creator of Old Bill. His Times obituary, discussing his career, came to the conclusion that he was "fortunate in possessing a talent ... which suited almost to the point of genius one particular moment and one particular set of circumstances; and he was unfortunate in that he was never able to adapt, at all happily, his talent to new times and new circumstances". He died in 1959 aged 72 of complications from bladder cancer, in Worcester.

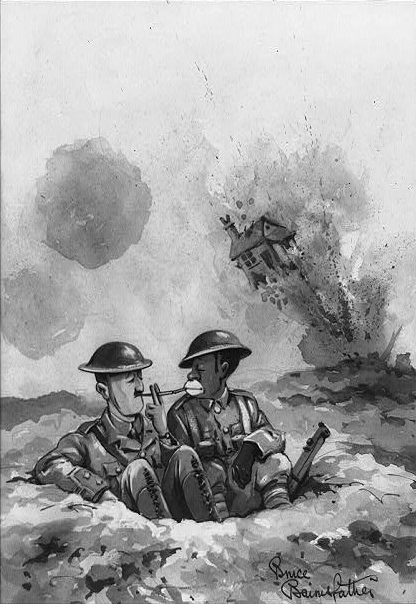
"The Growth of Democracy" by Bruce Bairnsfather (1917). "Colonel Sir Valtravers Plantagenet gladly accepts a light, during a slight lull in a barrage, from a private in the Benin Rifles".

== Legacy ==
A commemorative blue plaque appears outside one of his old studios, 1 Sterling Street, Knightsbridge London (51.4995°N 0.16686°W). The blue plaque was initiated by Tonie and Valmai Holt who later wrote Bairnsfather's biography (In Search of the Better Ole – the Life, the Works and the Collectables of Bruce Bairnsfather) and also sponsored a memorial plaque to Bairnsfather on the cottage at St Yvon in Belgium at the edge of Plugstreet Wood where Bairnsfather drew his first 'trench' cartoons.

A plaque commemorating Bruce Bairnsfather was unveiled at his former home, Victoria Spa Lodge, Bishopton, Stratford upon Avon (52.205018°N 1.731122°W) on 10 September 2005 by cartoonist Bill Tidy. The plaque was instigated by Mark Warby, Editor of The Old Bill Newsletter, the official journal for Bairnsfather enthusiasts and collectors.

On 24 September 2011, a plaque commemorating Bruce Bairnsfather was unveiled on the wall of Colwall Royal British Legion Club in Crescent Road, Colwall, near Malvern in Worcestershire. The plaque was instigated by the Colwall Village Society and was unveiled by Mark Warby. Bairnsfather lived in Colwall from 1951 to 1954 and was well known at the British Legion Club in the village.

Bill & Alphie's, the Royal Military College of Canada's on-campus cadet pub in Kingston, Ontario is named after Bruce Bairnsfather's Great War cartoon characters. Yeo Hall at the College of Canada features sculptures of Bill and Alphie.

There is a large mural featuring "Old Bill" smoking amidst the ruins of a French village, drawn on the wall of the main staircase in the Royal British Legion Victory House Club in Ludlow, Shropshire.

== Filmography ==
- The Better 'Ole Welsh-Pearson Films (1918)
- Old Bill Through the Ages Ideal Films (1924) – personal appearance
- The Better 'Ole Warner Bros (1926)
- Old Bill's Christmas RKO (1930)
- Old Bill & Son Legeran Films (1941)
