= Rolfe Kent =

English composer

- Born: St Albans, Hertfordshire, England
- Genre: Film score
- Years active: 1989–present

Rolfe R. Kent is an English film score composer.

== Biography ==
Kent was born in St Albans, Hertfordshire, England. He attended St Albans School, worked at Balrossie School in Renfrewshire, Scotland, then graduated in psychology (BSc) from the University of Leeds in 1986. 1986-1988 he taught psychology at Leeds Polytechnic (now Leeds Beckett University) before moving to London to concentrate on film scoring.

Kent resides in Los Angeles. He was nominated for a Golden Globe Award in the "Best Original Score" category for Sideways. He also composed the music for the movies Slums of Beverly Hills, The Men Who Stare at Goats, Killers, Wedding Crashers, Legally Blonde, About Schmidt, Freaky Friday, Mean Girls, Election, Town & Country, Kate & Leopold, The Matador, 17 Again, Reign Over Me, Thank You for Smoking, The Hunting Party, The Lucky Ones, Gun Shy, Happy Campers, Ghosts of Girlfriends Past, Just Like Heaven, Gambit, Dom Hemingway, Magic Camp, Up in the Air and Rock Dog. In addition, he composed the theme song to the Showtime Original Series Dexter, for which he was nominated for the Primetime Emmy Award for Outstanding Main Title Theme Music. In 2013, he scored Jason Reitman's Labor Day, Nicolas Bary's Au bonheur des ogres, and Jason Bateman's directorial debut Bad Words. He scored the 2017 film Downsizing by Alexander Payne.

In 2015, the Dallas Chamber Symphony commissioned Kent to write an original film score for Bumping into Broadway starring Harold Lloyd. The score premiered live to film in concert on 18 February 2015 at Moody Performance Hall with Richard McKay conducting.
