= Kazuhiro Takagi =

Japanese violinist

- Takagi in 2019

Background information
- Origin: Japan
- Genre: Classical
- Occupation: Violinist
- Instrument: Violin
- Labels: Naxos, Albany
- Member of: Dallas Chamber Symphony

Kazuhiro Takagi is a Japanese violinist who is currently concertmaster of the Dallas Chamber Symphony.

== Education ==
He studied at the Deuxieme Academie de Musique Francaise de Kyoto, Chicago College of Fine Arts, the Conservatoire National Superieur Musique de Lyon (1994) and Southern Methodist University (1995). His mentors include Pierre Dukan, Pierre Takayoshi Wanami, Yuko Mori, Eduard Wulfson and Eduard Schmieder.

== Career ==
Takagi has performed as a soloist with leading orchestras, including the Tokyo Symphony Orchestra, Vietnam National Symphony Orchestra, Wuerttembergische Philharmonie Reutlingen in Germany, Osaka Philharmonic Orchestra, Osaka Symphony Orchestra, Kansai Philharmonic Orchestra, and Japan Century Symphony Orchestra.

He is a prize-winner of the Queen Elisabeth Music Competition in Brussels, the Geneva International Music Competition, and the Fischoff National Music Competition.

Takagi was also the concertmaster of the Civic Orchestra of Chicago under Daniel Barenboim, Tokyo Symphony Orchestra, and Yamagata Symphony Orchestra.

His recordings of Hiroshi Ohguri are widely distributed on the Naxos label.

== Recordings ==
- Ohguri: Violin Concerto; Fantasy on Osaka Folk Tunes, Kazuhiro Takagi / Tatsuya Shimono / Osaka Philharmonic Orchestra, Naxos, 2003
- Paganini: 24 Caprices, Kazuhiro Takagi, Live Notes WWCC, 2016
- Chasing Home: Music by Aaron Copland, Joseph Thalken, Dallas Chamber Symphony, Richard McKay, conductor. Albany. 2024.
