= Corgan =

Corgan may refer to:

== People with the surname ==
- Billy Corgan (born 1967), American musician, singer-songwriter, and wrestling promoter
- Jack Corgan (died 2000), American architect
- Mike Corgan (1918–1989), American football player
- Richard Corgan (born 1978), Welsh actor

== Other uses ==
- Corgan (company), an American architecture firm
