= Joseph Thalken =

American composer and pianist

Joseph Thalken is an American composer and pianist.

== Biography ==
Joseph Thalken was raised in Southern California and was mentored early on by Lynn Murray, Margaret and Karl Kohn. He was supported by the Young Musicians Foundation and went on to study piano with Robert Weirich at Northwestern University.

He has composed music for theater, including Was, Harold & Maude, Fall of ‘94, Borrowed Dust and Inventions for Piano. He has also composed music for ballet, choir, chamber ensemble, orchestra and wind ensemble.

He has served as a music director or arranger for notable Broadway performers, including Julie Andrews, Liza Minnelli, Patti LuPone, Bernadette Peters, Renée Fleming, Rebecca Luker, Marin Mazzie, Liz Callaway, Sierra Boggess, Catherine Malfitano, Elizabeth Futral, Kristin Chenoweth, Polly Bergen, Michael Crawford, Howard McGillin, Brian Stokes Mitchell, Nathan Gunn and Rodney Gilfry, among others.

In 2017, Thalken was commissioned by Bruce Wood Dance to write Chasing Home, which was premiered at Moody Performance Hall, recorded by the Dallas Chamber Symphony, and released on Albany Records.

== Recordings ==
- Broadway, Renée Fleming, BBC Concert Orchestra, Rob Fisher, conductor. Decca. 2018.
- Chasing Home, Dallas Chamber Symphony, Richard McKay, conductor. Albany. 2024.
