= Dallas International Piano Competition =

Piano competition in Dallas, Texas, USA

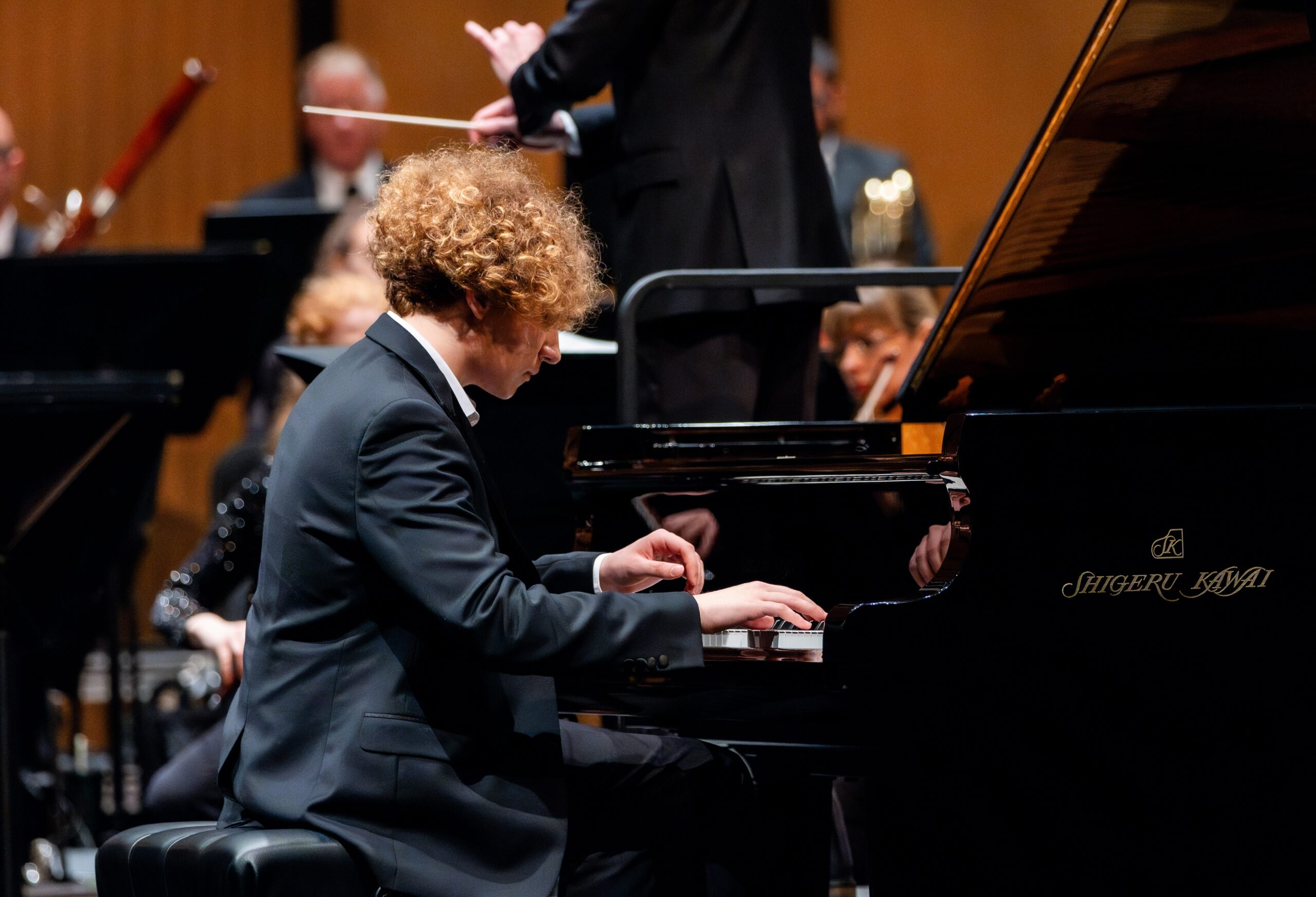
- Adam Jackson, winner 2024
- Nickname: DIPC
- Genre: Classical
- Frequency: Biennial
- Venue: Moody Performance Hall
- Locations: Dallas, Texas
- Country: United States
- Founder: Richard McKay
- Organiser: Dallas Chamber Symphony
- Website: dallasipc.org

The Dallas International Piano Competition is a piano competition hosted biennially in Dallas, Texas by the Dallas Chamber Symphony.

== History ==
The Dallas International Piano Competition was established in 2012 by Richard McKay and the Dallas Chamber Symphony. Early iterations of the competition were held at Southern Methodist University. Since 2022, the event has been held biennially and hosted in the Dallas Arts District. Pianists 18-35 years of age are eligible to participate.

The event typically spans three rounds, which are held over the course of several days, with earlier rounds focused on concerto and solo repertoire. Since 2022, finalists have performed piano concertos with the Dallas Chamber Symphony at Moody Performance Hall.

A jury of notable concert pianists and pedagogues decide how to award the competition’s main prize, consisting of a cash award and engagement to perform an additional concert with the Dallas Chamber Symphony. The competition also awards an audience choice award, which is tabulated by vote of audience members in attendance at the competition’s finals concert.

== Past winners ==
The following is a list of previous first-prize winners of the Dallas International Piano Competition:

- 2013: Congcong Chai, China
- 2014: Kyle Orth, United States
- 2015: Saetbyeol Serena Kim, South Korea
- 2016: Kenneth Broberg, United States
- 2017: Yibing Zhang, China
- 2018: Hsin-Hao Yang, Taiwan
- 2022: Jonathan Mamora, United States
- 2024: Adam Jackson, United States

== See also ==
- Dallas International Violin Competition
