= Lindsay Pearce =

American actress and singer (born 1991)

Lindsay Heather Pearce
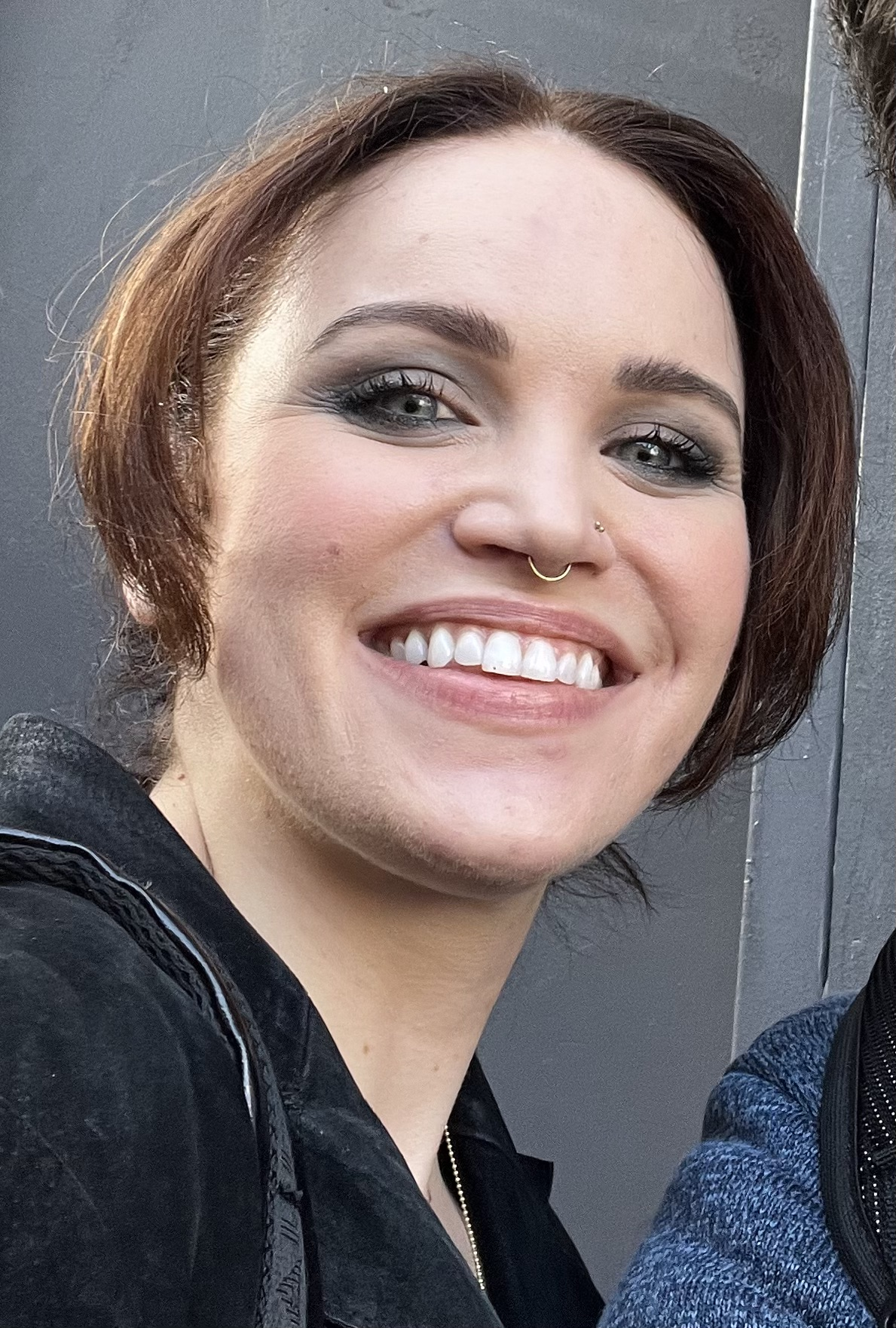
- Pearce in 2023

Background information
- Born: Lindsay Heather Pearce; April 30, 1991 (age 35); Modesto, California, U.S.
- Genres: Pop; show tunes; orchestral; operatic pop; soul
- Occupations: Actress; singer
- Years active: 2008–present

Lindsay Heather Pearce (born April 30, 1991) is an American actress and singer best known for her work in musical theatre. She made her Broadway debut as Elphaba in Wicked in February 2020 and later made her national tour debut as Janis Sarkisian in Mean Girls in May 2022 and then Fantine in Les Misérables. Other regional theatre credits include Wendla in Spring Awakening, Ivy in Bare: A Pop Opera, and Whatsername in American Idiot.

She is also known for being one of the runners-up on The Glee Project, which gave her a guest starring role on the third season of the TV show Glee in 2011.

== Early life ==
Pearce was born April 30, 1991, in Modesto, California, and was adopted by Carol and Gregory Pearce. She was adopted into a very athletic family; all three of her brothers played sports and one, Heath Pearce, went on to be a professional soccer player.

At a young age, Pearce moved with her family to Portland, Oregon, so her father could attend Multnomah University. While at a soccer tournament there, Pearce was discovered singing by a music teacher who taught at a local university, who then recommended to her parents that they do something about her talent. Upon moving back to Modesto, Pearce got involved in the children's community theatre division of Townsend Opera Players and continued doing community theatre. She became a regular in shows with Opera Modesto, Denair Gaslight Theater, Sonora's Stage 3 Theatre, and Turlock Youth Performing Arts. Her first regional credit was at 17 playing Belle in Tri-Valley Repertory Theatre's production of Beauty and the Beast in the summer of 2008. She was also in productions of Peter Pan and Cinderella with Tri-Valley Repertory Theatre in 2009 and 2010, respectively.

Pearce attended Modesto Christian High School until her sophomore year, when she decided to leave and apply to other programs because it did not have an arts program. She then attended Valley Charter High School to complete her high school education while simultaneously taking full time college classes at Modesto Junior College, where she studied classical voice, Shakespeare, movement for the stage and English literature and was also able to participate in college theatre.

Pearce intended to attend a four-year university for musical theatre and applied to several, including Elon University, when she was 19 but was not accepted. Her plan was to do another semester at Modesto Junior College and then reapply. In 2010, she participated in the inaugural Valley's Got Talent (now called Valley Talent Project), a talent competition in Modesto, California, which she won after singing Gimme Gimme from Thoroughly Modern Millie. Robert Ulrich, the casting director for both Glee and The Glee Project, was a judge for the competition and later encouraged her to audition for The Glee Project.

== Career ==
=== 2011: Beginnings on The Glee Project ===
==== The Glee Project ====
In early 2011, Pearce auditioned for The Glee Project, a singing/acting reality show where the winner would receive a seven-episode arc on the third season of Glee. She reached the show's finale, but did not win the competition; however, the producers gave her and the other runner-up, Alex Newell, each a two-episode arc on Glee.

Pearce later explained that being on The Glee Project felt like abuse and the show was heavily edited to make her seem like a monster. Scenes that could've "humanized" her were frequently cut, including a moment when she talked about her sexual assault. Additionally, a director on the show told her to kiss fellow contestant Cameron Mitchell while shooting a music video, and she did not know he had not given consent. This kiss eventually led to Mitchell quitting the show two weeks later.

==== Glee ====
In the third-season premiere of Glee, Pearce was introduced as Harmony, an ambitious and talented singer who awes characters Kurt and Rachel when they watch her and her group sing a mash-up of "Anything Goes" from the musical Anything Goes and "Anything You Can Do" from the musical Annie Get Your Gun. This first episode featuring her character aired September 20, 2011. Her debut was widely acclaimed by critics such as TVLine's Michael Slezak, who said Harmony was "brilliantly brought to life" by Pearce, and Emily VanDerWerff of The A.V. Club, who wrote that she "may be the best new character ever". The mash-up was released as a single for digital download after the episode aired. She appeared for a second time in the eighth episode, "Hold On to Sixteen", in which Harmony was the lead singer of a different group, the Unitards, a rival show choir competing against the show's main glee club, New Directions. In the episode, she sings "Buenos Aires" from the musical Evita, which was also released as a single. Pearce was complimented for her rendition by Billboard's Rae Votta, who said she was a "fantastic singer". Harmony tells Kurt that she is a sophomore, leaving open the possibility that she could return to the show in future seasons.

The "Anything Goes" / "Anything You Can Do" mash-up was widely acclaimed. Respers France named Pearce's performance the best moment of the episode, and found that the character positively reminded her of "Glee of old". The song was also a favorite of Lee's, who wrote that the intensity of the actress was perfectly matched to the character's disposition. West, Slezak and Benigno gave the performance an "A"; the former called it an "outstanding rendition" which "felt like it belonged on a big stage or in a big-screen musical", and the latter two praised her vocal talent, which Benigno deemed unequalled on Glee. Futterman and Bell found Harmony a credible rival to Rachel vocally, and eagerly anticipated future competition between them. Urban called Pearce's performance merely "serviceable". Though she felt her acting was a weak point, she compared her favorably to season two guest star Jake Zyrus and praised her vocals.

=== 2011–2015: Regional theatre ===
==== A Snow White Christmas ====
The day after The Glee Project finale aired, The Hollywood Reporter reported that Pearce had been cast to star as Snow White in El Portal Theatre's production of the musical A Snow White Christmas. Marina Sirtis co-starred as the Wicked Queen, and Neil Patrick Harris in the onscreen role of the Magic Mirror. The Lythgoe Family Productions show ran from November 30, 2011, through December 18, 2011. Bobbie Whiteman of Variety wrote that Pearce as "a very sassy Snow [that] belts out Lady Gaga's 'Born This Way' in true Broadway fashion", and that "her voice blends beautifully with Bergen's", the show's prince. TheaterMania's Jonas Schwartz called the production "rather endearing, thanks mostly to The Glee Project's Lindsay Pearce in the title role". He added, "Pearce has a wonderful presence, an earthy charm, and her belting voice is used to fine effect on Lady Gaga's 'Born This Way' and Katy Perry's 'Fireworks'."

==== The Last Five Years ====
She next starred in the role of Cathy in Jason Robert Brown's musical The Last Five Years at the Brauntex Theatre in New Braunfels, Texas. There were three performances, on January 6 and 7, 2012. Deborah Martin of the San Antonio Express-News wrote of Pearce and co-star Alex Trevino that they "give charismatic, vocally assured performances, fully capturing the relationship and their characters' inner lives. Highlights include Pearce's pain-drenched 'Still Hurting', tender 'I'm Part of That' and witty 'Audition Sequence'". She also noted that "when they actively share the stage, Pearce and Trevino show off great chemistry".

==== Spring Awakening ====
Ten days later, Pearce had been cast as Wendla Bergman, the female lead in the musical Spring Awakening, which was presented in Los Angeles by Over the Moon Productions. The show opened on March 16, 2012, and ended its run on April 22, 2012.

==== For the Record ====
Between 2013 and 2017, Pearce appeared in various roles in the For the Record series in Los Angeles and on the Norwegian Cruise Lines alongside cast such as Janel Parrish, Rumer Willis, Barrett Foa, Shoshana Bean, and Ginifer King. The For the Record series was created by Shane Scheel and Christopher Lloyd Bratten and reinvents cabaret with productions that blend movies and music. Her roles in the series include Daisy Buchanan in For the Record: Baz Luhrmann in 2013 and 2014, O-Ren Ishii in For the Record: Tarantino in 2014, and Basketcase in For the Record: The Brat Pack in 2017.

==== Bare ====
It was announced in May 2013 that glory|struck productions would present the Los Angeles return of the Damon Intrabartolo-Jon Hartmere pop opera Bare at the Hayworth Theatre in Downtown Los Angeles from September 5 to 22, 2013. Later in June, it was announced Pearce was set to play Ivy in the production alongside Payson Lewis and Jonah Platt. Pearce subsequently won 2013 BroadwayWorld Los Angeles's Best Leading Actress in a Musical (Local Production) award for her performance as Ivy.

==== American Idiot ====
On April 9, 2015, it was announced that Pearce would be playing a role in the immersive glory|struck production of American Idiot. It was later announced that she would play Whatshername. Performances began on May 15 and the show closed on June 7.

=== 2020–Present: Broadway debut and mainstream success ===
On February 25, 2020, Pearce made her Broadway debut as Elphaba in Wicked. After her first week in the role, she sustained a hip injury that sidelined her for five shows. Shortly after returning from the injury, Broadway went dark. On September 14, 2021, she reopened Wicked on Broadway as Elphaba after the COVID-19 pandemic shutdown. Upon returning, she sustained another injury and was out of the show on medical leave from October 12 to December 11. After playing her final show on May 22, 2022, Pearce joined the first national tour of the musical Mean Girls as Janis Sarkisian. Afterwards Pearce starred as Fantine in the national tour of Les Misérables.

== Personal life ==
Pearce moved to Los Angeles, California, following The Glee Project in 2011 and resided there until she moved to New York in 2020 for her job in Wicked.

Pearce has been open about her alcoholism and sobriety. Her drinking and drug use escalated in the spring of 2013 and she made the decision to get clean and sober in February 2018.

== Filmography ==
Year	Title	Role	Notes
2011	The Glee Project	Herself	Contestant; runner-up
2011	Glee	Harmony	2 episodes
2013	Drop Dead Diva	Ashley	Episode: "One Shot"
2013	Through the Woods	Jeanne Lewis	Short film
2013	Mantervention	Monica	
2013	Face	Amy	Short film
2014	Grey's Anatomy	Holly Tichener	Episode: "Risk"
2015	The Wedding Ringer	Alexandra Plylow	
2016	Recovery Road	Rebecca Granger	8 episodes

== Stage credits ==
Year	Title	Role	Production	Location	Dates
2008	Beauty and the Beast	Belle	Tri-Valley Repertory Theatre	Bankhead Theatre in Livermore, CA	July 18 - August 10, 2008
2009	Peter Pan	Wendy Darling	Tri-Valley Repertory Theatre	Bankhead Theatre in Livermore, CA	July 17 - August 2, 2009
2010	Cinderella	Cinderella	Tri-Valley Repertory Theatre	Bankhead Theatre in Livermore, CA	January 22 - February 7, 2010
2010	Macbeth	Lady Macbeth	Modesto Junior College Productions	Performing and Media Arts Center in Modesto, CA	October 22–31, 2010
2010	Cinderella	Cinderella	Playhouse Merced	Merced, CA	December 2–19, 2010
2011	A Snow White Christmas	Snow White	Lythgoe Family Productions	El Portal Theatre	November 30 - December 18, 2011
2012	The Last Five Years	Cathy	UnderMotion Productions	Brauntex Theatre	January 6–8, 2012
2012	Spring Awakening	Wendla Bergmann	Over The Moon Productions	Theatre of Arts Arena Stage	March 14 - April 22, 2012
2013	Bare: A Pop Opera	Ivy	glory|struck Productions	Hayworth Theatre	September 5–22, 2013
2013	For The Record: Baz Luhrmann	Daisy Buchanan, Fran	For The Record: LIVE	Rockwell Table & Stage	October - December 2013
2014	For The Record: Tarantino	O-Ren Ishii	For The Record: LIVE	DBA in Los Angeles, CA	June 2014
2014	For The Record: BAZ	Daisy, Fran	For The Record: LIVE	DBA in Los Angeles, CA	September 2014
2015	Cruel Intentions: The Musical	Kathryn Merteuil	Sucker Love Productions	Rockwell Table & Stage	April 3 - August 31, 2015
2015	American Idiot	Whatsername	glory|struck Productions	A warehouse in Los Angeles' Arts District	May 15 - June 7, 2015
2015	UMPO: Scream	Sidney Prescott	Unauthorized Musical Parodies	Rockwell Table & Stage	October 8 - November 14, 2018
2016	UMPO: Troop Beverly Hills	Carla Gugino	Unauthorized Musical Parodies	Rockwell Table & Stage	July 2 - September 10, 2016
2016	For the Record: The Brat Pack	The Basket Case	For the Record: LIVE	Norwegian Cruise Lines	November 3, 2016 - March 16, 2017
2017	Romeo & Juliet	Juliet	University of North Carolina at Pembroke	Givens Performing Arts Center	September 14, 2017
2018	Vote, Pray, Love	Supporting		Celebration Theatre in Los Angeles, CA	March 2018
2018	Spring Awakening	Ilse	Cupcake Studios	Cupcake Theater	May 4 - July 8, 2018
2019	Romeo and Juliet	Juliet	Murphy's Creek Productions	Murphy's Creek Theatre in Murphys, CA	September 13 - October 13, 2019
2020–2022	Wicked	Elphaba	Broadway	Gershwin Theatre	February 25, 2020 - May 22, 2022
2022	Mean Girls	Janis Sarkisian	First National Tour	Various	May 30, 2022 – May 7, 2023
2023	Titanique	Rose DeWitt Bukater	Off-Broadway	Daryl Roth Theatre	June 6, 2023 – September 2024
2023	Rent	Maureen Johnson	The Muny	The Muny in St. Louis, MO	August 4–10, 2023
2024–2025	Les Misérables	Fantine	National Tour	Various	October 1, 2024 –
