= One Arts Plaza =

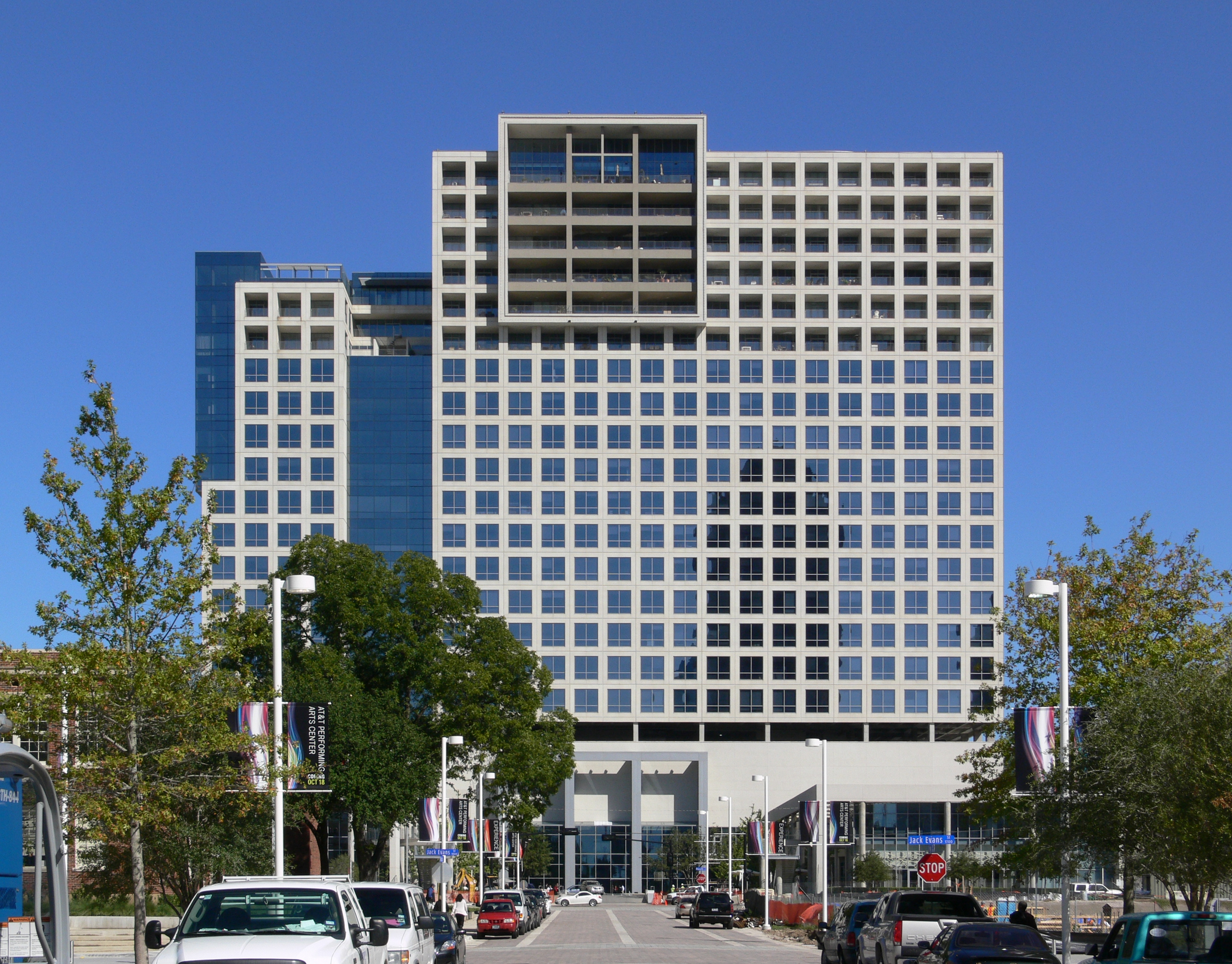
- Interactive map of the One Arts Plaza area

General information
- Status: Completed
- Type: office
- Location: 1722 Routh Street; Dallas, Texas; United States
- Coordinates: 32.791936°N 96.795286°W
- Construction started: 2005
- Completed: 2007
- Owner: Billingsley Company

Height
- Roof: 331 feet (101 m)

Technical details
- Floor count: 24

Design and construction
- Architects: Morrison Seifert Murphy; Corgan Associates, Inc.
- Developer: Billingsley Company
- Structural engineer: Brockette/Davis/Drake, Inc.
- Main contractor: Balfour Beatty

One Arts Plaza is a 24-story skyscraper located at 1722 Routh Street in the Arts District of downtown Dallas, Texas (USA). The mixed-use building stands at a structural height of 331 feet (101 m) and contains 425,000 sq ft (39,000 m^{2}) of class A office space, 30,000 sq ft (3,000 m^{2}) of retail space, and 60 residences. It is easily recognizable by a large LED illuminated square on the east and west sides of the building, which can gradually change colors. This feature was developed by Scott Oldner, a prominent LED lighting designer, and serves as the architectural book-end for the arts district.

The building formerly housed the headquarters of U.S. 7-Eleven operations.

== Current tenants ==
- Billingsley Company
- Knoll
- The Playwright Irish Pub
- Rene Rouleau
- Resource One Credit Union
- 7-Eleven
- TACA
- Tei An
- Holland & Knight LLP
- ThyssenKrupp
- Yolk

== See also ==
- Two Arts Plaza
