= Eduard Schmieder =

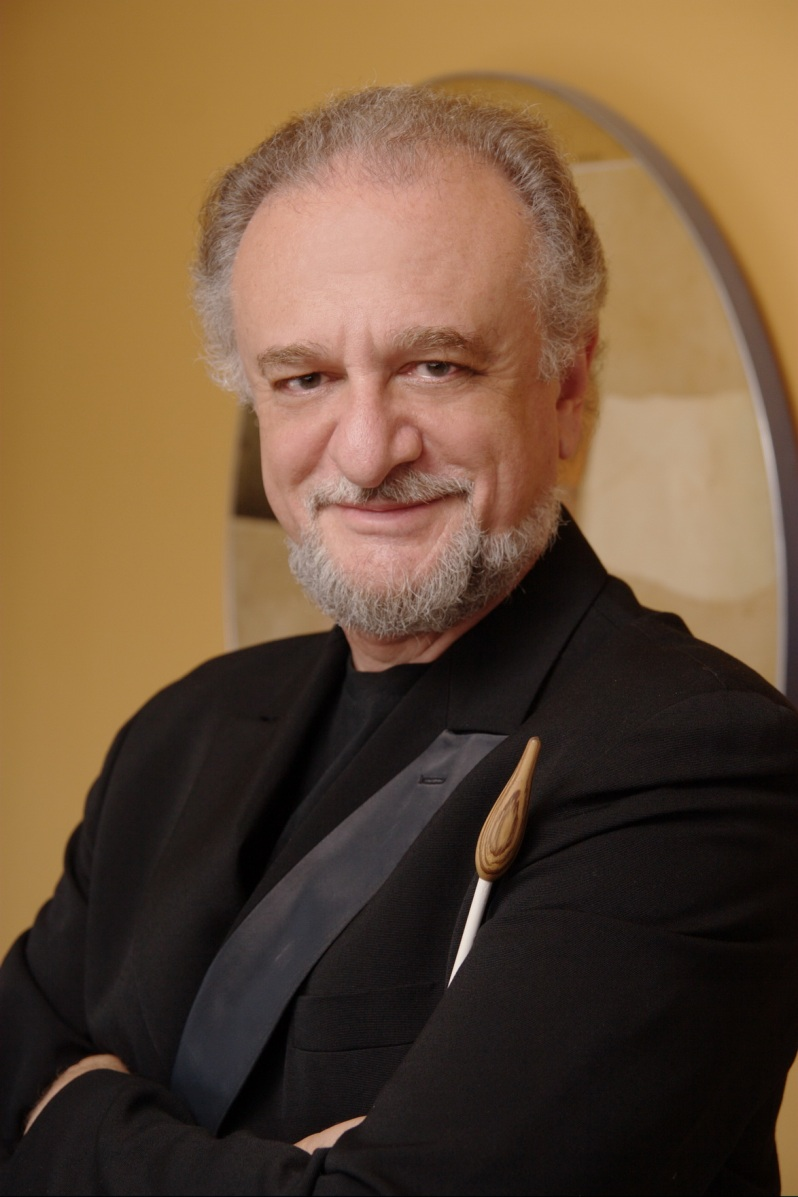
Eduard Schmieder

Eduard Schmieder (born 2 May 1948 in Lvov, Soviet Union) is a violinist, teacher and conductor. He is a highly regarded violin pedagogue.". He currently holds the position of L.H. Carnell Distinguished Professor of Violin at the Boyer College of Music and Dance, Philadelphia, Temple University where he is an Artistic Director for Strings. Prior to that appointment, he was Distinguished Algur H. Meadows Chair of Violin and Chamber Music in the Meadows School of the Arts in Dallas (1990–2006), and tenured professor of the violin at the University of Southern California in Los Angeles (1986-1991), a position formerly held by Jascha Heifetz. His other tenured teaching appointments were at Shepherd School of Music, Rice University, Houston (1982–1986), and Lamar University, Beaumont (1980–1984). Eduard Schmieder immigrated to the United States from USSR in 1979. From 1980 to the present, many featured articles and reviews on his teaching and performances have been written in publications nationwide and internationally.

He has taught master classes in virtually every foremost conservatory in the world, and performs, teaches, and conducts at international music festivals. In the United States he has worked in music festivals at Aspen, Interlochen, Musicorda, Idyllwild, and in New York. From 2004-2017 he was the summer faculty at the prestigious Mozarteum Summer Academie Salzburg, bringing iPalpiti orchestra for concerts in 2005 and 2017 at the Mozarteum concert hall and Solitaire.

Eduard Schmieder founded the iPalpiti Orchestral Ensemble of International Laureates in 1991 in Dallas, and has conducted it in major halls, with residences in the Netherlands and Beverly Hills, California, culminating in sold-out concerts at the famed Concertgebouw (Amsterdam), Disney Hall (Los Angeles), Carnegie Hall (New York), European and Asian tours.

As a violinist and conductor he has collaborated with such musicians as Ida Haendel, Yehudi Menuhin, Brooks Smith, Nathaniel Rosen, Erick Friedman, Tsuyoshi Tsutsumi, and many others. In 1996, Eduard Schmieder performed a recital in Genoa on Paganini's treasured Guarneri del Gesu Il Cannone violin.

== Violin students in performance and competitions ==
Students of Professor Schmieder maintain careers as soloists, chamber musicians and leaders in major orchestras: Tim Fain USA, Kazuhiro Takagi, Catherine Leonard, Pavel Sporcl, Boris Brovtsyn, Dmitri Makhtin, Alexandru Tomescu, Xiao Xiao Cao, Sayako Kusaka, Vadim Tchijik, Catharina Chen and Pieter Schoeman

Professor Schmieder frequently represents the United States as a jury member at leading international violin competitions including:

- Queen Elisabeth International Violin Competition, Belgium (1997,2015)
- Jean Sibelius International Violin Competition, Finland (1990, 2000)
- Georges Enescu International Violin Competitions(2016,2018,2020)
- ARD International Violin Competition, Germany (1992, 2001)
- Leopold Mozart International Violin Competition, Germany (2003, 2006, 2009)
- Premio Paganini, Genoa, Italy (1995, 2000)
- Premio Rodolfo Lipizer Premio Rodolfo Lipizer, Gorizia, Italy (2003)
- International Violin Competition, Sinaia, Romania – President of the Jury (biannual since 2002-2019)
- UNISA (1988,1992)
- Pablo de Sarasate International Violin Competition, Spain (2001, 2008)
- Postacchini International Violin Competition, Fermo, Italy (2007,2014)
- International Spohr-Wettbewerb Competition, Weimar, Germany (2007, 2010)
- 2nd China International Violin Competition, Qingdao (November 2008)
