= Downsizing (soundtrack) =

2017 film soundtrack album

Downsizing (Music from the Motion Picture)

Film score by Rolfe Kent
- Released: December 22, 2017
- Recorded: 2017
- Studio: Streisand Scoring Stage, Sony Pictures Studios, Culver City, California; The Bridge Recording, Glendale, California; Westland Studios, Dublin, Ireland
- Genre: Film score
- Length: 49:44
- Label: WaterTower Music
- Producer: Rolfe Kent

Rolfe Kent chronology
Crash Pad (2017)	Downsizing (2017)	Stan & Ollie (2018)

Downsizing (Music from the Motion Picture) is the film score composed by Rolfe Kent to the 2017 film Downsizing directed by Alexander Payne starring Matt Damon. The score was released through WaterTower Music on December 22, 2017.

== Background ==
Rolfe Kent who previously scored Payne's first three films had been announced as the composer for Downsizing in 2017. The initial brief that Payne provided to Kent was to provide a beautiful classical music for a satirical film representing absurd human emotions. As Kent felt the visuals to be inspired by Stanley Kubrick's works, he wanted to do a Johann Strauss II inspired waltz music or partly grand operatic pieces which did not fit the film after multiple experimentations, hence went ahead with lot of classical music styles. Kent also wrote few Norwegian, Swedish and Glaswegian lyrics to connect with the countries and the characters in the narrative, as well as binding the linguistic nature in the narrative.

A rough cut was provided to Kent when he first signed the project. He was involved in the project for five months discussing the soundscape and ambient nature of the film's music, adding that he had scored the film two-and-a-half times. Kent wrote the score within four weeks and recorded the orchestra within a week's duration.

== Release ==
The soundtrack was released through WaterTower Music on December 22, 2017.

== Reception ==
Jonathan Broxton of Movie Music UK wrote "Kent has successfully navigated this minefield and made Downsizing a little gem: it's pretty, appealing, appropriately poignant and emotional, thematically strong, instrumentally interesting, and even makes room for a song." Todd McCarthy of The Hollywood Reporter wrote "Rolfe Kent's score is discreetly supportive of this moving and beautiful film." Lee Marshall of Screen International called it "a swelling orchestral soundtrack". Nick Johnston of Vanyaland wrote "Rolfe Kent's score is a bit overwhelming at times". Lillian Crawford of Varsity described it as a "breakout score" from Kent. Pete Hammond of Deadline Hollywood called it "whimsical". Robert Kojder of Flickering Myth wrote "the original music from Rolfe Kent maintains the whimsically tuned beats that perfectly set the opening act, which is filled with ideas and imagination."

== Track listing ==
No.	Title	Artist	Length
1.	"A Lab in Norway"		0:46
2.	"The World Is Amazed" (Main Title Theme)		1:47
3.	"Paul's Theme / Visiting Leisureland"		3:02
4.	"The Tiny City Beckons / Estate Aale"		1:31
5.	"Ngọc's Theme"		1:53
6.	"Inching Toward the Downsizing Procedure"		3:45
7.	"The Downsizing Waltz"		5:37
8.	"Five Inches Tall and All Alone"		4:43
9.	"Ngọc Guides Paul Upriver and to the Other Side of the Tracks"		5:09
10.	"“Thank You Special Time”/ Paul Tends to Ngọc's Needs"		4:11
11.	"A Dock in Norway: The Originals"		2:31
12.	"Exodus, Farewells, Lost Luggage and Reunions"		7:18
13.	"The Aeroplane Home / The Rain"		4:01
14.	"A Little Change In the Weather"	The Swingles	3:30
Total length:			49:44

== Personnel ==
Credits adapted from WaterTower Music:

- Music composer and producer – Rolfe Kent
- MIDI programming – Savannah Wheeler
- Recording and mixing – Greg Townley
- Mastering – Gavin Lurssen, Reuben Cohen
- Music editor – Nicholas South
- Assistant music editor – Lena Glikson
- Technician – Jeremy Miller
- Music coordinator – Jason Richmond
- Music production coordinator – Sterling Powers
- Music preparation – Booker White
- Executive producer – Alexander Payne
- Executive in charge of music (Paramount Pictures) – Randy Spendlove
- Executive in charge of music (WaterTower Music) – Jason Linn
- Music business affairs – Raymond Gonzalez

Orchestra and choir

- Orchestra – Hollywood Studio Symphony Orchestra
- Orchestrator – Geoff Stradling
- Conductor – Rolfe Kent
- Concertmaster – Tereza Stanislav
- Orchestra contractor – Peter Rotter
- Choir contractor – Jasper Randall
- Vocals – Nora Way, Stephanie Aston, Suzanne Waters

Instruments

- Bassoon – Damian Montano, Kenneth Munday, Rose Corrigan
- Cello – Armen Ksajikian, Cecilia Tsan, Dennis Karmazyn, Eric Byers, Erika Duke-Kirkpatrick, George Kim Scholes, Jacob Braun, Marshall McDaniel, Paula Hochhalter, Steve Erdody, Timothy Landauer, Vanessa Freebairn-Smith, Helen Altenbach, Stephen Erdody
- Clarinet – Joshua Ranz, Ralph Williams, Stuart Clark
- Contrabass – Christian Kollgaard, Drew Dembowski, Edward Meares, Geoffrey Osika, Neil Garber, Nicholas South, Nico Abondolo, Nicolas Philippon, Stephen Dress, Thomas Harte, Michael Valerio
- Flute – Sara Andon, Geri Rotella, Chris Bleth
- Harp – Marcia Dickstein, JoAnn Turovsky
- Horn – Allen Fogle, Dylan Hart, Katelyn Faraudo, Laura Brenes, Mark Adams, Stephanie Stetson, Steven Becknell, Teag Reaves, Andrew Bain
- Keyboards – Donald Sosin, Robert Thies
- Oboe – Chris Bleth, Lara Wickes
- Percussion – Gregory Goodall, Gregory Ellis, Kenneth McGrath, Wade Culbreath
- Trombone – William Reichenbach, Craig Gosnell, Phillip Keen, Steven Holtman, Alexander Iles
- Trumpet – Barry Perkins, Robert Schaer, Thomas Hooten, Alexander Iles
- Tuba – Doug Tornquist
- Viola – Alma Fernandez, Andrew Duckles, Brian Dembow, Carolyn Riley, Darrin McCann, David Walther, Jeanie Lim, Jerome Gordon, Zach Dellinger, Jonathan Moerschel, Laura Pearson, Luke Maurer, Matthew Funes, Meredith Crawford, Michael Whitson, Shawn Mann, Robert Brophy
- Violin – Alyssa Park, Amy Hershberger, Ana Landauer, Andrew Bulbrook, Benjamin Powell, Benjamin Jacobson, Bruce Dukov, Caroline Campbell, Charlie Bisharat, Darius Campo, Eun-Mee Ahn, Grace Oh, Ina Veli, Irina Voloshina, Jacqueline Brand, Jessica Guideri, Josefina Vergara, Katia Popov, Kevin Connolly, Kevin Kumar, Lisa Liu, Lisa Sutton, Lorand Lokuszta, Lorenz Gamma, Luanne Homzy, Maia Jasper-White, Marc Sazer, Max Karmazyn, Natalie Leggett, Neil Samples, Phillip Levy, Radu Pieptea, Roberto Cani, Roger Wilkie, Serena McKinney, Shawn Hurt, Songa Lee, Stephanie Matthews, Tamara Hatwan, Julie Gigante

== Accolades ==
Award	Date of ceremony	Category	Nominee(s)	Result	Ref.
International Film Music Critics Association	February 22, 2018	Best Original Score For A Comedy Film	Rolfe Kent	Nominated	
