= Dallas International Violin Competition =

Violin Competition in Dallas, Texas, USA

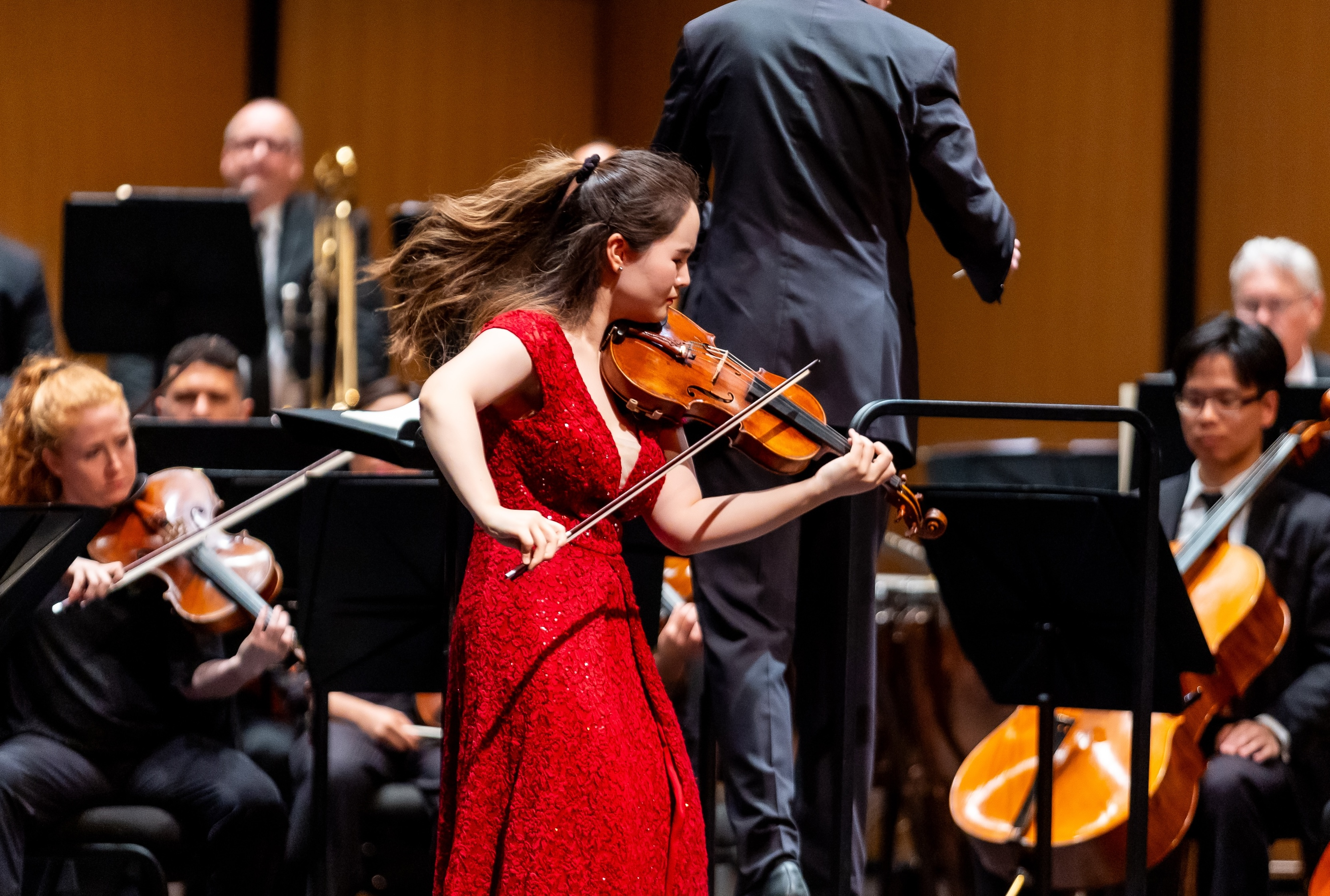
- Jaewon Wee performs the Sibelius Violin Concerto during finals, 2023.
- Locations: Dallas, Texas, USA
- Music Director: Richard McKay

The Dallas International Violin Competition is a classical violin competition which takes place biennially in Dallas, Texas. The competition is hosted by the Dallas Chamber Symphony and was founded in 2022. It is open to violinists between the ages of 17 and 35.

The competition is structured in multiple stages, including preliminary rounds, quarterfinals, semifinals, and a final round where contestants perform a concerto with the Dallas Chamber Symphony. Winners of the competition receive cash awards and a return subscription engagement with the Dallas Chamber Symphony. In addition to the main competition, various masterclasses, workshops, and outreach events are often organized in conjunction with the event, allowing participants to engage with experienced musicians and educators.

Prizewinners of the competition have included Jaewon Wee, Sarah Ying Ma, and Chaewon Kim.

== See also ==
- Dallas International Piano Competition
