= Two Arts Plaza =

- Interactive map of the Two Arts Plaza area

General information
- Status: Completed
- Type: Office
- Location: Arts District; Dallas, Texas; United States
- Coordinates: 32.792773°N 96.796049°W

Technical details
- Floor count: 18
- Floor area: 442,000 sq ft (41,000 m^{2})

Two Arts Plaza will be an 18-story class-A office skyscraper located at Routh Street and Spur 366 (Woodall Rodgers Freeway) in the Arts District of Downtown Dallas, Texas (USA).

== See also ==
- One Arts Plaza
