= Hiroshi Oguri =

Japanese composer

Hiroshi Ohguri
- 大栗裕
- Born: 9 July 1918; Osaka, Japan
- Died: 18 April 1982 (aged 63)
- Occupation: Composer

Hiroshi Oguri, sometimes given as Hiroshi Ohguri, (大栗 裕 Ōguri Hiroshi, July 9, 1918 - April 18, 1982) was a Japanese composer.

== Biography ==
Hiroshi Oguri was born in Osaka, Japan on 9 July 1918. He was from a merchant family in the Senba district of Osaka. His father was an amateur Gidayu player, and he grew up surrounded by traditional Japanese music. He was introduced to European classical music in 1931, upon his entry into high school, where he joined the wind band and learned to play the French horn. After a spell in his family's store, in 1941 he went to Tokyo, where he joined the Tokyo Symphony Orchestra as a hornist. In 1946 he became principal horn of the Japan Symphony Orchestra; in 1949 he resigned and returned to Osaka, where in 1950 he joined the Osaka Philharmonic Orchestra. Here he remained until 1966. Ohguri also taught music in Kyoto Women's University and Osaka College of Music. He died in Osaka on April 18, 1982.

== Works ==
=== Opera ===
- Akai Jinbaori (The Scarlet Cloak), text by Junji Kinoshita (1955)
- Jigokuhen (Hell Screen), text by Ryūnosuke Akutagawa (1968)
- Poseidon Kamensai, text by Kunio Tsuji (1974)

=== Orchestral ===
- Fantasy on Osaka Folk Tunes (1955)
- Violin Concerto (1963)
- Rhapsody on Osaka Nursery Rhymes (1979)

=== Wind Orchestra ===
- Rhapsody (1966)
- Shinwa (A Myth) - after the Tale of Ama-no-Iwayado (1973)
- Burlesque for band (1976)
- Kamen Gensō (Mask Fantasy) (1981)

=== Mandolin Orchestra ===
- Sinfonietta No.1 (1967)
- Sinfonietta No.2 "Romantic" (1974)
- Sinfonietta No.3 "Gholghola's Hill" (1975)
- Sinfonietta No.4 "Labyrinthos" (1975)
- Sinfonietta No.5 (1977)
- Sinfonietta No.6 "Dogū" (1978)
- Sinfonietta No.7 "Contrast" (1981)
- Suite "Kugutsushi (Puppet master)" (1972)
- Symphonic three movements "Fujutsushi (Shaman)" (1976)
- Suite "Onmyōji (Master of onmyōdō)" (1977)
- Kodaibukyoku (Ancient Dances) (1978)
- Meditation (1978)
- Buyōshi (Dance poem) (1979)
- Burlesque for mandolin orchestra (1980)
