= Dallas Chamber Symphony =

Orchestra based in Dallas

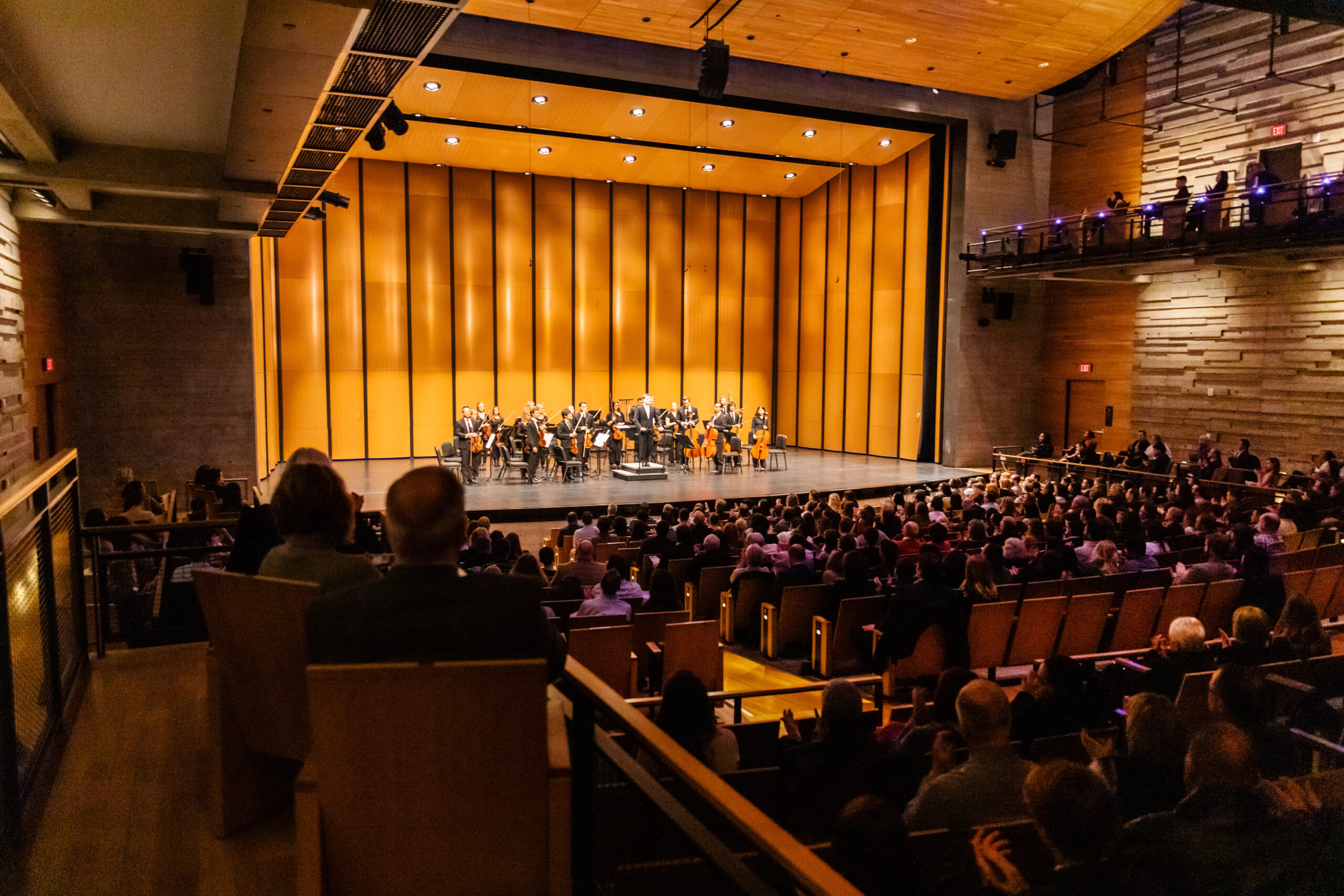
- Dallas Chamber Symphony, 2020
- Short name: DCS
- Founded: 2011
- Location: Dallas, Texas, US
- Concert hall: Moody Performance Hall
- Concertmaster: Kazuhiro Takagi
- Music director: Richard McKay
- Website: dcsymphony.org
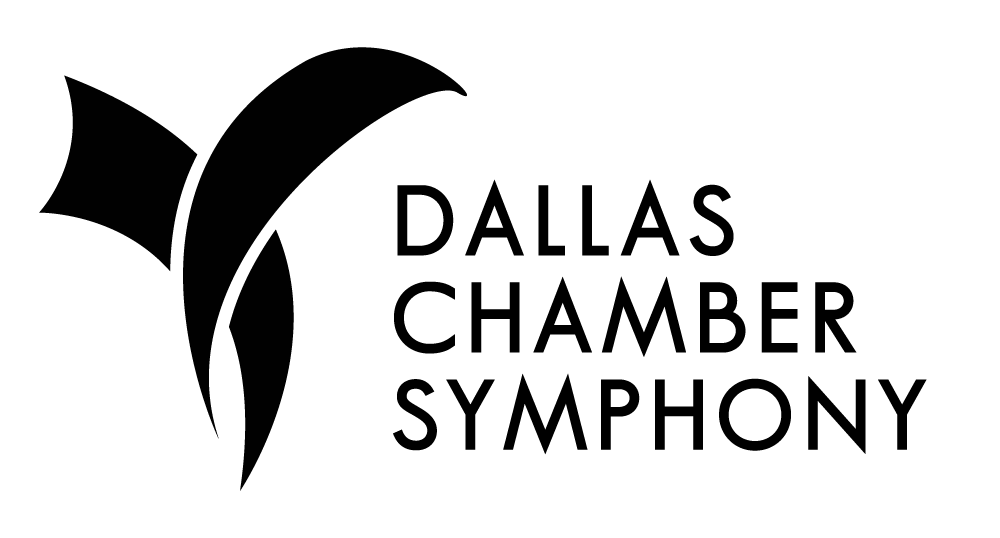

The Dallas Chamber Symphony (DCS) is a professional, American chamber orchestra that performs in the Moody Performance Hall in the Arts District, Dallas. Founded in 2011, and led by artistic director, Richard McKay; the DCS presented its first season in 2012, and performs most of its concerts in the Moody Performance Hall.

Critics have described the DCS as “extremely adroit”, “fresh” and “innovative.” The orchestra has been lauded for its film series, which pairs classic silent films with newly commissioned scores.

Japanese violinist Kazuhiro Takagi is the concertmaster.

== Performance venues ==
The DCS performs its main concert series in Moody Performance Hall, which opened in 2012. Designed by Skidmore, Owings, and Merrill LLP, with Dallas architecture firm Corgan serving as the architect of record, the center is in the heart of the Dallas Arts District.

== International competitions ==
The Dallas International Piano Competition took place for the first time in 2013. In 222, the biennial Dallas International Violin Competition began.

== World premieres ==
In November, 2012, the DCS premiered a new film score to the silent-film comedy A Sailor-Made Man, starring Harold Lloyd. The score was commissioned specifically by the symphony as part of their film series and was composed by Brian Satterwhite.

On February 26, 2013, as part of its film series, the DCS Premiered a new all-strings film score to the silent-film horror classic The Cabinet of Dr. Caligari, starring Conrad Veidt. As with A Sailor-Made Man, the score was commissioned by the symphony and was composed by Brian Satterwhite.

== Educational partners ==
In 2014, the Dallas Chamber Symphony partnered with the Dallas Independent School District (DISD) for an educational concert performed at Moody Performance Hall in conjunction with the release of the orchestra's iPad music curriculum.
