= Jack Corgan =

American architect

Jack Murl Corgan (died 2000) was an American architect known for the theaters he designed in the Southwest and development of hotels in Las Vegas, Nevada with business partner William J. Moore.

== Biography ==
Corgan was born in Hugo, Oklahoma. He graduated from Oklahoma State University (OSU) in 1935. He moved to Dallas, Texas and opened his architectural firm Corgan in 1938, focusing largely on theaters and drive-ins. In 1941, he designed the first drive-in theatre. In the mid-1950s, Corgan designed the Dallas Love Field airport terminal. In 1960, Corgan was the president of the Texas Society of Architects.

Corgan is the father of architect Clifford Jack Corgan (born 1945), also known as Jack Corgan, who took over leadership of the architectural firm in the 1970s. (Note: C. Jack Corgan also studied at OSU before transferring to Massachusetts Institute of Technology. In 2015, C. Jack Corgan was inducted into the Oklahoma State University College of Engineering, Architecture, and Technology Hall of Fame.)

== Works ==
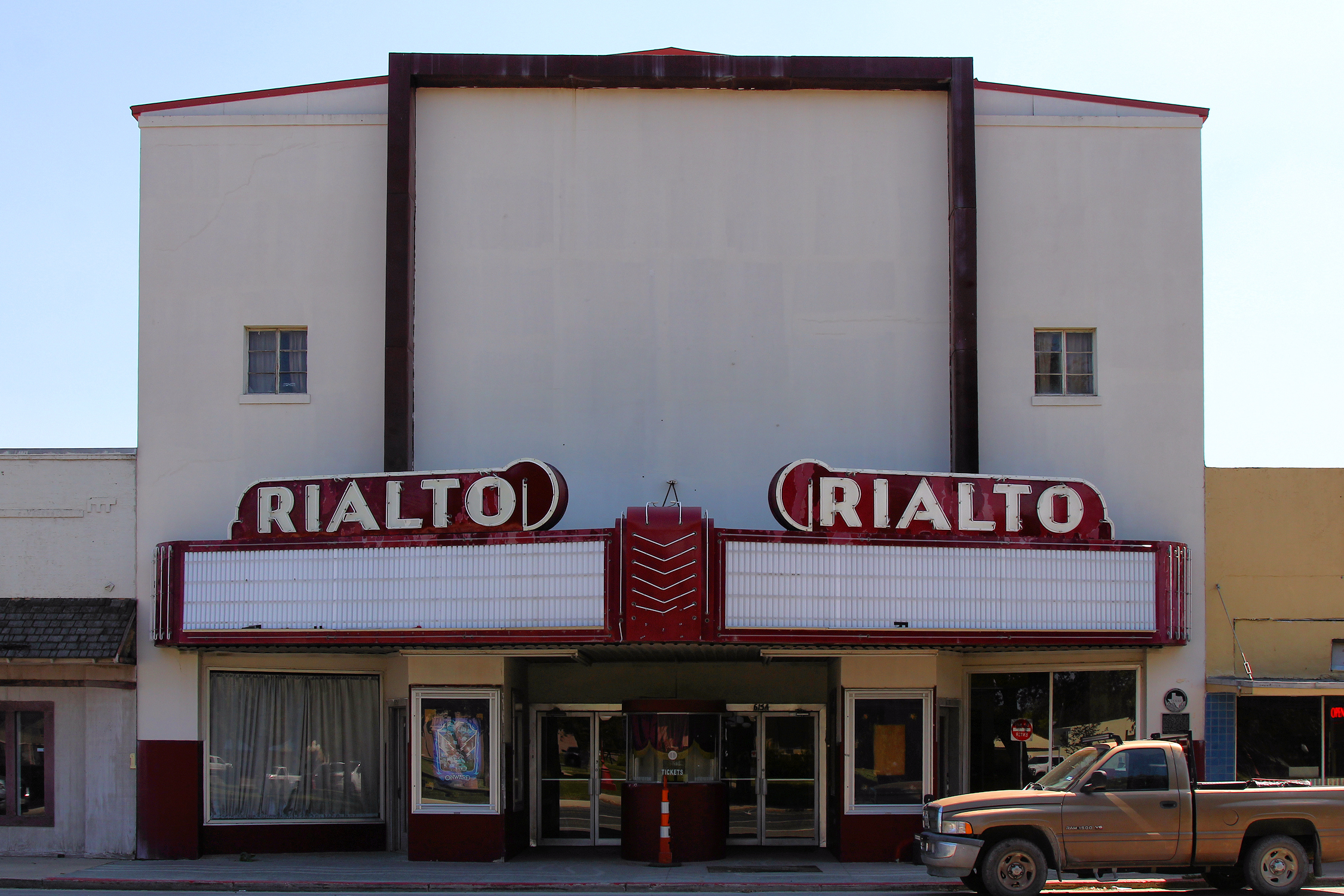
The Rialto Theater in Three Rivers, Texas

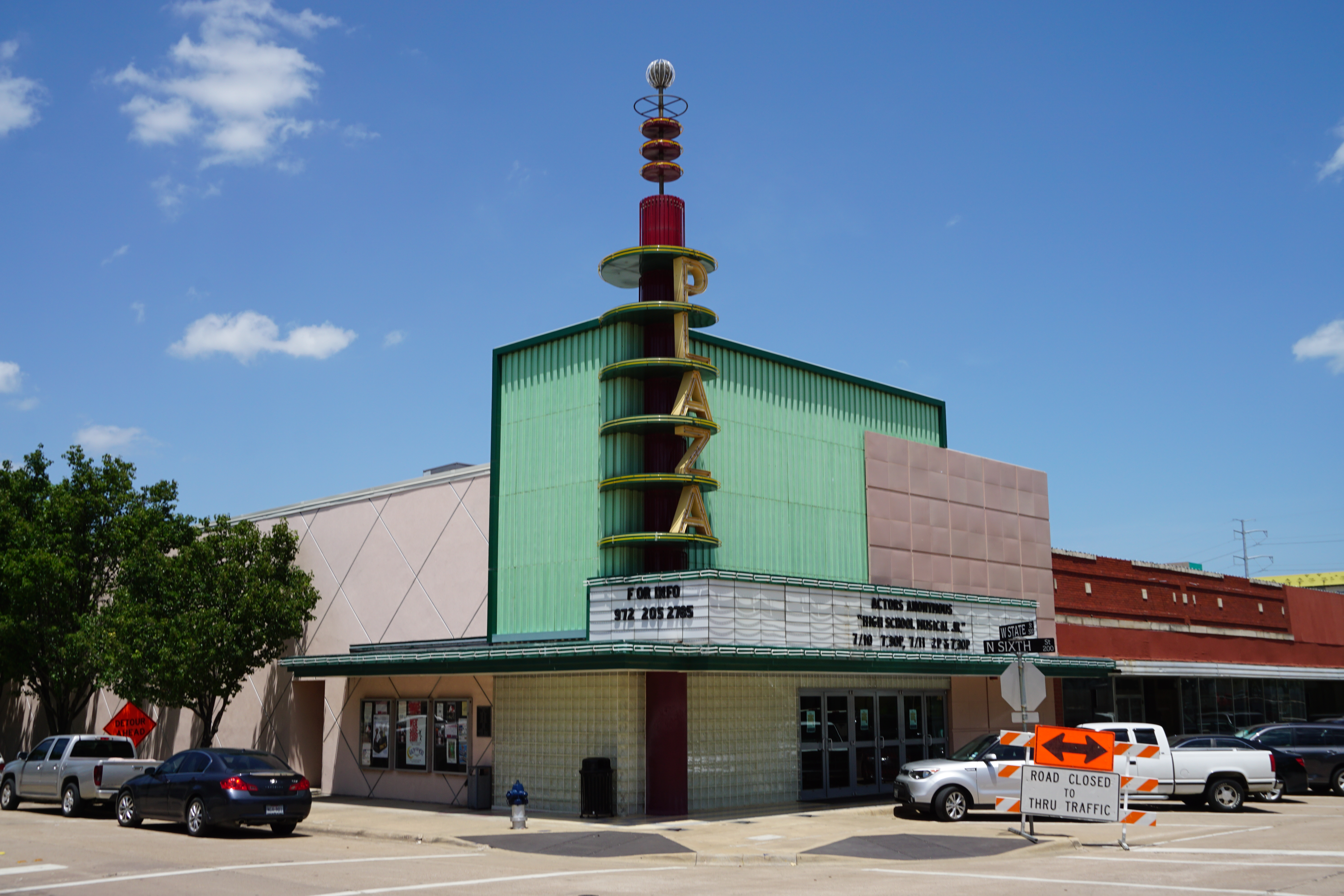
The Plaza Theater in Garland, Texas

- Agnew Theater in Oklahoma City
- Boomer Theater in Norman, Oklahoma
- Brauntex Theatre in New Braunfels, Texas
- Carver Theater (New Orleans) in New Orleans, Louisiana
- Centre Theatre in El Reno, Oklahoma
- Grove Theatre in Upland, California
- Hornbeck Theatre in Shawnee, Oklahoma
- Knob Hill Theater in Oklahoma City
- Lakeside Theater in Oklahoma City
- Leachman Theater in Stillwater, Oklahoma
- Lynn Theatre in Gonzales, Texas
- May Theater in Oklahoma City
- Morley Theatre in Borger, Texas
- National Theater (Texas) in Graham, Texas
- Paul Poag Theatre for the Performing Arts in Del Rio, Texas
- Plaza Theatre (Garland, Texas) in Garland, Texas
- Rialto Cinema in Alva, Oklahoma
- Rialto Theater (Three Rivers, Texas) in Three Rivers, Texas
- State Theater (Clovis, New Mexico) in Clovis, New Mexico
- Vernon Plaza Theatre in Vernon, Texas
- Washita Theatre in Chickasha, Oklahoma
- Westland Theater in Elk City, Oklahoma
- Will Rogers Theatre in Oklahoma City, Oklahoma
