= Brauntex Theatre =

- Brauntex Theater
- U.S. National Register of Historic Places
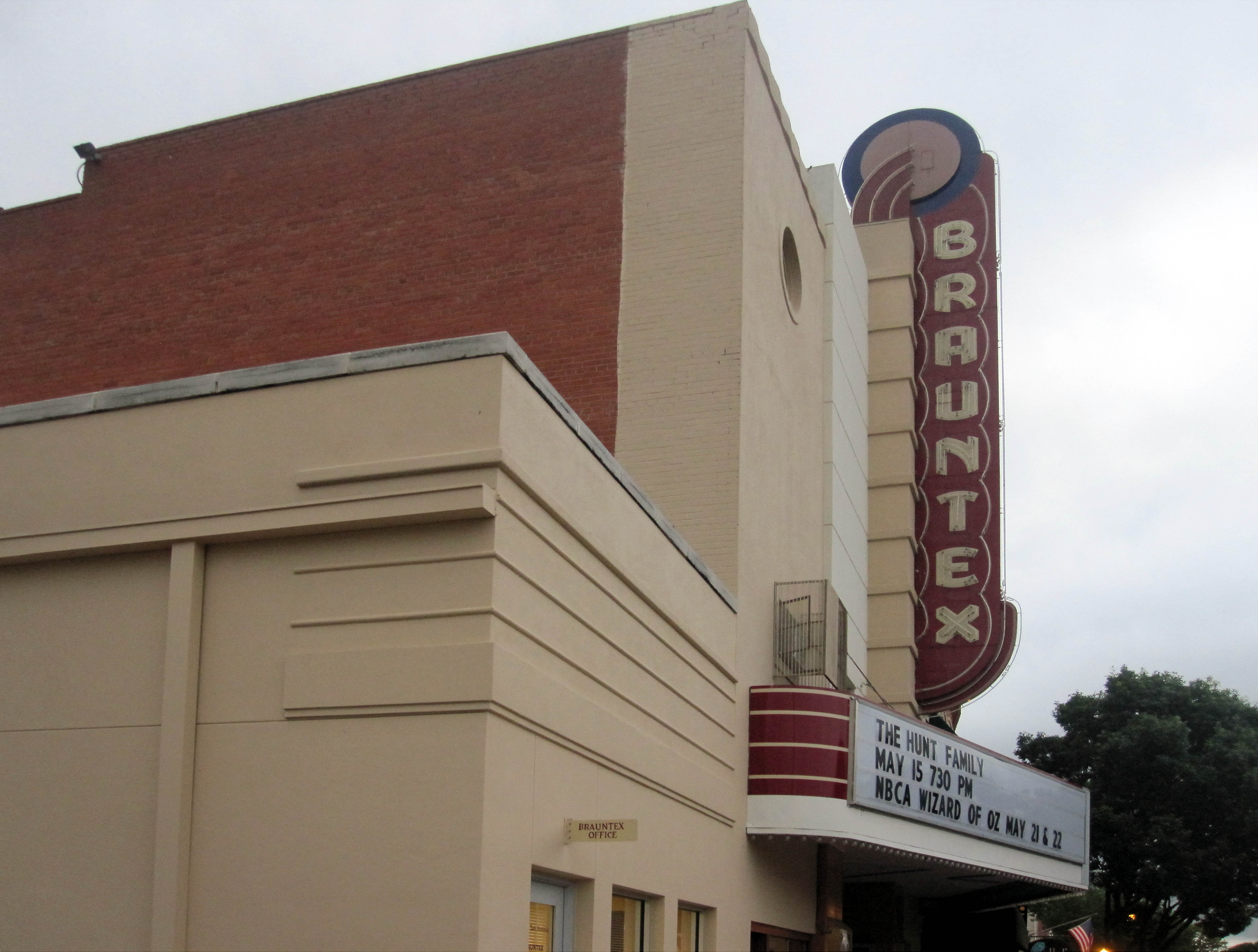
- Brauntex Theater in 2010

- Location within Texas Location within the United States
- Location: 290 W. San Antonio, New Braunfels, Texas
- Coordinates: 29°42′3″N 98°7′34″W
- Area: less than one acre
- Built: 1942
- Built by: Edwin A. Hanz, Hanz Construction Co.
- Architect: Jack Corgan, W.J. Moore
- Architectural style: Moderne
- NRHP reference No.: 08000240
- Added to NRHP: March 24, 2008

The Brauntex Theatre is a former movie palace (now a performing arts theater) located in downtown New Braunfels in the U.S. state of Texas. It was built in the late Art Deco period in 1942. It is listed on the National Register of Historic Places.

== History ==
The Brauntex Theatre first opened in downtown New Braunfels in January 1942. Pearl Harbor had just been attacked, and the United States was at war. Patrons needed a place where they could attempt to ease their worry of loved ones in the war and catch up on the status of the war. It premiered with Birth of the Blues, starring Bing Crosby. At the time there were many other operational theaters in the city, but when the state-of-the-art Brauntex Theatre opened, it was the best. A major fire in one of the other downtown theaters, the Palace, either just before or just after the Brauntex opened, made the new theater an even more welcome addition to the city. The Griffith Company owned the theater. Its design was copied from an earlier Griffith theater in New Cordell, Oklahoma, the Washita Theater. The old theater was an important part of downtown New Braunfels for fifty years. Many members of the staff recalls many highlights of the early movie operations such as the time that Pedro Gonzalez appeared while filming the John Wayne classic, The Alamo. The theater was integrated during the 1960s. After integration patrons could sit anywhere in the theater; 40 cents upstairs or 50 cents downstairs.

=== Renovation ===
Over time, this once grand facility declined. The gilded fittings of the Brauntex were covered in dust, the seats were broken and the theater smelled of cigarette smoke. In September 1998 a local group of city and county officials, artists, engineers, an attorney, a performing arts technician, bank officials and many other concerned citizens, came together to try to save the theater. As the plan grew, many in the city were eager to save the site. This group of 36 diverse participants had meetings, brainstorming the needs of the building as well as its potential uses. They decided to remodel the movie palace into a theater to be run by the Brauntex Performing Arts Theatre Association.

The plan had to be set aside due to the October 1998 Central Texas floods. When the city of New Braunfels had recovered, the plan to renovate the Brauntex was put back into place. In July 1999 corporate non-profit status was acquired, the Association elected officers and directors and contracted a management consultant and a grant writer. On August 31, 1999 the earnest money contract was signed and on December 10, 1999 the Association became proud owners of the dilapidated gem, the Brauntex Theatre.

Almost immediately after the Association acquired the property, renovation begun. Plans were drawn, ideas were submitted, and money was raised to give this structure a much needed face-lift. One of the first tasks the Association had was expanding the tiny movie theater stage, into a large performing arts stage. The other major structural change was to restore the balcony to its former glory, as the previous owner had closed it off to create a second theater.

The renovation crew included many different local groups who volunteered to assist, including the USMC Junior ROTC from New Braunfels High School. The renovation was completed quickly and the grand reopening of the Brauntex Theatre had the San Antonio Symphony grace their stage.

== See also ==
- National Register of Historic Places listings in Comal County, Texas
