= Corgan (company) =

American architecture firm

Corgan Associates, Inc.
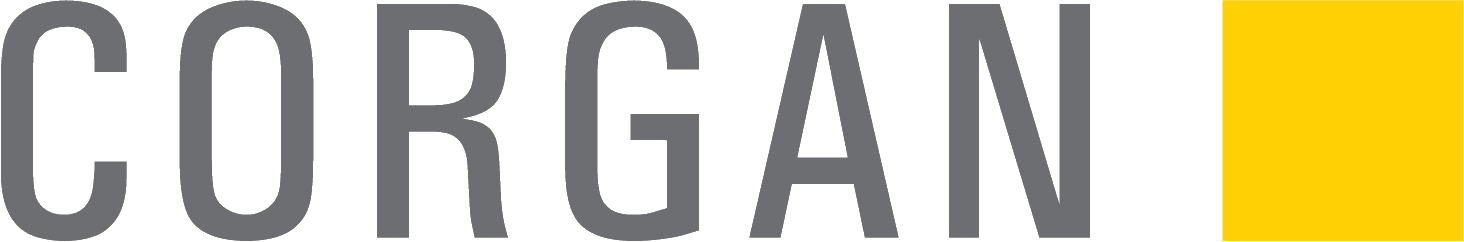
- Type: Private
- Industry: Architecture
- Founded: 1938; 88 years ago Dallas, Texas
- Founders: Jack Corgan
- Headquarters: Dallas, Texas, U.S.
- Number of locations: 23 offices
- Area served: Worldwide
- Key people: Scott Ruch (CEO); Lindsay Wilson (president)
- Services: Architecture; Brand Design; Interior Design; Sustainable Design; Workplace Consulting; Urban Design & Planning
- Revenue: ▲US$675.75 million (2025)
- Number of employees: 1400+ (2026)
- Website: www.corgan.com

Corgan Associates, Inc., commonly known as Corgan, is an American multinational architecture and design firm headquartered in Dallas, Texas. It is one of the largest architecture firms in the world, both by revenue and number of architects. Corgan reported a revenue of US$675.75 million in 2025 and employs over 1400 professionals across 23 offices worldwide.

The firm provides architectural services in various sectors, including aviation, commercial, data centers, education, healthcare, mixed-use, multifamily, offices, and workplaces.

== History ==
Founded in 1938 by Jack Corgan in Dallas, Texas, Corgan initially focused on designing movie theaters and drive-ins. In the mid-20th century, the firm became known for its work on hotels along Route 66 and movie palaces in small towns such as Vernon, Texas, and Chickasha, Oklahoma. During this period, Corgan designed over 90 movie theaters, some of which have been preserved as historic landmarks.

In 1956, Corgan was selected to design the Dallas Love Field Airport Terminal, which served as the primary airport for Dallas at the time. The terminal's design incorporated features such as a mezzanine dining room and moving walkways, which were considered advanced concept for that period.

In 1979, the firm formalized its data center architecture practice, and by 2018, it had completed more than 1,200 data centers worldwide.

In 2025, Corgan acquired the Boston-based interior design firm Dyer Brown & Associates and the New York-based architecture and urban design firm Cooper Robertson.

In 2026, Corgan acquired the Washington, D.C.-based architecture firm FOX Architects, the New York-based architecture firm WCGS Architects, and the North Carolina-based architecture firm Duda|Paine Architects.

== Offices ==
Corgan maintains 23 offices worldwide, with its headquarters in Dallas, Texas. The firm has additional U.S. locations in major cities, including New York, Los Angeles, Chicago, and San Francisco. International locations include London, Singapore, and Dublin.

== Rankings ==
- #1 in Top 30 Data Center Architecture Firms for 2025
- #3 in Top 70 Airport Facility Architecture Firms for 2025
- #4 in Architectural Record's Top 300 Architecture Firms of 2026
- #4 in Top 200 Architecture Firms for 2026
- #8 in Interior Design's Top 100 Giants for 2026

== Notable projects ==
Sacramento International Airport – Central Terminal B, Sacramento, California (2011)

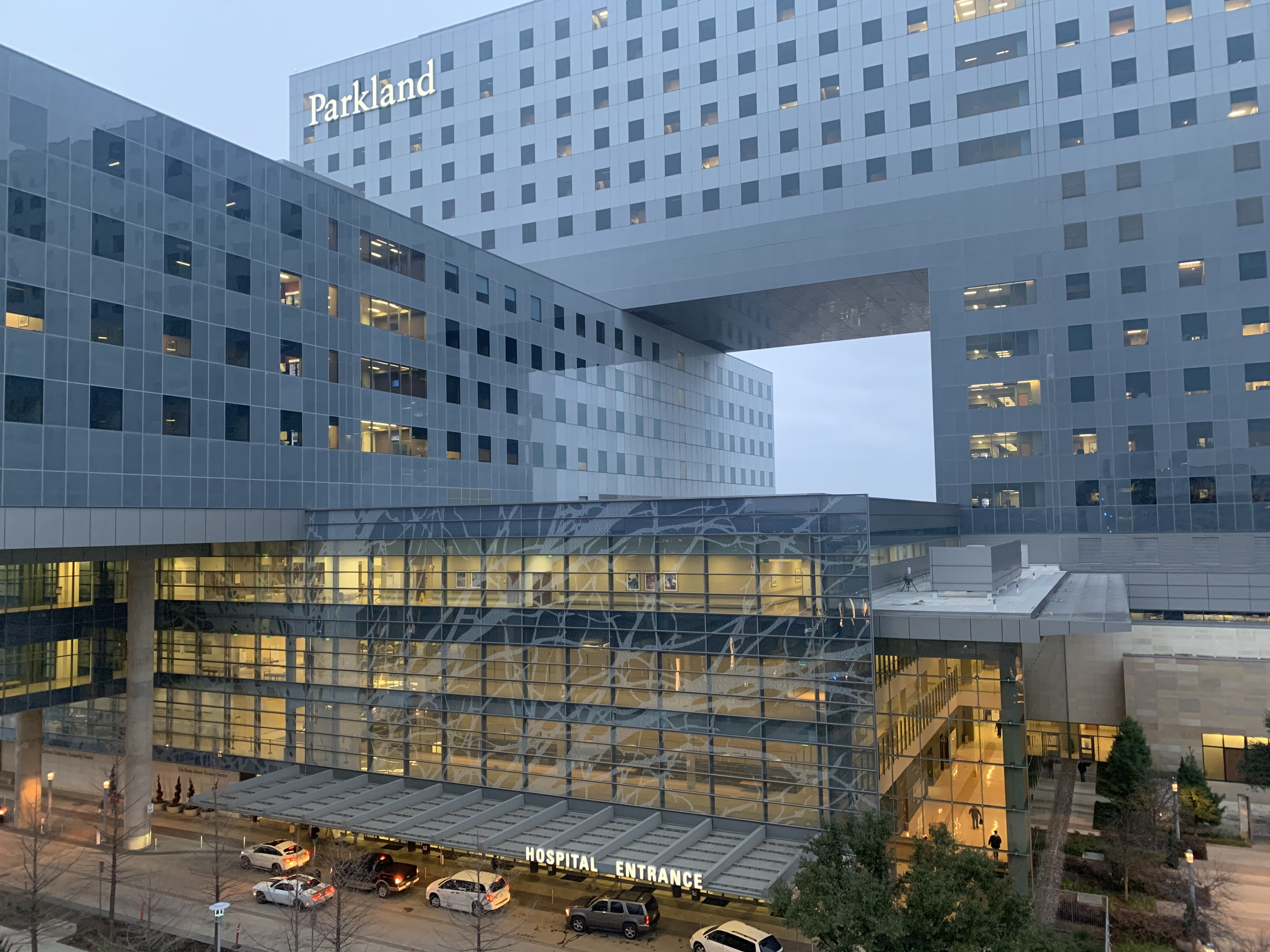
New Parkland Hospital, Dallas, Texas (2015)

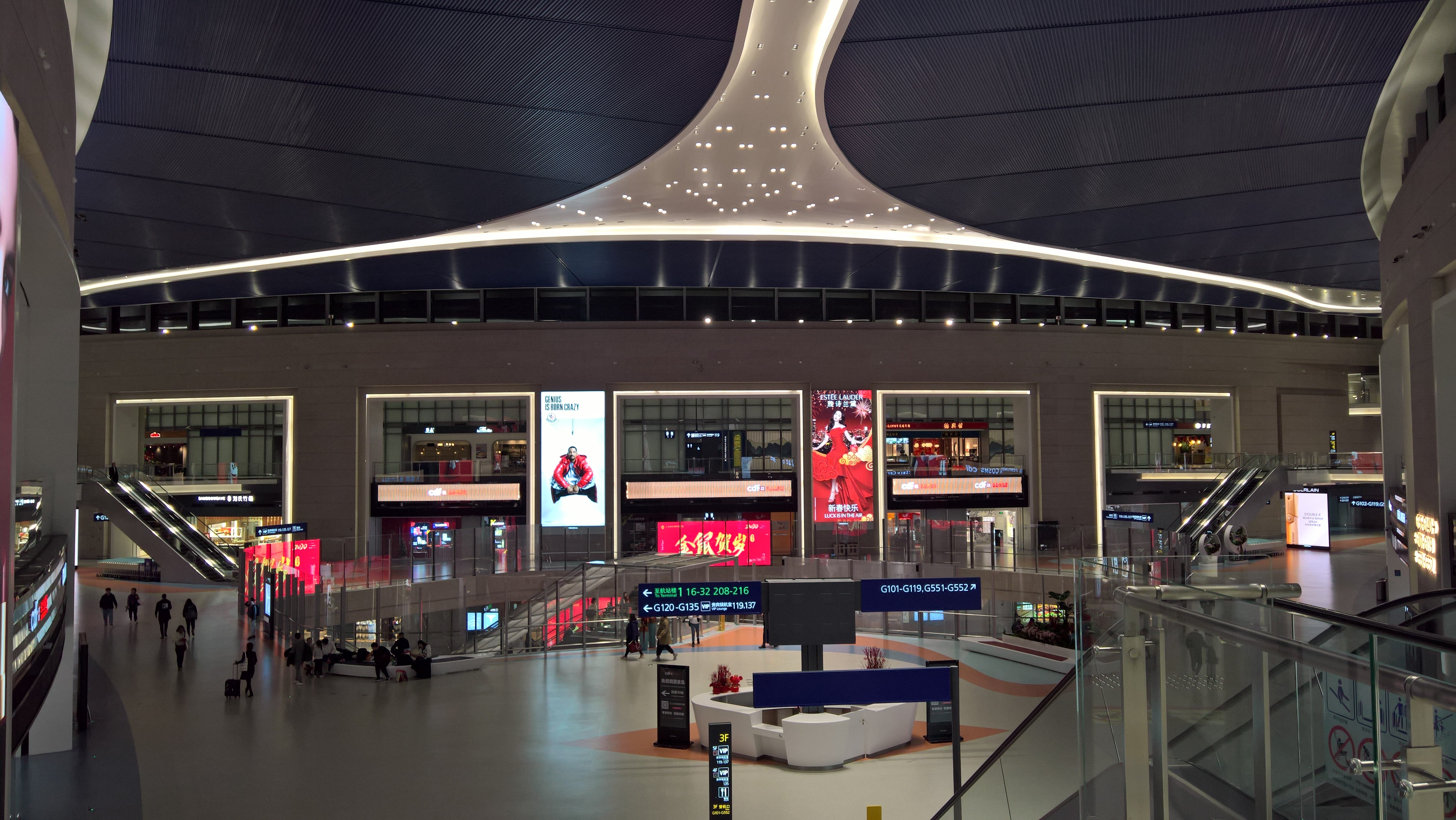
Shanghai Pudong International Airport – Satellite Terminal, Shanghai, China (2014)

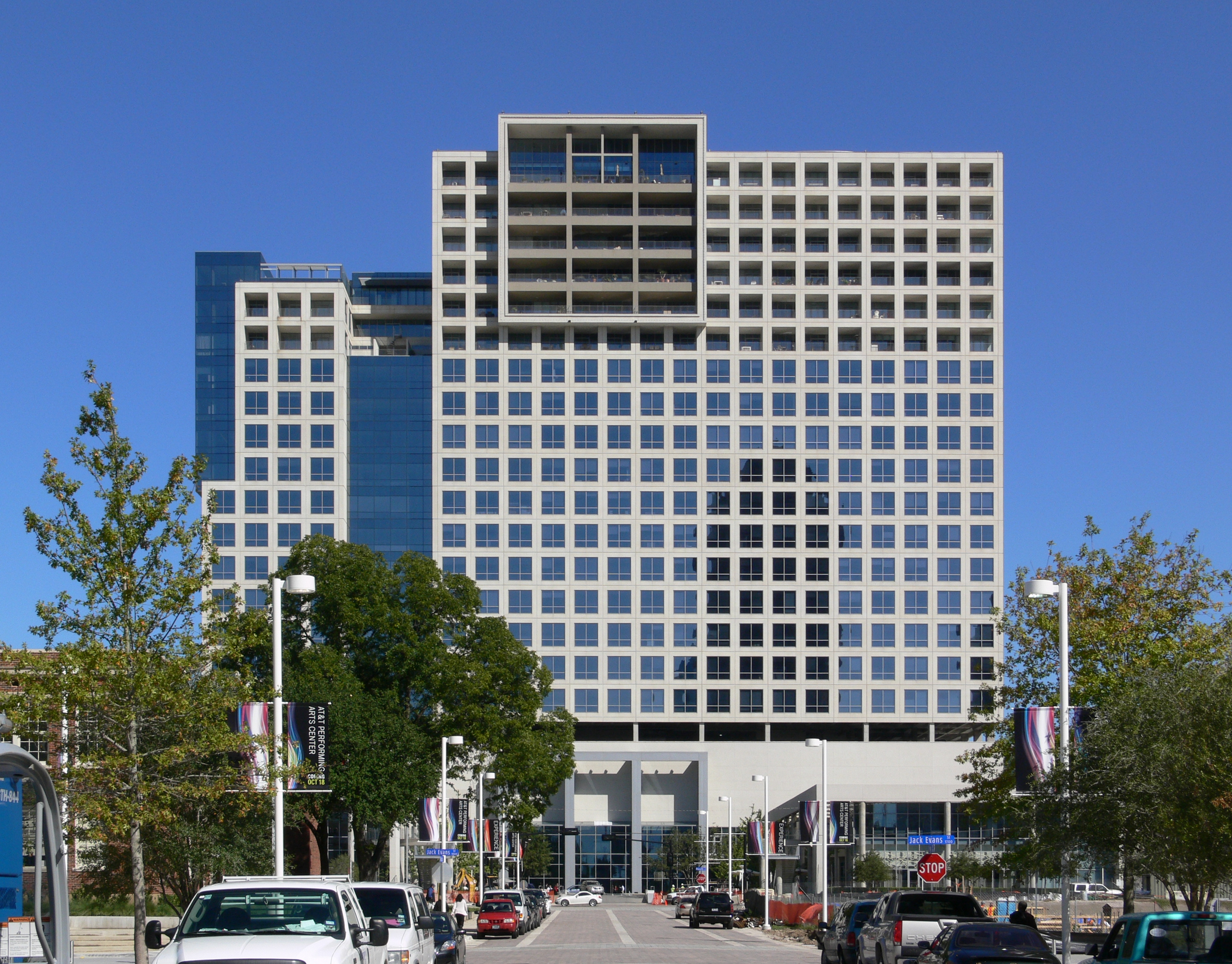
One Arts Plaza, Dallas, Texas (2007)

- John F. Kennedy International Airport – Terminal 6
- New Parkland Hospital
- NTT Global Data Centers
- Toyota North America Headquarters
- O'Hare International Airport – Global Terminal
- Keurig Dr Pepper Headquarters
- Microsoft Data Centers
- John Fitzgerald Kennedy Memorial Restoration
- Shanghai Pudong International Airport – South Satellite Concourse
- Dallas/Fort Worth International Airport – Terminal D
- New York LaGuardia Airport – Terminal C
- Charles Schwab Corporation Headquarters
- Coresite Data Centers
- Atlanta International Airport – Concourse D-Widening, MHJIT, Concourse-B Delta Sky Club, AMEX Centurion Club, Airside Modernization Project
- QTS Data Centers
- Los Angeles International Airport – West Gates at Tom Bradley International Terminal
- Hollywood Burbank Airport – New Terminal
- San Antonio International Airport – Terminal C
- Dallas Love Field Airport & Terminal Modernization
- Sacramento International Airport – Central Terminal B
- China Construction Bank Data Center Complex
- Harwood No. 14 Office Tower
- Nashville International Airport – Expansion and Renovation
- The Empire State Building Observatory Museum
- CyrusOne Data Centers
- One Arts Plaza
- Moody Performance Hall
- Phoenix Sky Harbor International Airport – Terminal 4 South 1 Concourse
- Wells Fargo Campus
- Frisco High School
- McKinney National Airport
- I.M. Terrell Visual and Performing Arts Center
