= Richard McKay =

American conductor (born 1982)

- McKay in 2025

Background information
- Genres: Orchestral, Operatic
- Occupation: Conductor
- Website: richardmckaymusic.com

Richard McKay (born 1982) is an American conductor, currently serving as music director of the Dallas Chamber Symphony.

== Education ==
McKay holds a Doctor of Musical Arts degree in orchestral conducting from the Peabody Institute, where he studied with Gustav Meier and Markand Thakar and served as assistant conductor of the Peabody orchestras and opera. He earned a Master of Music degree in orchestral conducting, and a Bachelor of Music degree in piano performance, from the University of Texas at Austin, where he was music director of the University Orchestra and led productions at the Butler Opera Center.

McKay attended the Aspen Music Festival as a fellowship conductor and the Cabrillo Festival of Contemporary Music as an apprentice conductor under Marin Alsop, where he led the world premiere of Clint Needham's Radiant Nation. He received additional training through festivals and masterclasses with conductors Kurt Masur, Larry Rachleff, Mark Gibson, Robert Spano, Neeme Järvi, Paavo Järvi, Leonard Slatkin, Kenneth Kiesler and Leon Fleisher.

== Career ==
McKay began his conducting career at the Baltimore Symphony while at Peabody, and the Dallas Symphony during the tenure of Jaap van Zweden. In 2011, he became the music director of the Dallas Chamber Symphony, where he is credited with spurring the orchestra's artistic growth. During his directorship he has led notable collaborations with artists Anton Nel, Chee-Yun Kim, Kenny Broberg, Kazuhiro Takagi, and Joe Kraemer. He founded the Dallas Chamber Symphony's TechNotes and Taking It to the Streets education and outreach programs, which have been funded by the National Endowment for the Arts. He also established the orchestra's Dallas International Piano and Violin competitions.

Among the orchestras that McKay has conducted are the Fort Worth Symphony, Dallas Opera Orchestra, Cincinnati Symphony, Charlotte Symphony, Omaha Symphony, and Baltimore Chamber Orchestra. He is active as a conductor of training orchestras as well, having worked with the Greater Dallas Youth Orchestra, and ensembles at the Cincinnati College-Conservatory, Cleveland Institute of Music, Manhattan School of Music and the Royal Conservatoire of Scotland. In 2024 he was given the Dallas History Makers award by the Dallas Historical Society for Excellence in Arts Leadership. In 2025, he was announced a winner of D CEO's leadership excellence award for his work with the Dallas Chamber Symphony.

== Recordings ==
- Joseph Thalken, Aaron Copland, Chasing Home, Appalachian Spring Suite, Dallas Chamber Symphony, Albany Records, 2024.
- Tsontakis, Anasa, David Krakauer clarinet, Aspen Music Festival, AACA, 2013.
- Sibelius, Symphony No. 1 in E minor, Aspen Music Festival, AACA, 2013.
- R. Schumann, Symphony No. 4 in D minor, Manhattan School of Music Symphony, MSM, 2010.
