= Moody Performance Hall =

Performing arts venue in Dallas, Texas

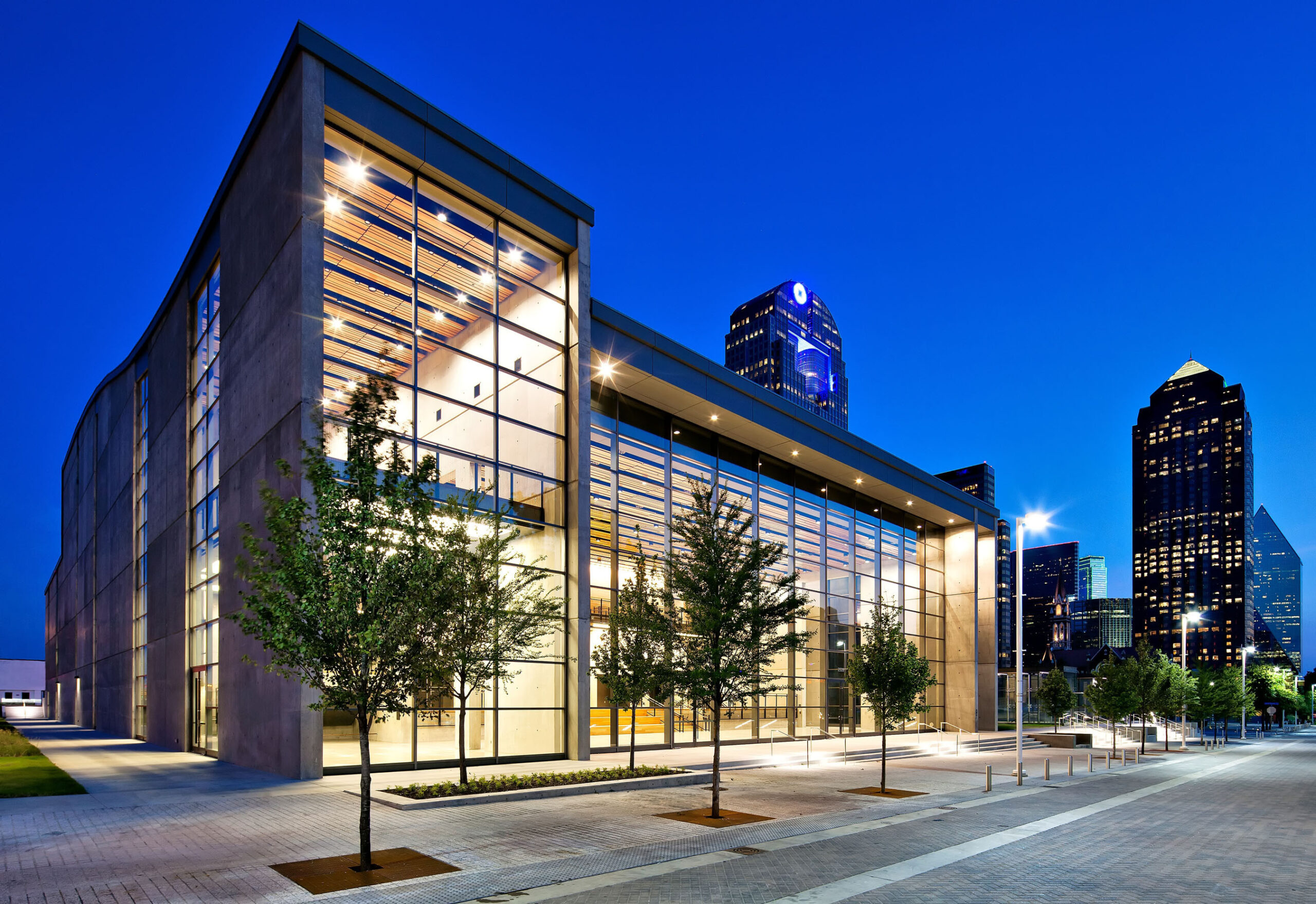
- Moody Performance Hall
- Interactive map of Moody Performance Hall
- Former names: Dallas City Performance Hall
- Address: 2520 Flora Street; Dallas, Texas; United States
- Coordinates: 32.7907°N 96.7958°W
- Owner: City of Dallas Office of Cultural Affairs
- Operator: City of Dallas Office of Cultural Affairs
- Capacity: 750
- Type: Performing arts center
- Public transit: DART: Pearl/Arts District, M-Line: Olive & Flora

Construction
- Opened: September 13, 2012
- Architect: Skidmore, Owings & Merrill

Website
- moody.dallasculture.org

The Moody Performance Hall (formerly Dallas City Performance Hall) is a performing arts venue located in the Arts District of Downtown Dallas, Texas, US. Designed by Skidmore, Owings & Merrill LLP (SOM) in collaboration with the Architect of Record, Corgan Associates, Inc., and constructed by the City of Dallas, the performance hall will be built in two phases. Phase I, which consists of the 750-seat proscenium theater and its support spaces, was completed in 2012. The project will be LEED Platinum. Funding for the performance hall was provided by the Citizens of Dallas through the 2006 Bond Program.

The project team included:

Design Architect: Skidmore, Owings & Merrill
Architect of Record: Corgan Associates, Inc.
Theater Consultants: Schuler Shook
Acoustics: Jaffe Holden
Cost Estimators: Donnell Consultants, Inc.
Construction Manager: McCarthy
