= Charlie Chaplin comics =

Comic strips based on Charlie Chaplin

Charlie Chaplin comics have been published in the United States, the United Kingdom, and Europe. Charlie Chaplin comic strips first appeared in 1915 in the U.S. and the U.K., cashing in on the tremendous popularity of the comedian at the time; they were some of the earliest comics inspired by the popularity of a celebrity. Although Charlie Chaplin comic strips didn't enjoy enduring popularity in the U.S., a Chaplin comic strip was published in the U.K. from 1915 until the late 1940s, while in France there were Chaplin comics published for more than 50 years.

As a youngster growing up in England, Charlie Chaplin himself was a fan of comics and comic strips. There is evidence that comic strip tramp characters like Tom Browne's Weary Willie and Tired Tim and Frederick Opper's Happy Hooligan influenced the development of Chaplin's the Tramp. Chaplin said to scholar Peter Haining:

Ah, those comics, the wonderfully vulgar paper for boys with 'Casey Court' pictures in them, and 'The Adventures of Weary Willie and Tired Tim,' two famous tramps with the world against them. There's been a lot said about how I evolved the little tramp character who made my name. Deep, psychological stuff has been written about how I meant him to be a symbol of the class war, of the love-hate concept, the death wish and what-all. But if you want the simple Chaplin truth behind the Chaplin legend, I started the little tramp simply to make people laugh and because those other old tramps, Weary Willie and Tired Tim, had always made me laugh.

== Charlie Chapin comics by country ==
=== United States ===
Chaplin appeared in two short-lived syndicated comic strips in the U.S. in the period 1915–1917. Characters based on the Tramp subsequently appeared in many American comic books, often as guest stars in superhero comics published by DC Comics and Marvel Comics.

==== Charlie Chaplin's Comic Capers ====
Charlie Chaplin's Comic Capers was an American gag-a-day celebrity comics strip by Stuart Carothers and later Elzie C. Segar. Charlie Chaplin's Comic Capers was published in the Chicago Herald, and ran in syndication from 1915 to 1917. Segar took over the strip in early 1916. Contrary to his predecessors, who mostly borrowed ideas from Chaplin's films, Segar thought up his own jokes. He gave Chaplin a tiny sidekick named "Luke the Gook" to act as a straight man to his gags. The daily strip ran until July 15, 1916, with the Sunday version running until September 16, 1917.

Despite Chaplin's popularity, the comic strip wasn't a huge success in the United States, mostly due to the fact that all artists involved were essentially amateurs. In 1917, however, five "best of" collection books of the strip were published by M.A. Donohue & Co.

==== Return Engagement of Pa's Imported Son-in-Law ====
A cartoonist named Ed Carey created an unauthorized Charlie Chaplin comic strip in 1915. Originally called Pa's Imported Son-In-Law (begun by Charles H. Wellington in 1913), Carey restyled the strip as Return Engagement of Pa's Imported Son-in-Law (it was also known as Pa's Family and Their Friends). A Charlie Chaplin lookalike became a recurring character in the strip, which lasted until 1916, syndicated by Newspaper Feature Service.

==== The Fuhrer and the Tramp ====
In 2018, American cartoonist Sean McArdle published via Kickstarter The Führer and the Tramp, a speculative fiction graphic novel about Chaplin's battle with Adolf Hitler, co-starring Errol Flynn and Hedy Lamarr.

=== United Kingdom ===
A Charlie Chaplin comic strip in the United Kingdom lasted much longer than Charlie Chaplin's Comic Capers, published from 1915 until at least the late 1940s. Published by Amalgamated Press in the weekly comics magazine Funny Wonder, the Charlie Chaplin strip was usually drawn by Bertie Brown and appeared from 1915 to 1944, often on the cover. Other artists who worked on the Charle Chaplin strip included Reg Parlett, Freddie Adkins, Don Newhouse, Roy Wilson, Henry Puttick, and Wally Robertson.

A Charlie Chaplin Fun Book was published by Amalgamated Press in 1915.

After World War II, the Charlie Chaplin strip moved to Film Fun, also published by Amalgamated Press. Now called Charlie Chaplin — the Film Fun Maker, the strip was drawn by Terence Wakefield.

In recent years, the British alternative cartoonist Richard Cowdry created a comic strip called Fat Charlie Chaplin.

=== France ===
In 1922, Raoul Thomen, a Belgian cartoonist, created the French-language strip Les Aventures Acrobatiques de Charlot ("Charlot's Acrobatic Adventures"). (Charlie Chaplin was known as "Charlot" in France.) Thomen's strip ran in children's magazines like Cri-Cri (and later Boum!, L'As, and L'Épatant) for nearly 20 years. Charlot's comic strip adventures were continued by other artists — including C. Rojo, Mat (Marcel Turlin), Pierre Lacroix, Jean-Claude Forest — lasting until 1963. The strip was collected in many albums.

Charlot comics in various forms were published in France until 1974, along with academic scholarship on the subject. In 2014, for the Tramp's 100th anniversary, a comic art museum in Bordeaux (La Cité internationale de la bande dessinée et de l'image) mounted an exhibition of French, British, and American Chaplin strips.

=== Romania ===
In the 1940s, Pascal Radulescu drew his version of Charlie Chaplin comic strips in Romania.

=== Classics/Williams ===
The Spanish comics artist Vicente Torregrosa Manrique (known as "Torregrosa") illustrated Charlie Chaplin Classics in 1973–1974 for Classics/Williams, published in German, Dutch, and Norwegian. (These series ran between 13 and 16 issues.) Stories from the series were collected in a 1974 annual, as well as by the British publisher Brown Watson.

=== Italy ===
In 1985, the Italian cartoonist Sergio Zaniboni created a short story starring Chaplin for Il Giornalino.

== Biographical comics ==
A number of countries published serious biographies of Chaplin in comics form. In France in the early 1980s, Claude-Jean Philippe and Patrick Lesueur produced two biographies: Saint Charlot and Mister Charles. In Mexico, Ramón Alonso illustrated a comic book biography of Chaplin for Vidas Ilustres.

== See also ==
- Gifford, Denis with Mike Higgs. The Comic Art of Charlie Chaplin: a Graphic Celebration of Chaplin's Centenary (Hawk Books ISBN 0-948248-21-1).

== Sources ==
- Inge, M. Thomas. Comics as Culture (University Press of Mississippi, 1990) ISBN 9780878054084
