= Charlie Chaplin's Comic Capers =

American comic strip

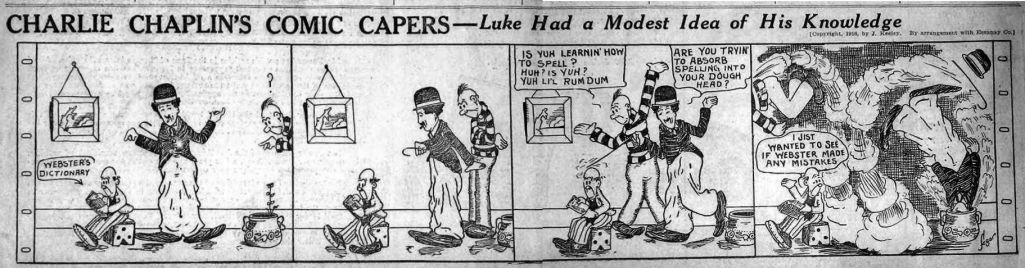
- Daily comic from E.C. Segar's tenure on the series.
- Author(s): Stuart Wallace Carothers, Warren & Ramsey, Elzie Crisler Segar
- Current status/schedule: Canceled
- Launch date: 29 March 1915; 111 years ago
- End date: September 16, 1917; 109 years ago
- Syndicate(s): Keeley-Handy Syndicate
- Publisher(s): Chicago Herald, M.A. Donohue & Co.
- Genre(s): Gag-a-day, Humor Slapstick

Charlie Chaplin's Comic Capers is an American gag-a-day celebrity comic strip by Stuart Carothers and later Elzie C. Segar starring Charlie Chaplin. It ran in syndication from March 29, 1915, until September 16, 1917. It was one of the earliest comic strips inspired by the popularity of a celebrity.

== Background ==
Charlie Chaplin's Comic Capers was produced by the Chicago-based J. Keeley Syndicate and published in the Chicago Herald. The comic strip cashed in on the tremendous popularity of the comedian at the time. Chaplin was depicted as his popular The Little Tramp character. The strip was created by Stewart W. Carothers in March 1915, who drew and wrote the stories until his tragic early death from defenestration. Two cartoonists credited as Warren and Ramsey took over the series until they were replaced by Elzie C. Segar, early in his career. On February 29, 1916, Segar published his first Chaplin strip. The daily version ran until July 15, 1916. His Sunday version ran longer, from March 12, 1916, until September 16, 1917. It was his first professional cartooning job. Contrary to his predecessors, who mostly borrowed ideas from Chaplin's films, Segar thought up his own jokes. He gave Chaplin a tiny sidekick named "Luke the Gook" to act as a straight man to his gags.

== Collections ==
In 1917, five books were published by M.A. Donohue & Co., in 'Best of' style collections, four of them being painting/coloring books. These books are considered to be from the Platinum Age.

Published collections;

- Charlie Chaplin's Comic Capers, Series 1, No 315
- Charlie Chaplin in the Movies, No 316
- Charlie Chaplin Up in the Air, No 317
- Charlie Chaplin in the Army, No 318
- Charlie Chaplin's Funny Stunts, in Full Color, No. 380

== Reception ==
Despite Chaplin's popularity, the comic strip was not a huge success in the United States. It fared better in the U.K., where it was published in the weekly comics magazine Funny Wonder for decades.

== See also ==
- Inside Woody Allen, another newspaper comic strip based on a comedic film performer.
- Charlie Chaplin comics
