= The Führer and the Tramp =

2021 graphic novel by Sean McArdle, Jon Judy and Dexter Wee

- Cover art by Dexter Wee and Sean McArdle.

Publication information
- Genre: Alternate history Metafiction; Adventure fiction
- Publication date: June 28, 2021

Creative team
- Written by: Sean McArdle; Jon Judy
- Penciller: Dexter Wee
- Letterer: Sean McArdle
- Colorist: Sean McArdle
- Editor: Andy Schmidt

Collected editions
- Paperback: ISBN 9781954412064

The Führer and the Tramp is an alternate history graphic novel by Sean McArdle and Jon Judy published in 2021 by Source Point Press. The book tells the story of Charlie Chaplin fighting Adolf Hitler and the Nazis while filming The Great Dictator.

== Publication history ==
In 2015, McArdle, Judy and Wee began work on the graphic novel, which was self-published via Kickstarter four years later in 2019. In 2020, Source Point Press released the comic as a five-issue mini series. It was collected as a graphic novel in 2021.

== Plot ==
The year is 1939, and Charlie Chaplin is mistaken for a Jew while attending the Berlin premiere of the Leni Riefenstahl film Olympia. While attempting to flee the Nazi police, Chaplin disrupts the screening and embarrasses Adolf Hitler.

After returning to Hollywood, Chaplin is encouraged to complete his political satire comedy-drama film, The Great Dictator, by Franklin Delano Roosevelt Jr. Roosevelt assigns two of his undercover agents, Errol Flynn and Hedy Lamarr, to help Chaplin finish his movie, and to help protect him from Nazi saboteurs.

In order to hide from the saboteurs, Chaplin, Lamarr and Flynn sail to London on Flynn's yacht, the Zaca. Upon reaching their destination, they begin shooting at Pinewood Studios, aided by Alfred Hitchcock. The filming is interrupted by the Bombing of London, and the kidnapping of Charlie's brother, Sydney Chaplin.

The trio plan to rescue Sydney from Hitler's secret base, and employ the covert British team, The Ministry of Ungentlemanly Warfare. The team consists of Ian Fleming, Christopher Lee, Josephine Baker and Jon Pertwee. After rescuing Sydney, and uncovering Hitler's plans for the Holocaust, the group escape via a blimp captained by Hitchcock.

The book ends with a prelude showing all of the major characters attending the premiere of The Great Dictator.

== Main characters ==
- Charlie Chaplin
- Hedy Lamarr
- Errol Flynn
- Adolf Hitler
- Sydney Chaplin
- Franklin Delano Roosevelt Jr.
- Leni Riefenstahl
- Alfred Hitchcock
- Ian Fleming
- Christopher Lee
- Josephine Baker
- Jon Pertwee

== Reception ==
The Führer and the Tramp received considerable attention in the comics and mainstream book press; it was extremely well received and was nominated for an Eisner (see below).

Jason Stacks at Comics Bulletin said, “The Fuhrer and the Tramp was one of the most fun surprises I’ve had this year. I had no idea what to expect from this oddball concept, but this turned out to be a perfect end-of-summer blockbuster."

Fanbase Press said, "All in all, this is a great, highly entertaining comic. If you’re a fan of classic Hollywood, action comedies, and good, old-fashioned Nazi fighting, you’ll definitely want to check out The Fuhrer and the Tramp."

Paul at The Pullbox said of the digital comic, "This was one of my favorite reads, my favorite titles, and I hope to have a hardcopy of it sitting on my bookshelf sometime in the future."

Steve Leitman at Reading with a Flight Ring said, 'There is a lot to like about this and there is a lot of promise of what's to come. It is an interesting premise with delightful takes on film stars of days past wrapped up in some stellar interiors."

== Awards and recognition ==
In 2019 The Führer and the Tramp was nominated for an Eisner Award for Best Digital Comic.
