= Charlie Chaplin =

English actor and filmmaker (1889–1977)

Sir Charlie Chaplin KBE
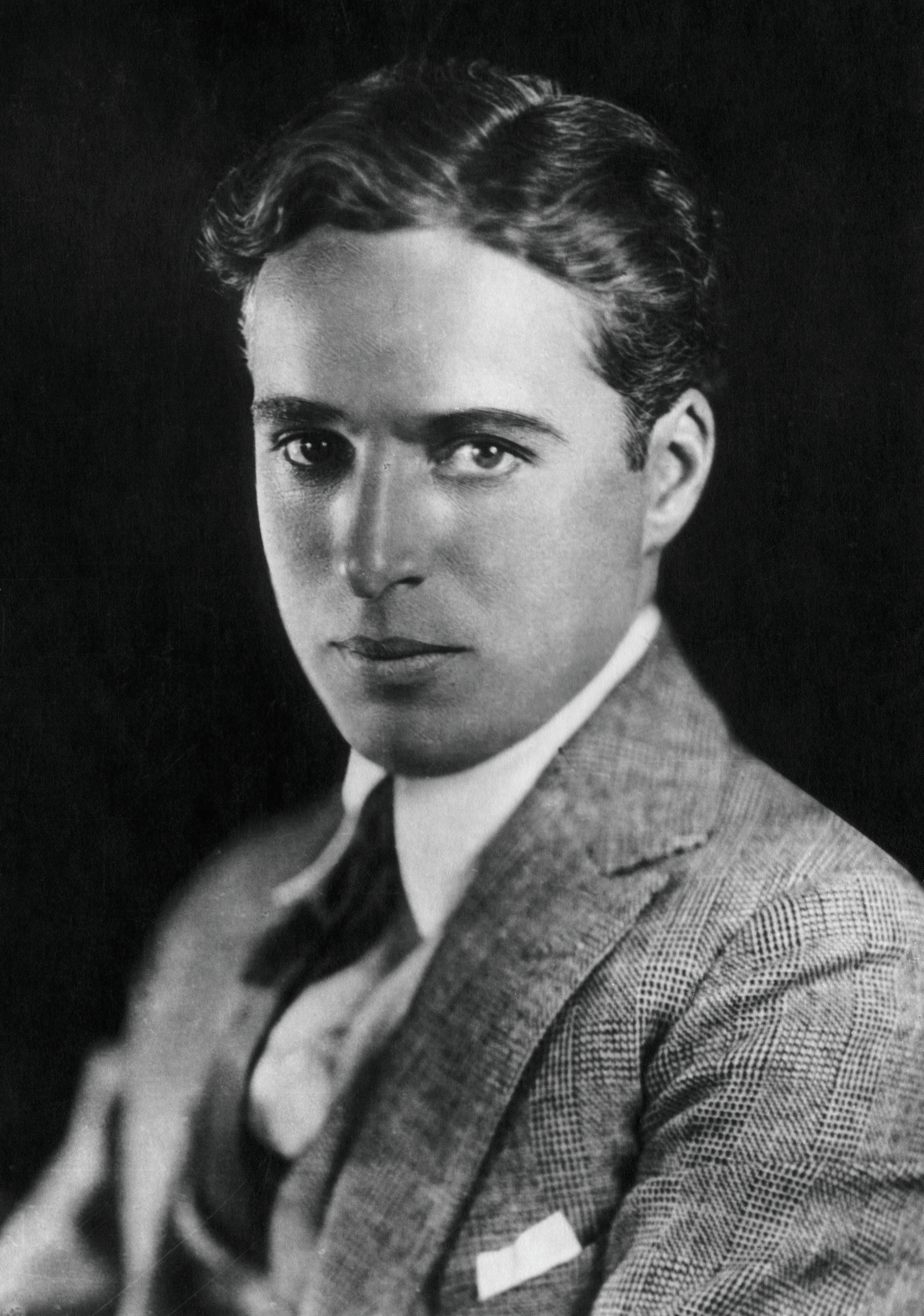
- Chaplin in 1921
- Born: Charles Spencer Chaplin Jr. 16 April 1889; London, England
- Died: 25 December 1977 (aged 88); Corsier-sur-Vevey, Vaud, Switzerland
- Burial place: Cimetière de Corsier-sur-Vevey, Corsier-sur-Vevey, Switzerland
- Occupations: Actor; comedian; director; composer; screenwriter; producer; editor; singer
- Years active: 1899–1976
- Works: Full list
- Spouses: Mildred Harris (m. 1918; div. 1920); Lita Grey (m. 1924; div. 1927); Paulette Goddard (m. 1936; div. 1942); Oona O'Neill (m. 1943)
- Children: 11, including Charles III, Sydney, Geraldine, Michael, Josephine, Victoria, Eugene, and Christopher
- Parent(s): Charles Chaplin Sr. Hannah Hill
- Relatives: Chaplin family
- Website: charliechaplin.com

Sir Charles Spencer Chaplin Jr. (16 April 1889 – 25 December 1977) was an English comic actor, filmmaker, singer, film editor and composer who rose to fame in the era of silent film. He became a worldwide icon through his screen persona, the Tramp, and is considered one of the film industry's most important figures. His career spanned more than 75 years, from his childhood in the Victorian era until a year before his death in 1977.

Chaplin's childhood in London was one of poverty and hardship. His father was absent and his mother struggled financially – he was sent to a workhouse twice before the age of nine. When he was 14, his mother was committed to a mental asylum. Chaplin began performing at an early age, touring music halls and later working as a stage actor and comedian. At 19, he was signed to the Fred Karno company, which took him to the United States. In 1914, Chaplin gained widespread popularity through his appearances in Keystone Studios films. He soon introduced and adopted the Tramp as his screen persona. He directed his own films and continued to hone his craft as he moved to Essanay Studios, where the Tramp persona was developed emotionally in The Tramp (1915). He then attracted a large fanbase and demanded more money as he moved to Mutual and First National corporations. By 1918, he was one of the world's best-paid and best-known figures.

In 1919, Chaplin co-founded the distribution company United Artists, which gave him complete control over his films. His first feature-length film was The Kid (1921), followed by A Woman of Paris (1923), The Gold Rush (1925), and The Circus (1928). He initially refused to move to sound films in the 1930s, instead producing City Lights (1931) and Modern Times (1936) without dialogue. His first sound film was The Great Dictator (1940), which satirised Adolf Hitler.

The 1940s were marked with controversy for Chaplin, and his popularity declined rapidly. He was accused of communist sympathies, and some members of the press and public were scandalised by his involvement in a paternity suit and marriages to much younger women. The Federal Bureau of Investigation opened an investigation, and Chaplin was forced to leave the US in 1952 and settle in Switzerland. He abandoned the Tramp in his later films, which include Monsieur Verdoux (1947), Limelight (1952), A King in New York (1957), and A Countess from Hong Kong (1967).

Chaplin wrote, directed, produced, edited, and composed the music for most of his films. He was a perfectionist, and his financial independence enabled him to spend years on the development and production of a picture. His films are characterised by slapstick combined with pathos, typified in the Tramp's struggles against adversity. Many contain social and political themes, as well as autobiographical elements. He received an Honorary Academy Award for "the incalculable effect he has had in making motion pictures the art form of this century" in 1972, as part of a renewed appreciation for his work. He continues to be held in high regard, with The Gold Rush, The Circus, City Lights, Modern Times, and The Great Dictator often ranked on lists of the greatest films.

== Life and career ==
=== 1889–1913: early years ===
==== Background and childhood hardship ====
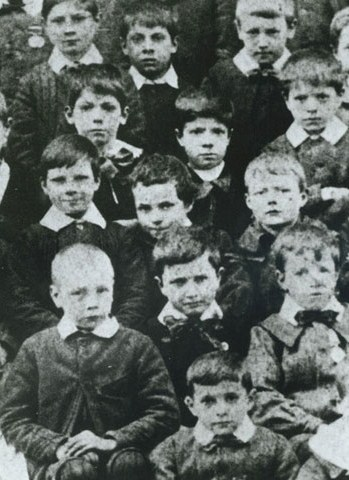
Seven-year-old Chaplin (centre, head slightly cocked) at the Central London District School for paupers, 1897

Charles Spencer Chaplin Jr. was born on 16 April 1889 in London, to Hannah Chaplin (née Hill) and Charles Chaplin Sr. It has been speculated that his paternal grandmother came from the Romani people, although "Without a birth certificate, no one will ever know the truth." There is no official record of his birth, although Chaplin believed he was born at East Street, Walworth, in South London. (Note: An MI5 investigation in 1952 was unable to find any record of Chaplin's birth. Chaplin biographer David Robinson notes that it is not surprising that his parents failed to register the birth: "It was easy enough, particularly for music hall artists, constantly moving (if they were lucky) from one town to another, to put off and eventually forget this kind of formality; at that time the penalties were not strict or efficiently enforced." In 2011 a letter sent to Chaplin in the 1970s came to light which claimed that he had been born in a Gypsy caravan at Black Patch Park in Smethwick, Staffordshire (now in the borough of Sandwell in the West Midlands). Chaplin's son, Michael, has suggested that the information must have been significant to his father for him to retain the letter. Regarding the date of his birth, Chaplin believed it to be 16 April, but an announcement in the edition of 11 May 1889 of The Magnet and The Era stated it as the 15th.)

His parents had married four years earlier, at which time Charles Sr. became the legal guardian of Hannah's first son, Sydney John Hill. (Note: Sydney was born when Hannah Chaplin was 19. The identity of his biological father is not known for sure, but Hannah claimed it was a Mr. Hawkes.) At the time of Chaplin's birth, both parents were music-hall entertainers. Hannah, the daughter of a shoemaker, had a brief and unsuccessful career under the stage name "Lily Harley", while Charles Sr., a butcher's son, was a popular singer. Although they never divorced, Chaplin's parents were estranged by around 1891. The following year, Hannah gave birth to a third son, George Wheeler Dryden, fathered by the music-hall entertainer Leo Dryden. The child was taken by Dryden at six months old and did not re-enter Chaplin's life for about three decades.

"I was hardly aware of a crisis because we lived in a continual crisis; and, being a boy, I dismissed our troubles with gracious forgetfulness."

— Chaplin, on his childhood

Chaplin's childhood was marked by poverty and hardship, making his later rise, according to his authorised biographer David Robinson, "the most dramatic of all the rags to riches stories ever told". Chaplin's early years were spent with his mother and brother Sydney in the London district of Kennington. Hannah had no means of income other than occasional nursing and dressmaking, and Chaplin Sr. provided no financial support. As the situation deteriorated, Chaplin was sent to Lambeth Workhouse when he was seven years old. (Note: Hannah became ill in May 1896, and was admitted to hospital. Southwark Council ruled that it was necessary to send the children to a workhouse "owing to the absence of their father and the destitution and illness of their mother".) The council housed him at the Central London District School for paupers, which he later remembered as "a forlorn existence". He was briefly reunited with his mother 18 months later, but Hannah was forced to readmit her family to the workhouse in July 1898. The boys were promptly sent to Norwood Schools, another institution for destitute children.

In September 1898, Hannah was committed to Cane Hill, a mental asylum in Coulsdon, Surrey; she had developed psychosis seemingly brought on by an infection of syphilis and malnutrition. During her two-month stay, Chaplin and Sydney were sent to live with their father, whom they scarcely knew. Charles Sr. was by then severely alcoholic, and conditions were poor enough to prompt a visit from the National Society for the Prevention of Cruelty to Children. Charles Sr. died two years later (1900), aged 38, from cirrhosis of the liver.

From 1901 to 1903 Charlie and his mother Hannah lived in an attic at 3 Pownall Street, off Kennington Road, Kennington, south London. Hannah returned to the music hall stage, but her voice failed, and with it her career. She began to see ghosts outside the attic’s window. Charlie, then 14, took her to the infirmary, whence she returned to Cane Hill Asylum in Surrey. Charlie lived alone in the attic for several days, searching for food and occasionally sleeping rough, until his brother Sydney – who had joined the Navy two years earlier – returned.

Hannah was released from Cane Hill Asylum eight months later, in January 1904, but her psychosis recurred in March 1905. "There was nothing we could do but accept poor mother's fate", Chaplin later wrote. She was released from Cane Hill after seven and a half years, in 1912. Charlie later brought her with him to the United States, where she remained in care until her death in 1928.

==== Young performer ====
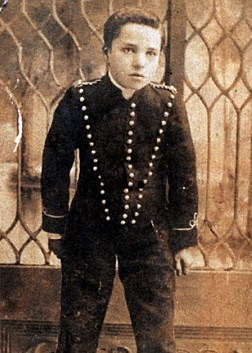
A teenage Chaplin in the play Sherlock Holmes

Between his time in the poor schools and his mother succumbing to mental illness, Chaplin began to perform on stage. He later recalled making his first amateur appearance at the age of five years, when he took over from Hannah one night in Aldershot. (Note: According to Chaplin, Hannah had been booed off stage and the manager chose him – as he was standing in the wings – to go on as her replacement. He remembered confidently entertaining the crowd, and receiving laughter and applause.) This was an isolated occurrence, but by the time he was nine Chaplin had, with his mother's encouragement, grown interested in performing.

He later wrote: "[she] imbued me with the feeling that I had some sort of talent". Through his father's connections, Chaplin became a member of the Eight Lancashire Lads clog-dancing troupe, with whom he toured English music halls throughout 1899 and 1900. (Note: The Eight Lancashire Lads were still touring until 1908; the exact time Chaplin left the group is unverified, but based on research, A. J. Marriot believes it was in December 1900.) Chaplin worked hard, and the act was popular with audiences, but he was not satisfied with dancing and wished to form a comedy act.

In the years Chaplin was touring with the Eight Lancashire Lads, his mother ensured that he still attended school but, by the age of 13, he had abandoned education. He supported himself with a range of jobs, while nursing his ambition to become an actor. At 14, shortly after his mother's relapse, he registered with a theatrical agency in London's West End. The manager sensed potential in Chaplin, who was promptly given his first role as a newsboy in Harry Arthur Saintsbury's Jim, a Romance of Cockayne. It opened in July 1903, but the show was unsuccessful and closed after two weeks. Chaplin's comic performance, however, was singled out for praise in many of the reviews.

Saintsbury secured a role for Chaplin in Charles Frohman's production of Sherlock Holmes, where he played Billy the pageboy in three nationwide tours. His performance was so well received that he was called to London to play the role alongside William Gillette, the original Holmes. (Note: William Gillette co-wrote the Sherlock Holmes play with Arthur Conan Doyle, and had been starring in it since its New York opening in 1899. He had come to London in 1905 to appear in a new play, Clarice. Its reception was poor, and Gillette decided to add an "after-piece" called The Painful Predicament of Sherlock Holmes. This short play was what Chaplin originally came to London to appear in. After three nights, Gillette chose to close Clarice and replace it with Sherlock Holmes. Chaplin had so pleased Gillette with his performance in The Painful Predicament that he was kept on as Billy for the full play.) "It was like tidings from heaven", Chaplin recalled. At 16 years old, Chaplin starred in the play's West End production at the Duke of York's Theatre from October to December 1905. He completed one final tour of Sherlock Holmes in early 1906, before leaving the play after more than two-and-a-half years.

==== Stage comedy and vaudeville ====
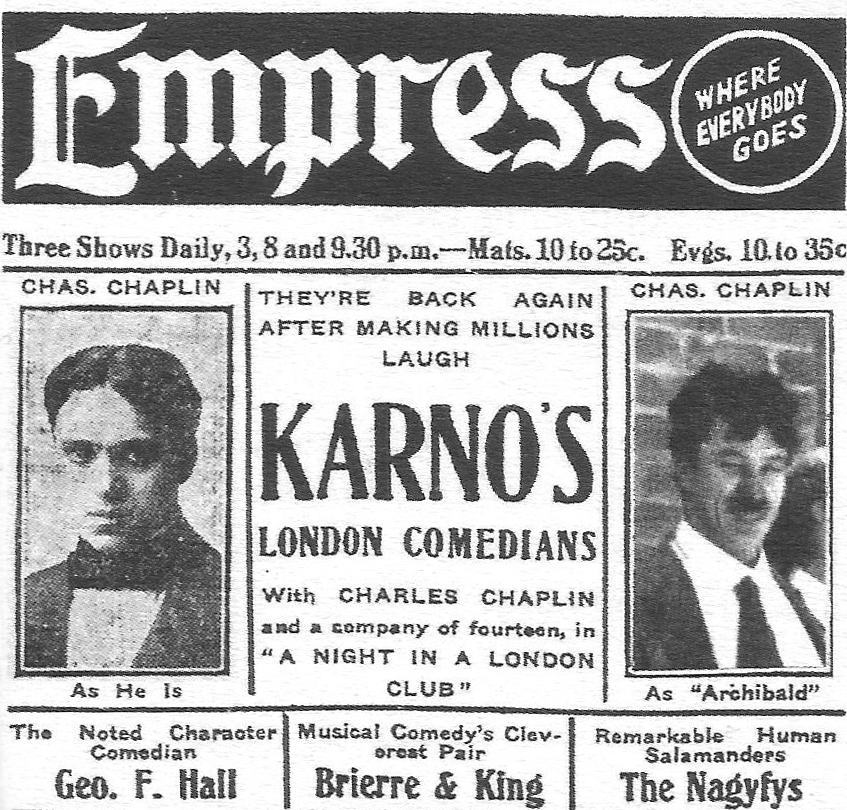
Advertisement from Chaplin's American tour with the Fred Karno comedy company, 1913

Chaplin soon found work with a new company and went on tour with his brother, who was also pursuing an acting career, in a comedy sketch called Repairs. In May 1906, Chaplin joined the juvenile act Casey's Circus, where he developed popular burlesque pieces and was soon the star of the show. By the time the act finished touring in July 1907, the 18-year-old had become an accomplished comedic performer. He struggled to find more work, however, and a brief attempt at a solo act was a failure. (Note: Chaplin attempted to be a "Jewish comedian", but the act was poorly received and he performed it only once.)

Meanwhile, Sydney Chaplin had joined Fred Karno's prestigious comedy company in 1906 and, by 1908, he was one of their key performers. In February, he managed to secure a two-week trial for his younger brother. Karno was initially wary, and considered Chaplin a "pale, puny, sullen-looking youngster" who "looked much too shy to do any good in the theatre". However, the teenager made an impact on his first night at the London Coliseum and he was quickly signed to a contract. Chaplin began by playing a series of minor parts, eventually progressing to starring roles in 1909. In April 1910, he was given the lead in a new sketch, Jimmy the Fearless. It was a big success, and Chaplin received considerable press attention.

Karno selected his new star to join the section of the company that toured North America's vaudeville circuit, a section which also included Stan Laurel. The young comedian headed the show and impressed reviewers, being described as "one of the best pantomime artists ever seen here". His most successful role was a drunk called the "Inebriate Swell", which drew him significant recognition. The role was in the play titled Mumming Birds, known as A Night in an English Music Hall when Chaplin performed it on tour, which was the longest-running sketch the music halls produced, and included throwing pies at the players among other innovations. The tour lasted 21 months, and the troupe returned to England in June 1912. Chaplin recalled that he "had a disquieting feeling of sinking back into a depressing commonplaceness" and was, therefore, delighted when a new tour began in October.

=== 1914–1917: entering films ===
==== Keystone ====
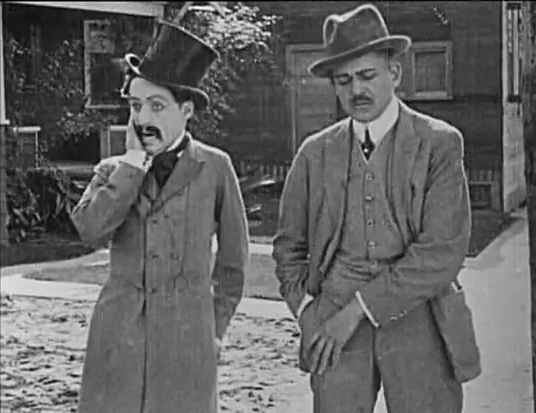
Chaplin (left) in his first film appearance, Making a Living, with Henry Lehrman, who directed the picture (1914)

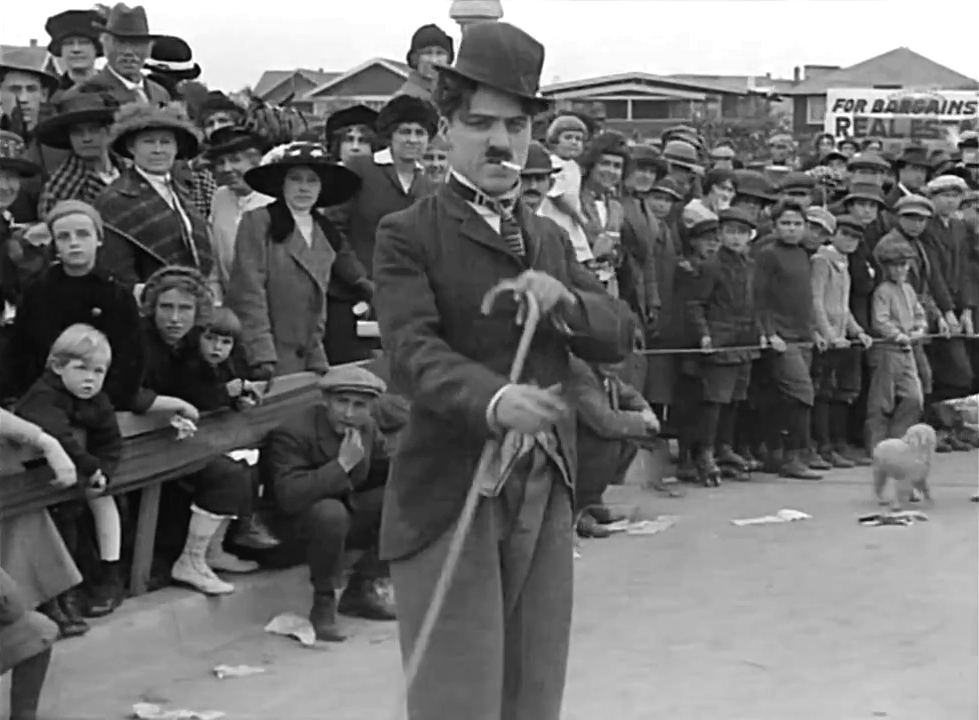
Chaplin's trademark character "the Tramp" debuts in Kid Auto Races at Venice (1914), Chaplin's second released film

Six months into the second American tour, Chaplin was invited to join the New York Motion Picture Company. A representative who had seen his performances thought he could replace Fred Mace, a star of their Keystone Studios who intended to leave. Chaplin thought the Keystone comedies "a crude mélange of rough and rumble", but liked the idea of working in films and rationalised: "Besides, it would mean a new life." He met with the company and signed a $150-per-week (Note: $4,900 in 2025 dollars) contract in September 1913. Chaplin arrived in Los Angeles in early December, and began working for the Keystone studio on 5 January 1914. Film critic Pauline Kael notes that the early two-reelers were lewd and full of bathroom humour and drunkenness.

Chaplin's boss was Mack Sennett, who initially expressed concern that the 24-year-old looked too young. He was not used in a picture until late January, during which time Chaplin attempted to learn the processes of filmmaking. The one-reeler Making a Living marked his film acting debut and was released on 2 February 1914. Chaplin strongly disliked the picture, but one review picked him out as "a comedian of the first water". For his second appearance in front of the camera, Chaplin selected the costume with which he became identified. He described the process in his autobiography:

I wanted everything to be a contradiction: the pants baggy, the coat tight, the hat small and the shoes large ... I added a small moustache, which, I reasoned, would add age without hiding my expression. I had no idea of the character. But the moment I was dressed, the clothes and the makeup made me feel the person he was. I began to know him, and by the time I walked on stage he was fully born. (Note: Robinson notes that this was not strictly true: "The character was to take a year or more to evolve its full dimensions and even then – which was its particular strength – it would evolve during the whole rest of his career.")

The film was Mabel's Strange Predicament, but "the Tramp" character, as it became known, debuted to audiences in Kid Auto Races at Venice – shot later than Mabel's Strange Predicament but released two days earlier on 7 February 1914. His interest in tramps came from various sources, with Chaplin crediting the hobo comic strip, "Weary Willie and Tired Tim", from the London comic magazine Illustrated Chips, as a childhood influence.

Chaplin adopted the Tramp as his screen persona and attempted to make suggestions for the films he appeared in. These ideas were dismissed by his directors. During the filming of his 11th picture, Mabel at the Wheel, he clashed with director Mabel Normand and was almost released from his contract. Sennett kept him on, however, when he received orders from exhibitors for more Chaplin films. Sennett also allowed Chaplin to direct his next film himself after Chaplin promised to pay $1,500 ($49,000 in 2025 dollars) if the film was unsuccessful.

Caught in the Rain, issued on 4 May 1914, was Chaplin's directorial debut and was highly successful. Thereafter he directed almost every short film in which he appeared for Keystone, at the rate of approximately one per week, a period which he later remembered as the most exciting time of his career. Chaplin's films introduced a slower form of comedy than the typical Keystone farce, and he developed a large fan base. In November 1914, he had a supporting role in the first feature length comedy film, Tillie's Punctured Romance, directed by Sennett and starring Marie Dressler, which was a commercial success and increased his popularity. When Chaplin's contract came up for renewal at the end of the year, he asked for $1,000 a week, (Note: equivalent to $33,000 in 2025) an amount Sennett refused, as he thought it was too large.

==== Essanay ====
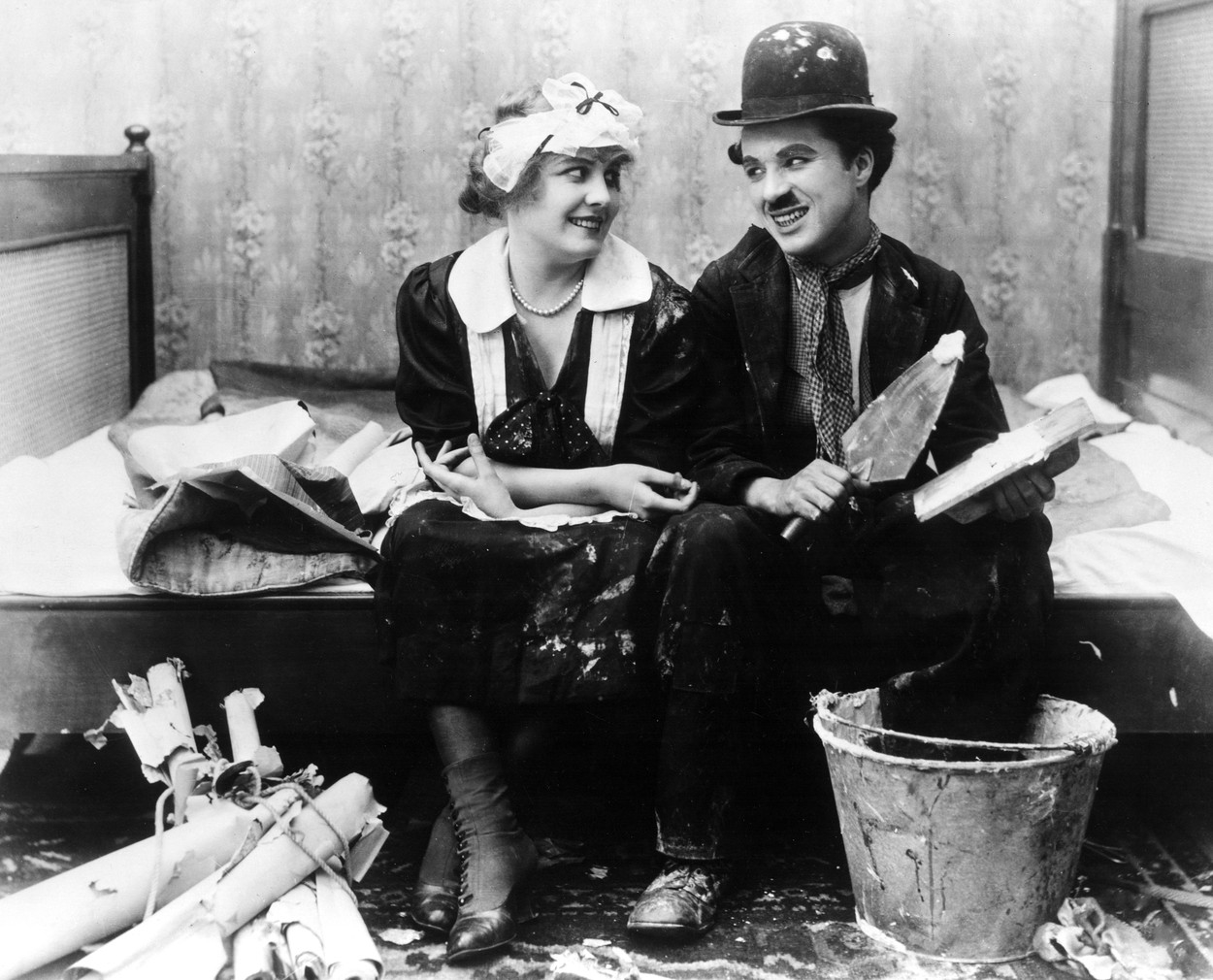
Chaplin and Edna Purviance, his regular leading lady, in Work (1915)

The Essanay Film Manufacturing Company of Chicago sent Chaplin an offer of $1,250 (Note: equivalent to $40,000 in 2025) a week, with a signing bonus of $10,000. (Note: equivalent to $321,000 in 2025) He joined the studio in late December 1914, where he began forming a stock company of regular players, actors he worked with again and again, including Ben Turpin, Leo White, Bud Jamison, Paddy McGuire, Fred Goodwins and Billy Armstrong. Chaplin soon recruited a leading lady, Edna Purviance, whom he met in a café and hired on account of her beauty. She went on to appear in 35 films with him over eight years; the pair also formed a romantic relationship that lasted until 1917.

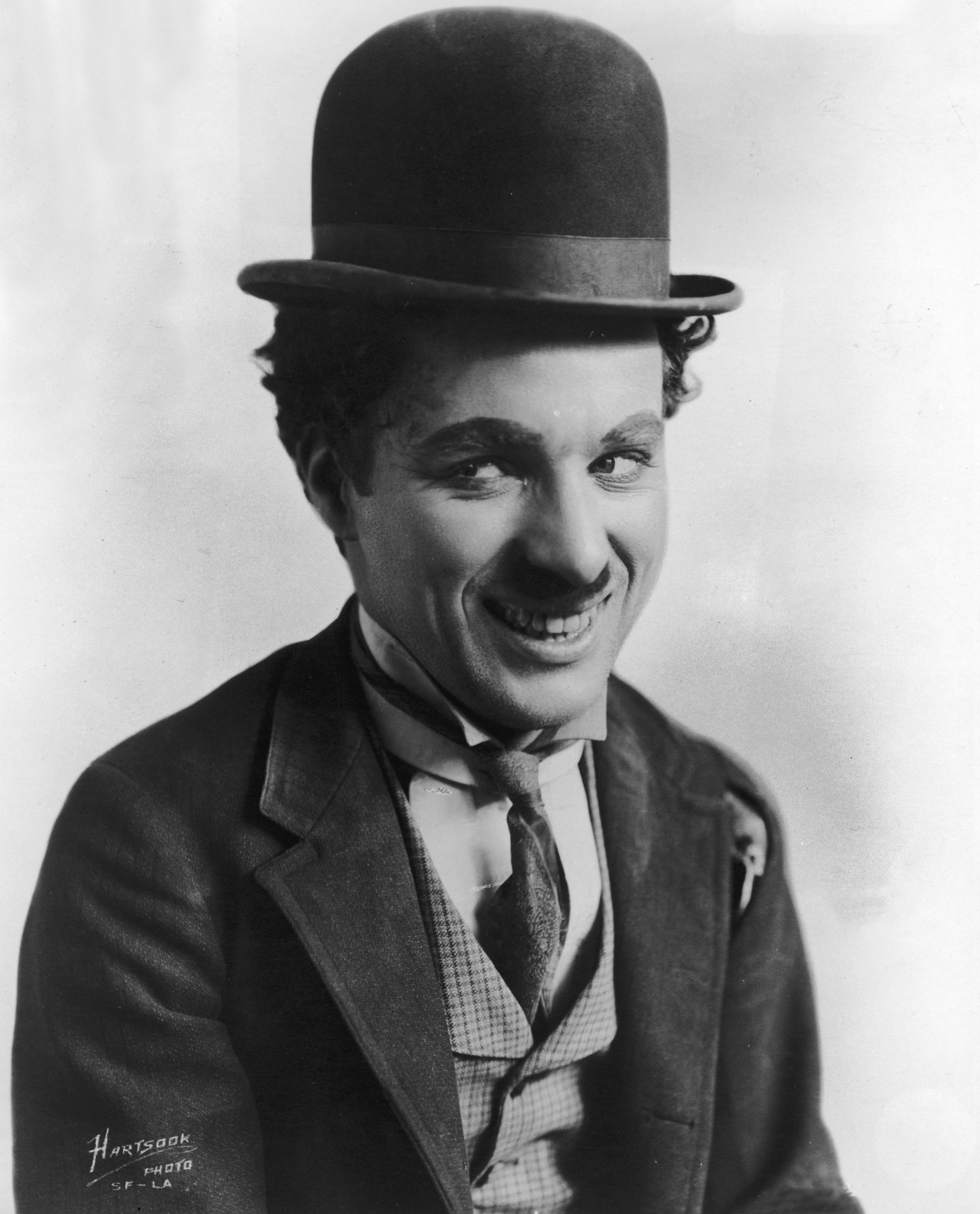
Chaplin in costume as The Tramp

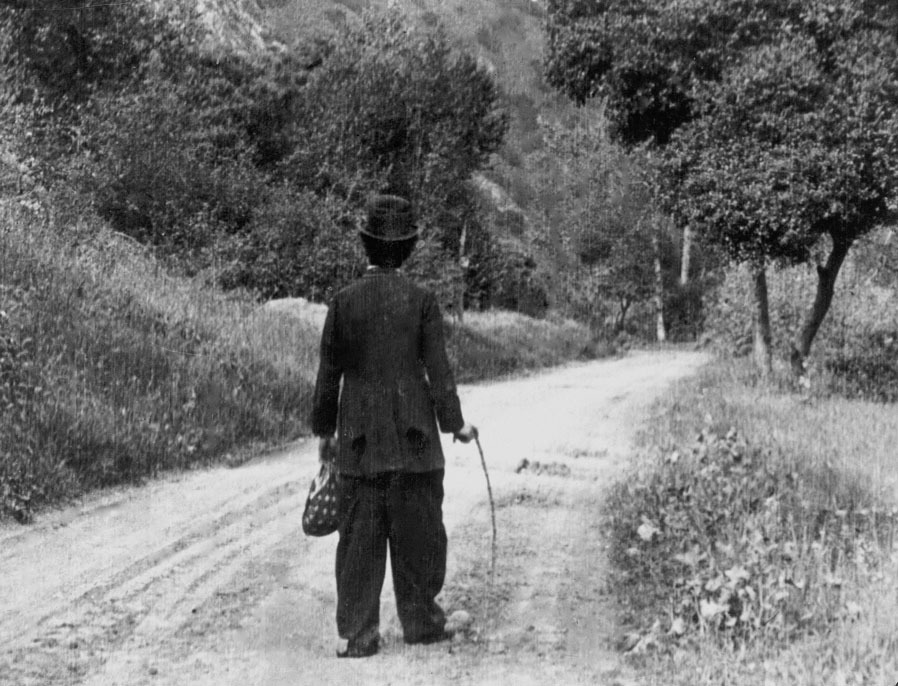
Charlie Chaplin (1915) walking down the road dejectedly, in the famous last scene of The Tramp, filmed on location in Niles Canyon, California

Chaplin asserted a high level of control over his pictures and started to put more time and care into each film. There was a month-long interval between the release of his second production, A Night Out, and his third, The Champion. The final seven of Chaplin's 14 Essanay films were all produced at this slower pace. Chaplin also began to alter his screen persona, which had attracted some criticism at Keystone for its "mean, crude, and brutish" nature. The character became more gentle and romantic; The Tramp (April 1915) was considered a particular turning point in his development. The use of pathos was developed further with The Bank, in which Chaplin created a sad ending. Robinson notes that this was an innovation in comedy films, and marked the time when serious critics began to appreciate Chaplin's work. At Essanay, writes film scholar Simon Louvish, Chaplin "found the themes and the settings that would define the Tramp's world".

During 1915, Chaplin became a cultural phenomenon. Shops were stocked with Chaplin merchandise, he was featured in cartoons and comic strips, and several songs were written about him. In July, a journalist for Motion Picture wrote that "Chaplinitis" had spread across America. As his fame grew worldwide, he became the film industry's first international star. In September 1915, Chaplin topped a poll held by Pictures and the Picturegoer of the greatest British film actors, receiving 142,920 votes from readers. The classic music hall sketch, A Night in an English Music Hall, would be the basis for his 12th Essanay film, A Night in the Show, released in November 1915. When the Essanay contract ended in December 1915, (Note: After leaving Essanay, Chaplin found himself engaged in a legal battle with the company that lasted until 1922. It began when Essanay extended his last film for them, Burlesque on Carmen, from a two-reeler to a feature film (by adding out-takes and new scenes with Leo White) without his consent. Chaplin applied for an injunction to prevent its distribution, but the case was dismissed in court. In a counter-claim, Essanay alleged that Chaplin had broken his contract by not producing the agreed number of films and sued him for $500,000 in damages. In addition, the company compiled another film, Triple Trouble (1918), from various unused Chaplin scenes and new material shot by White.) Chaplin, fully aware of his popularity, requested a $150,000 (Note: equivalent to $3,210,000 in 2025) signing bonus from his next studio. He received several offers, including Universal, Fox and Vitagraph, the best of which came from the Mutual Film Corporation at $10,000 (Note: equivalent to $214,000 in 2025) a week.

==== Mutual ====
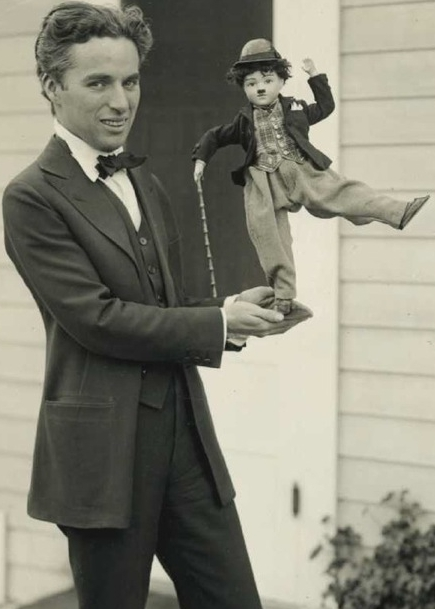
By 1916, Chaplin was a global phenomenon. Here he shows off some of his merchandise, c. 1918.

Chaplin and Mutual negotiated a contract that paid him $670,000 per year (equivalent to $19,800,000 in 2025), which made the 26-year-old Chaplin one of the highest-paid people in the world. The high salary shocked the public and was widely reported in the press. John R. Freuler, the studio president, explained: "We can afford to pay Mr. Chaplin this large sum annually because the public wants Chaplin and will pay for him."

Mutual gave Chaplin his own Los Angeles studio to work in, which opened in March 1916. He added two key members to his stock company, Albert Austin and Eric Campbell, and produced a series of elaborate two-reelers: The Floorwalker, The Fireman, The Vagabond, One A.M. and The Count. For The Pawnshop, he recruited the actor Henry Bergman, who was to work with Chaplin for 30 years. Behind the Screen and The Rink completed Chaplin's releases for 1916. The Mutual contract stipulated that he release a two-reel film every four weeks, which he had managed to achieve. With the new year, however, Chaplin began to demand more time. In 1917, he made four more films for Mutual: Easy Street, The Cure, The Immigrant and The Adventurer. With their careful construction, these films are considered by Chaplin scholars to be among his finest work. Later in life, Chaplin referred to his Mutual years as the happiest period of his career. However, Chaplin also felt that those films became increasingly formulaic over the period of the contract, and he was increasingly dissatisfied with the working conditions encouraging that.

Chaplin was attacked in the British media for not fighting in the First World War. He defended himself, claiming that he would fight for Britain if called and had registered for the American draft, but he was not summoned by either country. (Note: The British embassy made a statement saying: "[Chaplin] is of as much use to Great Britain now making big money and subscribing to war loans as he would be in the trenches.") Despite this criticism, Chaplin was a favourite with the troops, and his popularity continued to grow worldwide. Harper's Weekly reported that the name of Charlie Chaplin was "a part of the common language of almost every country", and that the Tramp image was "universally familiar". In 1917, professional Chaplin imitators were so widespread that he took legal action, with magazine writers complaining that nine out of ten men who attended costume parties did so dressed as the Tramp. The same year, a study by the Boston Society for Psychical Research concluded that Chaplin was "an American obsession". The actress Minnie Maddern Fiske wrote that "a constantly increasing body of cultured, artistic people are beginning to regard the young English buffoon, Charles Chaplin, as an extraordinary artist, as well as a comic genius".

=== 1918–1922: First National ===
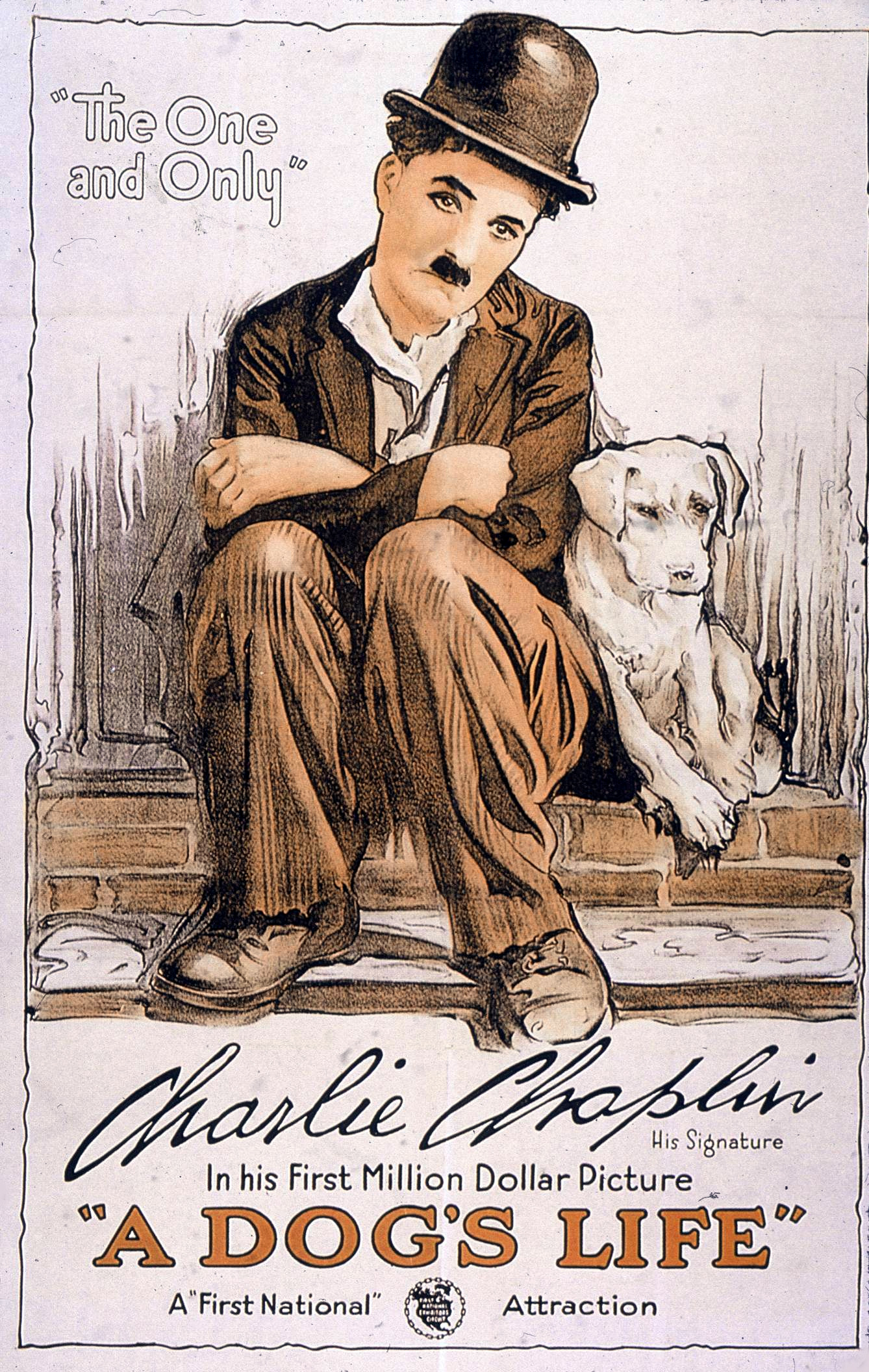
A Dog's Life (1918). It was around this time that Chaplin began to conceive the Tramp as a sad clown.

In January 1918, Chaplin was visited by leading British singer and comedian Harry Lauder, and the two acted in a short film together.

Mutual was patient with Chaplin's decreased rate of output, and the contract ended amicably. With his aforementioned concern about the declining quality of his films because of contract scheduling stipulations, Chaplin's primary concern in finding a new distributor was independence; Sydney Chaplin, then his business manager, told the press: "Charlie [must] be allowed all the time he needs and all the money for producing [films] the way he wants ... It is quality, not quantity, we are after." In June 1917, Chaplin signed to complete eight films for First National Exhibitors' Circuit in return for $1 million. (Note: equivalent to $25,100,000 in 2025) He chose to build his own studio, situated on five acres of land off Sunset Boulevard, with production facilities of the highest order. Charlie Chaplin Studios was completed in January 1918, and Chaplin was given freedom over the making of his pictures.

A Dog's Life, released April 1918, was the first film under the new contract. In it, Chaplin demonstrated his increasing concern with story construction and his treatment of the Tramp as "a sort of Pierrot". The film was described by Louis Delluc as "cinema's first total work of art". Chaplin then embarked on the Third Liberty Bond campaign, touring the United States for one month to raise money for the Allies of the First World War. He also produced a short propaganda film at his own expense, donated to the government for fund-raising, called The Bond. Chaplin's next release was war-based, placing the Tramp in the trenches for Shoulder Arms. Associates warned him against making a comedy about the war but, as he later recalled: "Dangerous or not, the idea excited me." He spent four months filming the picture, which was released in October 1918 with great success.

==== United Artists, Mildred Harris, and The Kid ====
After the release of Shoulder Arms, Chaplin requested more money from First National, which was refused. Frustrated with their lack of concern for quality, and worried about rumours of a possible merger between the company and Famous Players–Lasky, Chaplin joined forces with Douglas Fairbanks, Mary Pickford and D. W. Griffith to form a new distribution company, United Artists. The arrangement was revolutionary in the film industry, as it enabled the four partners – all creative artists – to personally fund their pictures and have complete control. Chaplin was eager to start with the new company and offered to buy out his contract with First National. They refused and insisted that he complete the final six films owed.

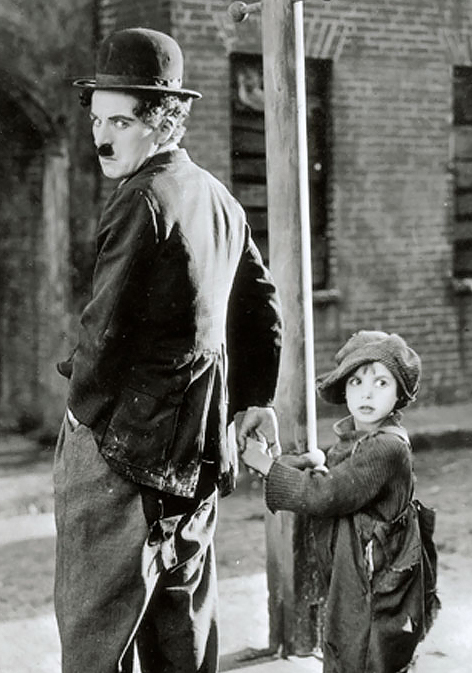
The Kid (1921), with Jackie Coogan, combined comedy with drama and was Chaplin's first film to exceed an hour.

Before the creation of United Artists, Chaplin married for the first time. The 16-year-old actress Mildred Harris had announced that she was pregnant with his child, and in September 1918, he married her quietly in Los Angeles to avoid controversy. Soon after, the pregnancy was found to be false. Chaplin was unhappy with the union and, feeling that marriage stunted his creativity, struggled over the production of his film Sunnyside. Harris was by then legitimately pregnant, and on 7 July 1919, gave birth to a son. Norman Spencer Chaplin was born malformed and died three days later. The marriage ended in April 1920, with Chaplin explaining in his autobiography that they were "irreconcilably mismated".

Losing the child, plus his own childhood experiences, are thought to have influenced Chaplin's next film, which turned the Tramp into the caretaker of a young boy. For this new venture, Chaplin also wished to do more than comedy and, according to Louvish, "make his mark on a changed world". Filming on The Kid began in August 1919, with four-year-old Jackie Coogan his co-star. The Kid was in production for nine months until May 1920 and, at 68 minutes, it was Chaplin's longest picture to date. Dealing with issues of poverty and parent–child separation, The Kid was one of the earliest films to combine comedy and drama. It was released in January 1921 with instant success, and, by 1924, had been screened in over 50 countries.

Chaplin spent five months on his next film, the two-reeler The Idle Class. Work on the picture was for a time delayed by more turmoil in his personal life. First National had on 12 April announced Chaplin's engagement to the actress May Collins, whom he had hired to be his secretary at the studio. By early June, however, Chaplin "suddenly decided he could scarcely stand to be in the same room" as Collins, but instead of breaking off the engagement directly, he "stopped coming in to work, sending word that he was suffering from a bad case of influenza, which May knew to be a lie."

Ultimately work on the film resumed, and following its September 1921 release, Chaplin chose to return to England for the first time in almost a decade. He wrote a book about his journey, titled My Wonderful Visit. He then worked to fulfil his First National contract, releasing Pay Day in February 1922. The Pilgrim, his final short film, was delayed by distribution disagreements with the studio and released a year later.

=== 1923–1938: silent features ===
==== A Woman of Paris and The Gold Rush ====
Having fulfilled his First National contract, Chaplin was free to make his first picture as an independent producer. In November 1922, he began filming A Woman of Paris, a romantic drama about ill-fated lovers. Chaplin intended it to be a star-making vehicle for Edna Purviance, and did not appear in the picture himself other than in a brief, uncredited cameo. He wished the film to have a realistic feel and directed his cast to give restrained performances. In real life, he explained, "men and women try to hide their emotions rather than seek to express them". A Woman of Paris premiered in September 1923 and was acclaimed for its innovative, subtle approach. The public, however, seemed to have little interest in a Chaplin film without Chaplin, and it was a box office disappointment. The filmmaker was hurt by this failure – he had long wanted to produce a dramatic film and was proud of the result – and soon withdrew A Woman of Paris from circulation.

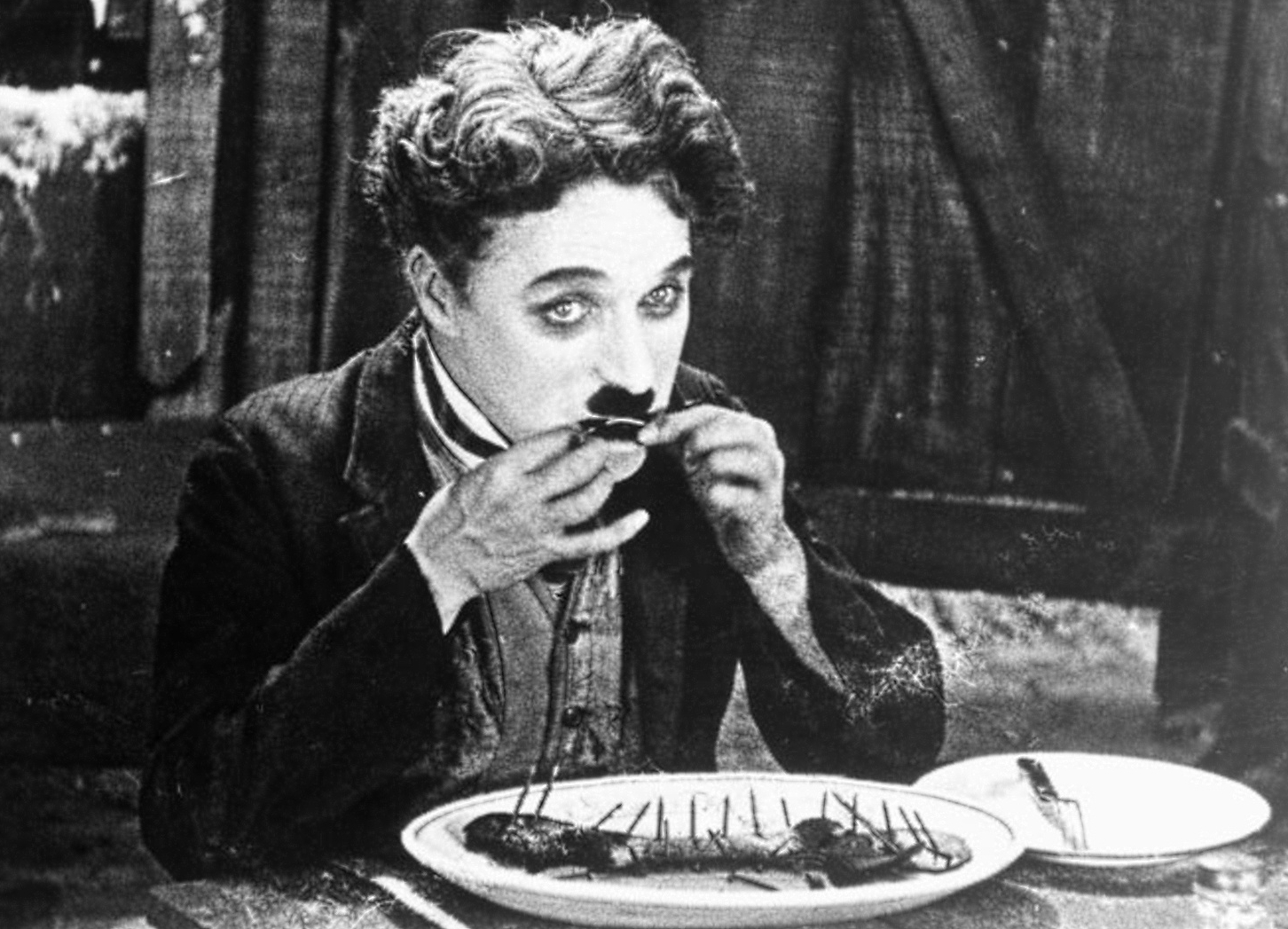
The Tramp resorts to eating his boot in The Gold Rush (1925).

Chaplin returned to comedy for his next project. Setting his standards high, he told himself "This next film must be an epic! The Greatest!" Inspired by a photograph of the 1898 Klondike Gold Rush, and later the story of the Donner Party of 1846–1847, he made what Geoffrey Macnab calls "an epic comedy out of grim subject matter". In The Gold Rush, the Tramp is a lonely prospector fighting adversity and looking for love. With Georgia Hale as his leading lady, Chaplin began filming the picture in February 1924. Its elaborate production, costing almost $1 million, included location shooting in the Truckee mountains in Nevada with 600 extras, extravagant sets, and special effects. The last scene was shot in May 1925 after 15 months of filming.

Chaplin felt The Gold Rush was the best film he had made. It opened in August 1925 and became one of the highest-grossing films of the silent era, with a U.S. box-office of $5 million. (Note: equivalent to $91,800,000 in 2025) The comedy contains some of Chaplin's most famous sequences, such as the Tramp eating his shoe and the "Dance of the Rolls". Macnab has called it "the quintessential Chaplin film". Chaplin stated at its release: "This is the picture that I want to be remembered by".

==== Lita Grey and The Circus ====
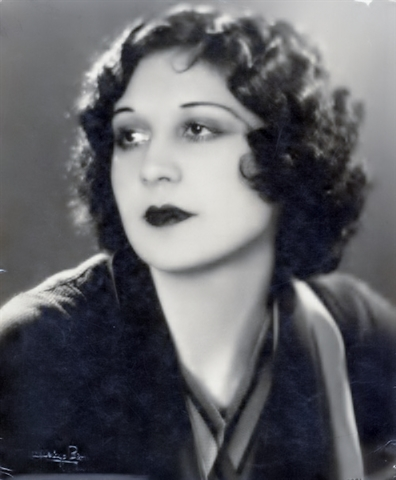
Lita Grey, whose bitter divorce from Chaplin caused a scandal

While making The Gold Rush, Chaplin married for the second time. Mirroring the circumstances of his first union, Lita Grey was a teenage actress, originally set to star in the film, whose surprise announcement of pregnancy forced Chaplin into marriage. She was 16 and he was 35, meaning Chaplin could have been charged with statutory rape under California law. He therefore arranged a discreet marriage in Mexico on 25 November 1924. They originally met during her childhood and she had previously appeared in his works The Kid and The Idle Class. Their first son, Charles Spencer Chaplin III, was born on 5 May 1925, followed by Sydney Earl Chaplin on 30 March 1926. On 6 July 1925, Chaplin became the first movie star to be featured on a Time cover.

It was an unhappy marriage, and Chaplin spent long hours at the studio to avoid seeing his wife. In November 1926, Grey took the children and left the family home. A bitter divorce followed, in which Grey's application – accusing Chaplin of infidelity, abuse and of harbouring "perverted sexual desires" – was leaked to the press. (Note: In her memoirs, Lita Grey later claimed that many of her complaints were "cleverly, shockingly enlarged upon or distorted" by her lawyers.) Chaplin was reported to be in a state of nervous breakdown, as the story became headline news and groups formed across America calling for his films to be banned. Eager to end the case without further scandal, Chaplin's lawyers agreed to a cash settlement of $600,000 (Note: equivalent to $11,120,000 in 2025) – the largest awarded by American courts at that time. His fan base was strong enough to survive the incident, and it was soon forgotten, but Chaplin was deeply affected by it. Less than five months after the divorce, Grey's former butler Don Solovich was murdered in Utah, and articles speculated about connections between Chaplin and the murder.

Before the divorce suit was filed, Chaplin had begun work on a new film, The Circus. He built a story around the idea of walking a tightrope while besieged by monkeys, and turned the Tramp into the accidental star of a circus. Filming was suspended for ten months while he dealt with the divorce scandal, and it was generally a trouble-ridden production. Finally completed in October 1927, The Circus was released in January 1928 to a positive reception. At the 1st Academy Awards, Chaplin was given a special trophy "For versatility and genius in acting, writing, directing and producing The Circus". Despite its success, he permanently associated the film with the stress of its production; Chaplin omitted The Circus from his autobiography, and struggled to work on it when he recorded the score in his later years.

==== City Lights ====
I was determined to continue making silent films ... I was a pantomimist and in that medium I was unique and, without false modesty, a master.

— Charlie Chaplin, explaining his defiance against sound in the 1930s

By the time The Circus was released, Hollywood had witnessed the introduction of sound films. Chaplin was cynical about this new medium and the technical shortcomings it presented, believing that "talkies" lacked the artistry of silent films. He was also hesitant to change the formula that had brought him such success, and feared that giving the Tramp a voice would limit his international appeal. He, therefore, rejected the new Hollywood craze and began work on a new silent film. Chaplin was nonetheless anxious about this decision and remained so throughout the film's production.

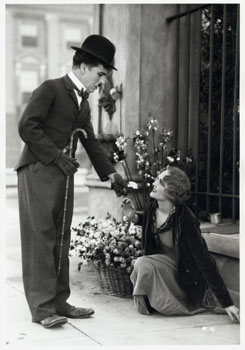
City Lights (1931) is regarded as one of Chaplin's finest works.

When filming began at the end of 1928, Chaplin had been working on the story for almost a year. City Lights followed the Tramp's love for a blind flower girl (played by Virginia Cherrill) and his efforts to raise money for her sight-saving operation. It was a challenging production that lasted 21 months, with Chaplin later confessing that he "had worked himself into a neurotic state of wanting perfection". One advantage Chaplin found in sound technology was the opportunity to record a musical score for the film, which he composed himself.

Chaplin finished editing City Lights in December 1930, by which time silent films were an anachronism. A preview before an unsuspecting public audience was not a success, but a showing for the press produced positive reviews. One journalist wrote: "Nobody in the world but Charlie Chaplin could have done it. He is the only person that has that peculiar something called 'audience appeal' in sufficient quality to defy the popular penchant for movies that talk." Given its general release in January 1931, City Lights proved to be a popular and financial success, eventually grossing over $3 million. (Note: equivalent to $63,500,000 in 2025) The British Film Institute called it Chaplin's finest accomplishment, and the critic James Agee hails the closing scene as "the greatest piece of acting and the highest moment in movies". City Lights became Chaplin's personal favourite of his films and remained so throughout his life.

==== Travels, Paulette Goddard and Modern Times ====
City Lights had been a success, but Chaplin was unsure if he could make another picture without dialogue. He remained convinced that sound would not be compatible with his films, but was also "obsessed by a depressing fear of being old-fashioned". In this state of uncertainty, early in 1931, the comedian decided to take a holiday and ended up travelling for 16 months. (Note: Chaplin left the United States on 31 January 1931, and returned on 10 June 1932.) He spent months travelling Western Europe, including extended stays in France and Switzerland, and spontaneously decided to visit Japan.

The day after he arrived in Japan, Prime Minister Inukai Tsuyoshi was assassinated by ultra-nationalists in the May 15 Incident. The group's original plan had been to provoke a war with the United States by assassinating Chaplin at a welcome reception organised by the prime minister, but the plan had been foiled due to delayed public announcement of the event's date.

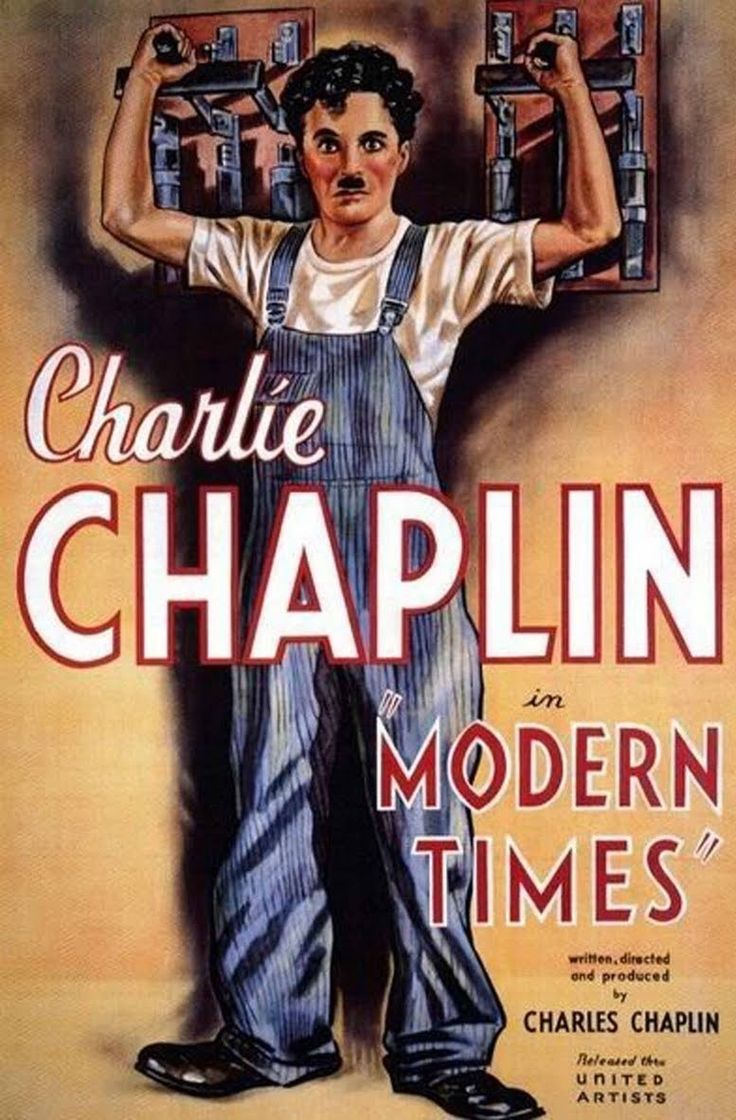
Modern Times (1936), described by Jérôme Larcher as a "grim contemplation on the automatisation of the individual"

In his autobiography, Chaplin recalled that on his return to Los Angeles, "I was confused and without plan, restless and conscious of an extreme loneliness". He briefly considered retiring and moving to China. Chaplin's loneliness was relieved when he met 21-year-old actress Paulette Goddard in July 1932, and the pair began a relationship. He was not ready to commit to a film, however, and focused on writing a serial about his travels (published in Woman's Home Companion).

The trip had been a stimulating experience for Chaplin, including meetings with several prominent thinkers, and he became increasingly interested in world affairs. The state of labour in America troubled him, and he feared that capitalism and machinery in the workplace would increase unemployment levels. It was these concerns that stimulated Chaplin to develop his new film.

Modern Times was announced by Chaplin as "a satire on certain phases of our industrial life". Featuring the Tramp and Goddard as they endure the Great Depression, it took ten and a half months to film. Chaplin intended to use spoken dialogue but changed his mind during rehearsals. Like its predecessor, Modern Times employed sound effects but almost no speaking. Chaplin's performance of a gibberish song did, however, give the Tramp a voice for the only time on film. After recording the music, Chaplin released Modern Times in February 1936. It was his first feature in 15 years to adopt political references and social realism, a factor that attracted considerable press coverage despite Chaplin's attempts to downplay the issue. The film earned less at the box-office than his previous features and received mixed reviews, as some viewers disliked the politicising. Today, Modern Times is seen by the British Film Institute as one of Chaplin's "great features", while David Robinson says it shows the filmmaker at "his unrivalled peak as a creator of visual comedy".

Following the release of Modern Times, Chaplin left with Goddard for a trip to the Far East. Chaplin, Goddard and a Japanese servant named Yonnemori arrived in Saigon in April 1936, and visited multiple locations in French Indochina. They then visited Phnom Penh to view Angkor Wat, and Da Lat, followed by Huế, arriving in Da Nang where he visited the Marble Mountains and the Henri Parmentier Museum. In Hanoi (the capital city of French Indochina) they visited the popular tourist destination Hạ Long Bay, and the couple then left from Hải Phòng to Hong Kong on board of a ship the Canton. The couple had refused to comment on the nature of their relationship, and it was not known whether they were married or not. Sometime later, Chaplin revealed that they married in Canton during this trip. By 1938, the couple had drifted apart, as both focused heavily on their work, although Goddard was again his leading lady in his next feature film, The Great Dictator. She eventually divorced Chaplin in Mexico in 1942, citing incompatibility and separation for more than a year.

=== 1939–1952: controversies and fading popularity ===
==== The Great Dictator ====
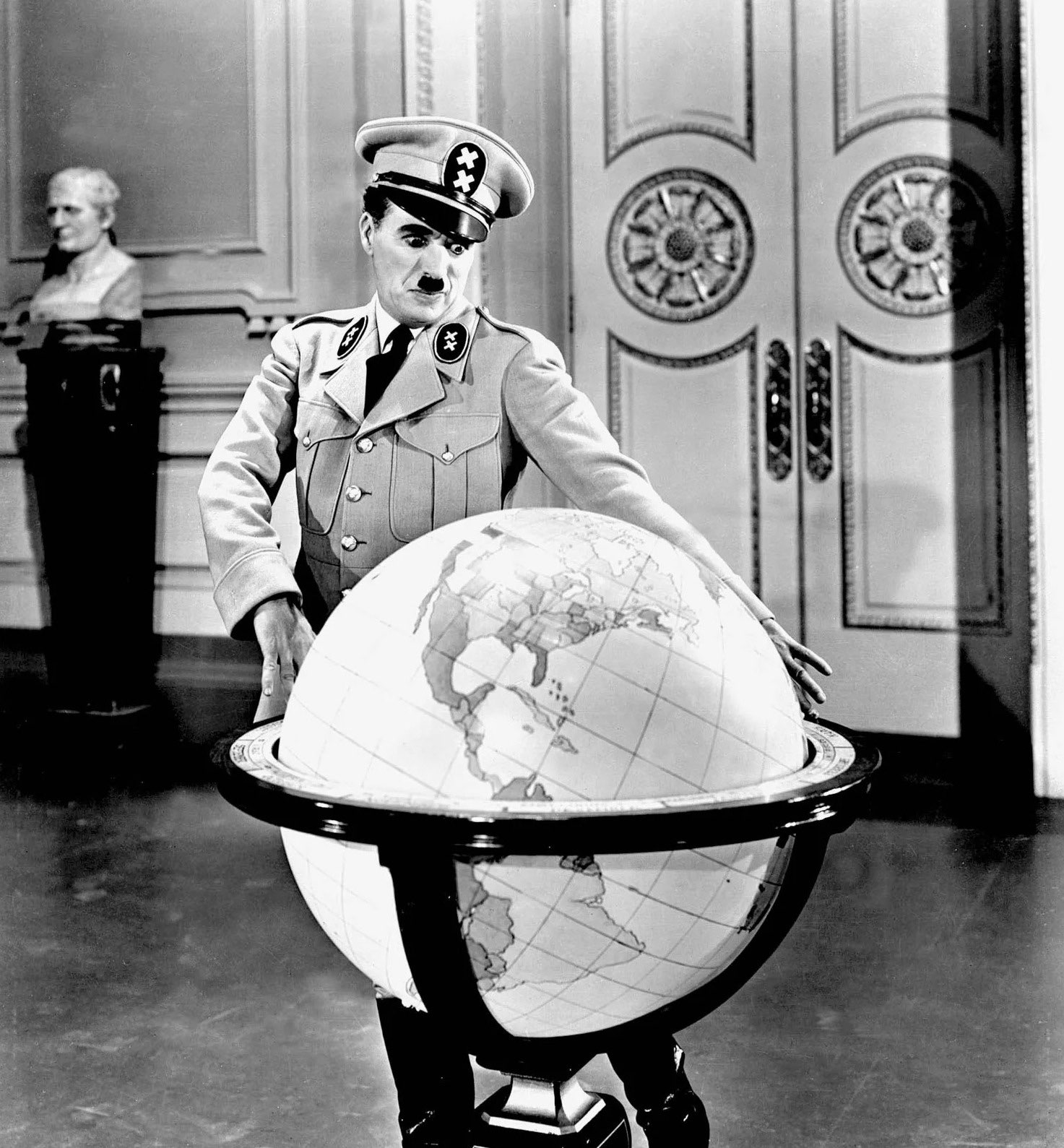
Chaplin satirised Adolf Hitler in The Great Dictator (1940).

The 1940s saw Chaplin face a series of controversies, both in his work and in his personal life, which changed his fortunes and severely affected his popularity in the United States. The first of these was his growing boldness in expressing his political beliefs. Deeply disturbed by the surge of militaristic nationalism in 1930s world politics, Chaplin found that he could not keep these issues out of his work. Parallels between himself and Adolf Hitler had been widely noted: the pair were born four days apart, both had risen from poverty to world prominence, and Hitler wore the same moustache style as Chaplin. It was this physical resemblance that supplied the plot for Chaplin's next film, The Great Dictator, which directly satirised Hitler and attacked fascism.

Chaplin spent two years developing the script and began filming in September 1939, six days after Britain declared war on Germany. He had submitted to using spoken dialogue, partly out of acceptance that he had no other choice, but also because he recognised it as a better method for delivering a political message. Making a comedy about Hitler was seen as highly controversial, but Chaplin's financial independence allowed him to take the risk. "I was determined to go ahead", he later wrote, "for Hitler must be laughed at." (Note: Chaplin later said that if he had known the extent of the Nazi Party's actions he would not have made the film; "Had I known the actual horrors of the German concentration camps, I could not have made The Great Dictator; I could not have made fun of the homicidal insanity of the Nazis.") Chaplin replaced the Tramp (while wearing similar attire) with "A Jewish Barber", a reference to the Nazi Party's belief that he was Jewish. (Note: Speculation about Chaplin's racial origin existed from the earliest days of his fame, and it was often reported that he was a Jew. Research has uncovered no evidence of this, and when a reporter asked in 1915 if it was true, Chaplin responded, "I have not that good fortune." The Nazi Party believed that he was Jewish and banned The Gold Rush on this basis. Chaplin responded by playing a Jew in The Great Dictator and announced, "I did this film for the Jews of the world.") In a dual performance, he also played the dictator "Adenoid Hynkel", a parody of Hitler.

The Great Dictator spent a year in production and was released in October 1940. The film generated a vast amount of publicity, with a critic for The New York Times calling it "the most eagerly awaited picture of the year", and it was one of the biggest money-makers of the era. The ending was unpopular, however, and generated controversy. Chaplin concluded the film with a five-minute speech in which he abandoned his barber character, looked directly into the camera, and pleaded against war and fascism. Charles J. Maland has identified this overt preaching as triggering a decline in Chaplin's popularity, and writes: "Henceforth, no movie fan would ever be able to separate the dimension of politics from [his] star image". Nevertheless, both Winston Churchill and Franklin D. Roosevelt liked the film, which they saw at private screenings before its release. Roosevelt subsequently invited Chaplin to read the film's final speech over the radio during his January 1941 inauguration, with the speech becoming a "hit" of the celebration. Chaplin was often invited to other patriotic functions to read the speech to audiences during the years of the war. The Great Dictator received five Academy Award nominations, including Best Picture, Best Original Screenplay and Best Actor.

==== Legal troubles and Oona O'Neill ====
In the mid-1940s, Chaplin was involved in a series of trials that occupied most of his time and significantly affected his public image. The troubles stemmed from his affair with an aspiring actress named Joan Barry, with whom he was involved intermittently between June 1941 and the autumn of 1942. Barry, who displayed obsessive behaviour and was twice arrested after they separated, (Note: In December 1942, Barry broke into Chaplin's home with a handgun and threatened suicide while holding him at gunpoint. This lasted until the next morning, when Chaplin was able to get the gun from her. Barry broke into Chaplin's home a second time later that month, and he had her arrested. She was then prosecuted for vagrancy in January 1943 – Barry had been unable to pay her hotel bills, and was found wandering the streets of Beverly Hills after taking an overdose of barbiturates.) reappeared the following year and announced that she was pregnant with Chaplin's child. As Chaplin denied the claim, Barry filed a paternity suit against him.

The director of the Federal Bureau of Investigation (FBI), J. Edgar Hoover, who had long been suspicious of Chaplin's political leanings, used the opportunity to generate negative publicity about him. As part of a smear campaign to damage Chaplin's image, the FBI named him in four indictments related to the Barry case. Most serious of these was an alleged violation of the Mann Act, which prohibits the transportation of women across state boundaries for sexual purposes. (Note: According to the prosecutor, Chaplin had violated the act when he paid for Barry's trip to New York in October 1942, when he was also visiting the city. Both Chaplin and Barry agreed that they had met there briefly, and according to Barry, they had sexual intercourse. Chaplin claimed that the last time he was intimate with Barry was May 1942.) Historian Otto Friedrich called this an "absurd prosecution" of an "ancient statute", yet if Chaplin was found guilty, he faced 23 years in prison. Three charges lacked sufficient evidence to proceed to court, but the Mann Act trial began on 21 March 1944. Chaplin was acquitted two weeks later, on 4 April. The case was frequently headline news, with Newsweek calling it the "biggest public relations scandal since the Fatty Arbuckle murder trial in 1921".

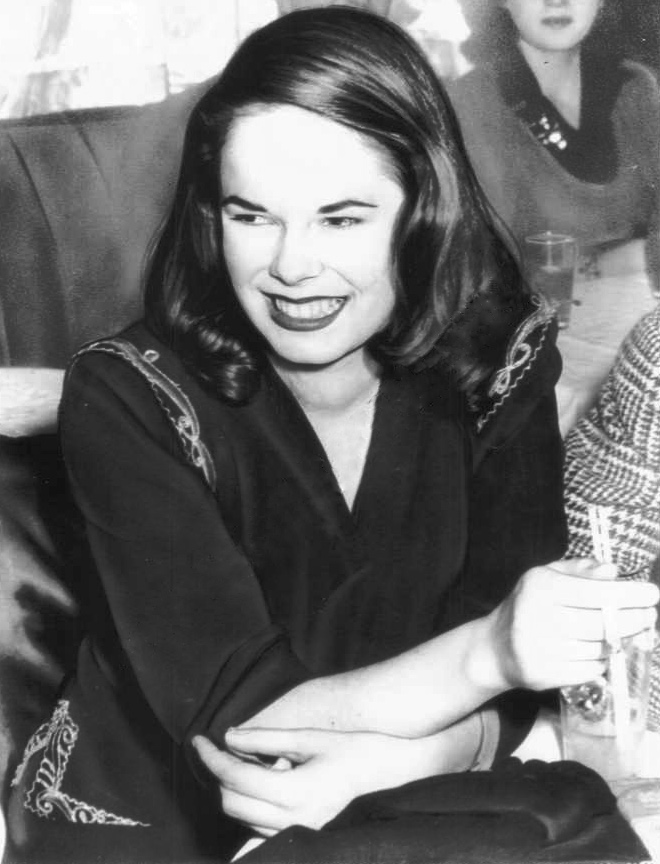
Chaplin's fourth wife and widow, Oona

Barry's child, Carol Ann, was born in October 1943, and the paternity suit went to court in December 1944. After two arduous trials, in which the prosecuting lawyer accused him of "moral turpitude", Chaplin was declared to be the father. Evidence from blood tests that indicated otherwise were not admissible, (Note: Carol Ann's blood group was B, Barry's was A, and Chaplin's was O. In California at this time, blood tests were not accepted as evidence in legal trials.) and the judge ordered Chaplin to pay child support until Carol Ann turned 21. Media coverage of the suit was influenced by the FBI, which fed information to gossip columnist Hedda Hopper, and Chaplin was portrayed in an overwhelmingly critical light.

The controversy surrounding Chaplin increased when – two weeks after the paternity suit was filed – it was announced that he had married his newest protégée, 18-year-old Oona O'Neill, the daughter of American playwright Eugene O'Neill. Chaplin, then 54, had been introduced to her by a film agent seven months earlier. (Note: Chaplin and O'Neill met on 30 October 1942 and married on 16 June 1943 in Carpinteria, California. Eugene O'Neill disowned his daughter as a result.) In his autobiography, Chaplin described meeting O'Neill as "the happiest event of my life", and claimed to have found "perfect love". Chaplin's son, Charles III, reported that Oona "worshipped" his father. The couple remained married until Chaplin's death, and had eight children over 18 years: Geraldine Leigh (b. July 1944), Michael John (b. March 1946), Josephine Hannah (b. March 1949), Victoria Agnes (b. May 1951), Eugene Anthony (b. August 1953), Jane Cecil (b. May 1957), Annette Emily (b. December 1959), and Christopher James (b. July 1962).

==== Monsieur Verdoux and communist accusations ====
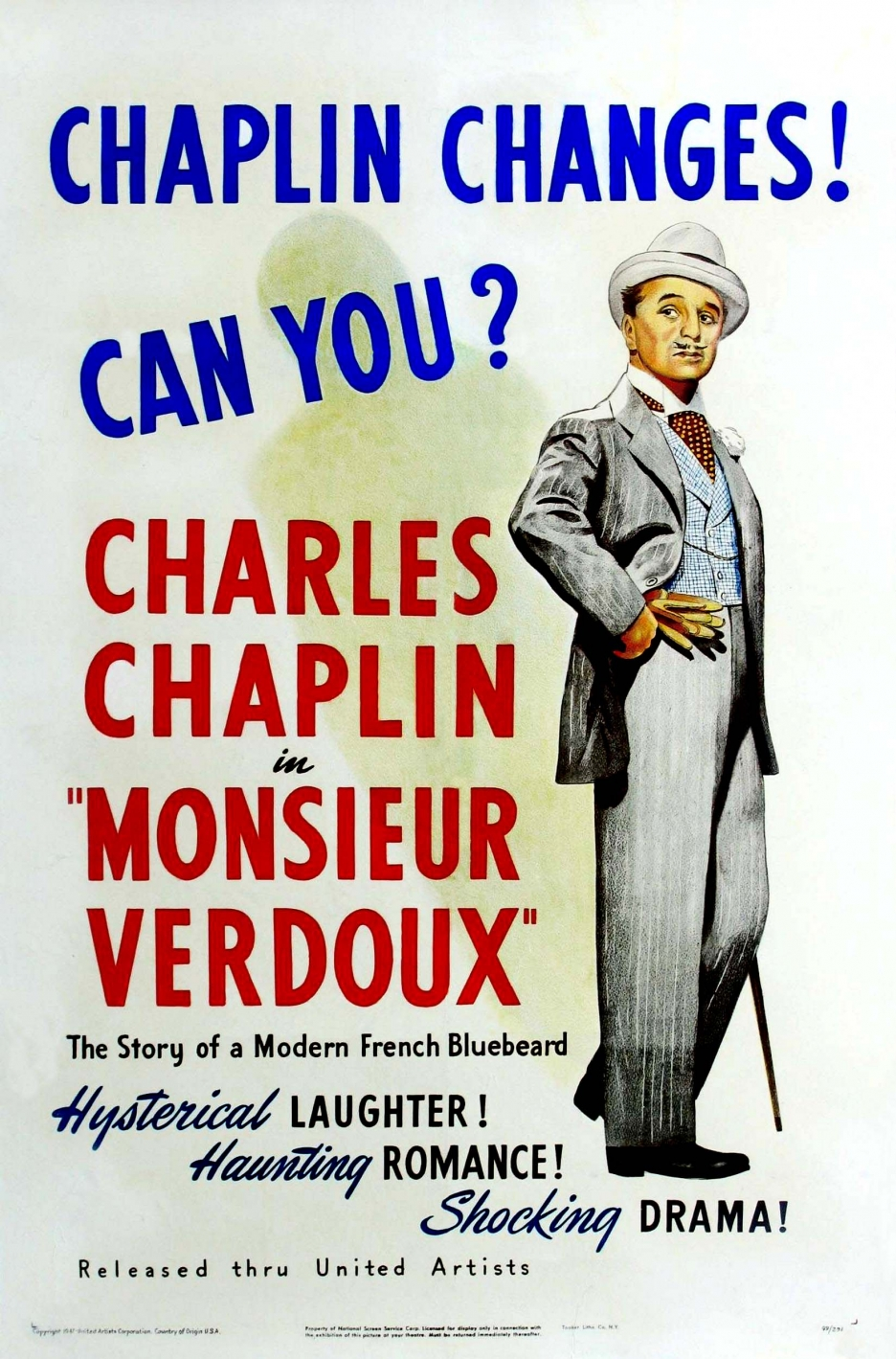
Monsieur Verdoux (1947), a dark comedy about a serial killer, marked a significant departure for Chaplin.

Chaplin claimed that the Barry trials had "crippled [his] creativeness", and it was some time before he began working again. In April 1946, he finally began filming a project that had been in development since 1942. Monsieur Verdoux is a black comedy, the story of a French bank clerk, Verdoux (Chaplin), who loses his job and begins marrying and murdering wealthy widows to support his family. Chaplin's inspiration for the project came from Orson Welles, who wanted him to star in a film about the French serial killer Henri Désiré Landru. Chaplin decided that the concept would "make a wonderful comedy", and paid Welles $5,000 (Note: equivalent to $99,000 in 2025) for the idea.

Chaplin again vocalised his political views in Monsieur Verdoux, criticising capitalism and arguing that the world encourages mass killing through wars and weapons of mass destruction. Because of this, the film met with controversy when it was released in April 1947; Chaplin was booed at the premiere, and there were calls for a boycott. Monsieur Verdoux was the first Chaplin release that failed both critically and commercially in the United States. It was more successful abroad, and Chaplin's screenplay was nominated at the Academy Awards. He was proud of the film, writing in his autobiography, "Monsieur Verdoux is the cleverest and most brilliant film I have yet made."

The negative reaction to Monsieur Verdoux was largely the result of changes in Chaplin's public image. Along with the damage of the Joan Barry scandal, he was publicly accused of being a communist. His political activity had heightened during World War II, when he campaigned for the opening of a Second Front to help the Soviet Union and supported various Soviet–American friendship groups. He was also friendly with several suspected communists, and attended functions given by Soviet diplomats in Los Angeles. In the political climate of 1940s America, such activities meant Chaplin was considered, as Larcher writes, "dangerously progressive and amoral". The FBI wanted him out of the country, and launched an official investigation in early 1947. (Note: Chaplin had already attracted the attention of the FBI long before the 1940s, the first mention of him in their files being from 1922. J. Edgar Hoover first requested that a Security Index Card be filed for Chaplin in September 1946, but the Los Angeles office was slow to react and only began active investigation the next spring. The FBI also requested and received help from MI5, particularly on investigating the false claims that Chaplin had not been born in England but in France or Eastern Europe, and that his real name was Israel Thornstein. MI5 found no evidence of Chaplin being involved in the Communist Party.)

External videos
- Q&A interview with Scott Eyman on Charlie Chaplin vs. America, May 10, 2024, C-SPAN

Chaplin denied being a communist, instead calling himself a "peacemonger", but felt the government's effort to suppress the ideology was an unacceptable infringement of civil liberties. Unwilling to be quiet about the issue, he openly protested against the trials of Communist Party members and the activities of the House Un-American Activities Committee. Chaplin received a subpoena to appear before HUAC but was not called to testify. As his activities were widely reported in the press, and Cold War fears grew, questions were raised over his failure to take American citizenship. Calls were made for him to be deported; in one extreme and widely published example, Representative John E. Rankin, who helped establish HUAC, told Congress in June 1947: "[Chaplin's] very life in Hollywood is detrimental to the moral fabric of America. [If he is deported] ... his loathsome pictures can be kept from before the eyes of the American youth. He should be deported and gotten rid of at once."

In 2003, declassified British archives belonging to the British Foreign Office revealed that author and social critic George Orwell secretly accused Chaplin of being a secret communist and a friend of the USSR in the 1949 Orwell's list document. Chaplin's name was one of 35 that Orwell gave to the Information Research Department (IRD), a secret British Cold War propaganda department which collaborated closely with the CIA. Chaplin was not the only actor in America whom Orwell accused of being a secret communist.

==== Limelight and banning from the United States ====
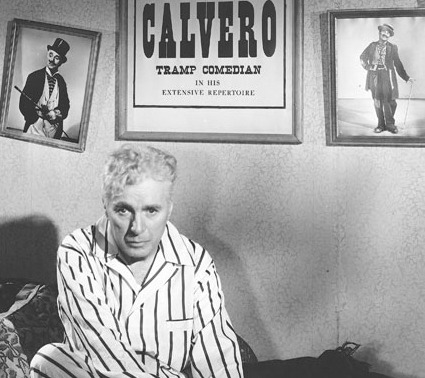
Limelight (1952) was a serious and autobiographical film for Chaplin. His character, Calvero, is an ex-music hall star (described in this image as a "Tramp Comedian") forced to deal with his loss of popularity.

Although Chaplin remained politically active in the years following the failure of Monsieur Verdoux, (Note: In November 1947, Chaplin asked Pablo Picasso to hold a demonstration outside the US embassy in Paris to protest the deportation proceedings of Hanns Eisler, and in December, he took part in a petition asking for the deportation process to be dropped. In 1948, Chaplin supported the unsuccessful presidential campaign of Henry Wallace; and in 1949 he supported two peace conferences and signed a petition protesting the Peekskill incident.) his next film, about a forgotten music hall comedian and a young ballerina in Edwardian London, was devoid of political themes. Limelight was heavily autobiographical, alluding not only to Chaplin's childhood and the lives of his parents, but also to his loss of popularity in the United States. The cast included various members of his family, including his five oldest children and his half-brother, Wheeler Dryden.

Filming began in November 1951, by which time Chaplin had spent three years working on the story. (Note: Limelight was conceived as a novel, which Chaplin wrote but never intended for publication.) He aimed for a more serious tone than any of his previous films, regularly using the word "melancholy" when explaining his plans to his co-star Claire Bloom. Limelight featured a cameo appearance from Buster Keaton, whom Chaplin cast as his stage partner in a pantomime scene. This marked the only time the comedians teamed up in a feature film.

Chaplin decided to hold the world premiere of Limelight in London, since it was the setting of the film. As he left Los Angeles, he expressed a premonition that he would not be returning. At New York, he boarded the RMS Queen Elizabeth with his family on 18 September 1952. The next day, United States Attorney General James P. McGranery revoked Chaplin's re-entry permit and stated that he would have to submit to an interview concerning his political views and moral behaviour to re-enter the US. Although McGranery told the press that he had "a pretty good case against Chaplin", Maland has concluded, on the basis of the FBI files that were released in the 1980s, that the US government had no real evidence to prevent Chaplin's re-entry. It is likely that he would have gained entry if he had applied for it. However, when Chaplin received a cablegram informing him of the news, he privately decided to cut his ties with the United States:

Whether I re-entered that unhappy country or not was of little consequence to me. I would like to have told them that the sooner I was rid of that hate-beleaguered atmosphere the better, that I was fed up of America's insults and moral pomposity ...

Because all of his property remained in America, Chaplin refrained from saying anything negative about the incident to the press. The scandal attracted vast attention, but Chaplin and his film were warmly received in Europe. In America, the hostility towards him continued, and, although it received some positive reviews, Limelight was subjected to a wide-scale boycott. Reflecting on this, Maland writes that Chaplin's fall, from an "unprecedented" level of popularity, "may be the most dramatic in the history of stardom in America".

=== 1953–1977: European years ===
==== Move to Switzerland and A King in New York ====
I have been the object of lies and propaganda by powerful reactionary groups who, by their influence and by the aid of America's yellow press, have created an unhealthy atmosphere in which liberal-minded individuals can be singled out and persecuted. Under these conditions I find it virtually impossible to continue my motion-picture work, and I have therefore given up my residence in the United States.

— Charlie Chaplin's press release regarding his decision not to seek re‑entry to the US

Chaplin did not attempt to return to the United States after his re-entry permit was revoked, and instead sent his wife to settle his affairs. (Note: Before leaving America, Chaplin had ensured that Oona had access to his assets.) The couple decided to settle in Switzerland and, in January 1953, the family moved into their permanent home: Manoir de Ban, a 14-hectare (35-acre) estate overlooking Lake Geneva in Corsier-sur-Vevey. (Note: Robinson speculates that Switzerland was probably chosen because it "was likely to be the most advantageous from a financial point of view".) Chaplin put his Beverly Hills house and studio up for sale in March, and surrendered his re-entry permit in April. The next year, his wife renounced her US citizenship and became a British citizen. Chaplin severed the last of his professional ties with the United States in 1955, when he sold the remainder of his stock in United Artists, which had been in financial difficulty since the early 1940s.

Chaplin remained a controversial figure throughout the 1950s, especially after he was awarded the International Peace Prize by the communist-led World Peace Council, and after his meetings with Zhou Enlai and Nikita Khrushchev. He began developing his first European film, A King in New York, in 1954. Casting himself as an exiled king who seeks asylum in the United States, Chaplin included several of his recent experiences in the screenplay. His son, Michael, was cast as a boy whose parents are targeted by the FBI, while Chaplin's character faces accusations of communism. The political satire parodied HUAC and attacked elements of 1950s culture – including consumerism, plastic surgery, and wide-screen cinema. In a review, the playwright John Osborne called it Chaplin's "most bitter" and "most openly personal" film. In a 1957 interview, when asked to clarify his political views, Chaplin stated "As for politics, I am an anarchist. I hate government and rules – and fetters ... People must be free."

Chaplin founded a new production company, Attica, and used Shepperton Studios for the shooting. Filming in England proved a difficult experience, as he was used to his own Hollywood studio and familiar crew, and no longer had limitless production time. According to Robinson, this had an effect on the quality of the film. A King in New York was released in September 1957, and received mixed reviews. Chaplin banned American journalists from its Paris première and decided not to release the film in the United States. This severely limited its revenue, although it achieved moderate commercial success in Europe. A King in New York was not shown in America until 1973.

==== Final works and renewed appreciation ====
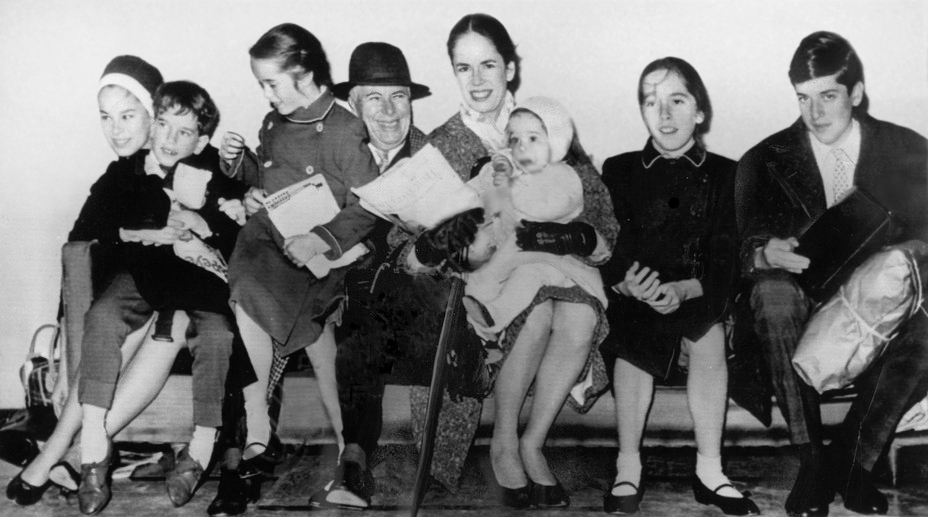
Chaplin with his wife Oona and six of their eight children (Jane and Christopher are absent) in 1961

In the last two decades of his career, Chaplin concentrated on re-editing and scoring his old films for re-release, along with securing their ownership and distribution rights. In an interview he gave in 1959, the year of his 70th birthday, Chaplin stated that there was still "room for the Little Man in the atomic age". The first of these re-releases was The Chaplin Revue (1959), which included new versions of A Dog's Life, Shoulder Arms, and The Pilgrim.

In America, the political atmosphere began to change and attention was once again directed to Chaplin's films instead of his views. In July 1962, the New York Times published an editorial stating, "We do not believe the Republic would be in danger if yesterday's unforgotten little tramp were allowed to amble down the gangplank of a steamer or plane in an American port". The same month, Chaplin was invested with the honorary degree of Doctor of Letters by the universities of Oxford and Durham. In November 1963, the Plaza Theater in New York started a year-long series of Chaplin's films, including Monsieur Verdoux and Limelight, which gained excellent reviews from American critics. September 1964 saw the release of Chaplin's memoir, My Autobiography, which he had been drafting since 1957. The 500-page book became a worldwide best-seller. It focused on his early years and personal life, and was criticised for lacking information on his film career.

Shortly after the publication of his memoir, Chaplin began work on A Countess from Hong Kong (1967), a romantic comedy based on a script he had written for Paulette Goddard in the 1930s. Set on an ocean liner, it starred Marlon Brando as an American ambassador and Sophia Loren as a stowaway found in his cabin. The film differed from Chaplin's earlier productions in several aspects. It was his first to use Technicolor and the widescreen format, while he concentrated on directing and appeared on-screen only in a cameo role as a seasick steward. He also signed a deal with Universal Pictures and appointed his assistant, Jerome Epstein, as the producer. Chaplin was paid $600,000 director's fee as well as a percentage of the gross receipts. A Countess from Hong Kong premiered in January 1967, to unfavourable reviews, and was a box-office failure. Chaplin was deeply hurt by the negative reaction to the film, which turned out to be his last.

Chaplin had a series of minor strokes in the late 1960s, which marked the beginning of a slow decline in his health. Despite the setbacks, he was soon writing a new film script, The Freak, a story of a winged girl found in South America, which he intended as a starring vehicle for his daughter, Victoria. His fragile health prevented the project from being realised. In the early 1970s, Chaplin concentrated on re-releasing his old films, including The Kid and The Circus. In 1971, he was made a Commander of the National Order of the Legion of Honour at the Cannes Film Festival. The following year, he was honoured with a special award by the Venice Film Festival.

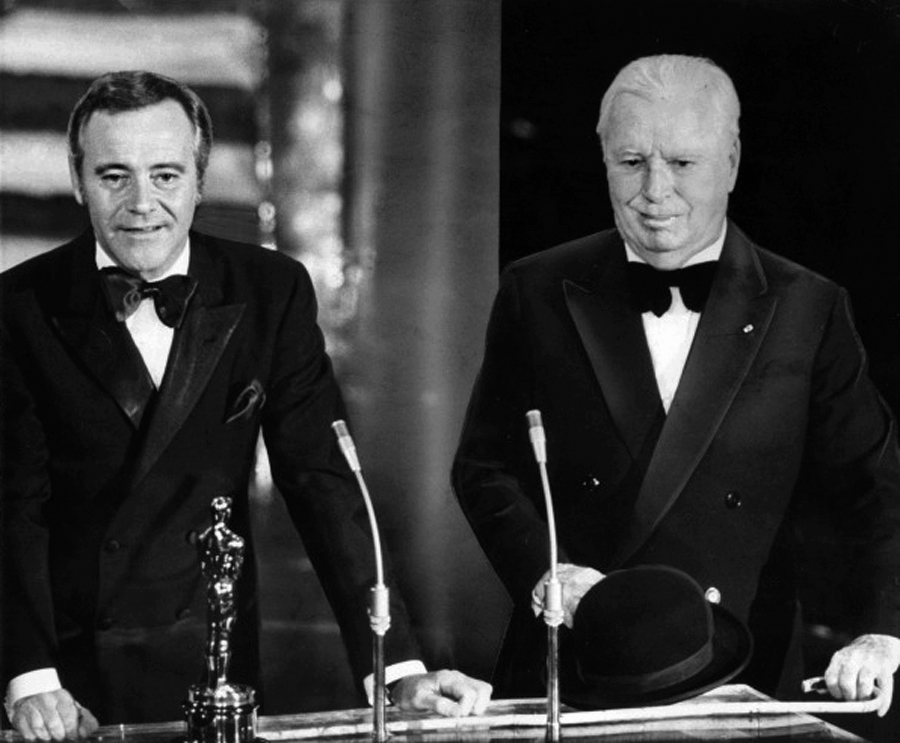
Chaplin (right) receiving his Honorary Academy Award from Jack Lemmon in 1972. It was the first time he had been to the United States in 20 years.

In 1972, the Academy of Motion Picture Arts and Sciences offered Chaplin an Honorary Award, which Robinson sees as a sign that America "wanted to make amends". Chaplin was initially hesitant about accepting but decided to return to the US for the first time in 20 years. The visit attracted a large amount of press coverage and, at the Academy Awards gala, he was given a 12-minute standing ovation, the longest in the academy's history. Visibly emotional, Chaplin accepted his award for "the incalculable effect he has had in making motion pictures the art form of this century".

Although Chaplin still had plans for future film projects, by the mid-1970s he was very frail. He experienced several further strokes, which made it difficult for him to communicate, and he had to use a wheelchair. His final projects were compiling a pictorial autobiography, My Life in Pictures (1974) and scoring A Woman of Paris for re-release in 1976. He also appeared in a documentary about his life, The Gentleman Tramp (1975), directed by Richard Patterson. In the 1975 New Year Honours, Chaplin was awarded a knighthood by Queen Elizabeth II, (Note: The honour had already been proposed in 1931 and 1956, but was vetoed after a Foreign Office report raised concerns over Chaplin's political views and private life. They feared the act would damage the reputation of the British honours system and relations with the United States.) though he was too weak to kneel and received the honour in his wheelchair.

==== Death ====
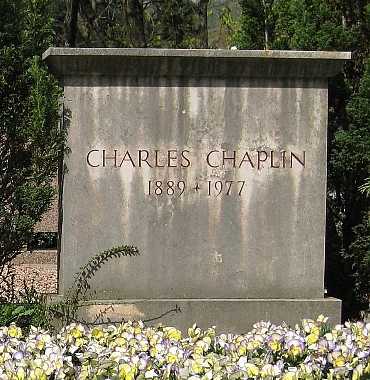
Chaplin's grave in Corsier-sur-Vevey, Switzerland

By October 1977, Chaplin's health had declined to the point that he needed constant care. In the early morning of Christmas Day 1977, Chaplin died at home after having a stroke in his sleep. He was 88 years old. The funeral, on 27 December, was a small and private Anglican ceremony, according to his wishes. (Note: Despite asking for an Anglican funeral, Chaplin appeared to be agnostic. In his autobiography he wrote, "I am not religious in the dogmatic sense ... I neither believe nor disbelieve in anything ... My faith is in the unknown, in all that we do not understand by reason; I believe that ... in the realm of the unknown there is an infinite power for good.") Chaplin was interred in the Corsier-sur-Vevey cemetery. Among the film industry's tributes, director René Clair wrote, "He was a monument of the cinema, of all countries and all times ... the most beautiful gift the cinema made to us." Actor Bob Hope declared, "We were lucky to have lived in his time." Chaplin left more than $100 million to his widow.

On 1 March 1978, Chaplin's coffin was dug up and stolen from its grave by Roman Wardas and Gantcho Ganev. The body was held for ransom in an attempt to extort money from his widow, Oona Chaplin. The pair were caught in a large police operation in May, and Chaplin's coffin was found buried in a field in the nearby village of Noville. It was re-interred in the Corsier cemetery in a reinforced concrete vault.

== Filmmaking ==
=== Influences ===
Chaplin believed his first influence to be his mother, who entertained him as a child by sitting at the window and mimicking passers-by. He once stated "it was through watching her that I learned not only how to express emotions with my hands and face, but also how to observe and study people". Chaplin's early years in music hall allowed him to see stage comedians at work, he also attended the Christmas pantomimes at Drury Lane, where he studied the art of clowning through performers like Dan Leno. Chaplin's years with the Fred Karno company had a formative effect on him as an actor and filmmaker. Simon Louvish writes that the company was his "training ground", and it was here that Chaplin learned to vary the pace of his comedy. The concept of mixing pathos with slapstick was learnt from Karno, (Note: Stan Laurel, Chaplin's co-performer at the company, remembered that Karno's sketches regularly inserted "a bit of sentiment right in the middle of a funny music hall turn".) who also used elements of absurdity that became familiar in Chaplin's gags. From the film industry, Chaplin drew upon the work of the French comedian Max Linder, whose films he greatly admired. In developing the Tramp costume and persona, he was likely inspired by the American vaudeville scene, where tramp characters were common.

=== Method ===
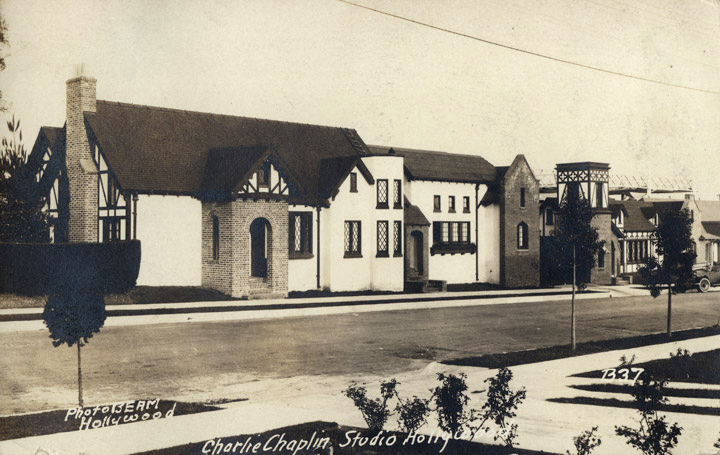
A 1922 image of Charlie Chaplin Studios, where all of Chaplin's films between 1918 and 1952 were produced

Chaplin never spoke more than cursorily about his filmmaking methods, claiming such a thing would be tantamount to a magician spoiling his own illusion. Little was known about his working process throughout his lifetime, but research from film historians – particularly the findings of Kevin Brownlow and David Gill that were presented in the three-part documentary Unknown Chaplin (1983) – has since revealed his unique working method.

Until he began making spoken dialogue films with The Great Dictator (1940), Chaplin never shot from a completed script. Many of his early films began with only a vague premise, for example "Charlie enters a health spa" or "Charlie works in a pawn shop". He then had sets constructed and played with his stock company to improvise gags and "business" using them, almost always devising the ideas on film. As ideas were accepted and discarded, a narrative structure would emerge, frequently requiring Chaplin to reshoot an already-completed scene that might have otherwise contradicted the story. From A Woman of Paris (1923) onward Chaplin began the filming process with a prepared plot, but Robinson writes that every film up to Modern Times (1936) "went through many metamorphoses and permutations before the story took its final form".

Producing films in this manner meant Chaplin took longer to complete his pictures than almost any other filmmaker at the time. If he was out of ideas, he often took a break from the shoot, which could last for days, while keeping the studio ready for when inspiration returned. Delaying the process further was Chaplin's rigorous perfectionism. According to his friend Ivor Montagu, "nothing but perfection would be right" for the filmmaker. Because he personally funded his films, Chaplin was at liberty to strive for this goal and shoot as many takes as he wished. The number was often excessive, for instance 53 takes for every finished take in The Kid (1921). For The Immigrant (1917), a 20-minute short, Chaplin shot 40,000 feet of film – enough for a feature-length.

No other filmmaker ever so completely dominated every aspect of the work, did every job. If he could have done so, Chaplin would have played every role and (as his son Sydney humorously but perceptively observed) sewn every costume.

— Chaplin biographer David Robinson

Describing his working method as "sheer perseverance to the point of madness", Chaplin would be completely consumed by the production of a picture. Robinson writes that even in Chaplin's later years, his films continued "to take precedence over everything and everyone else". The culmination of story improvisation and relentless perfectionism – which resulted in days of effort and thousands of feet of film being wasted, all at enormous expense – often proved taxing for Chaplin who, in frustration, would lash out at his actors and crew.

Chaplin exercised complete control over his pictures, to the extent that he would act out the other roles for his cast, expecting them to imitate him exactly. He personally edited all of his films, trawling through the large amounts of footage to create the exact picture he wanted. As a result of his complete independence, he was identified by the film historian Andrew Sarris as one of the first auteur filmmakers. Chaplin did receive help from his long-time cinematographer Roland Totheroh, brother Sydney Chaplin, and various assistant directors such as Harry Crocker and Charles Reisner.

=== Style and themes ===
Collection of scenes from The Kid (1921) that demonstrate Chaplin's use of slapstick, pathos, and social commentary

While Chaplin's comedic style is broadly defined as slapstick, it is considered restrained and intelligent, with the film historian Philip Kemp describing his work as a mix of "deft, balletic physical comedy and thoughtful, situation-based gags". Chaplin diverged from conventional slapstick by slowing the pace and exhausting each scene of its comic potential, with more focus on developing the viewer's relationship to the characters. Unlike conventional slapstick comedies, Robinson states that the comic moments in Chaplin's films centre on the Tramp's attitude to the things happening to him: the humour does not come from the Tramp bumping into a tree, but from his lifting his hat to the tree in apology. Dan Kamin writes that Chaplin's "quirky mannerisms" and "serious demeanour in the midst of slapstick action" are other key aspects of his comedy, while the surreal transformation of objects and the employment of in-camera trickery are also common features. His signature style consisted of gestural idiosyncrasies like askew derby hat, drooping shoulders, deflated chest and dangling arms and tilted back pelvis to enrich the comic persona of his 'tramp' character. His shabby but neat clothing and incessant grooming behaviour along with his geometrical walk and movement gave his onscreen characters a puppet-like quality.

Chaplin's silent films typically follow the Tramp's efforts to survive in a hostile world. The character lives in poverty and is frequently treated badly, but remains kind and upbeat, defying his social position, he strives to be seen as a gentleman. As Chaplin said in 1925, "The whole point of the Little Fellow is that no matter how down on his ass he is, no matter how well the jackals succeed in tearing him apart, he's still a man of dignity". The Tramp defies authority figures and "gives as good as he gets", leading Robinson and Louvish to see him as a representative for the underprivileged – an "everyman turned heroic saviour". Hansmeyer notes that several of Chaplin's films end with "the homeless and lonely Tramp [walking] optimistically ... into the sunset ... to continue his journey."

It is paradoxical that tragedy stimulates the spirit of ridicule ... ridicule, I suppose, is an attitude of defiance, we must laugh in the face of our helplessness against the forces of nature – or go insane.

— Charlie Chaplin, explaining why his comedies often make fun of tragic circumstances

The infusion of pathos is a well-known aspect of Chaplin's work, and Larcher notes his reputation for "[inducing] laughter and tears". Sentimentality in his films comes from a variety of sources, with Louvish pinpointing "personal failure, society's strictures, economic disaster, and the elements". Chaplin sometimes drew on tragic events when creating his films, as in the case of The Gold Rush (1925), which was inspired by the fate of the Donner Party. Constance B. Kuriyama has identified serious underlying themes in the early comedies, such as greed (The Gold Rush) and loss (The Kid). Chaplin also touched on controversial issues: immigration (The Immigrant, 1917), illegitimacy (The Kid, 1921), and drug use (Easy Street, 1917). He often explored these topics ironically, making comedy out of suffering.

Social commentary was a feature of Chaplin's films from early in his career, as he portrayed the underdog in a sympathetic light and highlighted the difficulties of the poor. Later, as he developed a keen interest in economics and felt obliged to publicise his views, Chaplin began incorporating overtly political messages into his films. Modern Times (1936) depicted factory workers in dismal conditions, The Great Dictator (1940) parodied Adolf Hitler and Benito Mussolini and ended in a speech against nationalism, Monsieur Verdoux (1947) criticised war and capitalism, and A King in New York (1957) attacked McCarthyism.

Several of Chaplin's films incorporate autobiographical elements, and the psychologist Sigmund Freud believed that Chaplin "always plays only himself as he was in his dismal youth". The Kid is thought to reflect Chaplin's childhood trauma of being sent into an orphanage, the main characters in Limelight (1952) contain elements from the lives of his parents, and A King in New York references Chaplin's experiences of being shunned by the United States. Many of his sets, especially in street scenes, bear a strong similarity to Kennington, where he grew up. Stephen M. Weissman has argued that Chaplin's problematic relationship with his mentally ill mother was often reflected in his female characters and the Tramp's desire to save them.

Regarding the structure of Chaplin's films, the scholar Gerald Mast sees them as consisting of sketches tied together by the same theme and setting, rather than having a tightly unified storyline. Visually, his films are simple and economic, with scenes portrayed as if set on a stage. His approach to filming was described by the art director Eugène Lourié: "Chaplin did not think in 'artistic' images when he was shooting. He believed that action is the main thing. The camera is there to photograph the actors". In his autobiography, Chaplin wrote, "Simplicity is best ... pompous effects slow up action, are boring and unpleasant ... The camera should not intrude." This approach has prompted criticism, since the 1940s, for being "old fashioned", while the film scholar Donald McCaffrey sees it as an indication that Chaplin never completely understood film as a medium. Kamin, however, comments that Chaplin's comedic talent would not be enough to remain funny on screen if he did not have an "ability to conceive and direct scenes specifically for the film medium".

=== Composing ===
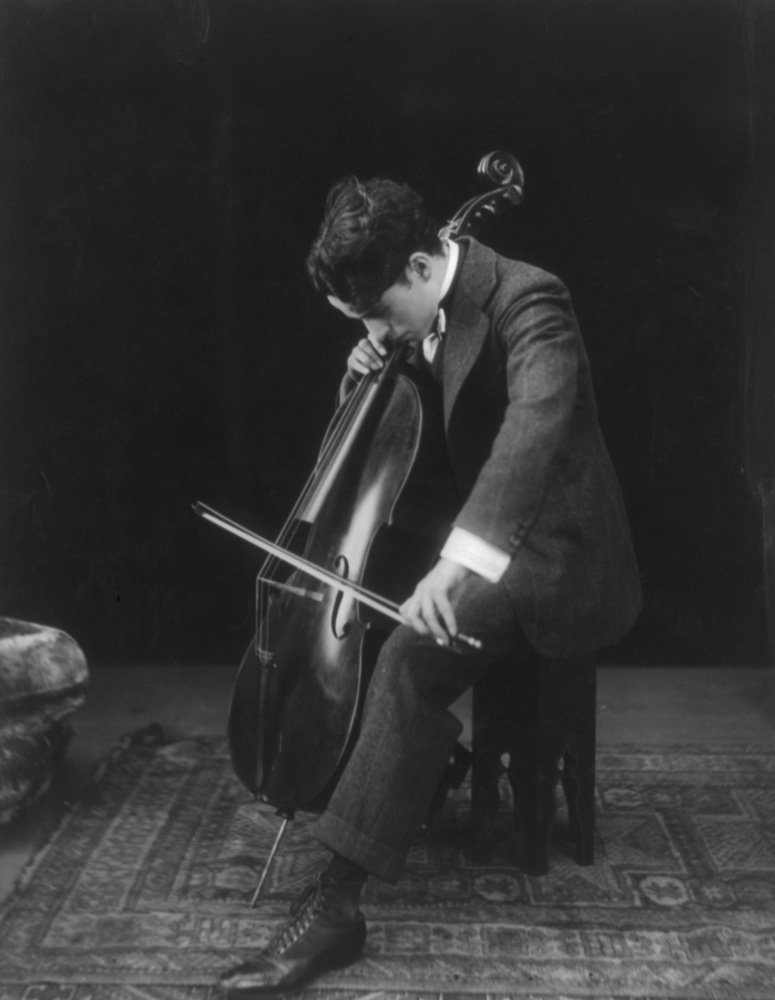
Chaplin playing the cello in 1915

Chaplin developed a passion for music as a child and taught himself to play the piano, violin, and cello. He considered the musical accompaniment of a film to be important, and from A Woman of Paris onwards he took an increasing interest in this area. With the advent of sound technology, Chaplin began using a synchronised orchestral soundtrack – composed by himself – for City Lights (1931). He thereafter composed the scores for all of his films, and from the late 1950s to his death, he scored all of his silent features and some of his short films.

As Chaplin was not a trained musician, he could not read sheet music and needed the help of professional composers, such as David Raksin, Raymond Rasch and Eric James, when creating his scores. Musical directors were employed to oversee the recording process, such as Alfred Newman for City Lights. Although some critics have claimed that credit for his film music should be given to the composers who worked with him, Raksin – who worked with Chaplin on Modern Times – stressed Chaplin's creative position and active participation in the composing process. This process, which could take months, would start with Chaplin describing to the composer(s) exactly what he wanted and singing or playing tunes he had improvised on the piano. These tunes were then developed further in a close collaboration among the composer(s) and Chaplin. According to film historian Jeffrey Vance, "although he relied upon associates to arrange varied and complex instrumentation, the musical imperative is his, and not a note in a Chaplin musical score was placed there without his assent."

Chaplin's compositions produced three popular songs. "Smile", composed originally for Modern Times (1936) and later set to lyrics by John Turner and Geoffrey Parsons, was a hit for Nat King Cole in 1954. For Limelight, Chaplin composed "Terry's Theme", which was popularised by Jimmy Young as "Eternally" (1952). Finally, "This Is My Song", performed by Petula Clark for A Countess from Hong Kong (1967), reached number one on the UK and other European charts. Chaplin also received his only competitive Oscar for his composition work, as the Limelight theme won an Academy Award for Best Original Score in 1973 following the film's re-release. (Note: Although the film had originally been released in 1952, it did not play for one week in Los Angeles because of its boycott, and thus did not meet the criterion for nomination until it was re-released in 1972.)

== Filmography ==
Directed features:

- The Kid (1921)
- A Woman of Paris (1923)
- The Gold Rush (1925)
- The Circus (1928)
- City Lights (1931)
- Modern Times (1936)
- The Great Dictator (1940)
- Monsieur Verdoux (1947)
- Limelight (1952)
- A King in New York (1957)
- The Chaplin Revue (1959)
- A Countess from Hong Kong (1967)

== Awards and nominations ==
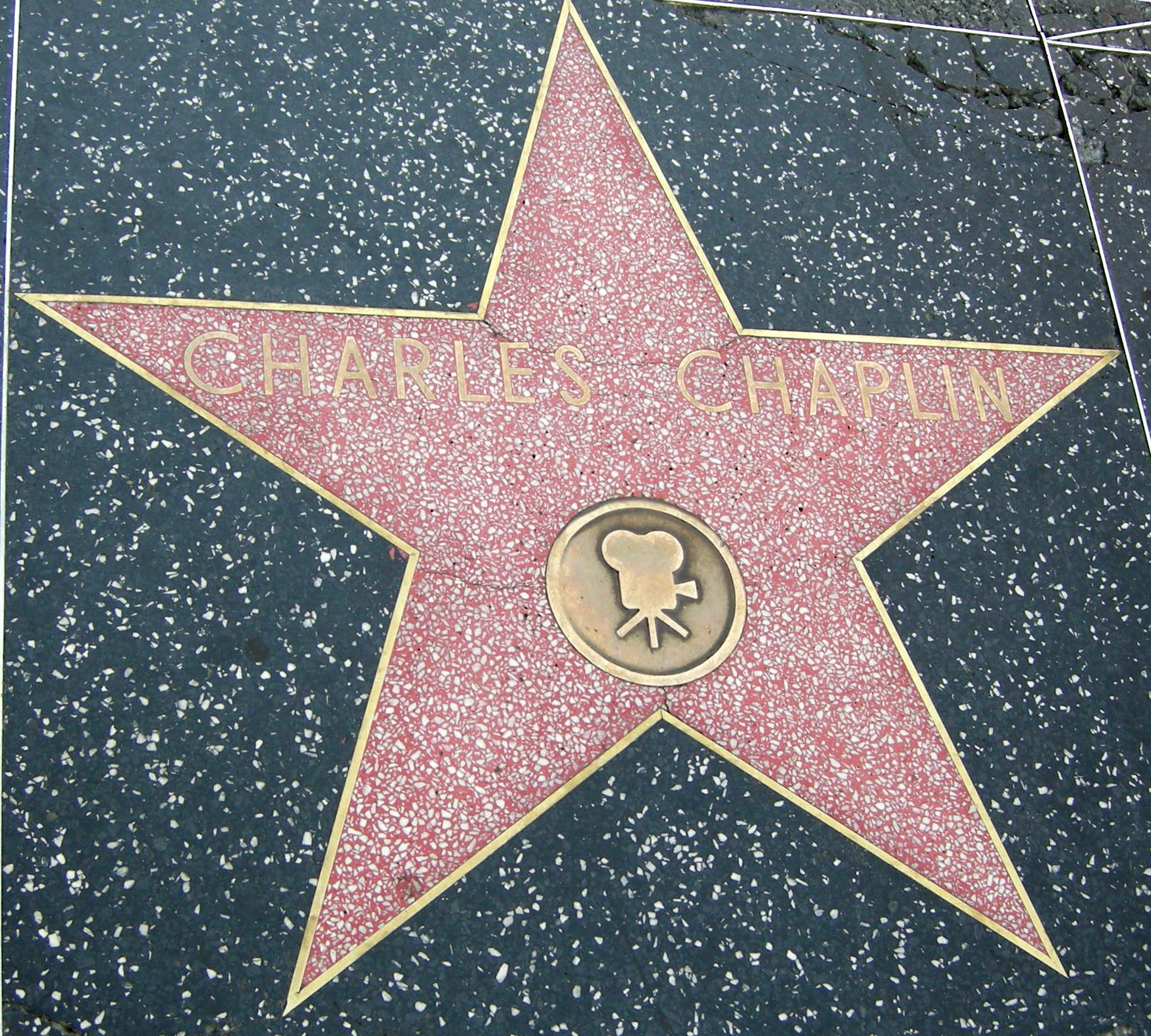
Star on the Hollywood Walk of Fame at 6755 Hollywood Boulevard

Chaplin received many awards and honours, especially later in life. In the 1975 New Year Honours, he was appointed a Knight Commander of the Order of the British Empire (KBE). He was also awarded honorary Doctor of Letters degrees by the University of Oxford and the University of Durham in 1962. In 1965, he and Ingmar Bergman were joint winners of the Erasmus Prize and, in 1971, he was appointed a Commander of the National Order of the Legion of Honour by the French government. From the film industry, Chaplin received a special Golden Lion at the Venice Film Festival in 1972, and a Lifetime Achievement Award from the Lincoln Center Film Society the same year. The latter has since been presented annually to filmmakers as The Chaplin Award. Chaplin was given a star on the Hollywood Walk of Fame in 1972, having been previously excluded because of his political beliefs.

Chaplin received three Academy Awards: an Honorary Award for "versatility and genius in acting, writing, directing, and producing The Circus" in 1929, a second Honorary Award for "the incalculable effect he has had in making motion pictures the art form of this century" in 1972, and a Best Score award in 1973 for Limelight (shared with Ray Rasch and Larry Russell). He was further nominated in the Best Actor, Best Original Screenplay, and Best Picture (as producer) categories for The Great Dictator, and received another Best Original Screenplay nomination for Monsieur Verdoux. In 1976, Chaplin was made a Fellow of the British Academy of Film and Television Arts (BAFTA). Six of Chaplin's films have been selected for preservation in the National Film Registry by the United States Library of Congress: The Immigrant (1917), The Kid (1921), The Gold Rush (1925), City Lights (1931), Modern Times (1936), and The Great Dictator (1940).

Association	Year	Category	Work	Result	Ref(s)
Academy Awards	1929	Academy Honorary Award	The Circus	Honoured (Note: The Circus originally received three nominations: Best Director (Comedy Picture), Best Actor, and Best Writing (Original Story) – for Chaplin. However, the Academy subsequently decided to remove Chaplin's name from the competitive award categories and instead to confer upon him a Special Award "for acting, writing, directing and producing The Circus".)	
Academy Awards	1941	Best Actor	The Great Dictator	Nominated	
Academy Awards	1941	Best Original Screenplay	The Great Dictator	Nominated	
Academy Awards	1948	Best Original Screenplay	Monsieur Verdoux	Nominated	
Academy Awards	1972	Academy Honorary Award		Honoured	
Academy Awards	1973	Best Original Dramatic Score	Limelight	Won	
British Academy Film Awards	1976	BAFTA Fellowship		Honoured	
Directors Guild of America Awards	1974	Honorary Life Member		Honoured	
Film Society of Lincoln Center	1972	Gala Tribute		Honoured	
Hollywood Walk of Fame	1972	Motion Picture Star		Honoured	
National Board of Review Awards	1940	Best Acting	The Great Dictator	Won	
New York Film Critics Circle Awards	1940	Best Actor	The Great Dictator	Won (Note: Chaplin refused the award.)	
New York Film Critics Circle Awards	1952	Best Director	Limelight	Runner-up	
New York Film Critics Circle Awards	1952	Best Actor	Limelight	Runner-up	
Venice Film Festival	1972	Golden Lion for Lifetime Achievement		Honoured	

Directed Academy Award performances
Under Chaplin's direction, these actors have received Academy Award nominations for their performances in their respective roles.

Year	Performer	Film	Result
Academy Award for Best Actor
1928	Himself	The Circus	Nominated
1940	Himself	The Great Dictator	Nominated
Academy Award for Best Supporting Actor
1940	Jack Oakie	The Great Dictator	Nominated

== Legacy ==
=== Recognition ===
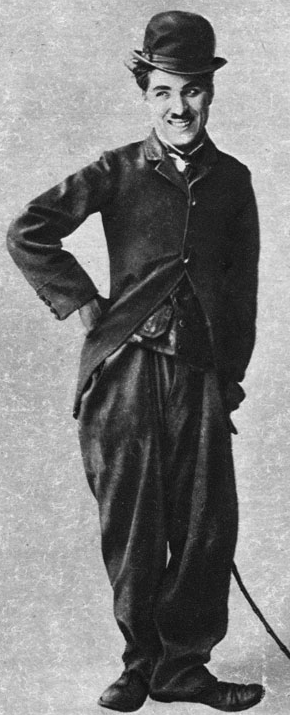
Chaplin as the Tramp, cinema's "most universal icon", in 1915

In 1998, the film critic Andrew Sarris called Chaplin "arguably the single most important artist produced by the cinema, certainly its most extraordinary performer and probably still its most universal icon". He is described by the British Film Institute as "a towering figure in world culture", and was included in Time magazine's list of the "100 Most Important People of the 20th Century" for the "laughter [he brought] to millions" and because he "more or less invented global recognizability and helped turn an industry into an art". In 1999, the American Film Institute ranked Chaplin as the 10th greatest male star of Classic Hollywood Cinema.

The image of the Tramp has become a part of cultural history; according to Simon Louvish, the character is recognisable to people who have never seen a Chaplin film, and in places where his films are never shown. The critic Leonard Maltin has written of the "unique" and "indelible" nature of the Tramp, and argued that no other comedian matched his "worldwide impact". Praising the character, Richard Schickel suggests that Chaplin's films with the Tramp contain the most "eloquent, richly comedic expressions of the human spirit" in movie history. Memorabilia connected to the character still fetches large sums in auctions: in 2006 a bowler hat and a bamboo cane that were part of the Tramp's costume were bought for $140,000 in a Los Angeles auction.

As a filmmaker, Chaplin is considered a pioneer and one of the most influential figures of the early twentieth century. He is often credited as one of the medium's first artists. Film historian Mark Cousins has written that Chaplin "changed not only the imagery of cinema, but also its sociology and grammar" and claims that Chaplin was as important to the development of comedy as a genre as D. W. Griffith was to drama. He was the first to popularise feature-length comedy and to slow down the pace of action, adding pathos and subtlety to it. Although his work is mostly classified as slapstick, Chaplin's drama A Woman of Paris (1923) was a major influence on Ernst Lubitsch's film The Marriage Circle (1924) and thus played a part in the development of "sophisticated comedy". According to David Robinson, Chaplin's innovations were "rapidly assimilated to become part of the common practice of film craft". Filmmakers who cited Chaplin as an influence include Federico Fellini (who called Chaplin "a sort of Adam, from whom we are all descended"), Jacques Tati ("Without him I would never have made a film"), René Clair ("He inspired practically every filmmaker"), François Truffaut ("My religion is cinema. I believe in Charlie Chaplin…"), Michael Powell, Billy Wilder, Vittorio De Sica, and Richard Attenborough. Russian filmmaker Andrei Tarkovsky praised Chaplin as "the only person to have gone down into cinematic history without any shadow of a doubt. The films he left behind can never grow old." Indian filmmaker Satyajit Ray said about Chaplin "If there is any name which can be said to symbolise cinema – it is Charlie Chaplin… I am sure Chaplin's name will survive even if the cinema ceases to exist as a medium of artistic expression. Chaplin is truly immortal." French auteur Jean Renoir's favourite filmmaker was Chaplin.

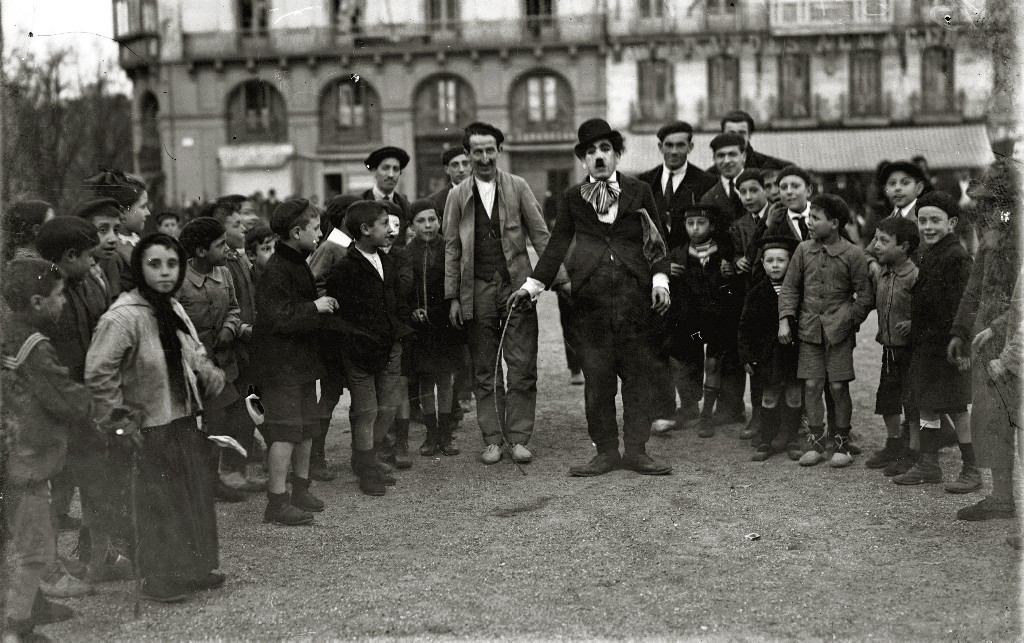
A Chaplin impersonator and his audience in San Sebastián, Spain, in 1919

Chaplin also strongly influenced the work of later comedians. Marcel Marceau said he was inspired to become a mime artist after watching Chaplin, while the actor Raj Kapoor based his screen persona on the Tramp. Mark Cousins has also detected Chaplin's comedic style in the French character Monsieur Hulot and the Italian character Totò. In other fields, Chaplin helped inspire the cartoon characters Felix the Cat and Mickey Mouse, and was an influence on the Dada art movement. As one of the founding members of United Artists, Chaplin also had a role in the development of the film industry. Gerald Mast has written that although UA never became a major company like MGM or Paramount Pictures, the idea that directors could produce their own films was "years ahead of its time".

In 1992, the Sight & Sound Critics' Top Ten Poll ranked Chaplin at No. 5 in its list of "Top 10 Directors" of all time. In the 21st century, several of Chaplin's films are still regarded as classics and among the greatest ever made. The 2012 Sight & Sound poll, which compiles "top ten" ballots from film critics and directors to determine each group's most acclaimed films, saw City Lights rank among the critics' top 50, Modern Times inside the top 100, and The Great Dictator and The Gold Rush placed in the top 250. The top 100 films as voted on by directors included Modern Times at number 22, City Lights at number 30, and The Gold Rush at number 91. Every one of Chaplin's features received a vote. Chaplin was ranked at No. 35 on Empire magazine's "Top 40 Greatest Directors of All-Time" list in 2005. In 2007, the American Film Institute named City Lights the 11th greatest American film of all time, while The Gold Rush and Modern Times again ranked in the top 100. Books about Chaplin continue to be published regularly, and he is a popular subject for media scholars and film archivists. Many of Chaplin's films have had a DVD and Blu-ray release.

Chaplin's legacy is managed on behalf of his children by the Chaplin office, located in Paris. The office represents Association Chaplin, founded by some of his children "to protect the name, image and moral rights" to his body of work, Roy Export SAS, which owns the copyright to most of his films made after 1918, and Bubbles Incorporated S.A., which owns the copyrights to his image and name. Their central archive is held at the archives of Montreux, Switzerland and scanned versions of its contents, including 83,630 images, 118 scripts, 976 manuscripts, 7,756 letters, and thousands of other documents, are available for research purposes at the Chaplin Research Centre at the Cineteca di Bologna. The photographic archive, which includes approximately 10,000 photographs from Chaplin's life and career, is kept at the Musée de l'Elysée in Lausanne, Switzerland. The British Film Institute has also established the Charles Chaplin Research Foundation, and the first international Charles Chaplin Conference was held in London in July 2005. Elements for many of Chaplin's films are held by the Academy Film Archive as part of the Roy Export Chaplin Collection.

=== Commemoration and tributes ===
Chaplin's final home, Manoir de Ban in Corsier-sur-Vevey, Switzerland, has been converted into a museum named "Chaplin's World". It opened on 17 April 2016 after fifteen years of development, and is described by Reuters as "an interactive museum showcasing the life and works of Charlie Chaplin". On the 128th anniversary of his birth, a record-setting 662 people dressed as the Tramp in an event organised by the museum. Previously, the Museum of the Moving Image in London held a permanent display on Chaplin, and hosted a dedicated exhibition to his life and career in 1988. The London Film Museum hosted an exhibition called Charlie Chaplin – The Great Londoner, from 2010 until 2013.

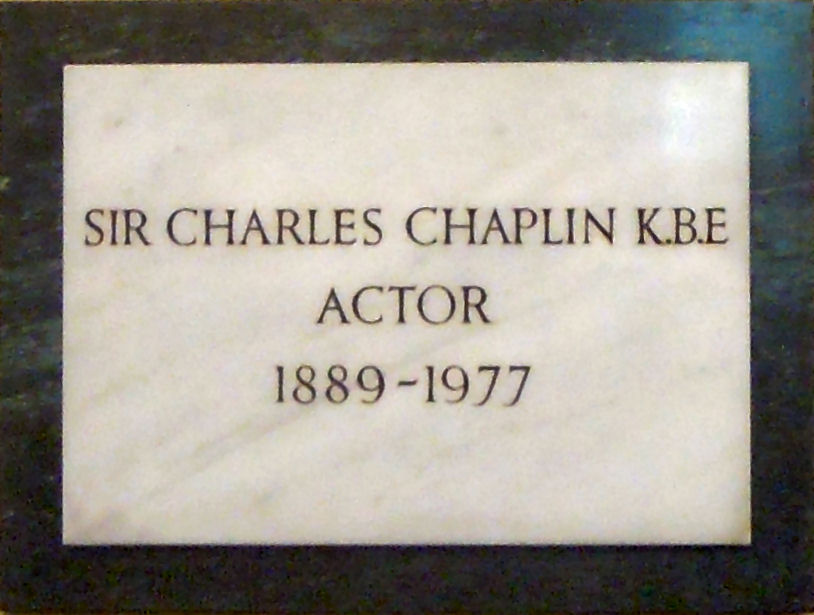
Chaplin memorial plaque in St Paul's, Covent Garden, London

In London, a statue of Chaplin as the Tramp, sculpted by John Doubleday and unveiled in 1981, is located in Leicester Square. The city also includes a road named after him in central London, "Charlie Chaplin Walk", which is the location of the BFI IMAX. There are nine blue plaques memorialising Chaplin in London, Hampshire, and Yorkshire. In Canning Town, East London, the Gandhi Chaplin Memorial Garden, opened by Chaplin's granddaughter Oona Chaplin in 2015, commemorates the meeting between Chaplin and Mahatma Gandhi at a local house in 1931. The Swiss town of Vevey named a park in his honour in 1980 and erected a statue there in 1982. In 2011, two large murals depicting Chaplin on two 14-storey buildings were also unveiled in Vevey. Chaplin has also been honoured by the Irish town of Waterville, where he spent several summers with his family in the 1960s. A statue was erected in 1998; since 2011, the town has been host to the annual Charlie Chaplin Comedy Film Festival, which was founded to celebrate Chaplin's legacy and to showcase new comic talent. In 2021, the alley where Chaplin shot The Kid was renamed Chaplin-Keaton-Lloyd Alley in honour of Chaplin and his contemporaries.

In other tributes, a minor planet, 3623 Chaplin (discovered by Soviet astronomer Lyudmila Karachkina in 1981) is named after him. Throughout the 1980s, the Tramp image was used by IBM to advertise their personal computers. Chaplin's 100th birthday anniversary in 1989 was marked with several events around the world, (Note: On his birthday, 16 April, City Lights was screened at a gala at the Dominion Theatre in London, the site of its British premiere in 1931. In Hollywood, a screening of a restored version of How to Make Movies was held at his former studio, and in Japan, he was honoured with a musical tribute. Retrospectives of his work were presented that year at The National Film Theatre in London, the Munich Stadtmuseum and the Museum of Modern Art in New York, which also dedicated a gallery exhibition, Chaplin: A Centennial Celebration, to him.) and on 15 April 2011, a day before his 122nd birthday, Google celebrated him with a special Google Doodle video on its global and other country-wide homepages.

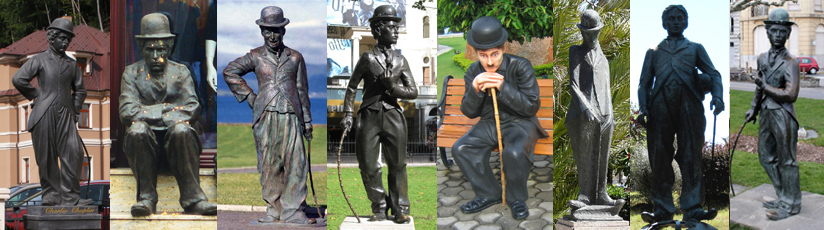
Statues of Chaplin around the world, located at (left to right) 1. Trenčianske Teplice, Slovakia; 2. Chełmża, Poland; 3. Waterville, Ireland; 4. London, England; 5. Hyderabad, India; 6. Alassio, Italy; 7. Barcelona, Spain; 8. Vevey, Switzerland

=== Characterisations ===
Chaplin is the subject of a biographical film, Chaplin (1992) directed by Richard Attenborough and starring Robert Downey Jr. in the title role, with Geraldine Chaplin playing Hannah Chaplin. He is also a character in the historical drama film The Cat's Meow (2001), played by Eddie Izzard, and in the made-for-television movie The Scarlett O'Hara War (1980), played by Clive Revill. A television series about Chaplin's childhood, Young Charlie Chaplin, ran on PBS in 1989, and was nominated for an Emmy Award for Outstanding Children's Program. The French film The Price of Fame (2014) is a fictionalised account of the robbery of Chaplin's grave. Tommy Steele in Search of Charlie Chaplin investigated Chaplin's roots in south-east London.

Chaplin's life has also been the subject of several stage productions. Two musicals, Little Tramp and Chaplin, were produced in the early 1990s. In 2006, Thomas Meehan and Christopher Curtis created another musical, Limelight: The Story of Charlie Chaplin, which was first performed at the La Jolla Playhouse in San Diego in 2010. It was adapted for Broadway two years later, re-titled Chaplin – A Musical. Chaplin was portrayed by Rob McClure in both productions. In 2013, two plays about Chaplin premiered in Finland: Chaplin at the Svenska Teatern, and Kulkuri (The Tramp) at the Tampere Workers' Theatre. In 2025, Pan Asian Repertory Theatre in New York City produced My Man Kono, a play about Chaplin's relationship with Toraichi Kono.

Chaplin has also been characterised in literary fiction. He is the protagonist of Robert Coover's short story "Charlie in the House of Rue" (1980; reprinted in Coover's 1987 collection A Night at the Movies), and of Glen David Gold's Sunnyside (2009), a historical novel set in the First World War period. A day in Chaplin's life in 1909 is dramatised in the chapter titled "Modern Times" in Alan Moore's Jerusalem (2016), a novel set in the author's home town of Northampton, England. In Gorman Bechard's debut novel The Second Greatest Story Ever Told, Chaplin is named as the second coming of Jesus Christ.

=== Legal precedent ===
A lawsuit brought by Chaplin, Chaplin v. Amador, 93 Cal. App. 358 (1928), set an important legal precedent – that a performer's persona and style, in this case Chaplin's "particular kind or type of mustache, old and threadbare hat, clothes and shoes, a decrepit derby, ill-fitting vest, tight-fitting coat, and trousers and shoes much too large for him, and with this attire, a flexible cane usually carried, swung and bent as he performs his part", is entitled to legal protection from those unfairly mimicking those traits in order to deceive the public. The case was an important milestone in U.S. courts' ultimate recognition of a common-law right of publicity.

== Written works ==
- Chaplin, Charlie (1922). My Wonderful Visit. London: Hurst & Blackett. OCLC 253039607.
- —; Haven, Lisa Stein (2014). A Comedian Sees the World. Columbia: University of Missouri Press. OCLC 894511668. (Note: This memoir was first published as a set of five articles in "Women's Home Companion" from September 1933 to January 1934, but until 2014 had never been published as a book in the U.S.)
- —; Robinson, David (2014). Charlie Chaplin: Footlights with The World of Limelight. Bologna: Edizioni Cineteca di Bologna. OCLC 876089834. (Note: Before Limelight (1952) was conceived as a screenplay, Chaplin wrote Footlights as a 34,000-word novella. Begun on 13 September 1948 with the help of Lee Cobin, it was finished two years later in 1950. Remaining virtually unknown for more than 60 years after its completion, Footlights is published here for the very first time.)
- — (1964). My Autobiography. New York: Simon & Schuster. OCLC 1145727022.
- — (1974). My Life In Pictures. New York: Grosset & Dunlap. OCLC 1064991796.
- —; Hayes, Kevin J. (2005). Charlie Chaplin: Interviews. Jackson: University Press of Mississippi. OCLC 54844183. (Note: A collection of 24 interviews spanning 1915–1967.)
