= Chaplin (name) =

Chaplin is a surname with multiple etymologies. Surnames of English and French origin are derived from the occupational name for a clergyman, while the Belarusian, Ukrainian, and Russian surname is derived from chaplya, meaning 'heron' or 'stork'. The surname Chaplin may refer to:

== People named Chaplin ==
- Alice Chaplin (1848–1921), English artist
- Archie Chaplin (born 2005), English footballer
- Ben Chaplin (born: Benedict Greenwood 1970), English actor
- Blondie Chaplin (born 1951), South African musician
- Carmen Chaplin (born 1972), actress, granddaughter of Charlie Chaplin
- Charles Chaplin, various including:
  - Charlie Chaplin (1889–1977), English comedy film actor - silent and "talkie" - and director
    - Charles Chaplin Jr. (1925–1968), American actor, son of comedian Charlie Chaplin
  - Charles Chaplin (artist) (1907–1987), English artist, engraver and printmaker
  - Charles Chaplin (elder) (1759–1816), British Member of Parliament for Lincolnshire 1802–1816
  - Charles Chaplin (younger) (1786–1859), British Member of Parliament for Stamford 1809–1812, and for Lincolnshire 1818–1831
  - Charles Joshua Chaplin (1825–1891), French painter
  - Charlie Chaplin (singer), Jamaican dancehall and ragga singer
- Christopher Chaplin (born 1962), actor, son of comedian Charlie Chaplin
- Conor Chaplin (born 1997), English footballer
- Dmitry Chaplin (born 1982), Russian-born International Latin dancer
- Geraldine Chaplin (born 1944), American actress, daughter of comedian Charlie Chaplin
- Henry Chaplin, 1st Viscount Chaplin (1840–1923), British politician
- John Chaplin (coach) (born 1937), athletics coach at Washington State University
- John Worthy Chaplin (1840–1920), English recipient of the Victoria Cross
- Josephine Chaplin (born 1949), actress, daughter of comedian Charlie Chaplin
- Judith Chaplin (1939–1993), British politician
- Kate Chaplin (1865–1948), violinist, who with her sisters Nellie Chaplin (1857–1930), pianist, and Mabel Chaplin (1870–1960), cellist, formed the Chaplin Trio
- Kiera Chaplin (born 1982), actress and model, granddaughter of comedian Charlie Chaplin
- Michael Chaplin (actor) (born 1946), actor, son of comedian Charlie Chaplin
- Nikita Chaplin (born 1982), Russian politician
- Oona Chaplin (born 1986), actress, granddaughter of comedian Charlie Chaplin
- Ralph Chaplin (1887–1961), American labor activist
- Saul Chaplin (1912–1997), American composer and musical director
- Shelley Chaplin (born 1984), Australian wheelchair basketball player
- Sid Chaplin (1916–1986), British writer
- Sydney Chaplin (born: Sidney John Hill 1885–1965), elder half-brother of comedian Charlie Chaplin
- Sydney Chaplin (American actor) (1926–2009), American cinema and theatre actor, second son of comedian Charlie Chaplin
- Tom Chaplin (born 1979), lead singer of the English piano rock band, Keane
- Victoria Chaplin (born 1951), actress, daughter of comedian Charlie Chaplin
- Vsevolod Chaplin (1968–2020), Russian Orthodox Church spokesman
- William Chaplin (coach proprietor) (1787–1859), English transport entrepreneur and Member of Parliament for Salisbury (1847–1857)
- William Robert Chaplin, Warden of Trinity House

== See also ==
- Chaplin family, relatives of comedian Charlie Chaplin
- Chaplin (disambiguation)
- Charlin (name)
- Kaplan (surname)
