= Chaplin family =

Multinational acting family

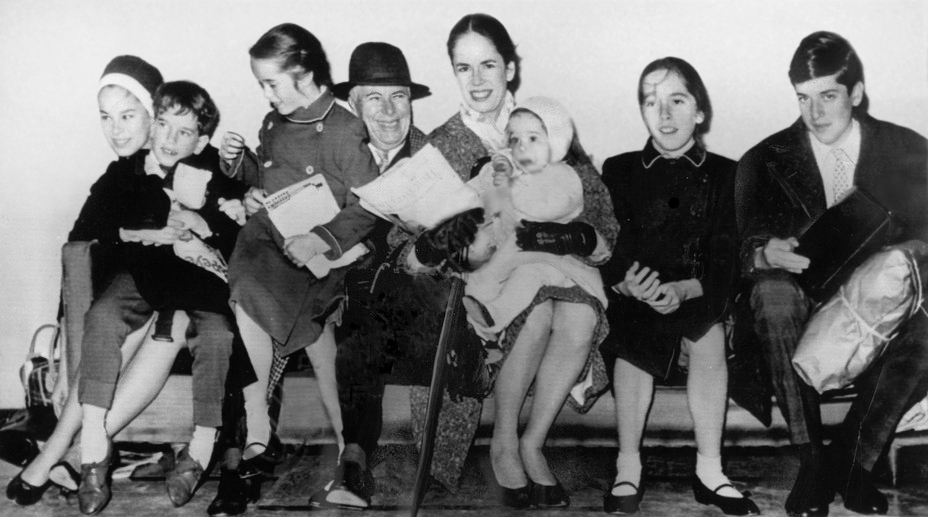
Chaplin family in 1961, From left to right: Geraldine, Eugene, Victoria, Charlie, Oona, Annette, Josephine and Michael Chaplin.

The Chaplin family is an acting family. They are the descendants of Hannah Harriet Pedlingham Hill, mother of Sydney John Chaplin (born Sydney John Hill), Sir Charles Spencer "Charlie" Chaplin Jr., and George Wheeler Dryden.

== Members ==
The members of the Chaplin family include:

- Charles Spencer Chaplin Sr. (1863–1901)
- Hannah Harriet Pedlingham Hill (1865–1928); three sons

- Sydney John Chaplin (1885–1965), born Sydney John Hill; alleged son of Sydney Hawkes; two marriages, no children
- Charles Spencer "Charlie" Chaplin Jr. (1889–1977), son of Charles Spencer Chaplin Sr. (1863–1901); four marriages, six sons, five daughters

(i) Mildred Harris (1901–1944), 1 son

- Norman Spencer Chaplin (1919–1919), died three days after birth

(ii) Lita Grey (1908–1995), two sons

- Charles Spencer Chaplin III (1925–1968)

- Susan Maree Chaplin (born 1959), by Susan Magness; married Scott Newton

- Laurissa Maree Chaplin Newton
- Allison Mary Chaplin Newton
- Tyler David Chaplin Newton
- Casey Jackson Chaplin Newton

- Sydney Earl Chaplin (1926–2009)

- Stéphane C. Chaplin (born 1960), by French dancer and actor Noëlle Adam

- Tamara Chaplin

(iii) Paulette Goddard (1910–1990), no children
(iv) Oona O'Neill (1925–1991), daughter of American playwright Eugene O'Neill and Agnes Boulton; 3 sons, 5 daughters.

- Geraldine Chaplin (born 1944)

- Shane Saura (born 1974), by Carlos Saura
- Oona Castilla Chaplin (born 1986), by Patricio Castilla

- Michael Chaplin (born 1946)

(i) Patricia Johns

- Christian Chaplin (born 1964)
- Tim Chaplin (born 1966)

(ii) Patricia Betaudier

- Dolores Chaplin (born 1971)
- Carmen Chaplin (born 1972)
- Kathleen Chaplin (born 1972)
- Tracy Chaplin (born 1980)
- George Chaplin (born 1985)

- Josephine Chaplin (1949–2023)

- Charly Sistovaris (born 1971), by Nicholas Sistovaris
  - 1 daughter (born 2011)
- Julien Ronet (born 1980), by French actor Maurice Ronet
- Arthur Gardin, by archeologist Jean-Claude Gardin.

- Victoria Chaplin (born 1951), married Jean-Baptiste Thierrée

- Mark Chaplin (born 1971)
- Aurélia Thierrée (born 1971)
- James Thierrée (born 1974)

- Eugene Anthony Chaplin (born 1953)

(i) Bernadette McCready

- Kiera Chaplin (born 1982)
- Laura Chaplin (born 1987)
- Kevin Chaplin
- Spencer Chaplin
- Shannon Chaplin (born 1992)

(ii) Delgermaa Enkhbat

- Oona Chaplin (2007)
- Skye Chaplin (2007)

- Jane Cecil Chaplin (born 1957), married film producer Ilya Salkind

- Orson Chaplin-Salkind (born 1986)

- Luella Chaplin-Salkind

- Osceola Salkind (born 1994)

- Annette (aka Annie) Emily Chaplin (born 1959)
- Christopher Chaplin (born 1962)

- George Wheeler Dryden (1892–1957), half-brother of Charlie Chaplin, son of Leo Dryden and Hannah Chaplin (née Hill); married ballerina Alice Chapple; 1 son

- Spencer Dryden (1938–2005), musician with Jefferson Airplane. He had 5 grandchildren, Aaron, Lauren, Christen, Meagan, and Jessica Dryden, and 3 sons

- Jeffrey Michael Dryden (born 1966) by Jeannie Davis
- Jesse Wheeler Dryden (stage name: Drunkfux) by Sally Mann
- Jackson Dryden by Kathy Miller

== See also ==
- List of entertainment industry dynasties
