= Charles Chaplin (disambiguation) =

Charlie Chaplin (1889–1977) was an English comedy actor.

Charles or Charlie Chaplin may also refer to:

- Charles Chaplin (elder) (1759–1816), British member of parliament for Lincolnshire 1802–1816
- Charles Chaplin (younger) (1786–1859), British member of parliament for Stamford 1809–1812, and for Lincolnshire 1818–1831
- Charles Joshua Chaplin (1825–1891), French painter
- Charles Chaplin Sr. (1863–1901), British music hall performer, father of Charlie Chaplin
- Charles Chaplin (artist) (1907–1987), English artist, engraver and printmaker
- Charles Chaplin Jr. (1925–1968), American actor, son of Charlie Chaplin
- Charlie Chaplin (singer), stage name for Jamaican dancehall and ragga singer Richard Patrick Bennett
- Charles C. G. Chaplin (1906–1991), American ichthyologist and author
- Raj Kapoor (1924–1988), Indian actor and filmmaker, known as the "Charlie Chaplin of India" for his portrayal of Chaplinesque tramp like characters

== Other uses ==
- "Charlie Chaplin went to France", a skipping song
- "Charlie Chaplin", Swedish song performed by Eva Rydberg at the Melodifestivalen 1977
- "Charlie Chaplin" (song), 1978 Greek Eurovision Song Contest Entry sung by Tania Tsanaklidou
- Charlie Chaplin (1999 film), Indian Malayalam-language film
- Charlie Chaplin (2002 film), Indian Tamil-language comedy film by Sakthi Chidambaram, starring Prabhu and Prabhu Deva
  - Charlie Chaplin 2, a 2019 sequel to the 2002 film

== See also ==
- Chaplin (disambiguation)
- Chaplin (name)
- Chaplin family for relatives of comedy actor Charlie Chaplin
- Charles Champlin (1926–2014), American film critic and writer
