= John Chaplin =

John Chaplin may refer to:

- John Chaplin (coach), American track and field athlete and coach
- Jack Chaplin (1882–1951), Scottish association football coach
- Sir John Chaplin (died 1730), of the Chaplin baronets
- John Worthy Chaplin (1840–1920), English recipient of the Victoria Cross

== See also ==
- Chaplin (surname)
