= Hannah Chaplin =

English stage and musical actress

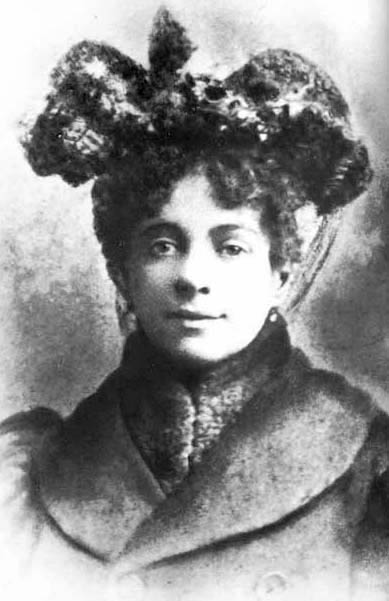
- Hannah Chaplin c. 1885
- Born: Hannah Harriet Pedlingham Hill; 6 August 1865; London, England
- Died: 28 August 1928 (aged 63); Glendale, California, U.S.
- Resting place: Hollywood Forever Cemetery, Los Angeles, California, U.S.
- Other names: Hannah Hill; Hannah Hill Chaplin; Lily Harley
- Occupations: Actress; singer; dancer
- Years active: 1881–1894
- Spouse: Charles Chaplin Sr. (m. 1885; died 1901)
- Partner: Leo Dryden (1892–1893)
- Children: Sydney; Charlie; Wheeler Dryden
- Parents: Charles Frederick Hill (father); Mary Ann Hodges (mother)
- Relatives: See Chaplin family

Hannah Harriet Pedlingham Chaplin (née Hill; 6 August 1865 – 28 August 1928), also known by the stage name Lily Harley, was an English actress, singer and dancer who performed in British music halls from the age of 16.

Chaplin was the mother of actor and filmmaker Charlie Chaplin and his two half-brothers, the actor Sydney Chaplin and the film director Wheeler Dryden, and grandmother of Jefferson Airplane drummer and songwriter Spencer Dryden. As a result of mental illness, now thought to have been caused by syphilis, she was unable to continue performing from the mid-1890s. In 1921, she was relocated by her son Charlie to California, where she was cared for in a house in the San Fernando Valley until her death in August 1928.

== Early life ==
Hannah Chaplin was born on 6 August 1865 at 11 Camden Street in the London district of Walworth. Her father, Charles Frederick Hill, the son of a bricklayer, was a shoemaker. Her mother, Mary Ann Hodges, the daughter of a mercantile clerk, had previously been married to a sign writer who had died in an accident.

== Acting career ==
At the age of 16, Chaplin left home to improve her fortunes by becoming an actress. Inspired by Lillie Langtry, one of the most successful female performers of the time, she adopted the stage name Lily Harley, performing as an actress and singer in the music halls. While taking part in an Irish sketch Shamus O'Brien in the early 1880s, she fell for her stage partner Charles Chaplin Sr, attracted by his charm and good looks. Reflecting on this period, Charlie Chaplin described his mother as "divine-looking". He was later told that she had been "dainty and attractive and had compelling charm".

In about 1883, at approximately 18 years, she became involved with Sydney Hawkes (possibly Sidney Hawke), who took her to the South African gold-mining district of Witwatersrand, where, according to the psychiatrist Stephen Weissman in his 2008 book Chaplin: A Life, she was forced into prostitution. In 1884, pregnant by Hawkes, she returned to London, where she again lived together with Charles Chaplin. In 1885, she gave birth to Sydney, Hawkes' son, and soon returned to the stage, performing at the Royal Music Hall in the northern French city of Le Havre.

She married Charles on 22 June 1885 at St John's Church, Walworth. While there is little record of performances by Charles in the mid-1880s, Hannah Chaplin appeared in Bristol and Dublin in 1885, and in Belfast, Glasgow, Peckham, Aberdeen and Dundee in 1886. Press notices referred to her as "the refined and talented artist Lily Harley" who had been "a most brilliant hit at Gaity and Star, Glasgow, four and five turns every night and heaps of flowers".

== Onset of poor health ==
At the beginning of 1887, Chaplin was back in London, where she first commented on her poor state of health. She appeared with her husband that year in Bath and at music halls in the north of England. Despite her illness, she continued to perform in 1888. Her husband became increasingly popular, yet she did not progress in her career.

On 16 April 1889, she gave birth to a second son, Charles Spencer Chaplin, now better known as Charlie Chaplin. Hannah's relationship with her husband began to deteriorate, possibly as a result of his drinking or of his touring in North America during the summer of 1890.

In the early 1890s, Chaplin became involved with another music hall performer, Leo Dryden, with whom she performed for a short period. On 31 August 1892, her third son, Wheeler Dryden, was born and for a time the family seems to have lived comfortably in West Square, Southwark. In the spring of 1893, however, Dryden left, taking his son with him.

In the early 1890s, it appears that Chaplin spent time with her sister Kate, also a music hall artist, known on stage as Kitty Fairdale. It appears the two sisters lived together around 1892. Chaplin wrote a number of successful songs for her, including "My Lady Friend" and, in particular, "The Lady Judge" which proved to be quite a success from 1893 to 1896.

Chaplin's health steadily worsened as she began to suffer from violent headaches. Her condition deteriorated further when her mother was committed to the London County Asylum after alleged signs of madness, perhaps brought about by drink. Hannah Chaplin appears to have joined the Vaudeville corps de ballet at London's Empire Theatre for a time, possibly to nurse her voice. Little is known of her life between 1892 and 1895. There is nevertheless a clear record of the night in 1894 when she lost her voice while performing at the Canteen in Aldershot. Her son Charlie, five years old at the time, sang in her place.

Unable to perform on the stage, Chaplin supported her two remaining children by dress-making at home. Charlie Chaplin's biography and other sources report that she was frequently in good spirits, entertaining the children with performances of her earlier stage acts or devising stories herself in the pantomime style. Her headaches continued, becoming so serious that on 29 June 1895, she was admitted to the Lambeth Infirmary where she spent the next month and was readmitted a few months later. The children had to leave home, Charlie eventually ending up in an orphanage.

According to Weissman, who investigated Hannah Chaplin's medical records, she had syphilis. Documents from 1898 state that she was prone to violent psychotic episodes, which are a sign of nervous involvement during the tertiary stage of the disease. Her condition deteriorated so much that when she was 35, she had to be admitted to the Cane Hill Asylum on 15 September 1898. On her release, she lived together with her sons in an inexpensive room in Kennington. She continued to work as a seamstress and also benefited from some assistance from Charlie's father until he died of cirrhosis of the liver at age 38. Hannah Chaplin was readmitted to Cane Hill two years later on 9 May 1903, where she continued to experience serious signs of syphilis.

== Final years ==
When her son Charlie reached the age of 14, his career began to evolve. His half-brother Sydney assisted him in finding work through theatrical agencies. They were soon in a position to assist their mother again, bringing her back home. Her reprieve did not last, as she was soon sent back to hospital after being found wandering the streets. By the time he was 21, Charlie had earned enough from his performances to travel to the United States where, by 1921, he had become very wealthy by virtue of being one of the film industry's highest-grossing stars. His mother's health deteriorated further into a state of dementia. Desperate to see her, he brought her to Hollywood where he was now living with Sydney and his other half-brother, Wheeler Dryden.

There, her sons ensured Hannah Chaplin received round-the-clock care in the new home they had found for her in the San Fernando Valley, California. Seven years later she died in hospital in Glendale, California, on 28 August 1928, with Charlie at her side. She is buried in Hollywood Forever Cemetery.

== In popular culture ==
- English model, actress and singer Twiggy portrayed Hannah in the U.K. TV series Young Charlie Chaplin (1989).
- Hannah Chaplin's granddaughter, actress Geraldine Chaplin, portrayed her in the biographical film Chaplin (1992), directed by Richard Attenborough and starring Robert Downey Jr. as Charlie Chaplin. Geraldine Chaplin was nominated for a Golden Globe award in the category of Best Supporting Actress for her performance.
