= Virginia Gordon =

American model and actress (born 1936)

Playboy centerfold appearance
- January 1959
- Preceded by: Joyce Nizzari
- Succeeded by: Eleanor Bradley

Personal details
- Born: October 28, 1936 (age 89) Chaplin, West Virginia, U.S.
- Height: 5 ft 6 in (1.68 m)

Virginia Gordon (born October 28, 1936, in Chaplin, West Virginia) is an American model and actress. She was Playboy magazine's Playmate of the Month for the January 1959 issue. Her centerfold was photographed by Ron Vogel.

Gordon's most significant film, in terms of cinema history, is 1962's Tonight for Sure, as it marks the directorial debut of Francis Ford Coppola.

== Acting career ==
Gordon's acting roles were confined to appearing, mostly sans wardrobe, in a string of obscure sexploitation films produced for the adults-only grindhouse circuit. Her first three films, Once Upon a Knight (1961), written by Bob Cresse, Surftide 77 (1962), directed by Lee Frost, and Tonight for Sure (1962), directed by Francis Ford Coppola, were standard "nudie cutie" comedies typical of the early sixties.

In 1968, Olympic International (created by the writer-director team of Frost and Cresse) produced the "roughie" thriller The Animal. Gordon has her most substantial and realistic role as a single mother terrorized and turned into an abused sex slave by a psychopath. That same year she starred in another Frost/Cresse film, Hot Spur, a violent roughie western in which her character suffers similar abuse.

Her last two films Acapulco Uncensored and The Muthers (both from 1968) were softcore "nudies" from prolific skinflick director Donald A. Davis.

== Filmography ==
- The Muthers (1968) .... Lois
- Acapulco Uncensored (1968)
- Hot Spur (1968) .... Susan O'Hara
- The Animal (1968) .... Joan Clark
- Tonight for Sure (1962)
- Surftide 77 (1962) .... Vultura
- Once Upon a Knight (1961) .... Lady Lauri

== See also ==
- List of people in Playboy 1953–1959

Virginia Gordon	Eleanor Bradley	Audrey Daston	Nancy Crawford	Cindy Fuller	Marilyn Hanold
Yvette Vickers	Clayre Peters	Marianne Gaba	Elaine Reynolds	Donna Lynn	Ellen Stratton
