= Chaplain (surname) =

Chaplain is also a surname. Notable people with the surname include:

- Jules-Clément Chaplain (1839–1909), French sculptor
- Olivier Chaplain (born 1982), French rugby union player
- Roland Chaplain (born 20th century), English lecturer and author
- Scott Chaplain (born 1983), Scottish footballer

== See also ==
- Chaplain
- Chaplin
