= Vengeance of the Deep =

Vengeance of the Deep may refer to:

- Lovers and Luggers, a 1937 adventure melodrama, retitled Vengeance of the Deep in the US and United Kingdom
- Vengeance of the Deep (1923 film), a 1923 film directed by Barry Barringer
