= Chaplin =

Chaplin may refer to:

== People ==
- Charlie Chaplin (1889–1977), English comedy film actor and director
- Chaplin (name), other people named Chaplin

== Films ==
- Unknown Chaplin (1983)
- Chaplin (film) (1992)
- Chaplin (2011 film), Bengali film starring Rudranil Ghosh

== Stage musicals ==
- Chaplin (1993 musical) (1993), a stage musical with music by Roger Anderson, lyrics by Lee Goldsmith and book by Ernest Kinoy
- Chaplin (2006 musical) (2006), a musical with music and lyrics by Christopher Curtis and a book by Curtis and Thomas Meehan

== Places ==
- Chaplin, Connecticut
- Chaplin, Nelson County, Kentucky
- Chaplin, West Virginia
- Chaplin, Nova Scotia
- Chaplin, Saskatchewan
- Chaplin Lake, lake in Saskatchewan
- Rural Municipality of Chaplin No. 164, Saskatchewan

== Other ==
- Chaplin (magazine), Swedish film magazine published by the Swedish Film Institute from 1959 to 1997

== See also ==
- Chaplain, a member of the clergy; often misspelled "chaplin."
- Chaplain (surname)
