= Josselyn's Wife =

Josselyn's Wife may refer to:

- Josselyn's Wife (1919 film), an American silent drama film
- Josselyn's Wife (1926 film), a silent crime drama
