= The Crucifix of Destiny =

1920 film

- Directed by: R. Dale Armstrong
- Written by: Agnes Parsons
- Produced by: Pandora Productions
- Starring: Wheeler Dryden
- Release date: 1920
- Running time: 15 minutes
- Country: USA
- Language: Silent..English titles

The Crucifix of Destiny is a 1920 silent short semi-religious film written and directed by R. Dale Armstrong (who dedicates it to his late mother) and starring Wheeler Dryden, half-brother of Charlie Chaplin.

Note:...Previously this film was thought to star matinee hero Wallace Reid who does not appear anywhere in the existing print.

== Cast ==
- Signor Antonio Corsi - Father Ferdinand, monk
- Wheeler Dryden - Paul Drummond
- Audrey Chapman - Jean Carroll
- Kitty Bradbury - Jean's mother
