= Michael Chaplin (actor) =

American actor (born 1946)

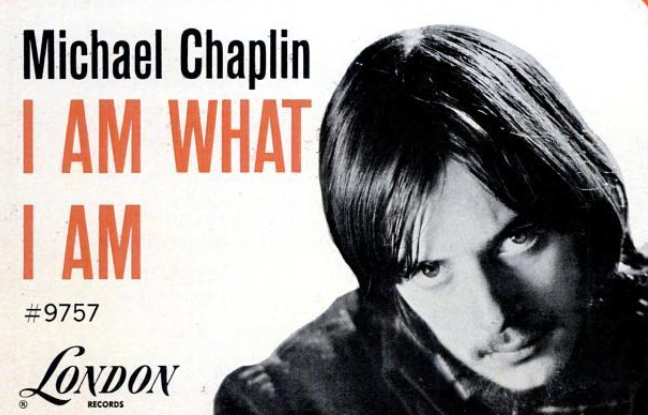
- 1965 trade ad for Michael Chaplin
- Born: Michael John Chaplin; March 7, 1946 (age 80); Santa Monica, California, U.S.
- Education: Royal Academy of Dramatic Art
- Occupations: Actor; writer; producer
- Years active: 1952–1966
- Spouse(s): Patrice Johns (m. 1965; div. 19??); Patricia Betaudier (m. 19??)
- Children: 7, including Carmen Chaplin
- Parent(s): Charlie Chaplin; Oona O'Neill
- Relatives: See Chaplin family
- Website: michaeljchaplin.com

Michael John Chaplin (born March 7, 1946) is an American actor and author born in Santa Monica, California. He is the son of Charlie Chaplin and appeared in two films with him.

== Career ==
Chaplin's started acting at age six, appearing (uncredited) in his father's 1952 film Limelight, and then co-starring alongside him in 1957's A King in New York.

In the mid-1960s Chaplin signed a book contract with British publisher Leslie Frewin to publish his autobiography I Couldn't Smoke The Grass On My Father's Lawn, which was ghostwritten with Tom Merrin and Charles Hamblett. This was a teenage hippie-memoir of drugs and rebellion against a world-famous father. Before its release his father filed an injunction to prevent publication, arguing that it would have a detrimental effect on himself and his family. The injunction was set aside by judges for the Court of Appeal, who held that Chaplin's contract was binding because he stood to gain from the work's publication, as it launched his writing career.

In addition, Chaplin is the author of a novel, A Fallen God, a modern version of the story of Tristan and Iseult. His last part in a film, which was also his first in 48 years, was in the 2014 short film, The Innovators, where he was the voice of the minister.

== Personal life ==
He is the second child and eldest son from Charlie Chaplin's fourth and final marriage, to Oona O'Neill.

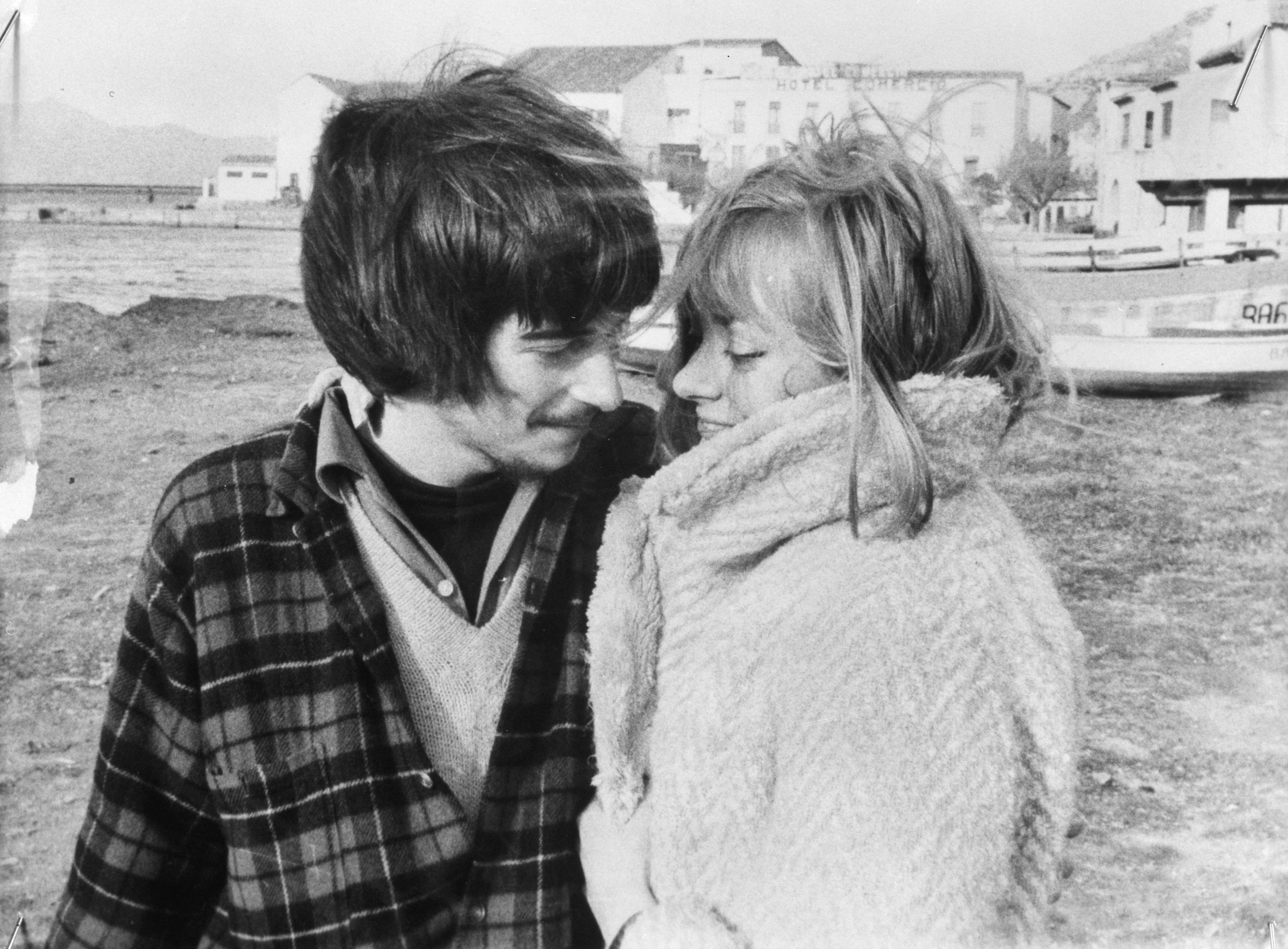
Michael Chaplin and his girlfriend Patrice Johns before their wedding (1965)

He was first married to the writer Patrice Johns, with whom he has two sons including actor Tim Chaplin. He later married Patricia Betaudier, a painter and the daughter of Trinidadian painter Patrick Betaudier. He has five children with her, including actresses Carmen Chaplin and Dolores Chaplin.

== Filmography ==
=== Feature films ===
Year	Title	Role	Notes
1952	Limelight	Child in opening scene	Uncredited; appearance with sisters Geraldine Chaplin and Josephine Chaplin
1957	A King in New York	Rupert Macabee	Co-starred with his father Charlie Chaplin
1966	Promise Her Anything	Heathcliff	Starring Warren Beatty and Leslie Caron
1966	The Sandwich Man	Pavement Artist	Directed by Robert Hartford-Davis
1971	The Legend of Frenchie King	Uncredited	French title: Les Pétroleuses; starring Brigitte Bardot
1989	The Rainbow	Ivan Brangwen	Directed by Ken Russell

=== Short films ===
- 1966: The Same Sky – Narrator / Lead role; Produced during the "Swinging London" period.
- 2014: The Innovators – Voice of the Minister (Short film); Directed by Carmen Zografos.

=== Commercials ===
- 1966: Pepsi-Cola – UK television campaign during the "Pepsi Generation" era.
- 1967: Milk Marketing Board – British television campaign.

=== Documentaries and Home Media ===
Year	Title	Role	Notes
1960	The Ed Sullivan Show	Himself	Guest (Season 13, Episode 28)
2003	Charlie: The Life and Art of Charles Chaplin	Himself	Interviewee regarding the Chaplin family
2004	The Chaplin Collection	Consultant / Himself	Introductions for the Criterion Collection and Warner Home Video DVD releases.
2014	Chaplin, la légende du siècle	Himself	French television documentary
2021	The Real Charlie Chaplin	Himself	Featuring interviews and archive footage

== Music ==
In the mid-1960s, Chaplin pursued a brief career as a pop singer in London and the United States, released under the London Records and Columbia Records labels. His most notable release was the single "I Am What I Am".

- "I Am What I Am" / "Restless" (1965) – Single released on London Records (US, Catalog No. #9757).
- "I Am What I Am" / "Goodbye Stranger" (1966) – Single released on Columbia Records (UK, Catalog No. DB 7935).
- "I Am What I Am" / "Restless" (1966) – Single released on London Records (Brazil, Catalog No. 45-9757).

== Books ==
- I Couldn't Smoke the Grass on My Father's Lawn (1966), co-written with Tom Merrin and Charles Hamblett. London: Frewin. ISBN 9781199507518.
- A Fallen God. Publisher: The Book Guild Ltd, 2024, ISBN 978-1-915853-49-3
