= All About the Benjamins =

- Theatrical release poster
- Directed by: Kevin Bray
- Written by: Ice Cube; Ronald Lang
- Produced by: Matt Alvarez; Ice Cube
- Starring: Ice Cube; Mike Epps; Eva Mendes; Tommy Flanagan
- Cinematography: Glen MacPherson
- Edited by: Suzanne Hines
- Music by: John Murphy
- Production company: Cube Vision Productions
- Distributed by: New Line Cinema
- Release date: March 8, 2002
- Running time: 98 minutes
- Country: United States
- Language: English
- Budget: $14 million
- Box office: $26.3 million

All About the Benjamins is a 2002 American buddy action comedy film directed by Kevin Bray (in his feature directorial debut). The film follows a bounty hunter (Ice Cube, who co-wrote the screenplay) and a con artist (Mike Epps) who join forces to find a group of diamond thieves. The film's title was taken from the popular 1997 hip-hop song performed by Puff Daddy "It's All About the Benjamins". It reunited Cube and Epps from the Friday series.

The film was theatrically released by New Line Cinema on March 8, 2002. The film received negative reviews from critics and grossed $26 million.

== Plot ==
Bucum Jackson, a maverick bounty hunter, is out to capture a petty drug dealer, Lil J. Bucum confronts Lil J in his trailer home and nearly handcuffs him, but Lil J's girlfriend, who wields a shotgun, recklessly shoots at Bucum. Bucum manages to tackle Lil J's girlfriend and arrest Lil J. Bucum's boss Martinez, however, is not pleased with Bucum and pays him less than expected. After a brief conversation about the lottery with his attractive co-worker Pam, Bucum learns from Martinez that he must capture a con man named Reggie Wright, whom Bucum has captured three times prior.

Bucum sees Reggie at a convenience store but fails to catch him after a long chase through Miami. Meanwhile, during a photoshoot, diamond thieves Julian and Ursula are posing as a photographer and model until a Mr. Barkley arrives. The duo murder the co-photographer, the makeup artist and Barkley's bodyguards, much to Barkley's surprise. Barkley is then shot in the head after a brief dialogue with Julian for murdering the witnesses. They then retrieve diamonds from the shoot. Bucum tracks down Reggie again and chases him until he remains unnoticed since he is hidden in a van. The thieves come down, upon running into him instantly by accident, shoots at Bucum, who shoots back in response, and escapes, unbeknownst to them that Reggie is hidden. In a boatyard, the thieves find Reggie in the van and shoot at him when he escapes, leaving his wallet behind, which is picked up by Julian. At the crime scene, Martinez is fed up with Bucum's attempts and orders him to stay away from Reggie.

In Reggie's apartment, Reggie and his girlfriend Gina eventually win the lottery, only to find out that Reggie lost the ticket, which was in Reggie's wallet. In the boatyard, Julian and Ursula are yelled at by their boss Williamson, having told him that the diamonds they retrieved from the shoot were fake. Out of frustration of not getting the diamonds, Williamson responds by shooting Julian in the arm, severely wounding him, which is later enclosed in an arm brace. Reggie is soon captured by Bucum during an attempt to retrieve his wallet and while in the car, Reggie manages to convince Bucum to find his wallet and find the thieves. At the boatyard, Bucum and Reggie realizes that the van is unclear of its location, so Bucum tries to look into the connection of the photo shoot and the van, while Reggie is handcuffed to his bed with Gina. Julian, in a psychopathic state, goes after Reggie. He arrives at the apartment, and is knocked unconscious by Bucum, having anticipated him coming after Reggie. The duo then decides to torture Julian for answers by bending a screwdriver into Julian's arm brace, which can rip through his skin. Julian then reveals Williamson's name. Bucum awaits in the boatyard of Williamson's boat dealership and poses as a customer. This soon fails, so the duo decides to go to the Barkley residence. At the house, they find a dead Mrs. Barkley, a man named Roscoe who was the one who murdered Mrs. Barkley, surprises and knocks out Bucum (only to be knocked out by Reggie), eventually finding the diamonds in a fish tank, and putting Roscoe in the trunk of Bucum's car bound and gagged, along with Julian. They return to Bucum's apartment and discover that Williamson has kidnapped Gina.

In response, they roll a car into Williamson's boat dealership with Julian and Roscoe unconscious in the cab. Willamson finds a tape recorder that informs him to meet Reggie and Bucum at a dog track with Gina to exchange for the diamonds. This goes successful with Pam posing as a janitor, Reggie revealing the diamonds, and Bucum taking position as sniper in a dog tracksman disguise to take out a sniper working for Williamson until Reggie flips the diamonds off of Williamson's hands leading to a shootout and chase. During the chase, Williamson pulls out a bazooka and opens fire, missing Bucum, Reggie, Gina and Pam but instead blowing up a nearby fish truck. He escapes, and Bucum and Reggie are so fed up with the plan that they decide to break up their partnership. Pam convinces Bucum to talk to Reggie and they make up again. The duo tracks Williamson to a boat dock in which Gina and Pam await behind them in the car. Bucum gives Reggie a taser since Reggie accidentally dropped one of Bucum's guns into the ocean. On the boat, as Bucum leaves, he sees Pam and Gina running away, having knocked out two henchmen by pushing a lifeboat in their direction. Meanwhile, Reggie finds his wallet and recovers the lottery ticket, but is soon caught by Williamson and Ursula and he even forces Reggie to take his money on the boat. Bucum, taking Ursula as a hostage, catches up with them. Williamson, in response, kills Ursula by shooting her in the head and wounds Reggie, leading to a fight as the boat speeds up. Williamson is knocked out by the boat's speed and the boat crashes onto shore. Bucum and Reggie reunite until Williamson, badly injured, attacks Bucum. Reggie tases him and Bucum shoots Williamson to death multiple times. Later, Bucum and Reggie are figuring out what to do next, things take a turn when Bucum sees the coast guards arriving in the distance, and Bucum is forced to handcuff Reggie to turn him in, letting him know he only has a warrant and won’t be in prison that long. He also hides the money.

Six weeks later, Reggie is released from prison. He initially believes that his friends have abandoned him until Bucum finally arrives, along with Gina and Pam. Bucum, who has a new car and spending money, reveals the winning ticket. The film ends with Reggie celebrating his new wealth with Bucum, their women, and the two elderly friends of Reggie, skiing on the boat through the ocean.

== Cast ==
- Ice Cube as Bucum Jackson, a bounty hunter who has a hatred for his job due to low-budget payment and teams up with Reggie, eventually befriending him.
- Mike Epps as Reginald "Reggie" Wright, a con artist who teams with Bucum.
- Eva Mendes as Gina, Reggie's girlfriend.
- Tommy Flanagan as Robert Williamson, a speed boat dealership owner who wants the diamonds in exchange for money and the main antagonist.
- Carmen Chaplin as Ursula, a diamond thief working for Williamson and also his lover.
- Anthony Giaimo as Martinez, Bucum's boss.
- Robert MacBeth as Mr. Dwight Shelton, a local store owner who shows great annoyance of Reggie.
- Valarie Rae Miller as Pam, Bucum's girlfriend who is also his co-worker.
- Roger Guenveur Smith as Julian Ramose, a diamond thief working for Williamson.
- Bob Carter as Mr. Barkley, a wealthy man who has a batch of diamonds, wanted by Williamson.
- Bow Wow as Kelly, a neighbor of Reggie.
- Anthony Michael Hall as "Lil J", a con artist who is arrested by Bucum.
- Oscar Isaac as Francesco, Julian's camera assistant.
- Barbara Barron as Mrs. Barkley, the wife of Mr. Barkley.

== Production ==
The film was announced in January 2001, the first move of Toby Emmerich's term as the head of New Line Cinema. Mike Epps had originally acquired the script, written by Ronald Lang, and Ice Cube then did a rewrite; he said 60% of the final film was scripted and the rest was improve. The film shot around Miami on a $14 million budget.

== Reception ==
On Rotten Tomatoes, it has an approval rating of 31% based on 74 reviews. The site's critics consensus reads: "A sloppy, poorly directed action-comedy, All About the Benjamins is too derivative and gratuitously violent." On Metacritic, the film has a weighted average score of 34 out of 100 based on 26 critics, indicating "generally unfavorable reviews". Audiences polled by CinemaScore gave the film an average grade of "A–" on an A+ to F scale.

Ed Gonzalez of Slant Magazine wrote that: "[T]he film simultaneously embraces and rejects the dog-whistle vaudeville of Rush Hour and the testosterone overload of Bad Boys, and the result is an absurd, sometimes elegant look at cultural emancipation via the buck." Entertainment Weekly's Lisa Schwarzbaum gave the movie an overall C− grade, writing that: "I don't know if Cube is melting as he warms up his persona to be all things to all audiences — tough but tender, rap-real but corporate-ready — or if Epps' off-spin, discount-Tucker prattle is slowing Cube's game. But something puddles to nothing in this relentless Miami sun." Russell Smith of The Austin Chronicle criticized the film for being "another slice off the increasingly stale buddy-pic loaf" that came after 48 Hrs., highlighting the "random disconnectedness" of the action scenes as "downright insulting" and the nasty violence for coming across as "benignly cartoonish silliness".

== Soundtrack ==
A soundtrack containing hip hop and rhythm and blues music was released on February 19, 2002 by New Line Records. It peaked at #65 on the Billboard 200 and #12 on the Top R&B/Hip-Hop Albums.
