= Joyce Nizzari =

American model, dancer, and actress (born 1940)

Playboy centerfold appearance
- December 1958
- Preceded by: Joan Staley
- Succeeded by: Virginia Gordon

Personal details
- Born: May 20, 1940 (age 85) The Bronx, New York, U.S.
- Height: 5 ft 6 in (1.68 m)

Joyce Nizzari (born May 20, 1940) is an American model, dancer, and actress. She was Playboy magazine's Playmate of the Month for its December 1958 issue. Her centerfold was photographed by Bunny Yeager. She was born in The Bronx, New York and is of Italian descent.

== Model career ==
Yeager discovered Nizzari in Miami when she was 15, but only had her do bikini shots until after Joyce turned 18. In August 1957, Nizzari won a cup awarded by the Florida Photographers Association. She was chosen queen of its annual convention.

She dated Hugh Hefner for a few years following her Playmate appearance, and she worked as a Bunny at the first Playboy Club in Chicago. In the late 1990s, Joyce returned to the Playboy fold full-time as one of Hefner's assistants in the Playboy Mansion.

== Film actress ==
Nizzari appears in two films starring Frank Sinatra: A Hole In The Head (1959) and Come Blow Your Horn (1963). In the latter, a Paramount Pictures release, she played a zany interpretive dancer named Snow. When she signed to play in Come Blow Your Horn, Nizzari had completed Chips Off the Old Block, a Barry Ashton dance revue, at the Statler Hilton in Los Angeles. She also played a bit part in the slapstick comedy The Great Race with Jack Lemmon and Tony Curtis.

== Marriage ==
Nizzari was married to character actor Jack Hogan.

== Filmography ==
- Green Acres - "Eb Discovers the Birds and the Bees" (1966) as Cigarette Girl
- Petticoat Junction - The Windfall (1966) as Hat Check Girl
- The Beverly Hillbillies
  - "Brewster's Baby" (1966) as Kitty Kat Showgirl
  - "Clampett's Millions" (1965) as Mabel Slocum
  - "Double Naught Jethro" (1965) as Mabel Slocum
- The Great Race (1965) (uncredited) as Woman in West
- Burke's Law
  - "Who Killed the Grand Piano?" (1965) as Bunny #2, 'Tammy'
  - "Who Killed Hamlet?" (1965) as 1st Girl at Bar
  - "Who Killed Molly?" (1964) as Molly Baker
- Pajama Party (1964) as Pajama Girl
- Seven Days in May (1964) (uncredited)
- The Candidate (1964) as Party Girl
- Come Blow Your Horn (1963) as Snow Eskanazi
- Playboy's Penthouse - Episode dated October 24, 1959 (1959)
- A Hole in the Head (1959) as Alice (Jerry's secretary)
- The Wild Women of Wongo (1958) as Woman of Wongo

== See also ==
- List of people in Playboy 1953–1959

Elizabeth Ann Roberts	Cheryl Kubert	Zahra Norbo	Felicia Atkins	Lari Laine	Judy Lee Tomerlin
Linné Ahlstrand	Myrna Weber	Teri Hope	Mara Corday, Pat Sheehan	Joan Staley	Joyce Nizzari
