= Wreckage (film) =

1925 silent film

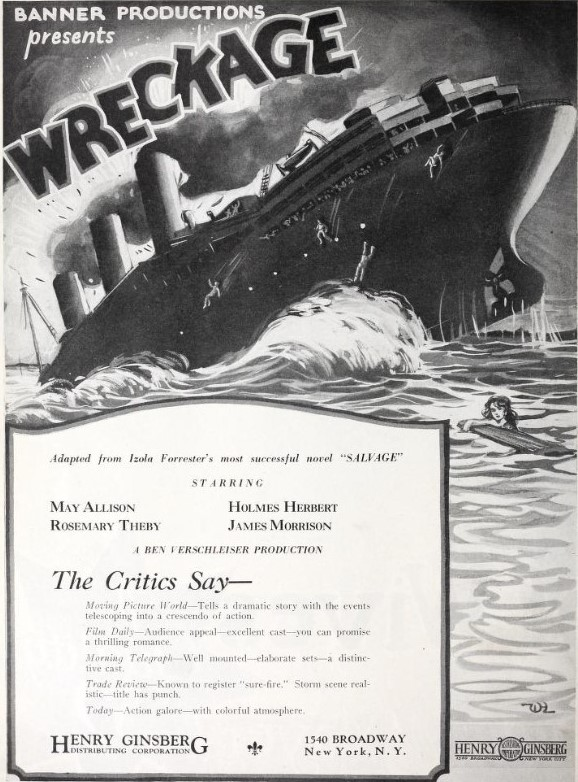
- Advertisement
- Directed by: Scott R. Dunlap
- Written by: Fanny Hatton; Frederic Hatton; Agnes Parsons
- Based on: Salvage by Izola Forrester
- Produced by: Ben Verschleiser
- Starring: May Allison; Holmes Herbert; John Miljan
- Cinematography: King D. Gray; Conrad Wells
- Production company: Banner Productions
- Distributed by: Henry Ginsberg Distributing Company; Wardour Films (UK)
- Release date: September 12, 1925
- Running time: 60 minutes
- Country: United States
- Language: Silent (English intertitles)

Wreckage is a 1925 American silent drama film directed by Scott R. Dunlap and starring May Allison, Holmes Herbert, and John Miljan.

== Cast ==
- May Allison as Rene
- Holmes Herbert as Stuart Ames
- John Miljan as Maurice Dysart
- Rosemary Theby as Margot
- James W. Morrison as Grant Demarest

== Preservation status ==
- The film survives in George Eastman Archives and UCLA Film and Television Arcives.

== Bibliography ==
- Goble, Alan. The Complete Index to Literary Sources in Film. Walter de Gruyter, 1999.
