= The Fast Mail =

1922 film

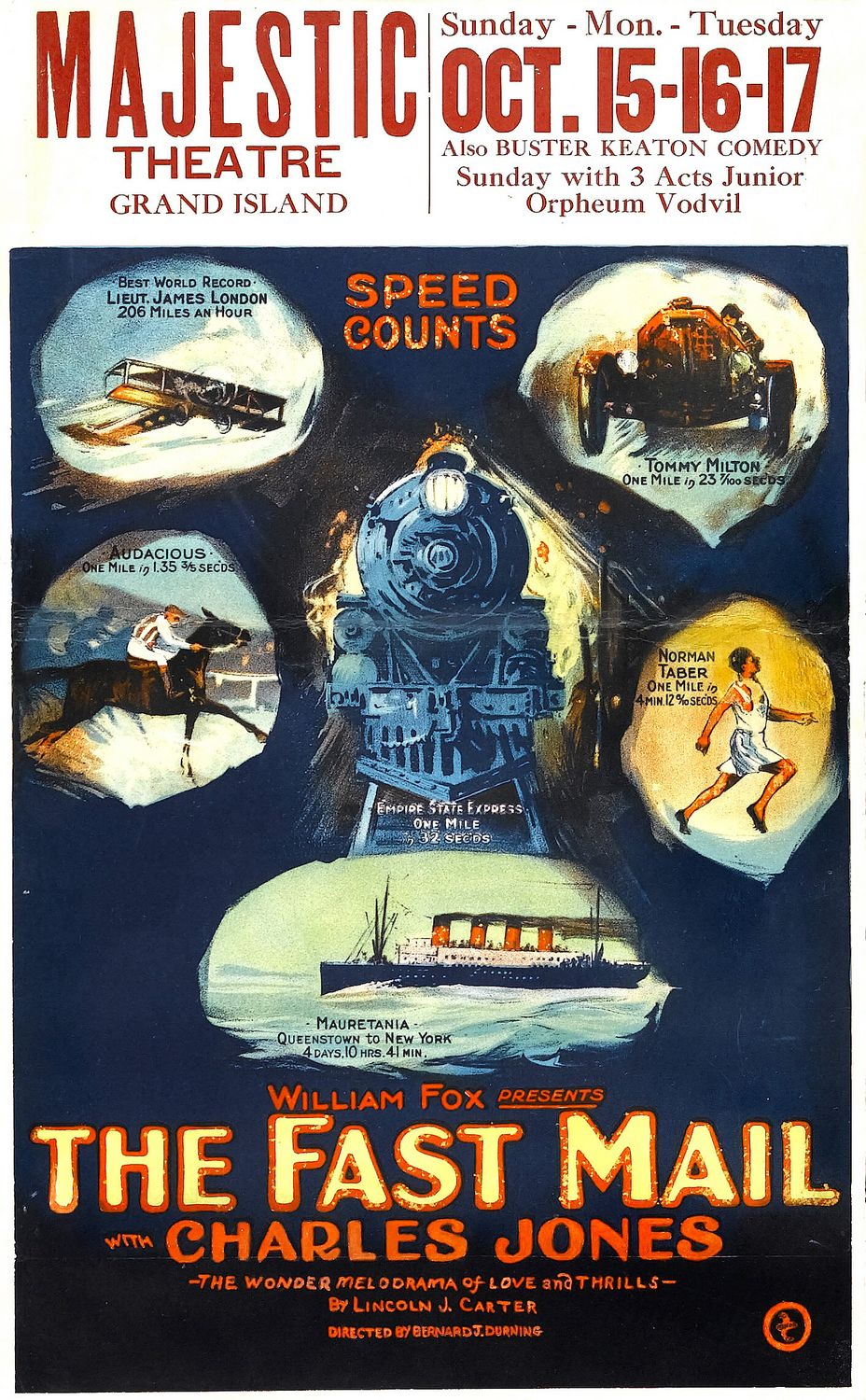
- Fox poster for the film depicting fastest in entertainment and technology speed being emblematic of the mail service: Lt. James London, fastest airplane speed. Audacious fastest horse. Empire State Express fastest passenger train. Tommy Milton record holding race car driver. Norman Taber fastest runner. RMS Mauretania fastest Atlantic crossing.
- Directed by: Bernard J. Durning
- Written by: Jacques Jaccard; Agnes Parsons
- Based on: play, The Fast Mail, by Lincoln J. Carter
- Produced by: William Fox
- Starring: Buck Jones; Eileen Percy
- Cinematography: George Schneiderman; Don Short
- Distributed by: Fox Film Corporation
- Release date: August 20, 1922
- Running time: 6 reels
- Country: United States
- Language: Silent (English intertitles)

The Fast Mail is a 1922 American silent melodrama film directed by Bernard J. Durning and starring Buck Jones (credited as Charles Jones) and Eileen Percy. It was produced and distributed by the Fox Film Corporation. It was adapted for the screen by Agnes Parsons and Jacques Jaccard from a previously unpublished play of the same name by Lincoln J. Carter.

== Cast ==
- Buck Jones as Stanley Carson
- Eileen Percy as Virginia Martin
- James "Jim" Mason as Lee Mason
- William Steele as Pierre La Fitte
- Adolphe Menjou as Cal Baldwin
- Harry Dunkinson as Harry Joyce

== Preservation ==
The Fast Mail is currently presumed lost. In February of 2021, the film was cited by the National Film Preservation Board on their Lost U.S. Silent Feature Films list.

== See also ==
- 1937 Fox vault fire
- List of lost films
