= Agnes Parsons =

American screenwriter

- Born: Jenny Lind Parsons; January 4, 1884; Burlington, Iowa, U.S.
- Died: December 7, 1970 (aged 86); Los Angeles, California, U.S.
- Occupation: Screenwriter
- Years active: 1920–1927

Agnes Parsons (born Jenny Lind Parsons: January 4, 1884 – December 7, 1970) was an American screenwriter active during Hollywood's silent era. She also taught and wrote about writing after she stopped writing for the silver screen.

== Biography ==
Agnes was born in Burlington, Iowa, to William Parsons and Grace Priddy. She moved to Oregon as a young woman before moving to Los Angeles. By 1917, she was working as a scenario writer for Cecil B. deMille's studio, although she wasn't credited on her earliest scripts. Her first known credit was on 1920's The Crucifix of Destiny. After she stopped writing screenplays in the early 1930s, she worked as a teacher. Agnes died on December 7, 1970, in Los Angeles.

== Selected filmography ==
- Jewels of Desire (1927)
- Josselyn's Wife (1926)
- Wreckage (1925)
- Vengeance of the Deep (1923)
- The Fast Mail (1922)
- Chain Lightning (1922)
- Riding with Death (1921)
- Rip Van Winkle (1921)
- The Crucifix of Destiny (1920)
