= Aurélia Thierrée =

French actress

Aurélia Clementine Oona Moorine Hannah Madeleine Thierrée (born 24 September 1971 in Montpellier, France) is a French actress, dancer, and circus performer.

== Biography ==
Thierrée is the daughter of Victoria Chaplin and Jean-Baptiste Thierrée and the sister of James Thierrée. She is also the granddaughter of Charlie Chaplin and Oona O'Neill. Her first cousins are fellow actresses Carmen, Kiera, and Oona Chaplin. She grew up in her parents circus. The imaginary circus and the invisible circus. In the early 2000’s, she toured “Aurelia s Oratorio” around the world. Then Murmurs and Bells and spells. Three shows she created along with her mother Victoria Thierrée Chaplin.

== Filmography ==
- Hydrolution (1988)
- À la belle étoile (1993)
- La Belle Verte (1996)
- The People vs. Larry Flynt (1996)
- Sentimental Education (1998)
- Far from China (2001)
- Rien, voilà l'ordre (2003)
- Goya's Ghosts (2006)
- The Favor (2006)
- 24 Bars (2007)
- The Farewell (2011)
- Valley of Love (2015)
- Wetware (2018)
- Twice Upon a Time (2019)
- ’’Robuste (film) (2021)
- ’’ La Petite (film)(2023)
