= Jewels of Desire =

1927 film by Paul Powell

- Directed by: Paul Powell
- Written by: Anthony Coldeway
- Story by: Agnes Parsons
- Produced by: John C. Flinn
- Starring: Priscilla Dean; John Bowers
- Cinematography: Georges Benoit
- Distributed by: Producers Distributing Corporation
- Release date: January 3, 1927
- Running time: 6 reels
- Country: USA
- Language: Silent film(English intertitles)

Jewels of Desire is a 1927 silent film directed by Paul Powell and starring Priscilla Dean. It was released through Producers Distributing Corporation.

A print is preserved at the UCLA Film and Television Archive.

== Cast ==
- Priscilla Dean - Margarita Solano
- John Bowers - Maclyn Mills
- Walter Long - Pedro
- Luke Cosgrove - Captain Blunt
- Syd Crossley - Taxi driver
- Ernie Adams - The Rat
- Raymond Wells - Spanish Joe
- Marie Percivale - Old Indian Woman
