= Leo Dryden =

British singer (1863–1939)

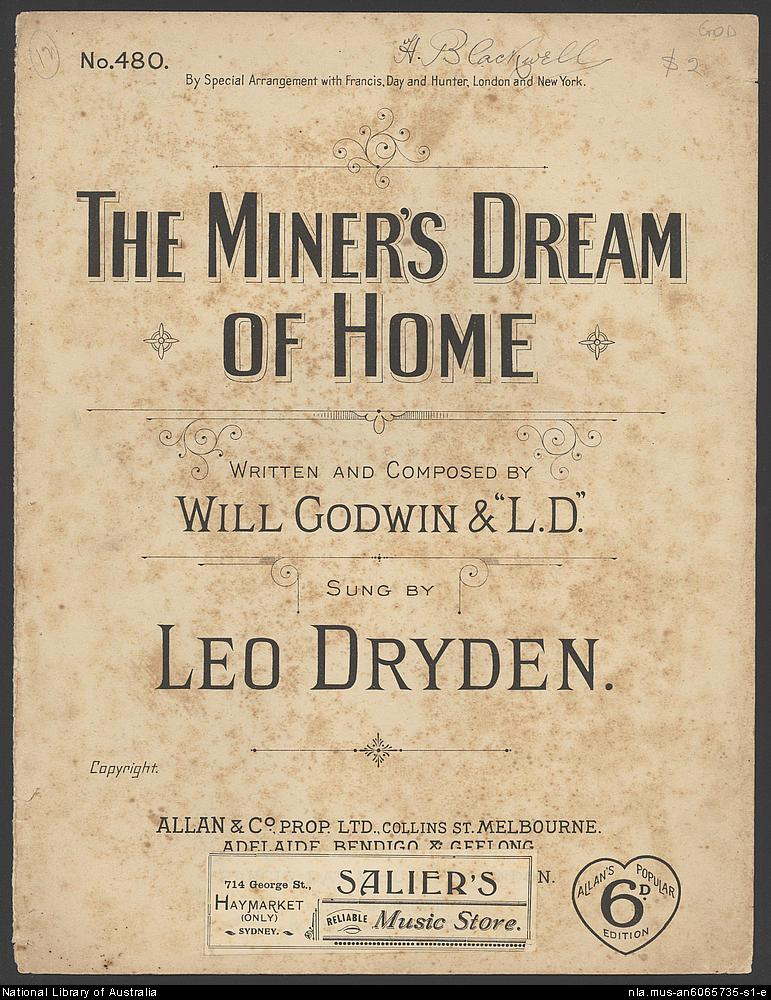
- 1890 Sheet music
- Born: George Dryden Wheeler; 6 June 1863; London, England
- Died: 21 April 1939 (aged 75); London, England
- Occupation: Music hall vocal comic
- Spouse: Marie Tyler (m. 1897)
- Partner: Hannah Chaplin (1892–1893)
- Children: Wheeler Dryden
- Relatives: Spencer Dryden (grandson)

George Dryden Wheeler Sr. (6 June 1863 – 21 April 1939), known as Leo Dryden, was an English music hall singer and vocal comic.

== Life and career ==
George Dryden Wheeler, known as Leo Dryden, was born in London, the son of Sarah Ann (Frost) and George Kingman Wheeler.

Leo Dryden became a music hall entertainer, and was best known as the Kipling of the Halls, noted for his patriotic and colonial songs including "The Miner's Dream of Home" (1891).

=== Marriage and family ===
In 1892, he met Hannah Chaplin (stage name Lily Harley) also a music hall performer. They had an affair and a son, George Dryden Wheeler Jr, which resulted in the breakdown of her marriage to Charles Chaplin Sr. (She had already had a son with her husband, who later became known as actor and director Charlie Chaplin) The couple split up and Dryden kept his son because of Hannah's mental instability.

Hannah suffered bouts of mental illness and was committed to the Cane Hill Asylum at Coulsdon. This marked the end of her career and the start of a long decline. She was not reunited with her son Wheeler until 1918, when he joined her and her older two sons, his half-brothers, in the United States. Charlie Chaplin was beginning his film career in Hollywood.

In 1897, Leo Dryden married singer Marie Tyler (real name Marian Louise Crutchlow) in London. His son Wheeler also became an entertainer, even touring in India in 1915.

=== Career ===
Dryden also performed parodies, including "Shopmates" and one on "Funiculì Funiculà". He dressed to fit the songs, as a Canadian Indian for "The Great Mother", as an Indian soldier for "India's Reply", and "How India Kept Her Word" (1898). Even America did not escape, with "America Looking On", about the Boer War.

These examples of colonial fealty were well received by British audiences, and were parodied in Rudyard Kipling's Barrack-Room Ballads. Dryden also was known for performing tear-jerking ballads, such as "Don't Go Down the Mine, Dad" (1910), possibly inspired by the great 1907 mining disaster at St. Genard in South Wales, and "Good-bye, Mary!" (1911).

At the start of World War I, Dryden returned to patriotic songs with "Call Us and We’ll Soon Be There" (1914).

Dryden also appeared in The Lady of the Lake (1925), an early sound film inspired by the Walter Scott poem.

With the music halls in decline by the 1930s, and his son having joined his Chaplin half-brothers in America, Leo Dryden was reduced to busking in the streets. He died in London 21 April 1939.

He is the paternal grandfather of rock musician Spencer Dryden, the drummer for Jefferson Airplane.

== "The Miner's Dream of Home" ==
Will Godwin and Leo Dryden wrote The Miner's Dream of Home in 1891. Leo Dryden sang it in the music halls for many years and recorded it on 27 August 1898 on a Berliner disc E2013

Extract:

It is ten weary years since I left England's shore
In a far distant country to roam.
How I long to return to my own native land,
To my friends and the old folks at home.
Last night, as a slumbered, I had a strange dream.
One that seemed to bring distant friends near.
I dreamt of Old England, the land of my birth,
To the heart of her sons ever dear.

Chorus

I saw the old homestead and faces I love
I saw England's valleys and dells.
I listen'd with joy, as I did when a boy
To the sound of the old village bells
The log was burning brightly
'Twas a night that should banish all sin
For the bells were ringing the old year out
And the new year in.
