= Snapshots (2002 film) =

2002 film

- Theatrical release Poster
- Directed by: Rudolf van den Berg
- Written by: Michael O'Loughlin; Rudolf van den Berg
- Produced by: Pierre Spengler
- Starring: Burt Reynolds; Julie Christie
- Cinematography: Gábor Szabó
- Edited by: Kant Pan
- Production companies: Overseas Filmgroup; Cadenza Films
- Distributed by: A-Film Distribution (Netherlands)
- Release date: February 21, 2002
- Running time: 93 minutes
- Countries: Netherlands; United Kingdom; United States
- Language: English
- Budget: $11,000,000

Snapshots is a 2002 Anglo-American-Dutch film directed by Rudolf van den Berg starring Burt Reynolds and Julie Christie. Reynolds and Christie, though top-billed, have less screen time than does Carmen Chaplin, as a young woman on a journey of discovery. Chaplin's story mirrors the relationship between Reynolds and Christie characters in their earlier life, which is told in flashbacks.

== Plot ==
Expatriate American Larry J. Brodsky owns a second-hand bookstore in Amsterdam. When Aïsha, a young woman who looks like Larry's lost love from Morocco, walks into his store, Larry rethinks his life as he remembers his past.

== Cast ==
- Burt Reynolds as Reverend E.F. Bolton
- Julie Christie as Nadine Bolton
- Carmen Chaplin as Aïsha

== Production ==
The working title of the film was The Hermit of Amsterdam. Budgeted at $11 million, Snapshots was filmed in Amsterdam and Haarlem in Noord-Holland in The Netherlands, in Morocco and in Los Angeles.

== Critical response ==
The film "could have been an edgy, psychosexual indie drama" with better focus on its themes, commented Wayne Byrne in his book about Reynolds. A review in Variety stated that the film's "sheer silliness is ultimately its main appeal, though Burt Reynolds fans may get some kinky pleasure out of hearing thesp quote Ezra Pound in his second-hand bookstore overlooking a scenic Dutch canal."
