= Escape to the Sun =

1972 film

- Directed by: Menahem Golan
- Written by: Menahem Golan
- Produced by: Menahem Golan
- Starring: Laurence Harvey; Yehuda Barkan; Josephine Chaplin; Jack Hawkins
- Cinematography: David Gurfinkel
- Edited by: Alfred Srp
- Music by: Dov Seltzer
- Production companies: Comacico; Noah Films
- Distributed by: Cinevision (U.S.)
- Release date: 31 October 1972 (U.S.)
- Running time: 118 minutes
- Countries: France; Israel
- Language: English

Escape to the Sun is a 1972 drama film written, produced, and directed by Menahem Golan and starring Laurence Harvey, Josephine Chaplin, John Ireland, Lila Kedrova and Jack Hawkins. The film was a co-production of Israel, France and West Germany.

The screenplay was written by Menahem Golan and Yosef Gross, based on a short story by Uri Dan. The plot centers around a group of Jews attempting to hijack a plane to escape from a police state. The country's name is not mentioned in the film, but it is clear that it refers to the Soviet Union.

The storyline is inspired by Operation Wedding, a documentary about the Dymshits–Kuznetsov hijacking affair, when a group of Jews, including refusal-to-emigrate individuals and human rights activists in the Soviet Union hijack an empty civilian plane on 15 June 1970. However, the resemblance between the two is minimal.

The film was shot in West Berlin and Norway.

== Plot ==
A group of people wish to flee the Soviet Union to escape anti-semitism and political repression, but their activities soon attract the attention of the KGB secret police.

Yasha Barazov is an outstanding Jewish medical student nearing the completion of his studies. He faces antisemitism at the university, primarily from the student Grisha, and therefore requests permission to immigrate to the United States, where his mother lives. As a result, he is expelled from the university, and even his landlady kicks him out.

Yasha is engaged to Nina Kaplan, who lives with her mother Sarah. Sarah spent 10 years in exile in Siberia, where her husband disappeared. Both Nina and Sarah have applied for immigration.

Major Kirsonov is a senior investigator working to reject their immigration requests.

Yasha meets at the house of the banned writer Alexei Baburin, whose books are distributed in the West but banned in his own country. Present at the meeting are also scientist Professor Abramovich and former pilot Kagan. Kagan was a decorated combat pilot but was dismissed after requesting to emigrate.

All these meetings are being monitored by Kirsonov's secret police. The group is joined by the Jewish photographer Romik, who was once an informant for the police. He is arrested and subjected to violent interrogation.

Kirsonov falls in love with Nina and seeks to separate her from Yasha. Yasha receives an immigration permit, but the day before, they begin to marry secretly so Nina can later apply for family reunification. They marry in secret and spend the night at the Kaplan apartment, while Sarah spends the night at a tavern with a drunk.

The next day, they say goodbye to Yasha, who boards the plane but is arrested, imprisoned, and tortured to reveal the plans of the group he met. After some time, he is released but is still under surveillance.

The group's plan is for Kagan and Romik to hijack a passenger plane, and Kagan will land it at a specific airport where the escapees will board. The plan is known to the police, and Kagan, who tries to enter the cockpit, is immediately arrested, while Romik commits suicide by shooting himself.

The plane lands, and the police burst in and arrest the group of escapees. Nina and Yasha manage to flee, but Yasha is shot. They continue through the snow toward the border, but Yasha's strength wanes, and he dies in the snow.

The judge accuses the group members of betrayal. Kagan and Abramovich are sentenced to death, Sarah and Mrs. Abramovich are sentenced to ten years of hard labor, and Baburin is sentenced to long-term hospitalization in a psychiatric institution.

== Cast ==
- Laurence Harvey as Major Kirsalov
- Josephine Chaplin as Nina Kaplan
- John Ireland as Jacob Kaplan
- Lila Kedrova as Sarah Kaplan
- Jack Hawkins as Baburin
- Yehuda Barkan as Yasha Bazarov
- Yehuda Efroni as Romek
- Peter Capell as Professor Abramowiz

== Production ==
The film is based on a short story by author Uri Dan, and in turn based loosely on the events of the June 1970 Dymshits–Kuznetsov hijacking affair, in which a group of mostly Jews and two non-Jews unsuccessfully attempted to steal a Soviet airplane and fly it to freedom.
