= A King in New York =

1957 British film by Charlie Chaplin

- Theatrical release poster
- Directed by: Charlie Chaplin
- Written by: Charlie Chaplin
- Produced by: Charlie Chaplin
- Starring: Charlie Chaplin; Dawn Addams; Maxine Audley; Jerry Desmonde; Oliver Johnston; Michael Chaplin
- Cinematography: Georges Périnal
- Edited by: John Seabourne
- Music by: Charlie Chaplin
- Production company: Attica Film Company
- Distributed by: Archway Film Distributors
- Release date: 12 September 1957 (UK)
- Running time: 120+ minutes (1957 UK première version); 110 minutes (1957 general theatrical release version); 105 minutes (1972 US première version)
- Country: United Kingdom
- Language: English

A King in New York is a 1957 British comedy film directed by and starring Charlie Chaplin in his last leading role. The film presents a satirical view of certain aspects of American politics and society. It was produced in Europe after Chaplin's exile from the U.S. in 1952 and did not open in the United States until 1972.

== Plot ==
Deposed by revolution in his home country of Estrovia, King Igor Shahdov comes to New York City almost broke, his securities having been stolen by his own prime minister. He tries to contact the Atomic Energy Commission with his ideas for using atomic power to create a utopia.

At a televised dinner party, Shahdov reveals that he has had some experience in the theatre. He is approached to appear in television commercials but does not like the idea. Later, he does appear in several commercials for the money.

Invited to speak at a progressive school, Shahdov meets Rupert Macabee, a ten-year-old historian and editor of the school paper who does not want to disclose his political affinity, fearing McCarthyism. Macabee delivers a stern anarcho-capitalist lecture to Shahdov. Although Macabee says that he distrusts all forms of government, his parents are communists who are jailed for not disclosing names at a hearing. Because young Rupert had spent time with him, Shahdov is suspected of being a communist himself and must face one of the hearings. He accidentally directs a strong stream of water from a fire hose at the members of the committee, who scatter in panic, but he is cleared of all charges. He decides to join his estranged queen in Paris for a reconciliation.

The authorities force Macabee to reveal the names of his parents' friends in exchange for his parents' freedom. Grieving and guilt-ridden, Rupert is presented to King Shahdov as a "patriot". Shahdov reassures him that the anticommunist "scare" will soon pass and invites him to travel to Europe with his parents.

== Cast ==
- Charlie Chaplin as King Shahdov
- Maxine Audley as Queen Irene
- Jerry Desmonde as Prime Minister Voudel
- Oliver Johnston as Ambassador Jaume
- Dawn Addams as Ann Kay - TV Specialist
- Sid James as Johnson - TV Advertiser (billed as Sidney James)
- Joan Ingram as Mona Cromwell - Hostess
- Michael Chaplin as Rupert Macabee
- John McLaren as Macabee Senior
- Phil Brown as Headmaster
- Harry Green as Lawyer
- Robert Arden as Liftboy
- Alan Gifford as School Superintendent
- Robert Cawdron as U.S. Marshal
- George Woodbridge as Clifford Buckton, and Vincent Lawson as Members of Atomic Commission
- Joy Nichols as singer
- Shani Wallis as a nightclub singer
- Frazer Hines as boy
- George Truzzi as comedian
- Lauri Lupino Lane as comedian

== Reception ==
A King in New York premiered at the Leicester Square Theatre in London on 12 September 1957.

In a contemporary review for The Daily Telegraph, critic Campbell Dixon wrote of Chaplin: "Perhaps he has been overambitious. No matter how great and varied his gifts, it is too much to expect that one man shall shine steadily as producer, director, writer, composer and star. A brilliant writer, and two or three gag men as fertile as Mr. Chaplin used to be, would have made all the difference." Dixon also derided the film's message that Americans' "legitimate" concern about the dangers of communism was a form of hysteria.

The film fared well in Europe, but its lack of American distribution severely hampered its commercial impact. The film divides opinion over its merits. Variety called it a "tepid disappointment" and a "half-hearted comedy with sour political undertones" with some "spasmodically funny scenes." The film ranked at the top of Cahiers du Cinéma's Top 10 Films of the Year List in 1957. The film has a "fresh" rating of 80% on the review aggregator website Rotten Tomatoes, based on ten reviews.

Chaplin biographer Jeffrey Vance believes A King in New York to be an important film within Chaplin's body of work. He wrote: "Although A King in New York targets the social and political climate of the 1950s, its satiric commentary is timeless. Despite its flaws, the film remains a fascinating study of life in America through the eyes of its most famous exile."

The film was released in the United States in March 1972, opening at the Little Art theatre in Yellow Springs, Ohio. It was shown at UCLA in November 1973 and then opened at the Playboy Theater in New York on 21 December 1973.

Upon the film's New York release, critic Nora Sayre of The New York Times wrote: "Despite Chaplin's denials, this is a very bitter film—why should it be otherwise? We can applaud his anger, and it's easier than ever to sympathize with characters grown cautious about what they say over the phone, who worry that their rooms are bugged or sense that they're about to be subpoenaed. However, the great man botched his own political arguments, and this movie sags below the rest of his work."
