= List of Playboy Playmates of 1959 =

The following is a list of Playboy Playmates of 1959, the 5th anniversary year of the publication. Playboy magazine names its Playmate of the Month each month throughout the year.

== January ==
Virginia Gordon

Personal details
- Born: October 28, 1936 (age 89) Chaplin, West Virginia, U.S.
- Height: 5 ft 6 in (1.68 m)

Virginia Gordon (born October 28, 1936, in Chaplin, West Virginia) is an American model and actress. She was Playboy magazine's Playmate of the Month for the January 1959 issue. Her centerfold was photographed by Ron Vogel.

== February ==
Eleanor Bradley

Personal details
- Born: December 13, 1938 (age 87) Waukegan, Illinois, United States
- Height: 5 ft 8 1/2 in (1.74 m)

Eleanor Bradley (born December 13, 1938, in Waukegan, Illinois) is an American model. She was Playboy magazine's Playmate of the Month for the February 1959 issue. Her centerfold was photographed by Ron Vogel.

== March ==
Audrey Daston

Personal details
- Born: April 25, 1936 (age 89) Boise, Idaho, United States

Audrey Daston (born April 25, 1936 in Boise, Idaho) is an American model. She was Playboy magazine's Playmate of the Month for the March 1959 issue. Her centerfold was photographed by Lawrence Schiller.

== April ==
Nancy Crawford

Personal details
- Born: April 16, 1941 (age 84) Valhalla, New York, U.S.
- Height: 5 ft 5 in (1.65 m)

Nancy Crawford (born April 16, 1941, in Valhalla, New York) is an American model. She was Playboy magazine's Playmate of the Month for the April 1959 issue. Her centerfold was photographed by Barbara and Justin Kerr.

== May ==
Cindy Fuller

Personal details
- Born: May 13, 1938 Boston, Massachusetts, U.S.
- Died: January 6, 2020 (aged 81)
- Height: 5 ft 6 in (1.68 m)

Cindy Fuller (May 13, 1938 – January 6, 2020) was born in Boston, Massachusetts. She was an American model who was Playboy magazine's Playmate of the Month for its May 1959 issue. Her centerfold was photographed by Bunny Yeager. Many years later, at around the turn of the 21st century, she claimed to be the first Jewish Playmate. That means she was the first, by about seven years, before the previously presumed first one, December 1966's Susan Bernard. Fuller died on January 6, 2020, at the age of 81.

== June ==
Marilyn Hanold
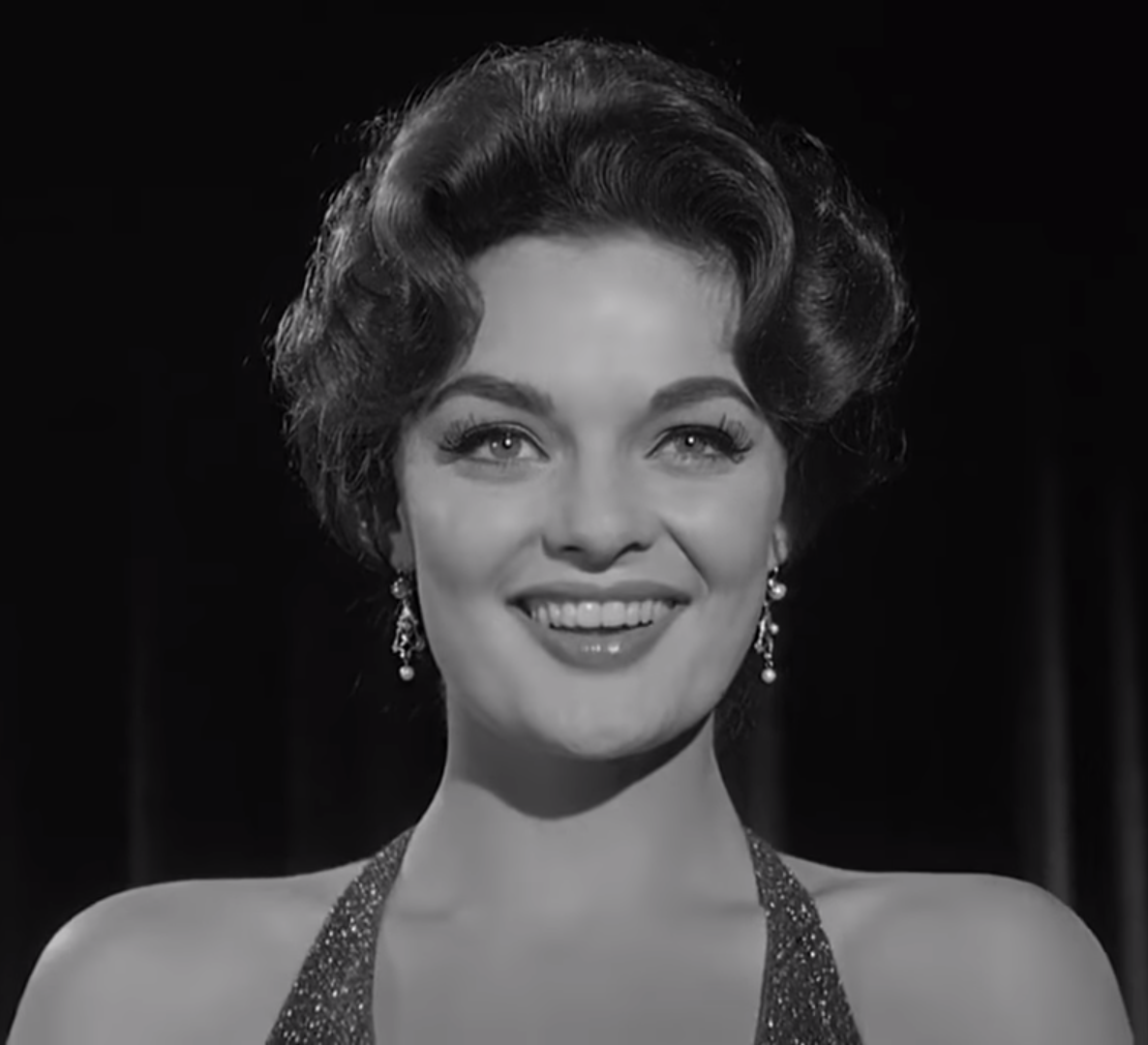

Personal details
- Born: June 9, 1938 (age 87) Jamaica, New York, United States
- Height: 5 ft 8 in (1.73 m)

Marilyn Hanold (born June 9, 1938, in Jamaica, New York) is an American model and actress. She was Playboy magazine's Playmate of the Month for its June 1959 issue. Her centerfold was photographed by Bruno Bernard.

== July ==
Yvette Vickers
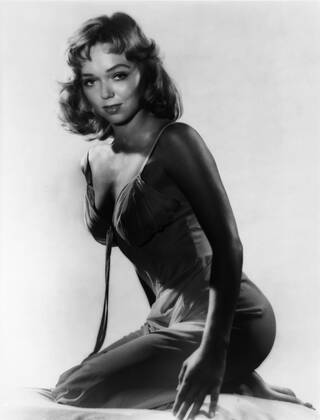

Personal details
- Born: August 26, 1928 Kansas City, Missouri
- Died: c. 2010 (aged 81-82) (exact date unknown; body found on April 27, 2011) Los Angeles
- Height: 5 ft 3 in (1.60 m)

Yvette Iola Vickers (née Vedder) (August 26, 1928 – c. 2010) was a blond-haired, blue-eyed American actress, pin-up model, and singer. In 1959 she appeared as the Playboy Playmate of the Month for the July issue. Her centerfold was photographed by Russ Meyer. She also appeared in several other men's magazines.

== August ==
Clayre Peters

Personal details
- Born: September 17, 1930 (age 95) Manhattan, New York, U.S.

Clayre Peters born September 17, 1930 in Manhattan, New York, is an American model. She is best known for being Playboy magazine's Playmate of the Month for its August 1959 issue. Her centerfold was photographed by Frank Eck.

== September ==
Marianne Gaba
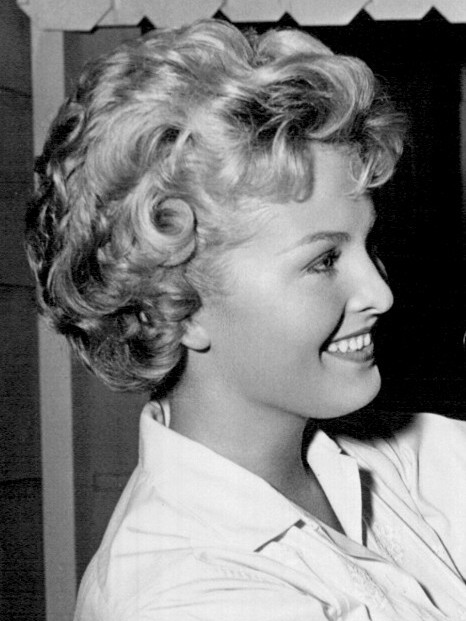

Personal details
- Born: November 13, 1939 Chicago, Illinois, U.S.
- Died: May 3, 2016 (aged 76) Los Angeles, California, U.S.
- Height: 5 ft 6 in (1.68 m)

Marianne Gaba (November 13, 1939 – May 3, 2016) was an American model, actress and beauty queen. She was Miss Illinois USA 1957 Playboy magazine's Playmate of the Month for its September 1959 issue. Marianne Gaba Starkman died from a brain tumor in Los Angeles, on May 3, 2016, at the age of 76.

== October ==
Elaine Reynolds

Personal details
- Born: September 7, 1939 (age 86) Jersey City, New Jersey
- Height: 5 ft 8 in (1.73 m)

Elaine Reynolds (born September 7, 1939, in Jersey City, New Jersey) is an American model. She was Playboy magazine's Playmate of the Month for its October 1959 issue. Her centerfold was photographed by Frank Eck. Her centerfold appears in the 1989 film Dead Poets Society.

== November ==
Donna Lynn

Personal details
- Born: September 21, 1936 (age 89) Walukee, Oklahoma
- Height: 5 ft 3.5 in (1.61 m)

Donna Lynn (born September 21, 1936, in Walukee, Oklahoma) is an American model. She was Playboy magazine's Playmate of the Month for its November 1959 issue. Her centerfold was photographed by Frank Bez.

== December ==
Ellen Stratton

Playboy Playmate of the Year
- 1960
- Succeeded by: Linda Gamble

Personal details
- Born: Bonnie La Rue Nix; June 9, 1939 Marietta, Mississippi, U.S.
- Died: April 26, 2016 (aged 76) Redlands, California, U.S.
- Height: 5 ft 4 in (1.63 m)

Bonnie La Rue Miller (née Nix, June 9, 1939 – April 26, 2016), better known as Ellen Stratton, was an American model. She was Playboy magazine's Playmate of the Month for December 1959. She also became the first "official" Playmate of the Year for 1960. Her centerfold was photographed by William Graham. She also worked as a legal secretary and real estate manager. Stratton died in Redlands, California, on April 26, 2016 at the age of 76.

== See also ==
- List of people in Playboy 1953–1959

Virginia Gordon	Eleanor Bradley	Audrey Daston	Nancy Crawford	Cindy Fuller	Marilyn Hanold
Yvette Vickers	Clayre Peters	Marianne Gaba	Elaine Reynolds	Donna Lynn	Ellen Stratton
