= James Thierrée =

Swiss-French circus performer (b. 1974)

James Thiérrée
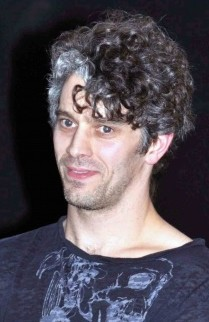
- Thierrée in 2010
- Born: James Spencer Henry Edmond Marcel Thierrée; 2 May 1974 (age 52); Lausanne, Switzerland
- Education: Piccolo Teatro; CNSAD; Acting International (Paris); Harvard Theater School
- Occupations: Circus performer, actor, theatre director
- Years active: 1978–present
- Parent(s): Victoria Chaplin; Jean-Baptiste Thierrée
- Relatives: Charlie Chaplin (maternal grandfather); Eugene O'Neill (great-grandfather)

James Spencer Henry Edmond Marcel Thierrée (born 2 May 1974) is a Swiss-French circus performer, violinist, actor and director who is best known for his theatre performances which blend contemporary circus, mime, dance, and music. He is the son of circus performers Victoria Chaplin and Jean-Baptiste Thierrée, the grandson of filmmaker Charlie Chaplin and the great-grandson of playwright Eugene O'Neill.

== Biography ==
Thierrée made his stage debut aged four in 1978, appearing alongside his older sister, Aurélia Thierrée, at his parents' small circus, Le Cirque Imaginaire. He toured with the circus and its follower, Le Cirque Invisible, throughout his childhood and teenage years, until 1994. Due to this, he was taught by tutors up to the age of twelve, when he was enrolled at the American School of Paris. Later he studied at the Piccolo Teatro in Milan, the CNSAD and the Acting International in Paris, and the Harvard Theater School in the United States. In 1991, aged fifteen, he made his film debut in the role of Ariel in Peter Greenaway's film Prospero's Books, and has since appeared in several films. He was nominated for the César Award for Most Promising Actor in 2006 for his role in Antoine de Caunes's film Twice upon a Time (2006).

In 1998 Thierrée founded his own theatre company, La Compagnie du Hanneton, and directed his first stage show, The Junebug Symphony (La Symphonie du Hanneton), in which he also performed. It toured several countries around the world and received favourable reviews from, for example, the New York Times and the Los Angeles Times. Thierrée won four Molière Awards for the show, including that of the best director and the best newcomer in 2006, and it was chosen in 2009 as one of the ten most important theatre pieces of the decade by Le Figaro. His next pieces, the Bright Abyss (2003, La Veillée des Abysses) and Au Revoir Parapluie (2007) were similarly acclaimed, and he was awarded a Molière for the latter. In 2008 he also received Le Prix Plaisir du Théâtre from the Société des Auteurs et Compositeurs Dramatiques. His fourth stage show, Raoul (2009) received more mixed reviews. Thierrée's fifth spectacle, titled Tabac Rouge, is to premiere in Lausanne in the summer of 2013.

== Ancestry ==
Ancestors of James Thierrée

2. Jean-Baptiste Thierrée
1. James Thiérrée
24. Spencer Chaplin
12. Charles Chaplin Sr
25. Ellen Elizabeth Smith
6. Charlie Chaplin
26. Charles Frederick Hill
13. Hannah Harriet Pedlingham Hill
27. Mary Ann
3. Victoria Chaplin
28. James O'Neill
14. Eugene O'Neill
29. Ella Quinlan
7. Oona O'Neill
30. Edward William Boulton
15. Agnes Boulton
31. Cecil Maud Williams

== Stage productions ==
=== Theatre roles ===
Year	Production	Location	Role	Notes
1995	Pre-Paradise, Sorry Now	Espace Toulouse-Lautrec, Paris	Unknown	Adaption of play by Rainer Werner Fassbinder, directed by Julien Collet.
1995	La Splendida Vergogna Del Fet Mal Fet	Barcelona	Unknown	Written and directed by Carlos Santos. Toured.
1995–1997	Lapin Lapin	Théâtre de la Porte Saint-Martin, Paris	Unknown	Written by Coline Serreau, directed by Benno Besson.
1998	Le Soleil Est Rare	Théâtre de la Criée, Marseille	Unknown	Written and directed by Michael Cohen.
2000	La Chauve-Souris	Paris Opera	Unknown	Adaptation of Johann Strauss II's Die Fledermaus, directed by Coline Serreau.

=== La Compagnie du Hanneton ===
Year	Production	Premiere location	Role	Notes
1998–2005	The Junebug Symphony	Orion Theatre, Stockholm		Original French title: La Symphonie du Hanneton. Toured internationally.
2003–2010	Bright Abyss	La Coursive, La Rochelle		Original French title: La Veillée des Abysses. Toured internationally.
2007–2011	Au Revoir Parapluie	Théâtre Vidy, Lausanne		Toured internationally.
2009–	Raoul	Théâtre Royal, Namur		First solo show. Still touring internationally.
2013–	Tabac Rouge	Théâtre Vidy, Lausanne		He works on the stage with the company. Tours internationally.

== Filmography ==
Year	Title	Role	Notes
1991	Prospero's Books	Ariel	
1993	Stefano Quantestorie	Teenage Stefano	
1993	The Girl in the Watermelon	Matt Carrere	Credited as James Spencer Thierrée
1995	Total Eclipse	Frederic	
1996	The Green Beautiful	Mesaje	
1996	Reckoning	Pino	Television film.
1997	Genealogies of a Crime	Young American actor	
1997	On Guard	Marcello	
1999	Appassionate	Joel	
1999	Une Femme dans la Rue	Unknown	Short film
2000	Vatel	Duc de Longueville	
2001	A Long Long Long Night of Love	Gabriele	
2002	Oui Non	Jerome	a film by Jon Jost
2003	18 Years Later	Arthur	
2003	3 Women	Unknown	
2004	Rien, voilà l'ordre	Alexis	
2005	Bye Bye Blackbird	Josef	
2005	Carmen	Mercier	Television film.
2006	Twice Upon a Time	Paul Gaylord	
2007	Buchstaben/Letters	Unknown	
2007	The Vanishing Point	Vincent	
2009	Korkoro	Félix Talouche	
2010	Bartleby – Geschichte der Wall Street	Bartleby	Television film.
2011	See How They Dance	Victor/Clément	
2013	Love Battles	He	
2016	Chocolat	George Foottit	César Award for Best Supporting Actor; Nominated—Lumière Award for Best Actor
2020	L'Autre	Paul	
