= Cane Hill Hospital =

Psychiatric hospital in London

- South London and Maudsley NHS Foundation Trust
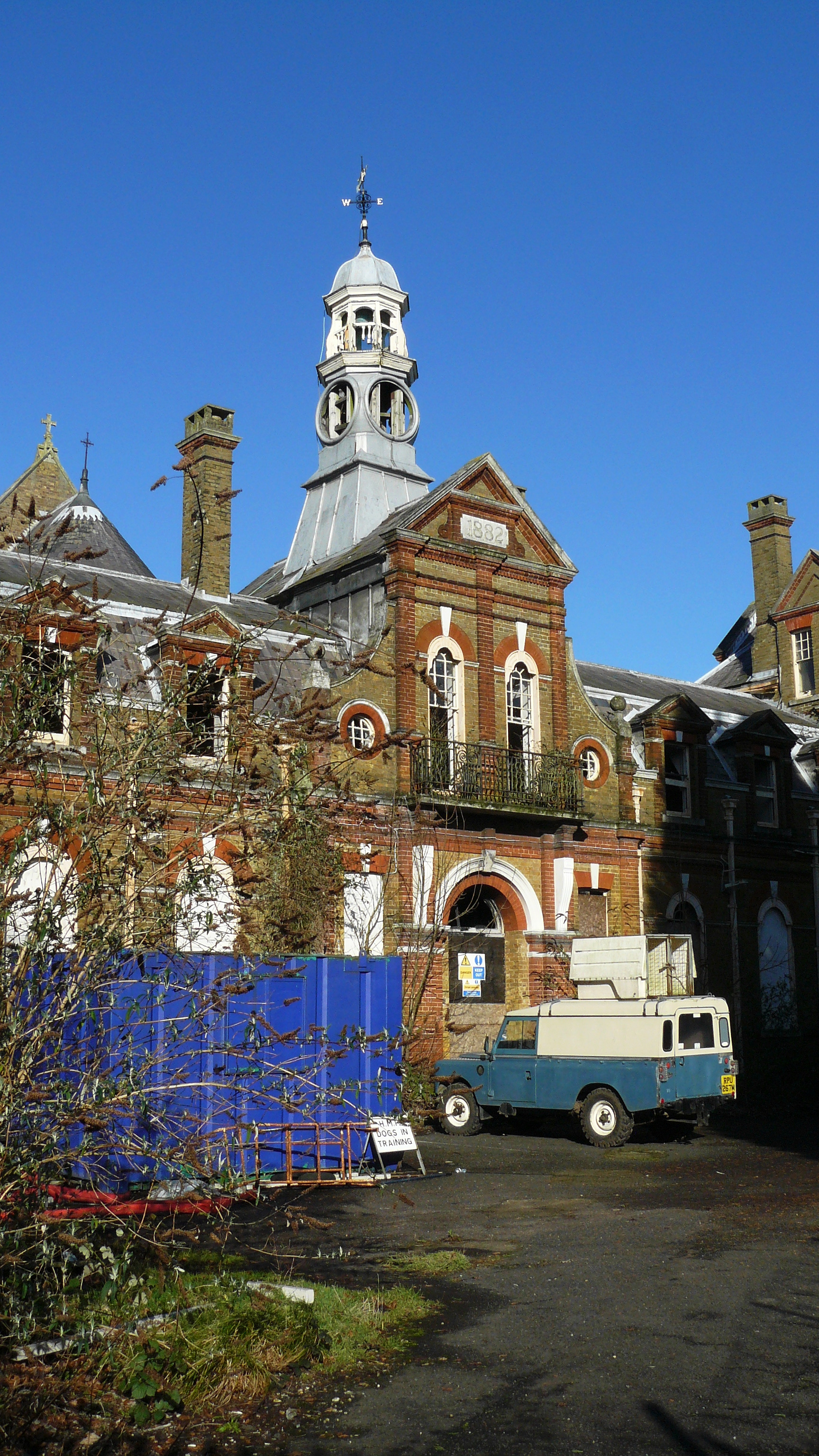
- Cane Hill in 2009

- Location within Croydon

Geography
- Location: Coulsdon, Croydon, England, United Kingdom
- Coordinates: 51.31278°N 0.14906°W

Organisation
- Care system: NHS England
- Type: Psychiatric hospital

Services
- Beds: 1,124 (1883); 2,000 (1889); 2,500 (1940); 787 (1988); 23 (1991)

History
- Founded: 1882
- Closed: 2008
- Demolished: 2008–2010

Links
- Lists: Hospitals in England

Cane Hill Hospital was a psychiatric hospital in Coulsdon in the London Borough of Croydon. The hospital motto was "Aversos compono animos" (I bring relief to troubled minds). The hospital was built in the 1880s, but from the 1960s its use was starting to decline and it eventually closed completely in the 2000s. The former site is owned by GLA Land and Property.

== History ==
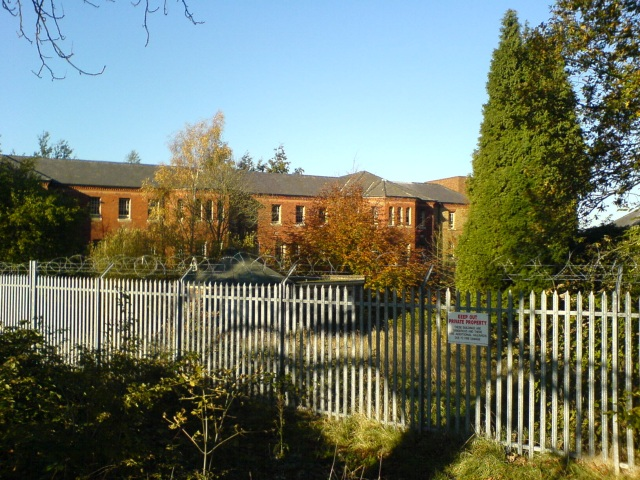
Cane Hill in 2005, before the hospital was demolished

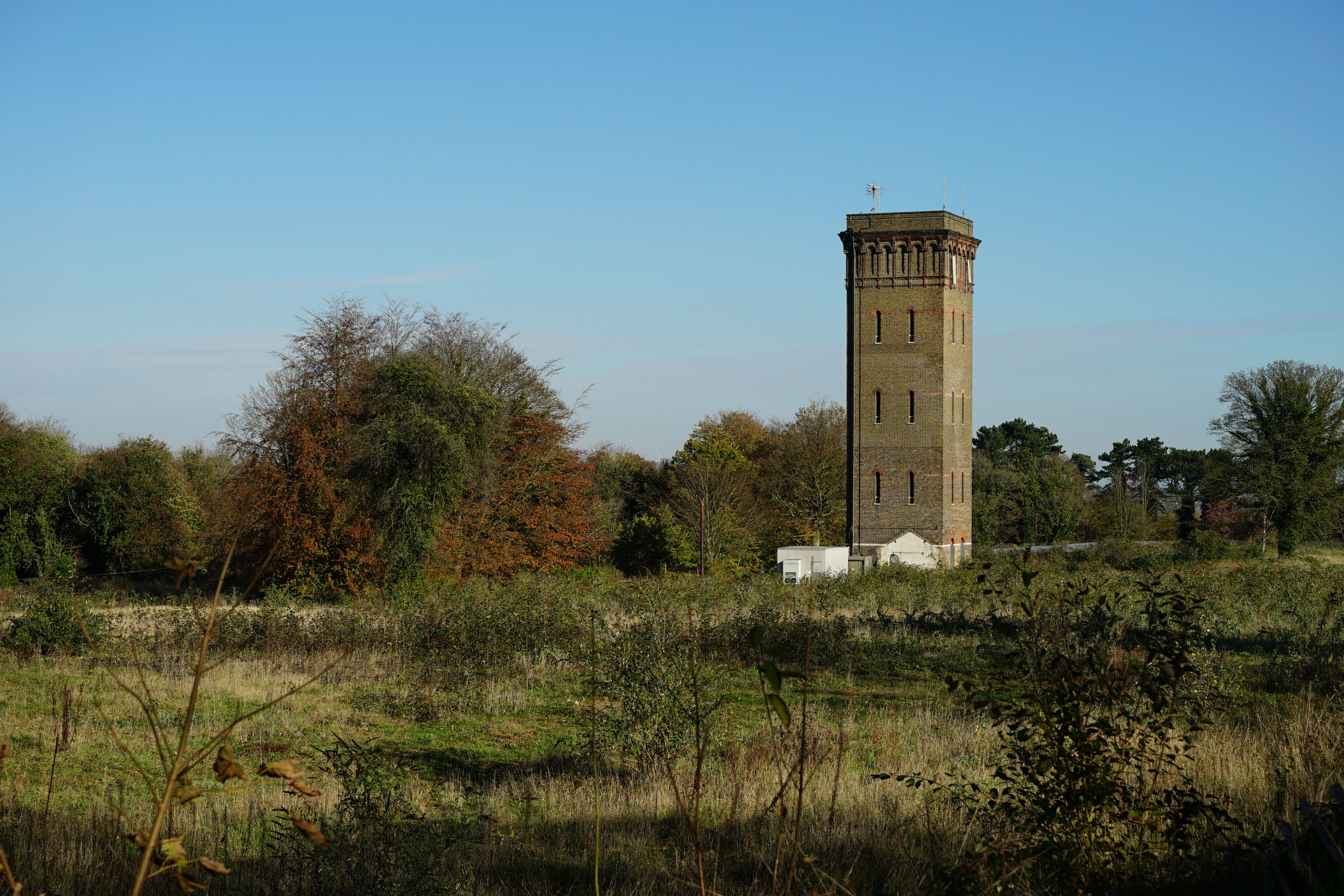
Cane Hill water tower in 2014, after the hospital was demolished

=== Founding and renaming ===
The hospital has its origins as the third Surrey County Pauper Lunatic Asylum, designed by Charles Henry Howell, which was built in two stages between 1882 and 1888. The design which involved a 'radiating pavilion' layout was original, with an estimated building cost of £150,000. Upon opening Cane Hill Asylum had capacity for 1,124 patients (644 women and 480 men) making it the largest of its kind in the UK.

The London County Council took over administration of the hospital in 1889 and expanded the hospital to a capacity of 2,000 beds the same year. The new administration renamed the hospital to London County Council Asylum with provision for Croydon, dedicating one eighth of the beds to Croydon patients until the opening of Croydon Mental Hospital in 1903.

Following the Mental Treatment Act 1930 the hospital was renamed to Cane Hill Mental Hospital. This act was later repealed by the Mental Health Act 1959 causing the hospital to rename a final time to Cane Hill Hospital.

=== Wartime service ===
The hospital took in a large number of discharged mentally ill servicemen during the First World War, the earliest patient recorded being admitted in 1915 but later discharged to another hospital in 1923. Records for nearly 40 such service patients, some of whom died and were interred in the hospital cemetery, have been found.

The outbreak of World War II saw the hospital join the Emergency Hospital Service, reserving six wards for military casualties and bringing the total number of patients to 2,500.

=== Post-War developments and decline ===
In June 1948 a patient who had climbed up onto the sloped roof of his ward in the dark was rescued from a 40 ft 0 in (12.19 m) drop by two male nurses; Harold Childs, aged 42, and Henry Garnett, aged 36. The pair were awarded the Daily Herald Order of Industrial Heroism for their "calculated act of bravery". The medals were presented at County Hall, Westminster by Mary Ormerod, chairman of the London County Council Mental Hospitals Committee.

In 1956 Members of Parliament, Norman Dodds and Donald Johnston successfully campaigned for the discharge of patient, Harriet Thornton, aged 53. A Pathé News newsreel documented her discharge on 25 October 1956, after 3 1/2 years as a patient. In the footage she is shown leaving the hospital in celebration with the two MPs. Dodds would later reference the hospital in Commons debates against what he described as "slapdash mental laws" in light of the case.

By the late 1980s the number of patients had greatly declined, largely due to the recommendations of the Mental Health Act 1983 with its emphasis on care in the community. By 1988 the hospital bed capacity had reduced to 787. Following a gradual winding down of hospital services and operations, the entire hospital with the exception of a small secure unit had closed in March 1991. The secure unit moved into what had been the Coulsdon Cottage Hospital: in 2006 it held 23 patients and was run by the South London and Maudsley NHS Foundation Trust (SLaM). The unit closed in February 2008, with the patients and staff being transferred to the River House, a new Medium Secure Unit at Bethlem Royal Hospital.

=== Fires and demolition ===
Demolition of Cane Hill started in March 2008 and was completed by the end of 2010. Only the chapel, administration building and water tower remained.

Cane Hill suffered numerous arson attacks between 2000 and 2002 resulting in the destruction of the Main Hall, Blocks C and V and heavy damage to other derelict buildings. Often the fires required multiple fire brigades to extinguish. Forty-three fire engines from 11 fire brigades responded to an attack in September 2001, and 100 fire fighters responded to a later attack in April 2002. The repeated incidents of arson prompted an increase in security on the site and construction of a 9 ft 0 in (2.74 m) barbed wire fence.

On 13 November 2010 a fire took hold in the administration block and went on to destroy all but the front facade of the building. The fire also destroyed the iconic clock tower. At about midnight, firefighters saw the clocktower crash to the ground in the blaze. The fire had been started in the basement of the building, draughting its way up through the ground and first floors before finally destroying the roof.

== Hospital cemetery ==
The hospital had a cemetery on Portnalls Road for patients which was last used for burials in September 1950 and was deconsecrated and cleared at the hospital site's redevelopment in 1981 when remains of nearly 6,000 people were exhumed and cremated at Croydon Cemetery in Mitcham Road. Among the remains were those of British First World War servicemen, who were known to have had separate areas in the cemetery where they had been originally buried with military honours. Research from plans indicated there were two designated main 'Service Plots', numbered 411 and 420, where six were buried in each grave. Eighteen of these servicemen, who had qualified for commemoration by the Commonwealth War Graves Commission (CWGC), are commemorated on a memorial the CWGC erected in Croydon Cemetery, where their ashes had been scattered at 'Location 1000' in the grounds, in 2015.

== Notable Patients ==
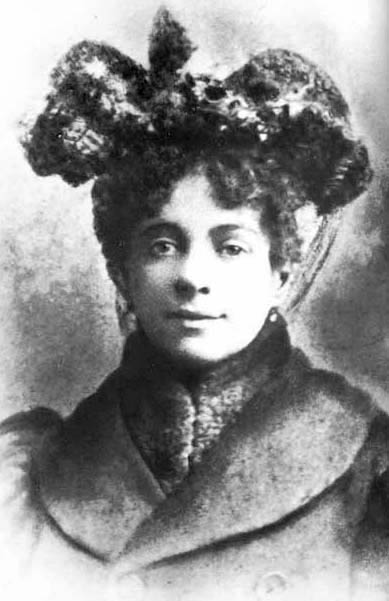
Hannah Chaplin, mother of Charlie Chaplin, was a returning patient of Cane Hill

Cane Hill Hospital accommodated several notable patients in its history:

- Hannah Chaplin, Charlie Chaplin's mother, was admitted to the hospital on multiple occasions suffering the effects of syphilis and the negative effects of her husband's death, Charles Chaplin Sr.
- Terry Burns, David Bowie's half brother was admitted to the hospital after multiple suicide attempts. He escaped the hospital grounds in 1985 and took his own life at the nearby Coulsdon South railway station.
- John George Boorman, David Walliams' paternal great grandfather was admitted to the hospital on 21 October 1919, suffering shell shock from his experiences in the First World War. Boorman remained a patient for 43 years and died at the hospital on 28 September 1962. His story was later documented on the BBC television show, Who Do You Think You Are, October 2020.
- David Burchell, Michael Caine's half brother was admitted to the hospital age 17 following an epileptic seizure. He remained a patient until the late 1980s.

== Legacy ==
A drawing of the Cane Hill Hospital administration block is featured on the front cover of the US release of David Bowie's 1970 album The Man Who Sold the World. Metal band Cane Hill based their name on the Cane Hill Hospital.
