= Vengeance of the Deep (1923 film) =

1923 film

- Directed by: Barry Barringer
- Written by: Julian La Mothe; Agnes Parsons
- Produced by: A. B. Barringer
- Cinematography: Paul Ivano; William C. McGann; Homer Scott
- Distributed by: American Releasing Corporation
- Release date: April 18, 1923
- Running time: 5 reels
- Country: United States
- Language: Silent...English intertitles

Vengeance of the Deep is a lost 1923 film directed by Barry Barringer and starring Ralph Lewis, Virginia Brown Faire and Richard Arlen.

== Plot ==
Captain Musgrove, the harsh ruler of a South Sea island, bars the local inhabitants from taking part in his pearl-diving operation. After Tagu, the son of the island's chief, is punished for poaching, he seeks revenge by attempting to kill Frederico, Musgrove's chief diver. Frederico plans to marry Musgrove's daughter, Ethel, but she is in love with Jean, a beachcomber.

While conducting an experimental dive, Jean and Frederico discover a treasure chest and agree to keep it hidden from Musgrove. On their way back to shore, however, Frederico leaves Jean behind after he becomes trapped by a giant clam. Frederico proceeds with his plans to marry Ethel, but Jean eventually emerges from the sea and confronts his rival. Jean wins Ethel's affection and takes Frederico's place as Musgrove's chief diver.

== Cast ==
- Ralph Lewis as Captain Musgrove
- Virginia Brown Faire as Ethel Musgrove
- Richard Arlen as Jean (billed as Van Mattimore)
- Harmon MacGregor as Frederico
- William Anderson as Tagu
- Bowditch M. Turner as Native Chief (as 'Smoke' Turner)
- Maida Vale as Kiliki

== External list ==
- Vengeance of the Deep at IMDb
