= Jean-Baptiste Thierrée =

French actor (born 1937)

- Born: 2 May 1937 (age 88); Paris, France
- Occupations: Actor; circus performer
- Years active: 1957–present
- Spouses: Betty Duhamel (m. 19??; div. 19??); Victoria Chaplin (m. 1969)
- Children: 3, including Aurélia Thierrée and James Thierrée

Jean-Baptiste Thierrée (born 2 May 1937) is a French actor and circus performer. He is married to Victoria Chaplin and is the father of Aurélia Thierrée and James Thierrée.

In theatre, Thierrée appeared on stage in Les Coréens, directed by Michel Vinaver, in 1957. The same year hired Roger Planchon Thierrée to create Théâtre de la Cité. Thierrée has also worked with Peter Brook.

In cinema, Thierrée played the role of Bernard in the French psychological drama film Muriel (1963). He and his wife Victoria Chaplin also appeared briefly as two clowns in Federico Fellini's The Clowns (1970).

Thierrée and Chaplin had first come into contact after he read about Chaplin's aspiration of becoming a circus clown in a magazine article of her father, and asked her to form a new type of circus with him. Soon after a couple of secret meetings, they eloped in 1969. In 1971, they performed for the first time with the contemporary circus Le Cirque Bonjour, which they had founded together, at Festival d'Avignon. In 1974, they founded a new, smaller circus Le Cirque Imaginaire, which centered only on their, and occasionally their children's, performances, and from 1990 onward have performed under the name Le Cirque Invisible.

Thierrée and Chaplin have two children, Aurélia Thierrée (born 24 September 1971), and James Thierrée (born 2 May 1974), who are performing artists. Thierrée also has a daughter named Juliette (born 7 November 1967), from an earlier marriage to French writer Betty Duhamel fr. Juliette is a painter, sculptor and a performer.
