= Josselyn's Wife (1926 film) =

1926 film

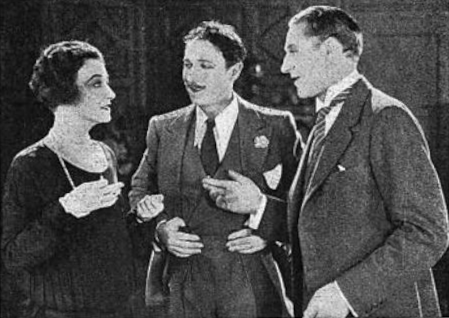
- A scene with Pauline Frederick, Armand Kaliz, and Holmes Herbert
- Directed by: Richard Thorpe
- Written by: Agnes Parsons; Kathleen Norris (novel)
- Produced by: Tiffany Productions
- Starring: Pauline Frederick
- Cinematography: Milton Moore; Mack Stengler
- Edited by: Harold Young
- Distributed by: Tiffany Pictures
- Release date: November 15, 1926
- Running time: 60 minutes
- Country: USA
- Language: Silent (English intertitles)

Josselyn's Wife is a 1926 silent crime drama directed by Richard Thorpe and starring Pauline Frederick. It was produced and distributed by the Tiffany Pictures company. A previous film was released in 1919 as Josselyn's Wife.

This film is incomplete at BFI National Film and Television Archive in London.

== Cast ==
- Pauline Frederick as Lillian Josselyn
- Holmes Herbert as Thomas Josselyn
- Armand Kaliz as Pierre Marchand
- Josephine Hill as Ellen Marchand
- Carmelita Geraghty as Flo
- Freeman Wood as Mr. Arthur
- Pat Harmon as Detective
- Ivy Livingston as Maid
- William A. Carroll as Butler
