= Victoria Chaplin =

British-American circus performer

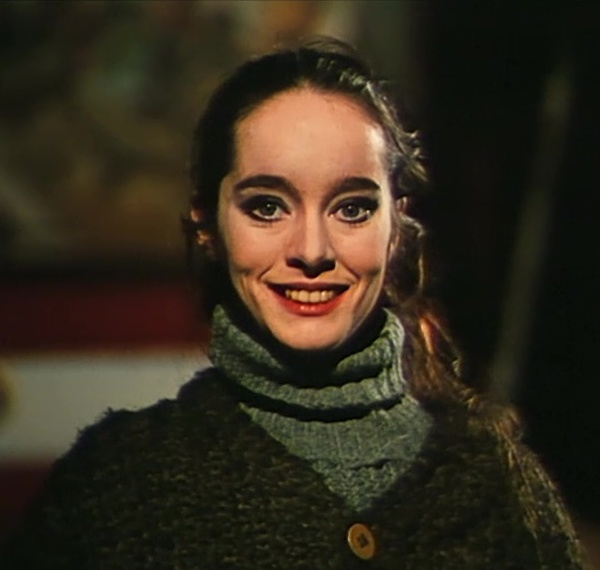
- Victoria Chaplin in The Clowns (1970)
- Born: Victoria Agnes Chaplin; May 19, 1951 (age 74); Santa Monica, California, U.S.
- Occupation: Circus performer
- Years active: 1966–present
- Spouse: Jean-Baptiste Thierrée (m. 1969)
- Children: Aurélia; James
- Parents: Oona O'Neill; Charlie Chaplin
- Family: Chaplin family

Victoria Agnes Chaplin-Thierrée (born May 19, 1951) is a British-American circus performer. She is a daughter of film actor and comedian Charlie Chaplin from his fourth wife, Oona O'Neill, and a granddaughter of playwright Eugene O'Neill.

Chaplin was born at Saint John's Health Center in Santa Monica, but grew up in Switzerland. As a teenager, she appeared as an extra in her father's last film, A Countess from Hong Kong (1966). Her father also wanted her to star in the main role of a winged girl found from the Amazonian rainforest in his next planned film, The Freak, in 1969. However, the project was never filmed because of his declining health and because Victoria eloped with the French actor Jean-Baptiste Thierrée.

Chaplin and Thierrée had first come into contact after he read about Chaplin's aspiration of becoming a circus clown in a magazine article of her father, and asked her to form a new type of circus with him. Soon after their elopement, they briefly appeared as two clowns in Federico Fellini's The Clowns (1970), and the next year performed for the first time with the contemporary circus Le Cirque Bonjour, which they had founded together, at Festival d'Avignon. In 1974, they founded a new, smaller circus Le Cirque Imaginaire, which centered only on their, and occasionally their children's, performances, and from 1990 onward have performed under the name Le Cirque Invisible.

Chaplin and Thierrée have two children, Aurélia Thierrée (born 24 September 1971), and James Thierrée (born 2 May 1974), who are performing artists. In addition to performing in Le Cirque Invisible, Chaplin also helped in creating her children's shows, and in 2006, was awarded the Molière Award, the French national theatre prize, for designing the costumes for her son's show, The Junebug Symphony.
