= Jean-Claude Gardin =

French archaeologist (1925–2013)

Jean-Claude Gardin (3 April 1925 – 8 April 2013) was a French archaeologist who advanced archaeological computing.

Gardin worked with the organizations UNESCO and the European Atomic Energy Community in the 1950s to the 1960s, leading the creation of an indexing language, the Syntagmatic Organization Language (SYNTOL). He founded the Centre Mécanographique de Documentation Archéologique at French National Center for Scientific Research in 1957. He participated in the excavation of ancient Bactrian sites in Afghanistan. He also contributed to the contemporary debates on the theory of archaeology and of the social sciences.

In 1989 he married the American actress Josephine Chaplin, a daughter of Charlie Chaplin.
