= Wheeler Dryden =

English-born American actor (1892–1957)

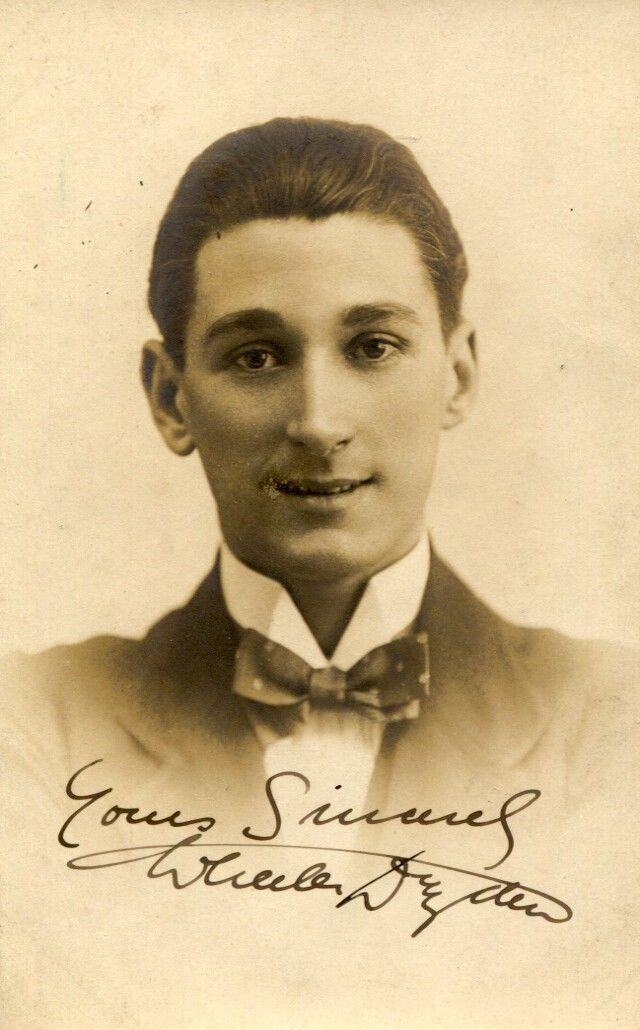
- Autographed photograph of Wheeler Dryden
- Born: George Dryden Wheeler Jr. 31 August 1892; Brixton, London, England
- Died: 30 September 1957 (aged 65); Los Angeles, California, U.S.
- Other name: Wheeler Dryden
- Occupations: Actor, director
- Spouse: Alice Chapple (m. 1938; div. 1943)
- Children: Spencer Dryden
- Parent(s): Leo Dryden; Hannah Hill
- Relatives: Sydney and Charlie Chaplin (half-brothers)

George Dryden Wheeler Jr. (31 August 1892 – 30 September 1957), also known as Leo George Wheeler but known professionally as Wheeler Dryden, was an English-born American actor and film director. He was the son of Hannah Chaplin and music hall entertainer Leo Dryden, and younger half-brother of actors Sir Charlie and Sydney Chaplin.

He moved to the United States in 1918, joining his mother and two half-brothers. He worked as an actor and director, sometimes assisting Charlie Chaplin. He was married for a short time to ballerina Anna Chapple and they had one child together, Spencer Dryden, who became a rock musician with several prominent American bands and was inducted into the Rock and Roll Hall of Fame.

== Life and career ==
He was born as George Dryden Wheeler Jr. in London, the youngest of three boys born to Hannah Hill Chaplin, and the son of Leo Dryden, a music hall entertainer. While George was an infant, his father removed him from his mentally troubled mother, who was committed to a mental asylum for a time. He grew up estranged from her and his two older half-brothers. Known as Wheeler, Dryden became an entertainer like his father. In 1915 he was touring India and the Far East as a Vaudeville comedian when his father first told him that the newly famous actor Charlie Chaplin was his half-brother.

At this point, Dryden (who adopted use of this as his surname) wrote several letters to Chaplin and his half-brother Sydney, but received no response from either of them. In 1917, he got in touch with Chaplin's lead actress, Edna Purviance, who is thought to have convinced Chaplin to recognise Dryden as his half-brother.

He joined the Chaplin brothers and their mother in America in 1918. After nearly two decades, he became a naturalized U.S. citizen in 1936.

Wheeler Dryden

Dryden entered the growing film world as an actor, and later worked as a director. He appeared in Stan Laurel's Mud and Sand and was the "other man" in the melodrama, False Women. In 1928, he directed Syd Chaplin in A Little Bit of Fluff. He also played Plimsoll in the 1928 – 1929 Broadway theatre play, Wings Over Europe.

Later, he worked at the Chaplin Studios as Charlie's assistant director on The Great Dictator and Monsieur Verdoux. He also appears in the supporting roles of a doctor and a clown in Chaplin's last American film, Limelight (1952).

After Charlie Chaplin left America for Switzerland in 1952, Dryden managed the winding down of Chaplin's Hollywood business affairs until 1954, when the studio was sold. In his final years, he suffered from mental illness and reclusiveness. His difficulties were exacerbated by aggressive FBI inquiries into his brother's politics, during the period of increasing anti-Communist actions by government and Hollywood studios in the US.

Dryden died in Los Angeles in 1957.

=== Family ===
In 1938 Dryden married Alice Chapple (1911–2005), a prima ballerina of the Radio City Music Hall dancers. They had a son Spencer Dryden before they divorced in 1943. Dryden took his son to Los Angeles jazz clubs during the 1950s, which inspired his musical ambitions as a jazz and rock drummer. Spencer became a musician and played with Jefferson Airplane, New Riders of the Purple Sage, and other bands; he was inducted into the Rock and Roll Hall of Fame in 1996.

== Selected filmography ==
Year	Title	Role	Notes
1920	The Crucifix of Destiny	Leading Man	
1921	False Women	Richard Lane	
1922	Mud and Sand	Sapo	
1922	Penrod		Uncredited
1940	The Great Dictator	Heinrich Schtick - Translator	Voice
1947	Monsieur Verdoux	Salesman	Uncredited
1952	Limelight	Thereza's Doctor	(final film role)
