= Chaplin: A Life =

2008 biography by Stephen M. Weissman

- Author: Stephen M. Weissman
- Language: English
- Subject: Biography
- Publisher: Arcade Publishing
- Publication date: October 2008
- Publication place: United States
- Media type: Hardcover
- ISBN: 978-1-55970-892-0
- OCLC: 225870336
- Dewey Decimal: 791.4302/8092 B 22
- LC Class: PN2287.C5 W45 2008

Chaplin: A Life is a 2008 biography of the actor Charlie Chaplin by American psychoanalyst Stephen M. Weissman. The book examines young Chaplin's early childhood experiences and the formative role they later played in shaping his art. An ex-London street urchin, Chaplin used humor to creatively transform real life boyhood experiences of homelessness into his screen character's picaresque adventures as the streetwise Little Tramp.
