= Stephen M. Weissman =

Stephen M. Weissman is a psychoanalyst and biographer who has written and published Chaplin: A Life, His Brother's Keeper: A Psycho-biography of Samuel Taylor Coleridge, and Frederick Douglass: Portrait of A Black Militant.
