= Roland Chaplain =

English lecturer and author

Roland Philip Chaplain, MA, PhD, CPsychol, AFBPsS lectured in the psychology of education in the Faculty of Education, University of Cambridge. Chaplain has published numerous books on classroom management and stress from the perspective of teacher, head teacher and student. He also works as an Educational Consultant providing courses managing pupil behaviour, motivation and stress, coping and well-being to staff in primary and secondary schools

== Books published ==
- Chaplain, R. (2018). Teaching without Disruption in the Secondary School: A practical approach to managing pupil behaviour 2nd. Edition London: Routledge,
- Chaplain, R. (2016). Teaching without disruption in the primary school: A practical approach to managing pupil behaviour. 2nd Edition London: Routledge
- Chaplain, R. & Smith, S. (2006) Challenging Behaviour. Pearson.
- Chaplain, R. (2003) Teaching Without Disruption (Volume I) A model for managing pupil behaviour in the secondary school. Routledge Falmer.
- Chaplain, R. (2003) Teaching Without Disruption (Volume II) A model for managing pupil behaviour in the primary school. Routledge Falmer.
- Chaplain, R. with Kershner R. (2001) Understanding Special Educational Needs: A teacher's guide to effective school-based research. David Fulton.
- Chaplain, R. (1998) Coping with Difficult Children: Emotional and behavioural difficulties. Pearson.
- Chaplain, R. (1996) Pupil Behaviour in Secondary Schools. Pearson.
- Chaplain, R. (1996) Pupil Behaviour in Primary Schools. Pearson.
- Chaplain, R. and Freeman, A. (1996) Stress and Coping. Pearson.
- Chaplain, R., Rudduck, J. and Wallace, G. (eds.) (1996) School Improvement: What can pupils tell us? David Fulton.
- Chaplain, R. and Freeman A. (1994) Caring Under Pressure 1994 David Fulton.

== Sources ==
- Roland Chaplain's staff page at the Faculty of Education
