= Alice Chaplin =

British artist

- Born: 1848; Sudbury, Suffolk, England
- Died: 15 June 1921 (aged 72–73); Fulham, London
- Known for: Sculpture

Alice Mary Chaplin (1848–15 June 1921) was a British sculptor who produced statuettes and sculpture groups in bronze and terracotta.

== Biography ==
Chaplin was born in Sudbury in Suffolk to James Chaplin and his wife Eliza Hales. Chaplin moved to London to study sculpture and settled in Chelsea, remaining in west London for the rest of her life. She produced statuettes and sculpture groups, often of animals, in bronze and terracotta. Between 1877 and 1900, Chaplin exhibited 18 works at the Royal Academy in London. She was also a regular exhibitor at the Walker Art Gallery in Liverpool. At the 1903 Arts and Crafts exhibition in London she showed a statuette of a puma. A number of animal works by Chaplin were acquired by Queen Victoria. Chaplin died at Fulham in London in 1921. Her sister Florence, (1850–1936) was a portrait painter of some note.
