= John Worthy Chaplin =

Recipient of the Victoria Cross

- Born: 23 July 1840; Ewhurst Park, Ramsdell, Hampshire
- Died: 18 August 1920 (aged 80); Market Harborough, Leicestershire
- Burial place: Kibworth New Cemetery
- Military career
- Allegiance: United Kingdom
- Branch: British Army
- Rank: Colonel
- Units: 67th Regiment of Foot; 100th Regiment of Foot; 8th Hussars
- Conflicts: Second Opium War; Second Anglo-Afghan War
- Awards: Victoria Cross; Companion of the Order of the Bath; China Medal 1857–1860; Afghanistan Medal 1878–1880

Colonel John Worthy Chaplin, VC, CB (23 July 1840 – 18 August 1920) was a British Army officer and an English recipient of the Victoria Cross, the highest award for gallantry in the face of the enemy that can be awarded to British and Commonwealth forces.

== Details ==
Chaplin was 20 years old, and an ensign in the 67th Regiment of Foot, British Army during the Second China War when the following deed took place for which he was awarded the VC.

On 21 August 1860 at the Taku Forts, China, Ensign Chaplin was carrying the Queen's Colours of the Regiment and first planted the Colours on the breach made by the storming party, assisted by a private. He then planted the Colours on the bastion of the fort which he was the first to mount, but in doing so he was severely wounded.

He achieved the rank of colonel. Chaplin was a member of Boodle's club in St James's, London, from 1880 until death.

== The medal ==
His Victoria Cross is displayed at The Royal Hampshire Regiment Museum and Memorial Garden in Winchester, England.
