= Carmen Chaplin =

British/Irish actress and director

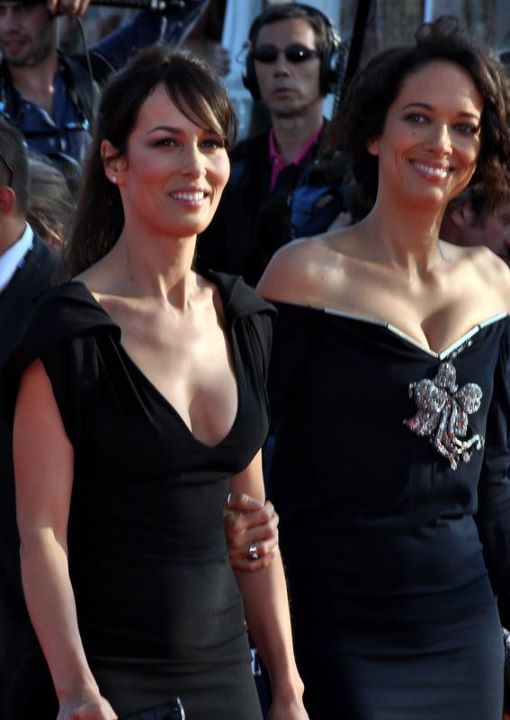
- Carmen Chaplin (right), with her sister Dolores in Deauville in 2011
- Born: c. 1972; London, England
- Citizenship: British, Irish, Overseas Citizenship of India
- Occupations: Actress, film director
- Years active: 1991–present
- Spouse: Ashim Bhalla
- Children: 1
- Parent(s): Michael Chaplin; Patricia Betaudier

Carmen Chaplin (born c. 1972) is an English and Irish actress and film director. Carmen is the daughter of Michael Chaplin, granddaughter of Charlie Chaplin, and great-granddaughter of American playwright Eugene O'Neill. Her mother is the British-Irish painter Patricia Betaudier, daughter of Trinidadian artist Patrick Betaudier.

== Background ==
Chaplin was born in London, United Kingdom, to actor Michael Chaplin, who is of English and Irish heritage, and his second wife, Patricia Betaudier, daughter of the interracial Irish and Trinidadian couple, and was raised in France and Spain. She made her film debut in Wim Wenders' Until the End of the World (1991), and has since appeared in several films, such as My Favourite Season (1993), The Serpent's Kiss (1997), and the American action comedy All About the Benjamins (2002). She has directed one short film, Tryst in Paname, starring her real-life sister Dolores Chaplin and Bambou Gainsbourg.

== Filmography ==
Year	Title	Role	Notes
1991	Until the End of the World	No character identified	
1993	La Nuit Sacrée	Fatima	
1993	My Favourite Season	Khadija	
1994	Honorin et l'enfant prodigue	Maria	Television film
1995	Highlander: The Series	Maria Campalo	Television series: Episode: "Methos"
1995	Dis moi oui...	Candice	
1995	Sabrina	Paris' friend	
1997	Ciel d'orage	Valerie	Television film
1997	The Serpent's Kiss	Thea/Anna	
1997	After Sex	Copine Narou	
1999	Why Not Me?	Lili	
2000	Vertiges	Aline Jourdain	Television series: Episode: "Souviens-Toi"
2001	Regarde-moi	Ariane	
2001	Lo strano caso del signor Kappa		
2002	Snapshots	Aïsha	
2002	All About the Benjamins	Ursula	
2006	Day on Fire	Najia	
2007	Liliana. Rebecca		Short film
2007	Prisoners of the Sun	Sarah Masterton	Delayed release on DVD and Blu-ray in 2013
2009	Don't Look Up	Romy Bardoc	
2010	The Rake	Lucia	Short film
2010	Shadows and Lies	Lovely woman (uncredited)	
2012	Tryst in Paname		Short film. Directed by Carmen Chaplin. She does not appear in the film.

== Ancestry ==
Ancestors of Carmen Chaplin

8. Charles Chaplin Sr
4. Charlie Chaplin
9. Hannah Harriet Pedlingham Hill
2. Michael Chaplin
10. Eugene O'Neill
5. Oona O'Neill
11. Agnes Boulton
1. Carmen Chaplin
6. Patrick Betaudier
3. Patricia Betaudier
