= Josephine Chaplin =

American actress (1949–2023)

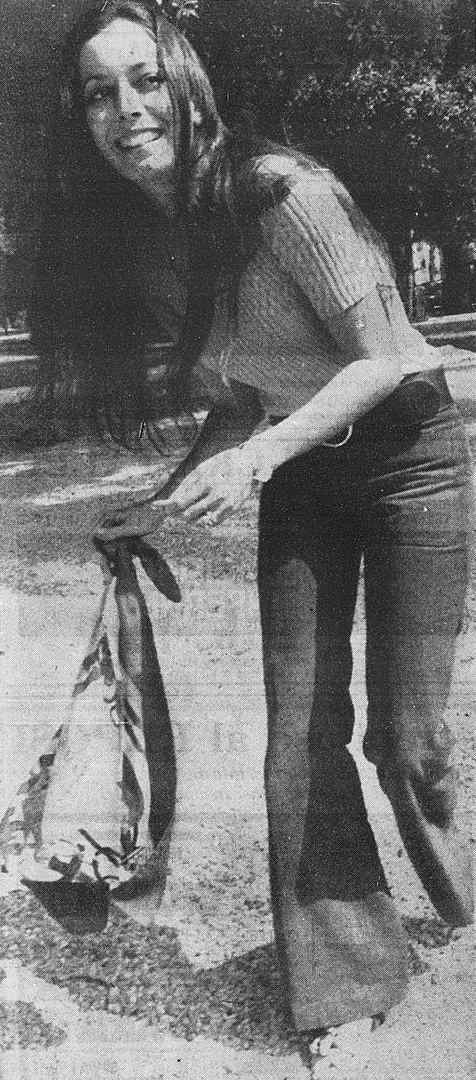
- Chaplin in 1971
- Born: Josephine Hannah Chaplin; March 28, 1949; Santa Monica, California, U.S.
- Died: July 13, 2023 (aged 74); Paris, France
- Occupation: Actress
- Spouses: Nicholas Sistovaris (m. 1969; div. 1977); Jean-Claude Gardin (m. 1989; died 2013)
- Partner: Maurice Ronet (1977–1983; his death)
- Children: 3
- Parents: Charlie Chaplin (father); Oona O'Neill (mother)
- Relatives: Geraldine Chaplin (sister); Eugene O'Neill (grandfather); Agnes Boulton (grandmother); Oona Chaplin (niece)
- Family: Chaplin

Josephine Hannah Chaplin (March 28, 1949 – July 13, 2023) was an American actress. A member of the Chaplin family, she was the daughter of actor and filmmaker Charlie Chaplin and his fourth wife, Oona O'Neill.

== Life and career ==
Chaplin was born in Santa Monica, California in 1949, and was raised in Switzerland and Great Britain after her father was barred from reentering the United States. She made her film debut at the age of three, alongside her father in Limelight, and later appeared in his final directorial effort A Countess from Hong Kong.

After moving to Paris in the 1970s, she appeared in various of French films and television series, working with directors such as Georges Franju and André Hunebelle.

In 1972, she had a featured role in Pier Paolo Pasolini's The Canterbury Tales (1972) as May, the adulterous wife of the elderly Sir January. That same year, she also had a starring role in Menahem Golan's Escape to the Sun (1972). In 1984, she appeared in the Canadian film The Bay Boy (1984), starring a young Kiefer Sutherland in his debut film role. She played Ernest Hemingway's first wife Hadley Richardson in the 1988 American miniseries Hemingway, starring Stacy Keach.

She also starred in two films by Spanish cult filmmaker Jess Franco: Jack the Ripper (1976) and Downtown Heat (1991).

Outside of her acting career, Chaplin ran her family's office in Paris for many years.

== Personal life ==
Chaplin was married to Greek furrier Nicholas Sistovaris; the couple had one child, Charly.

Chaplin had a son, Julien Ronet, by French actor Maurice Ronet, with whom she lived until his death in 1983.

Chaplin married French archaeologist Jean-Claude Gardin in 1989, with whom she had a son, Arthur. They stayed married until Gardin's death in 2013.

=== Death ===
Josephine Chaplin died in Paris on July 13, 2023, at the age of 74.

== Filmography ==
- Limelight (1952) as the Child in opening scene (uncredited)
- A Countess from Hong Kong (1967)
- Canterbury Tales (1972)
- Escape to the Sun (1972)
- L'Odeur des fauves (1972)
- The Four Charlots Musketeers (1974)
- The Four Charlots Musketeers 2 (1974)
- Nuits Rouges (1974)
- Docteur Françoise Gailland (1976)
- The Peaks of Zelengora (1976)
- Jack the Ripper (1976)
- À l'ombre d'un été (1976)
- The Bay Boy (1984)
- Poulet au vinaigre (1985).
- Coïncidences (1986)
- Downtown Heat (1994)

== Television ==
- L'Homme sans visage (1975)
- Les années d'illusion (1977)
- Histoires insolites (1979)
- Histoires extraordinaires (TV series) (1981)
- Donatien-François, marquis de Sade (1985)
- Symphonie (1986)
- Les enquêtes du commissaire Maigret (1987)
- Hemingway (1988)
- Le masque (1989)
