= John Chaplin (coach) =

American track and field coach

John Chaplin (born April 9, 1937) is a former track and field coach at Washington State University in Pullman. He was head coach of the 2000 U.S. men’s Olympic Track & Field team.
