= Charles Chaplin (artist) =

English artist, engraver and printmaker

Charles Chaplin (1907–1987) was an English artist, engraver and printmaker.

"You teach me a little about engraving and I will teach you a little about art" was the remarkable offer made by Robert Austin to his new student, Charles Chaplin. Austin, an eminent engraver himself, had become Chaplin's tutor at the Royal College of Art in September 1947. Chaplin, a mature student, was a printer's commercial engraver; he was also an amateur artist whose prints had already received some recognition and had been hung at the Royal Academy summer exhibitions. He had, however, had little formal education or art training. Austin's encouragement was a major influence on Chaplin's subsequent career as an artist.

The years before World War II cover Chaplin's birth into a large working-class family, his early love of drawing, the accident which left him with only one eye, and his apprenticeship in a large printing works. After the war, he enrolled as a Saturday student at the Royal College of Art and, thereafter, his style developed significantly. Following his retirement from the printing industry, his prolific output continued unabated, encouraged by new contacts in Sweden and Canada. A shy man who loved the countryside and recorded its trees, lakes, weather, wildlife, and the fascinating rural clutter of its farmyard, his family life is revealed in the detail of his work.

His favourite technique was line engraving on copper, although he used several techniques during his career.

Known in his lifetime only to a small number of collectors, Chaplin's work is now being discovered by a wider public. A book about Chaplin and his work published in 2005 collects the prints, facts concerning the prints, and the background of his life.
