= Chaplin, West Virginia =

Unincorporated community in West Virginia, United States

Chaplin
- Unincorporated community
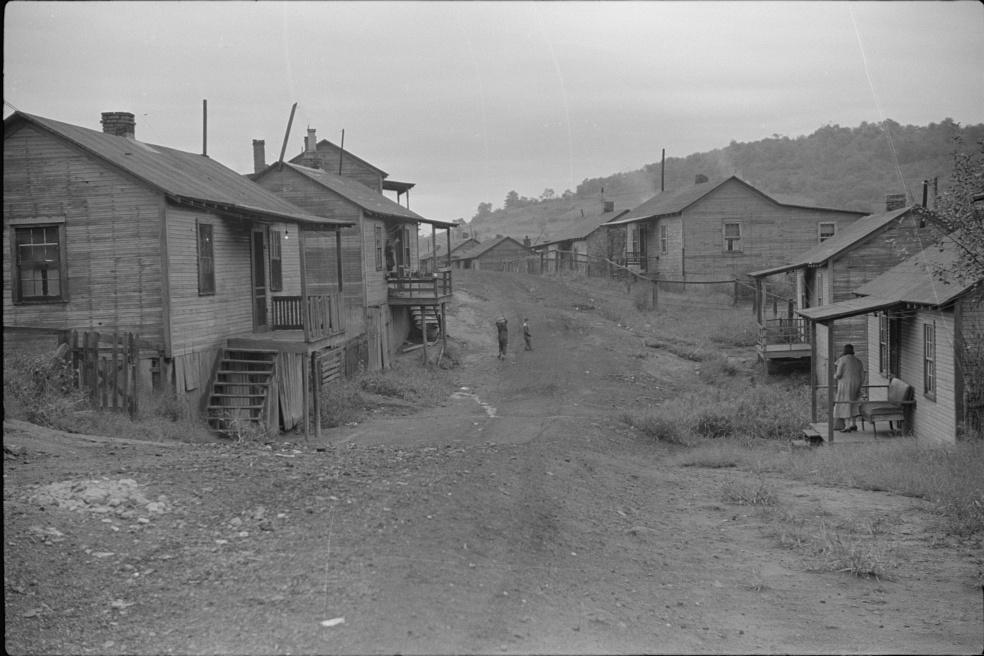
- Chaplin, 1938. Photo by Marion Post Wolcott.

- Location within the state of West Virginia Chaplin (the United States)
- Coordinates: 39°39′2″N 80°1′42″W
- Country: United States
- State: West Virginia
- County: Monongalia
- Elevation: 1,033 ft (315 m)
- Time zone: UTC-5 (Eastern (EST))
  - Summer (DST): UTC-4 (EDT)
- GNIS ID: 2750094

Chaplin is an unincorporated community and coal town in Monongalia County, West Virginia, United States.
