= Charles Chaplin Sr. =

English music hall entertainer (1863–1901)

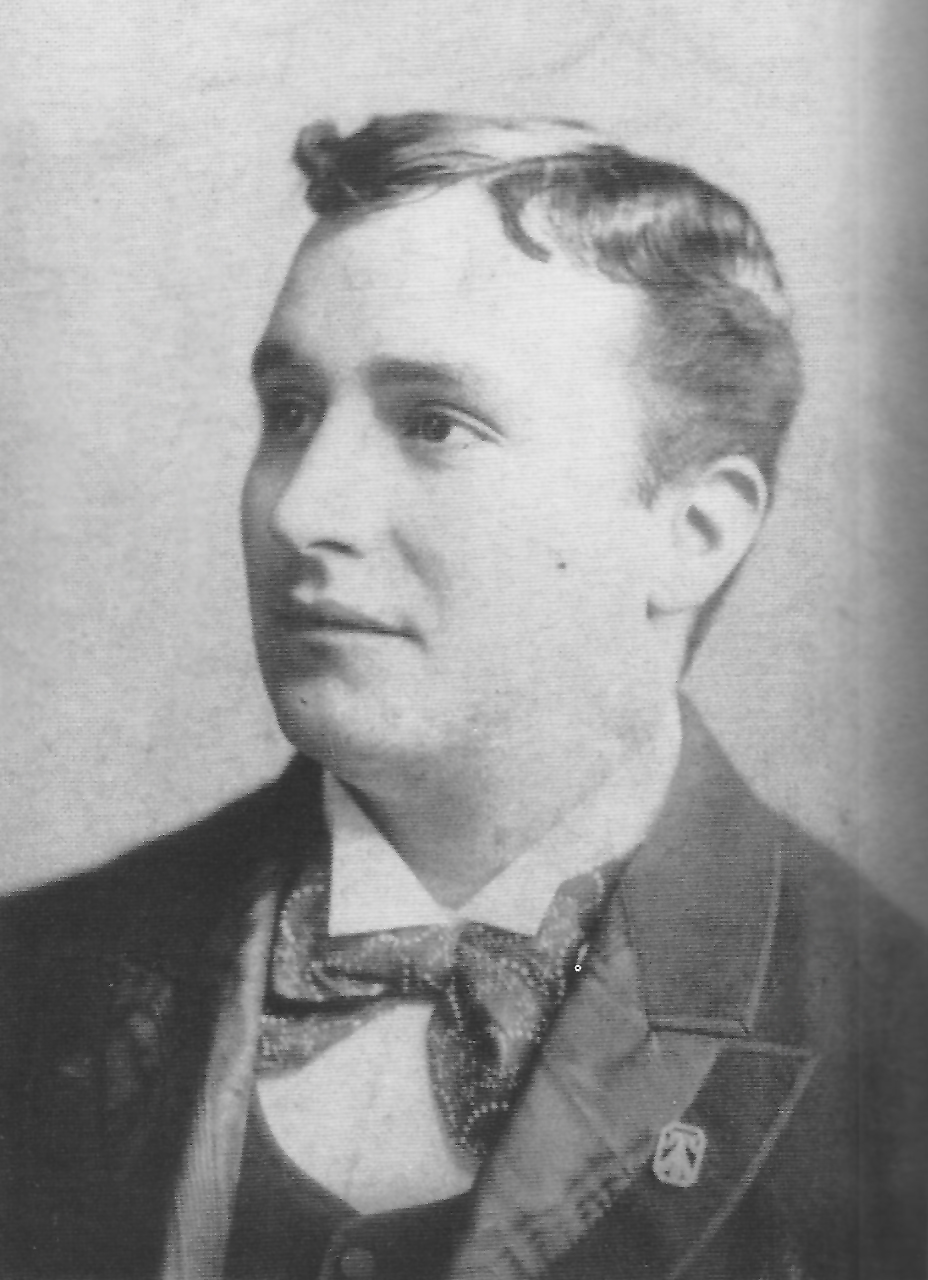
- Chaplin in 1885
- Born: Charles Spencer Chaplin; 18 March 1863; London, England
- Died: 9 May 1901 (aged 38); London, England
- Occupation: Singer
- Years active: 1887–1900
- Spouse: Hannah Chaplin (m. 1885; sep. 1891)
- Children: 3, including Charlie and Sydney (stepson)
- Relatives: See Chaplin family

Charles Spencer Chaplin Sr. (18 March 1863 – 9 May 1901) was an English music hall entertainer. He achieved considerable success in the 1890s, and was the father of the actor and filmmaker Sir Charlie Chaplin.

== Early years ==
Chaplin was born on 18 March 1863 in Marylebone, London. He was the third child of Spencer Chaplin and Ellen Elizabeth Smith; his siblings were Spencer William Tunstle, Ellen Kate, Blanche, Albert Frederick and Harry. Chaplin's father was a butcher, and he had a working-class upbringing. Little is known about Chaplin's early life, although the 1871 and 1881 censuses show his parents and family were living in Rillington Place in Notting Hill, the street in which the murderer John Christie later lived.

In June 1885, aged 22, he married 19-year-old Hannah Hill, who had been his "sweetheart" three years earlier when they starred in the same play. Hannah had a 3-month-old son, Sydney John, who was given Chaplin's surname. On 16 April 1889, Chaplin's biological son and namesake, Charles Spencer Jr. (known as Charlie), was born. Chaplin and Hannah separated by 1891, and remained legally married until his death.

== Music hall ==
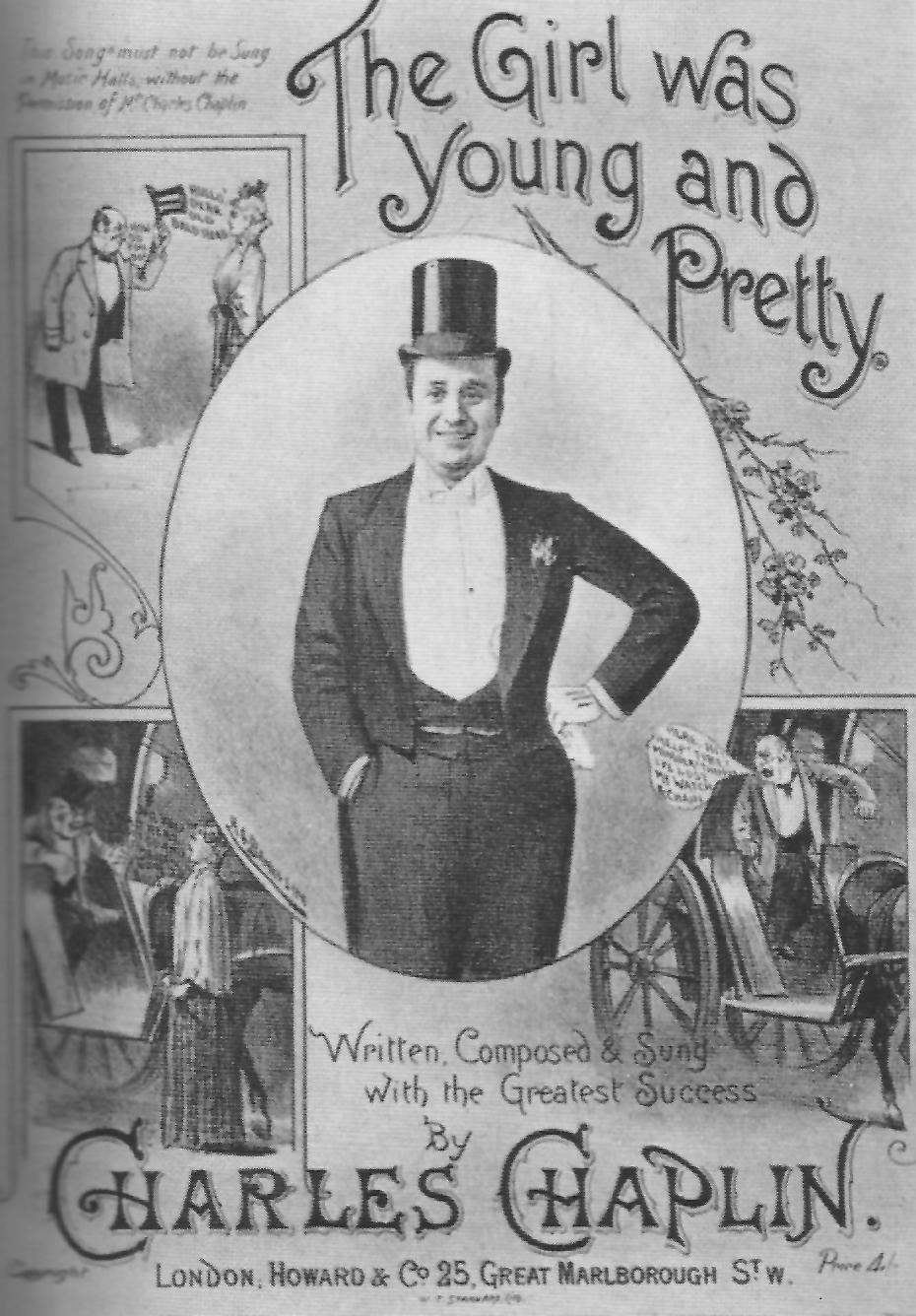
Sheet music cover for one of Chaplin's popular songs

Although there was no history of performing in his family, Chaplin was drawn to the music hall industry, which was thriving in 1880s South London. He first worked as a mimic, making his debut at the Poly Variety Theatre on 10 June 1887, but soon changed his act to that of a "dramatic and descriptive singer". He sang songs about the troubles of everyday life, such as nagging wives, mothers-in-law, and crying babies, and these were popular with audiences. By 1890, he was getting regular engagements. The music publishers Francis, Day and Hunter published three of his songs in 1890: 'As the Church Bells Chime', 'Everyday Life', and 'Eh, Boys?'.

Chaplin toured America in the summer of 1890, including extended engagements at the Union Square Theatre in New York City. Although he never reached the height of stars like Dan Leno and Herbert Campbell, Chaplin was successful enough to have his name and portrait printed on the cover of sheet music for songs with which he was associated. One of the songs he popularised was 'The Girl Was Young and Pretty'.

Chaplin's peak years were from 1890 to 1896 but, by 1897, he was still gaining work in the provinces. In 1898, he was still enough of a draw to share top-billing at the New Empire Palace Theatre in Leicester. His engagements began to decrease around this time, and his last known performance was at the Granville Theatre in Walham Green in September 1900.

== Relationship with Charlie Chaplin ==
Chaplin had no contact with his sons after he separated from Hannah, and did not provide financial support. Charlie Chaplin, writing in his memoirs 70 years later, recalled that he "was hardly aware of a father". This was despite the fact that they lived close to each other in Kennington. In 1896, Charlie and Sydney were admitted to a workhouse. Chaplin was contacted by the official authorities, to whom he stated that he would be willing to care for Charlie, but not Sydney. The Board of Guardians decided it was best to keep the brothers together, but ruled that Chaplin was legally responsible for both boys and ordered that he pay 15 shillings a week towards their joint maintenance. He did not pay any of this sum, so after a year Southwark Council issued an arrest warrant on Chaplin for neglecting to maintain his children. The arrest was avoided when Chaplin's brother Spencer provided the back payments.

Charlie and Sydney were re-admitted to a workhouse in July 1898, at which time the Board of Guardians tried to locate their father. They tracked him down in September, and the boys were discharged and put into Chaplin's care. Charlie was nine years old, and only remembered seeing his father twice before: once on the stage, and once when he passed him on the street in Kennington. Chaplin was living with a woman named Louise and their four-year-old son. He was a heavy alcoholic by this time, and was rarely at home. Louise was cruel to the children, and after shutting them out of the house one night they received a visit from the National Society for the Prevention of Cruelty to Children. The boys left Chaplin's care after two months, when their mother was released from a mental asylum. From this point onwards, Chaplin occasionally gave financial support to his sons.

Chaplin was responsible for introducing Charlie to the entertainment industry when, in 1899, he got him a role in The Eight Lancashire Lads clog dancing troupe, which was run by a friend. Charlie later recalled seeing his father in a pub a few weeks before his death; Chaplin was happy to see the boy, and warmly hugged and kissed him for the only time in his life.

== Death ==
The nature of music hall performing, whereby stars were expected to encourage customers to purchase drinks, led many in the industry to become alcoholics. Chaplin was one of these, and it was his heavy drinking that gradually brought an end to his career. By 1901, he was suffering from cirrhosis of the liver and dropsy. He was taken to St. Thomas's Hospital in Lambeth on 29 April, and died on 9 May 1901. He was 38 years old. Chaplin was penniless at the time of his death, and he nearly had a pauper's funeral until his younger brother Albert stepped in to pay the burial costs. The funeral took place at Lambeth Cemetery in Tooting on 13 May 1901. Both Hannah and Charlie Chaplin (then 12) attended.
