= The Chaplin Revue =

1959 film

- Theatrical release poster
- Directed by: Charlie Chaplin
- Starring: Charlie Chaplin
- Edited by: Paul Davies; Derek Parsons
- Production companies: Charles Chaplin Productions; Roy Export Company
- Distributed by: United Artists
- Release date: September 1, 1959
- Running time: 117 minutes
- Countries: United Kingdom; United States
- Language: English

The Chaplin Revue is a 1959 film comprising three silent films made by Charlie Chaplin. The three shorts included are A Dog's Life, Shoulder Arms, and The Pilgrim. All three star Chaplin's trademark character, The Tramp. For the 1959 release, Chaplin added a soundtrack to help appeal to modern audiences. Chaplin also added extra footage including clips from World War I to express the context. He provides a personal introduction to each of the clips.

Current releases of the compilation on DVD also feature other Chaplin films produced with First National, including The Idle Class, Pay Day, A Day's Pleasure, and Sunnyside, with Chaplin's 1918 propaganda short The Bond as a special feature. Introductions by David Robinson, and behind-the-scenes footage are also included.

== Background ==
During the silent era, Charlie Chaplin was one of the biggest stars in Hollywood. Unfortunately for Chaplin though, he fell victim to McCarthyism, and in the 1950s he lived in exile in Switzerland with his wife Oona O'Neill. His latest three films, Monsieur Verdoux, Limelight, and A King in New York, were not universally acclaimed, and his star power was fading. The idea of reviving his role as The Tramp for modern audiences was entertained. Chaplin had often used scenes featuring The Tramp, such as The Tramp's final appearance in Modern Times, as a vehicle for expressing his ideas. Critic and friend James Agee wrote a script placing Chaplin's trademark character, the Tramp, in apocalyptic New York City.

Chaplin decided the best way to bring the tramp into the new era was by re-releasing three silent films he made with First National as a feature-length film. Released in 1959, The Chaplin Revue consisted of A Dog's Life, Shoulder Arms, and The Pilgrim – each of which was introduced by Chaplin and juxtaposed with behind the scenes footage and clips from World War I.

== A Dog's Life ==
Charlie's tramp lives alone on the street. He persistently tries to get a job but there are none left at the employment agency when he gets there. Down and out, Charlie returns to the streets to find Scraps, a stray dog being attacked. He rescues her and the two form a bond. They fill the gap in each other's lives and they are no longer lonely – or hungry. Later, they attend a music hall where Edna Purviance is singing while being annoyed by the club's patrons. Charlie and Scraps are kicked out and Edna is fired. Scraps finds money in a lost wallet, which is then stolen by a pack of thieves. Charlie manages to thwart their theft and he, Scraps, and Edna enjoy their newfound happiness, together.

== Shoulder Arms ==
Originally released in the USA in October 1918, the relatively short black and white silent film ran for 46 minutes and finds Charlie playing the new recruit in the war effort against the Germans. Charlie has no friends and seems to make enemies with his allies at the drop of the hat. Through sheer dumb luck, Charlie stumbles into the enemy trenches and captures 13 German soldiers. After this "heroic" act, Charlie is given the duty of infiltrating enemy lines further under the guise of a tree trunk. His shining moment comes when he is hunted down by the Kaiser but with some quick thinking, reverses the ambush and captures the Kaiser for the allies. His fellow soldiers cheer him as a great wartime hero. He then awakes from his dream.

== The Pilgrim ==
An escaped convict (Chaplin) dons the vesture of a clergyman and is mistakenly appointed as the new pastor of the small town of Devil's Gulch. After acquainting himself with a local mother and daughter, and subsequently moving in with them, one of his former buddies from prison arrives and steals from the two women. Charlie tries to get their money back but his former life is discovered by the sheriff who takes him to the border of Mexico; facing life as a convict if he returns.

== Cast ==
Actor	A Dog's Life	Shoulder Arms	The Pilgrim
Charlie Chaplin	The Tramp	A Recruit	An escaped convict
Edna Purviance	Bar Singer	French Girl	Miss Brown
Syd Chaplin	Lunchwagon Owner	The Kaiser / Sergeant	Boy's Father / Eloper / Train Conductor
Henry Bergman	Unemployed man / Dance hall lady	Field Marshal / Bearded Officer / Fat man in Recruit's memories	Sheriff on train
Charles Reisner	Agency Clerk / Drummer / Traveling salesman	-	Crook
Albert Austin	Clerk / Thief	U.S. soldier / German soldier	-
Tom Wilson	Policeman	German sergeant / Instructor	-
Loyal Underwood	Unemployed man / Dance hall man	Short German Officer	Elder
Bud Jamison	Thief	-	-
Jack Wilson	-	Crown Prince	-
John Rand	-	German Soldier	-
J. Park Jones	-	U.S. Soldier	-
Tom Murray	-	-	Sheriff Bryan
Dean Riesner	-	-	Little Boy
Mai Wells	-	-	Little Boy's Mother
Mack Swain	-	-	Deacon
Kitty Bradbury	-	-	Mrs. Brown (Edna's Mother)
M.J. McCarthy	Unemployed man	-	-
Mel Brown	Unemployed man	-	-
Charles Force	Unemployed man	-	-
Bert Appling	Unemployed man	-	-
Thomas Riley	Unemployed man	-	-
Slim Cole	Unemployed man	-	-
Ted Edwards	Unemployed man	-	-
Louis Fitzroy	Unemployed man	-	-

== Crew ==
Credited for the 1959 release:

- Charles Chaplin - Director, Producer, Writer, Original Music
- Paul Davies - Editor
- Derek Parsons - Editor
- Bob Jones, Wally Milner, J.J.Y. Scarlett, Eric Stockl - Sound Recordists
- Eric James - Music Arranger
- Eric Rogers - Conductor
- Eric Spear - Music Arranger
- Jerome Epstein - Assistant to Mr. Chaplin

== Release dates ==
- UK: September 1, 1959
- Finland: December 25, 1959
- Denmark: July 28, 1960
- Germany: October 9, 1997:

== Reception ==
The Chaplin Revue was critically acclaimed when released in 1959. According to Top Ten Reviews, which gives ratings based on average critic scores, it is ranked:

- 88th – 1959
- 835th – 1950s
- 3,095th – comedy

Concerning the DVD release, reviewer Robert Horton says: "This box set is more than film history; it's a living treasure."

However, some reviewers have been critical of the re-release due to its format. To allow for a soundtrack, the original footage was stretched and certain frames were duplicated. Walter Kerr in The Silent Clowns declares that the "cadence of all three films, and of Chaplin's work in them, is utterly destroyed. Let no newcomer to the form begin acquaintance with Chaplin on such terms; only the originals will do."

Preceded by A King in New York; 1957	Films by Charlie Chaplin; The Chaplin Revue; 1959	Succeeded by A Countess from Hong Kong; 1967
