= The Adding Machine (film) =

1969 British film by Jerome Epstein

- Opening titles
- Directed by: Jerome Epstein
- Written by: Jerome Epstein
- Based on: The Adding Machine by Elmer Rice
- Produced by: Jerome Epstein
- Starring: Milo O'Shea; Phyllis Diller; Billie Whitelaw; Sydney Chaplin; Raymond Huntley
- Cinematography: Walter Lassally; Ronnie Fox Rogers
- Edited by: Gerry Hambling
- Music by: Mike Leander; Lambert Williamson
- Production company: Associated London Films
- Distributed by: Universal Pictures
- Release date: 23 September 1969
- Running time: 100 minutes
- Country: United Kingdom
- Language: English
- Budget: $500,000

The Adding Machine is a 1969 British fantasy comedy drama film produced, written, and directed by Jerome Epstein and starring Milo O'Shea, Phyllis Diller, Billie Whitelaw, Sydney Chaplin, and Raymond Huntley.

It was based on a stage production of the 1923 Elmer Rice play The Adding Machine directed by Epstein in Los Angeles in the 1940s. It was distributed in the United Kingdom by Universal Pictures.

The action of the film takes place on Earth, in 1930s Manhattan during the Great Depression, and in Heaven.

== Plot ==
Mr Zero is an accountant of twenty-five years standing whose job is about to be taken over by an adding machine. He murders his boss and is executed. He arrives in heaven and is put in charge of the heavenly adding machine. Thirty years pass and Zero is due to be sent back to earth, for the cycle to repeat.

== Cast ==
- Milo O'Shea as Mr. Zero
- Phyllis Diller as Mrs. Zero
- Billie Whitelaw as Daisy Devore
- Sydney Chaplin as Lieutenant Charles
- Julian Glover as Shrdlu
- Raymond Huntley as Smithers
- Phil Brown as Don
- Paddie O'Neil as Mabel
- Libby Morris as Ethel
- Hugh McDermott as Harry
- Bill Nagy as lawyer
- Carol Cleveland as Judy
- Bruce Boa as detective

== Production ==
The movie was shot at Shepperton Studios outside London. The film's sets were designed by the art director Jack Shampan.

== Reception ==
The Monthly Film Bulletin wrote: "This adaptation of Elmer Rice's 1923 play keeps fairly closely to the original text apart from two or three irrelevant additions. But though pleasant enough to watch, the film manages to miss most of the essential points of the play, which requires a much more stylised approach than the one Epstein has adopted. ... Though it is difficult to believe in Billie Whitelaw as a middleaged spinster who spends her time wondering what 'them kisses in the movies' are like, all five leading characters are well played, and the film is a charming one which its director has reportedly described as a 'labour of love'. But this love is also its weakness: a more compelling film could have been made from Rice's play if the theme, a sort of nightmare vision of mechanised robot man, had been treated less naturalistically and with far more satirical bite and savagery."

Roger Greenspun wrote in the New York Times: "Virtually everything in this movie version is a bad idea poorly realized. Epstein's direction is straight pre-New Wave academic, with absolutely regular cross-cutting punctuated by occasional lyrical montage to indicate imagination. He has softened the play a bit, added a dumb discourse on violence, added a needless prison scene for Phyllis Diller, and moved the Elysian Fields to an amusement park. For frumpy Daisy Devore, Zero's long-lost office romance, he has miscast Billie Whitelaw, who would still look ravishing if she dressed in cast iron and took ugly pills for a year. Indeed, each member of the distinguished cast is in his own way unsuitable."

Leslie Halliwell said: "Elmer Rice's satirical fantasy of the twenties is here robbed of its expressionist staging and presented naturalistically, a fatal error from which the film never for one moment recovers."
