= Follow That Man =

Follow That Man may refer to:

- Man Against Crime, also known as Follow That Man, a 1949 American TV series
- Follow That Man (1953 film), a French crime film
- Follow That Man (1961 film), a British comedy film
