= My American Wife =

My American Wife may refer to:

- My American Wife (1922 film), an American silent drama film
- My American Wife (1936 film), an American comedy film
