= Jerome Epstein (director) =

American filmmaker (1922–1991)

Jerome Leonard Epstein (January 17, 1922 – November 16, 1991) was an American director, screenwriter and producer known for his nearly 30-year professional collaboration and friendship with Charlie Chaplin and his son Sydney Chaplin.

== Early life ==
Epstein was born on January 17, 1922, in Cleveland, Ohio. Epstein's father had come to America in 1905 to escape anti-Jewish pogroms in Vilkomir, Lithuania. Epstein's childhood was spent in Brooklyn, New York. During World War II, Epstein served in the Army Air Corps.

After his military service, Epstein used the GI Bill to study drama at the University of California at Los Angeles (UCLA), where he met Sydney Chaplin, the second son of English actor Charlie Chaplin. After UCLA, his first job was as road manager for close harmony singing group The Andrews Sisters.

== Career ==
=== Circle Theater ===
In 1946, Epstein, Sydney Chaplin, actress Kathleen Freeman, and several UCLA students founded the Circle Theatre, now known as El Centro Theatre, in Hollywood. The troupe's first performances were held in a living room, but later moved to a converted corner store.

The theater became a meeting place for Hollywood's avant-garde. Contemporary comedic actors such as Charlie Chaplin, Groucho Marx, and Fanny Brice attended shows at the theater. Katharine Hepburn, George Cukor, and Edward G. Robinson were also frequent visitors. Chaplin was an enthusiastic supporter of the theater. He attended Sydney's performances in Elmer Rice's play The Adding Machine and also directed his son in three productions at the theater. Chaplin also helped Epstein obtain the rights to and direct Pulitzer Prize-winning playwright William Saroyan's 1949 play Sam Ego's House at the Circle Theater. According to Epstein, all that Chaplin asked in return for his assistance to the theater was "35 cents and a cup of black coffee."

=== Charlie Chaplin's assistant and collaborator ===
Epstein began working as Charlie Chaplin's assistant in 1951, working on Chaplin's Limelight. A movie executive counselled Epstein not to take a credit on Limelight, made during the period in which Chaplin had become a target of McCarthyism. Chaplin was thereafter banned from reentry into the United States unless he agreed to answer questions which he declined to do, and asked Epstein in 1952 to join him in Switzerland. Epstein would live in Europe for the rest of his life.

In Europe, Epstein teamed up with Chaplin as an associate producer on A King in New York, shot in London. During production, Epstein and Chaplin visited the places where Chaplin grew up. Epstein was listed as Chaplin's assistant in the crew listing for The Chaplin Revue in 1959.

Chaplin promoted Epstein to producer on A Countess from Hong Kong, the last film Chaplin directed. In 1968 and 1969, Epstein worked with Chaplin to produce the screenplay for The Freak, intended as a vehicle for Chaplin' daughter, Victoria. Epstein and Chaplin funded the prototype for the wings of Victoria's character, and Epstein worked with studios about casting and location scouting. The project was never made due to Chaplin's declining health.

Sydney Chaplin appeared in three Epstein projects, including films Follow That Man, A Countess From Hong Kong, and The Adding Machine, and Broadway plays Bells are Ringing.

== Later life ==
After Chaplin's death in 1977, Epstein worked to preserve the actor's legacy. Epstein provided the idea for film critic David Robinson's 1985 book Chaplin: His Life and Art, which was used as source material for the 1992 biographical film Chaplin. In 1989, on the 100th anniversary of Chaplin's birth, Epstein published the memoir Remembering Charlie. Epstein frequently hosted Chaplin's widow Oona and her children at his Vincent Square home. Epstein died on November 16, 1991, in London.

== Filmography ==
=== Film ===
Year	Title	Credited as			Notes
Year	Title	Producer	Writer	Director	Notes
1949	Search for Danger		Yes		Notes
1954	Votre dévoué Blak (Yours Truly, Blake)		Yes	Yes	French-language film
1955	King's Rhapsody		Yes		Adaptation of musical King's Rhapsody
1957	Le Grand Bluff		Yes		
1957	A King in New York	Yes			Uncredited. Chaplin's last film in a leading acting role.
1959	The Chaplin Revue				Credited as Chaplin's assistant.
1961	Follow that Man		Yes	Yes	
1967	A Countess from Hong Kong	Yes			Written and directed by Chaplin
1969	The Adding Machine	Yes	Yes	Yes	
1969	Two Gentlemen Sharing	Yes			Uncredited.

=== Television ===
Year	Title	Credited as			Notes
Year	Title	Producer	Writer	Director	Notes
1957	ITV Television Playhouse		Yes	Yes	1 episode as producer, 2 episodes as director
1960	My Heart's in the Highlands			Yes	Broadcast as part of The Play of the Week
1972	The Woman Hunter	Yes			1 episode

=== Broadway ===
Year	Title	Credited as			Notes
Year	Title	Producer	Writer	Director	Notes
1956	Bells are Ringing			Yes	

== Bibliography ==
- Remembering Charlie (1989), ISBN 978-0385262828
