= El Centro Theatre =

Theater in Hollywood, California

- Interactive map of El Centro Theatre
- Former names: The Circle
- Address: 804 N. El Centro Ave. Hollywood, California; United States
- Coordinates: 34.085541°N 118.324274°W
- Seating type: Reserved
- Type: Indoor theatre

Construction
- Opened: 1946

El Centro Theatre is a performing arts theater in Hollywood, California.

== History ==
In 1946, students from UCLA, including William Schallert, Jerry Epstein, Kathleen Freeman, Sid Rushakoff, and Sydney Earle Chaplin, moved on from their first location, a friend's living room, after their successful production of Elmer Rice's The Adding Machine. Their new location was a converted corner grocery store at Waring and El Centro Ave., which they named The Circle. The first play to be produced in the space was Ethan Frome, but they first had to clean and convert the dilapidated space into a workable theater. Bob Burns, their main lighting technician, coordinated the conversion with the help of newcomer Jack Kelly.

"The entire theatre movement in Los Angeles started in a Hollywood living room. Before that, there were only talent showcases and road shows. But it was The Circle Theatre that was the beginning of making Los Angeles a theatre town."- Patterson Greene, Theatre Arts, June 1961.

The cast of Ethan Frome, the first show performed at The Circle, was as follows:

Character	Actor
Harmon	Sydney Chaplin
A Young Man	George Englund
Ethan Frome	William Schallert
Zenobia Frome	Kathleen Freeman
Denis Eady	Sherridan Hall
Mattie Silver	Irene Gordon
Jonatham	Larry Salters
Ed Varnum	Julian Ludwig
Ethel	Jere Silvern
George	Charles Chaplin Jr.
Ned Hale	Jack Kelly
Ruth Varnum	Gloria Grant
Mrs. Hale	Ada Fremont

Charlie Chaplin allowed access to his props for the production. Comedic antics such as weekly cushion fights were commonplace. After the audience left, Sydney Chaplin or Bill Schallert could once be seen chasing Kathleen Freeman down the streets, while the children across the street at Hollygrove watched the ensuing mayhem. Marilyn Monroe stayed at Hollygrove as an orphan.

The next play to grace The Circle's stage was The Time of Your Life by William Saroyan. Sydney was in the show and at the time dating Marilyn Monroe, bringing her to watch rehearsals. Despite his patronage, The Time of Your Life was the first production that Charlie Chaplin attended. The next show was Love on the Dole. Then Saroyan sent his new script Sam's Ego House to The Circle. Saroyan made it to the show, along with Mrs. Clifford Odets and Edward G. Robinson.

The New Theatre (now the Chaplin Stage) was built in 1915 as one of the first silent picture movie theatres in Hollywood.

It was later used as an auto shop.

The Circle Theatre took over and converted the building for use as a second stage.

In the early 1950s and 60s, George Boroff ran the theatre, sending several plays to Broadway.

In 1955 Rachel Rosenthal created the experimental Instant Theatre in the space.

The theatre changed hands in the mid-1960s and housed many small companies until 1976 when Ted Schmitt took over the space.

In 2012 James Roday became the co-owner of the theatre. Roday, co-artistic director of the Red Dog Squadron theater company, and screen and stage vet Matt Shakman, purchased the theater for $800,000, saving it from a group that wanted to convert it into a tango parlor. After a series of unsuccessful renovations, Red Dog Squadron announced in an August 2018 newsletter that the theatre had been resold in early 2018.

The theater changed names many times over the years. It was originally named the Circle Theatre. It became The Cast under the supervision of Ted Schmitt, then the Theatre District under Macario Gaxiola, before it became known as The El Centro Theatre.
