= Lucky Carson =

1921 film by Wilfrid North

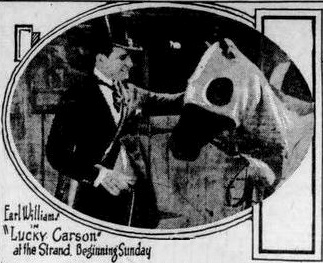
- Newspaper advertisement
- Directed by: Wilfrid North
- Written by: Bradley J. Smollen
- Based on: novel Salvage by Aquila Kempster
- Starring: Earle Williams; Earl Schenck; Betty Ross Clarke; Gertrude Astor
- Production company: Vitagraph Company of America
- Distributed by: Vitagraph Company of America
- Release date: December 18, 1921 (United States)
- Running time: 5 reels
- Country: United States
- Language: Silent (English intertitles)

Lucky Carson is a 1921 American silent drama film directed by Wilfrid North. It features Earle Williams, Earl Schenck, Betty Ross Clarke, Gertrude Astor, Collette Forbes, James Butler, and Loyal Underwood in the lead roles.

== Plot ==
As described in a film magazine, down and out John Peters (Williams) is about to jump into the Thames River, having lost a fortune he made at the race track. He changes his mind, however, and in an altercation with Rudolph Kluck (Schenck) strikes that gentleman down, loads him into a passing cab, and changes clothes with him. With the money he found on Kluck, he goes to the United States, taking on the name David Carson, and while passing through Madison Square accosts an out of work jockey sitting on a bench. The latter gives him a tip on the races and they become fast friends. Carson also plunges into Wall Street and corners the market in cotton. He saves Doris Bancroft (Clarke) from drowning and falls in love with her. Kluck again crosses his path and Carson gives him some tips on the stock market to atone for robbing him in London. Kluck has an affair with Russian writer Madame Marinoff (Astor) and asks Carson to shield him and secure a packet of letters that the Russian holds. Doris misinterprets Carson's interest in the Russian, but there is a happy ending when she learns the truth.

== Cast ==
- Earle Williams as John Peters / David 'Lucky' Carson
- Earl Schenck as Rudolph Kluck
- Betty Ross Clarke as Doris Bancroft
- Gertrude Astor as Madame Marinoff
- Collette Forbes as Edith Bancroft
- James Butler as Tommy Delmaer
- Loyal Underwood as "Runt" Sloan

== Preservation status ==
Lucky Carson is considered to be a lost film.
