= Follow That Man (1961 film) =

1961 British film by Jerome Epstein

- Directed by: Jerome Epstein
- Written by: Jerome Epstein
- Produced by: Jerome Epstein; Charles Leeds
- Starring: Sydney Chaplin; Dawn Addams; Elspeth March
- Edited by: Fred Burnley; Jim Connock
- Music by: Edwin Astley
- Production company: Epiney
- Distributed by: United Artists
- Release date: 1961
- Running time: 84 minutes
- Country: United Kingdom
- Language: English

Follow That Man is a 1961 British comedy film directed and written by Jerome Epstein and starring Sydney Chaplin, Dawn Addams and Elspeth March.

== Plot ==
When conman Eddie Miller hears that there is a missing heir to a Swedish fortune, he adopts the identity of the lost son and inveigles his way into the family. When the widowed mother discovers his true identity, she has already become so besotted with him that she wants to marry him. At the altar, Miller arranges for a friend to impersonate the real vicar, and escapes marriage.

== Cast ==
- Sydney Chaplin as Eddie Miller
- Dawn Addams as Janet Clark
- Elspeth March as Astrid Larsen
- Joan Heal as Harriet
- Peter Bull as Gustav
- Jack Melford as Lars Toren
- Gary Colleano as Axelrod
- May Hallatt as Nannie
- Philip Locke as vicar
- Mark Baker as Jack
- Janet Joye as Anna
- Nicholas Tannar as Olaf
- Roland Brand as Charlie
- Erik Chitty as doctor
- Brian Peck as newsboy
- Linda Castle as Jean
- Michael Barrington as hotel manager

== Production ==
The film's sets were designed by the art director William Hutchinson.

== Reception ==
The Monthly Film Bulletin wrote: "The comedy idea of an aging merry widow who falls for her "son" might have been ghoulishly amusing under the care of a Wilder or a Lubitsch. As it is, the laboured treatment, the tedious hamming and clowning and the ersatz staging merely accentuate the film's prevailing unpleasantness."

Kine Weekly wrote: "Romantic Comedy, 'embellished' by slapstick. ... The tale is supposed to unfold in Sweden, but its characters are, with few exceptions, borrowed from time-honoured English stage farce. An occasional laugh is raised when it finally descends to knockabout, but transparent preliminaries will make other than undemanding yawn. ... The picture has a bright Charleston sequence and a hectic finale, but otherwise 'bounds' from one tired cliche to another with somnambulistic predictability. Sydney Chaplin works hard as Eddie, but is definitely not in his father's class, Dawn Addams makes a very skittish Janet, and Elspeth March 'hams' as the ample Astrid. The rest are merely stooges. Its staging is by no means cramped, but unmistakably ersatz."

== Bibliography ==
- Brian McFarlane & Anthony Slide. The Encyclopedia of British Film: Fourth Edition. Oxford University Press, 2013.
- Howard Maxford. Hammer Complete: The Films, the Personnel, the Company. McFarland, 2018.
