= Lita Grey =

American actress (1908–1995)

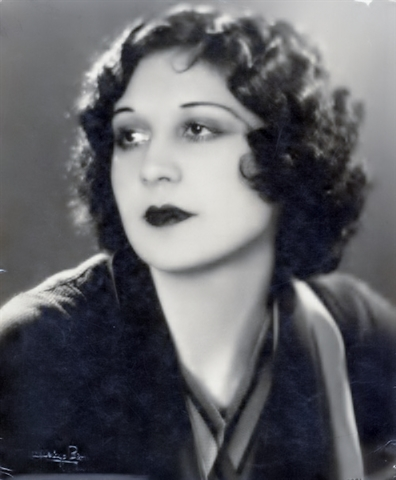
- Grey in 1925
- Born: Lillita Louise MacMurray; April 15, 1908; Los Angeles, California, U.S.
- Died: December 29, 1995 (aged 87); Los Angeles, California, U.S.
- Resting place: Valhalla Memorial Park Cemetery
- Occupation: Actress
- Spouses: Charlie Chaplin (m. 1924; div. 1927) Henry Aguirre (m. 1936; div. 1938) Arthur Day (m. 1938; div. 1948) Patsy Pizzolongo (m. 1956; div. 1966)
- Children: 3, including Charles Jr. and Sydney

Lita Grey (born Lillita Louise MacMurray, April 15, 1908 – December 29, 1995), who was known for most of her life as Lita Grey Chaplin, was an American actress. She was the second wife of Charlie Chaplin, and appeared in his films The Kid, The Idle Class, and The Gold Rush.

== Background ==
She was born in Hollywood, California, to Lillian Carrillo Curry Grey and Robert Earl McMurray, and christened Lillita Louise MacMurray. Her father was of Scottish descent, and her mother's family was descended from a ninth-generation Californio family, whose lineage included Antonio Maria Lugo. The Lugos were mostly of Native American ancestry, but had an ancestor that originated from the region of Andalusia in Spain, and were one of the first families to bring horses into North America. In a 1993 interview, Grey claimed to be a great-grandniece of former California governor Henry Gage.

== Life and career ==
Grey married four times. By her own account, she first met Charlie Chaplin at the age of eight at a Hollywood café, and first worked with him at the age of 12 in the part of the "flirting angel" in The Kid. She also appeared briefly as a maid in The Idle Class. Her one-year contract was not renewed. At the age of 15, she met Chaplin again when she heard he was testing brunettes for his next film The Gold Rush. Still only 15, she was initially cast as the leading lady in the film, and then-35-year-old Chaplin started a relationship with Grey.

When Lita collapsed on the set of The Gold Rush, she was found to be 2 months pregnant. Her uncle, San Francisco lawyer, Edwin McMurray advised Chaplin that as Lita was a minor, her pregnancy could lead to him being charged with statutory rape. There was also speculation over Lillian's role and motives in her daughter's relationship with Chaplin. In an interview with the LA times in 1992, Lita stated: "My mother was in a peculiar position. My grandfather forced the marriage--he was threatening to kill Charlie--and my mother and I were kind of frightened of my grandfather. Mama was mixed up. She also hero-worshiped Charlie and was really shocked when she found out we had been intimate. Charlie would keep her in a good mood--'Don’t worry, if Lita becomes pregnant I'll marry her.' " They married 24 November 1924 in secret in Empalme, Sonora, Mexico, to avoid a scandal. She alleged in her divorce complaint that he "sought to have her undergo an illegal operation to prevent the birth of their first child".

They had two sons, Charles Chaplin Jr. and Sydney Chaplin, born within ten months of each other in May 1925 and March 1926, respectively.

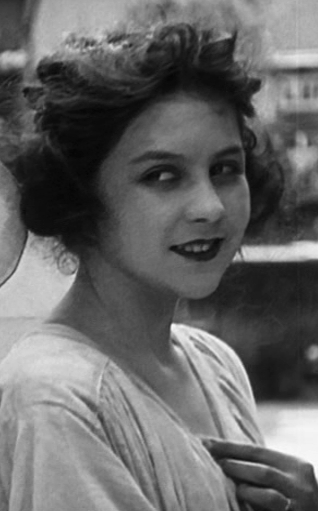
Grey in The Kid (1921)

The marriage was troubled from the start. The two had few interests in common, and Chaplin spent as much time as he could away from home, neglecting both his wife and his children, while working on The Gold Rush, and later, The Circus. They divorced on August 22, 1927, due to his alleged numerous affairs with other women, and he was ordered to pay over US$600,000 ($11.1 million in 2025 dollars) and US$100,000 ($1.9 million in 2025 dollars) in trust for each child, the largest divorce settlement at the time. Copies of her lengthy divorce complaint, which made scandalous sexual claims against Chaplin, were published, and publicly sold, and the divorce became a sensational media event. Less than five months after the divorce, Grey's former butler Don Solovich was murdered in Utah, and articles speculated about connections between Chaplin and the murder.

After the divorce she began a successful singing career, working with Milton Berle, and working at the Stork Club and London's Cafe de Paris. She married Henry Aguirre in September 1936, then Arthur Day in May 1938, both marriages were short-lived. The Chaplin divorce and the notoriety that came with it took their toll and she began drinking heavily, squandered the divorce settlement, had a major breakdown, and by 1943 she had hit rock bottom. The 1940 United States census states that Lita and Arthur lived at 38 East 50th Street in New York City, and that in 1935 she had lived in England. The census listed her occupation as "singer", and Arthur's as "manager personal". Lita and Arthur adopted a baby boy in 1940, whom they named Robert. When they split up in 1946, Bobby went to live with his paternal grandmother, and Lita had little contact with him after that.

She married her fourth husband, Patsy Pizzolongo (aka Pat Longo), on September 22, 1956, in Los Angeles, California. They were divorced in June 1966.

In the 1970s and 1980s, she worked as a clerk at Robinson's Department Store in Beverly Hills. She wrote two autobiographical volumes covering her life with Chaplin. My Life with Chaplin (1966) was, by her own admission, largely a work of exaggeration and fabrication. She claimed to tell the story as it really was in her second memoir, Wife of the Life of the Party (1998). She is portrayed by Deborah Moore in the 1992 film Chaplin, but Grey was depicted on screen for less than a minute in the final film.

== Death ==
She died of cancer on December 29, 1995, in Los Angeles, aged 87, and was buried in Valhalla Memorial Park Cemetery.

== Filmography ==
Year	Title	Role	Note
1921	The Kid	Flirtatious Angel	Uncredited
1921	The Idle Class	Maid	Uncredited
1925	The Gold Rush	Extra	Uncredited
1933	Seasoned Greetings	Store Owner	Short
1933	Mr. Broadway	Lita Grey	
1949	The Devil's Sleep	Judge Rosalind Ballentine	
1953	This Is Your Life	Herself	Television, one episode
1979	The Hollywood Greats	Herself	Television, one episode
1983	Unknown Chaplin	Herself	Television film

== Written works ==
- "Complaint of the young movie star against her elderly husband : (and famous film magnate)". search.worldcat.org. OCLC 1051461671.
- Chaplin, Lita; Cooper, Morton (1966). My life with Chaplin; an intimate memoir. Bernard Geis Associates. OCLC 1304298.
- Chaplin, Lita; Vance, Jeffrey (1998). Wife of the Life of the Party. Scarecrow Press. ISBN 9780810834323. OCLC 1064282220.
