= Murder of Don Solovich =

1928 murder of a wealthy queer person in central Utah

Don L. Solovich (6 April 1892 – 6 January 1928) was a gay man formerly from Austria-Hungary employed by famed actor Charlie Chaplin who was murdered by Sheldon Clark in 1928. The murder trial made international headlines.

== Perpetrator ==
Sheldon Reid Clark was 22 in 1927, making his birth year c. 1905. He was from Manti, Utah, was raised in the Church of Jesus Christ of Latter-day Saints, and was baptized on July 20, 1915. He aspired to be an actor in Hollywood.

== Victim ==
Don L. Solovich
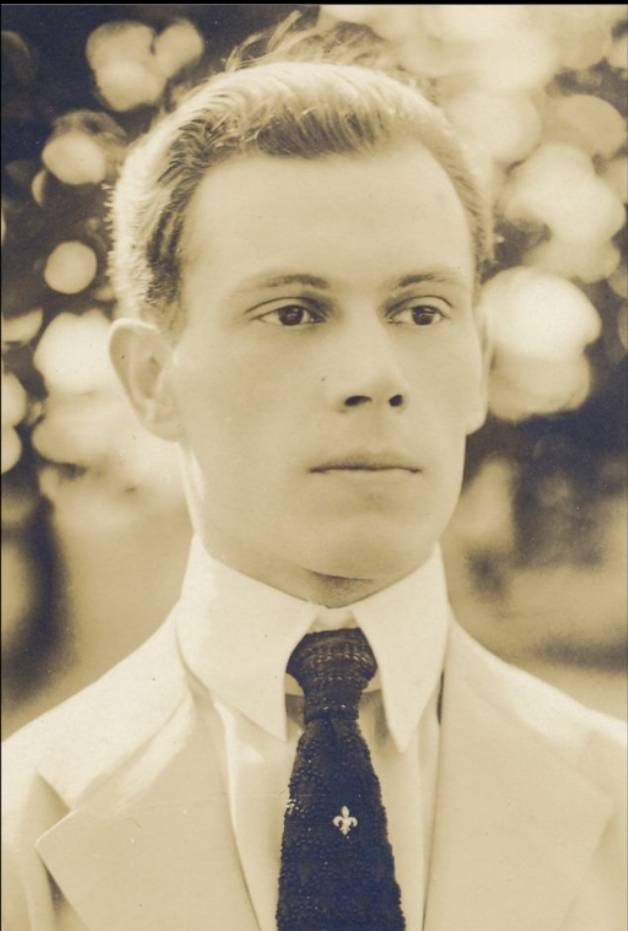
- Born: April 6, 1892; Topla, near Herceg Novi
- Died: January 6, 1928 (aged 35) near Gunnison, Utah
- Cause of death: Murdered with a hammer
- Body discovered: January 6, 1928 39.1776°N 111.8383°W
- Burial place: Manti, Utah; 39.2765°N 111.6339°W
- Other name: Dusan Ljubo Sabovic
- Occupations: Waiter, dancer, butler, actor
- Employer(s): Charlie Chaplin, Lita Grey
- Organization: Charlie Chaplin Studios

Don Solovich was born Dusan Ljubo Sabovic in Topla, a village near Herceg Novi, Austria-Hungary (modern-day Montenegro) to a Serbian-speaking family. When he was 16, he moved to the United States in order to avoid fighting in World War I. Later, in Los Angeles, he adopted the Americanized stage name Don Solovich, which he went by for the rest of his life. While in Los Angeles, he worked as a waiter, sometimes dressed in drag, and possessed hundreds of letters from a Tom Harrington, the letters expressing a "more than ordinary affection" to him. Solovich was also employed at Charlie Chaplin's film studio, where he performed as an opera ballet dancer and an extra in twelve films, and he worked as a butler for Chaplin and his wife Lita Grey.

In 1923, Solovich was attacked and robbed of $80 ($1,500 in 2025) by Macon Irby. Irby attempted to use the gay panic defense to justify his act, but was convicted of two counts of robbery. By 1927, Solovich was boarding in the house of the parents of Sheldon Reid Clark. Clark later stated that Solovich said he "was a woman in nature" and dated men, which was illegal at the time.

== Murder and trial ==
Clark alleged that Solovich and Chaplin were lovers, that Chaplin was upset with Solovich because Solovich may have had blackmail material that Grey could use during her and Chaplin's divorce, and that Solovich had recently received thousands of dollars from Chaplin over the divorce. Clark also claimed that Solovich had told him he was related to French royalty and would inherit a large sum of money, while Grey claimed Solovich blackmailed her. Furthermore, a Los Angeles County shopkeeper accused Solovich and Clark of stealing $2,000 ($37,500 in 2025) worth of jewelry a few days before Solovich's murder.

A prosecution attorney stated that a source had told them Solovich feared for his safety, decided to leave Los Angeles, and hired Clark to drive him and a large amount of luggage to Utah. While in Utah, Clark struck Solovich with a hammer three times in the face and three times on the back of the head. Clark then took Solovich's possessions, including his car, a $5000 ring, $2000 in cash, and possibly divorce depositions from Chaplin and Grey, and drove to Salt Lake City. Clark alleged that he struck Solovich because Solovich had become abusive and attacked him.

Clark was convicted of aggravated manslaughter and sentenced to a few years in prison. After the trial, the judge reported that he believed Clark should have been found guilty of first-degree murder.

== See also ==
- LGBT rights in California
- LGBT rights in Utah
- Homosexuality and the LDS Church
- LGBT culture in Los Angeles
