= Loyal Underwood =

American actor

- Born: August 6, 1893; Rockford, Illinois
- Died: September 30, 1966 (aged 73); Los Angeles, California

Loyal Underwood (August 6, 1893 – September 30, 1966) was an American stock actor for Charlie Chaplin's film studio.

== Biography ==
Born in 1893 in Rockford, Illinois, Underwood's movie debut was in The Count, a 1916 Chaplin short film created for the Mutual Film Corporation. Underwood is uncredited as he was for the four other Mutual shorts in which he appeared.

In 1918, Chaplin started work for First National and Loyal Underwood was on hand. He was credited and appeared in all seven First National Shorts which Chaplin directed.

Underwood was a short man. Next to the short Chaplin at 5 ft 5 in (165 cm), he appeared puny and weak. Hence, the comedy of a situation in which such a man is the antagonist; Chaplin's character routinely shrugged him off.

Between 1921 and 1927, Underwood appeared in several other lesser known films. In the next twenty years, he was again appearing uncredited in films, such as Arizona Bad Man, Let's Dance and The Paleface.

In 1928, Underwood worked as a writer and director at radio station KNX in Los Angeles.

Underwood's final film was a credited role, albeit a small one, as a street musician in Chaplin's final American film Limelight in 1952.

Underwood died in Los Angeles on September 30, 1966, in Southern California, and is buried in the Sheltering Hills section at Forest Lawn - Hollywood Hills Cemetery in Los Angeles, California. He was 73. Decades after his death, he lies in a still-unmarked curbside grave.

== Filmography ==
Year	Title	Role	Notes
1916	The Count	Small Guest	Short, Uncredited
1918	A Dog's Life	Man in Dance Hall	Short, Uncredited
1918	Shoulder Arms	Short German Officer	
1919	Sunnyside	Fat Boy's Father	Short, Uncredited
1919	A Day's Pleasure	Angry Little Man in Street	Short, Uncredited
1919	The Professor	Flophouse Proprietor	Short, Uncredited
1921	The Man Who Woke Up		Writer
1921	Lucky Carson	'Runt' Sloan	
1922	Pay Day	Workman #3	Short
1922	My American Wife	Danny O'Hare	
1923	The Pilgrim	Small Deacon	
1924	The Dixie Handicap	Losing Jones	
1927	Shootin' Irons	Blinky	
1935	Arizona Bad Man	Square Dance Caller	Uncredited
1935	Fighting Caballero	Musician	Uncredited
1948	Isn't It Romantic?	Townsman	Uncredited
1948	The Paleface	Bearded Character	Uncredited
1950	Let's Dance	Cowboy	Uncredited
1951	My Favorite Spy	Beggar	Uncredited
1952	Limelight	Street Musician	(final film role)
