= Stairs to the Roof =

Stairs to the Roof is a play by Tennessee Williams, the last of his apprentice plays. It was completed in December 1941, and premiered (as a full-scale production) at the Pasadena Playhouse on February 26, 1947.

The play is based on earlier stories written by Williams, including "The Swan" and most specifically, one of the same title written in October 1936, after he had recovered from a nervous breakdown arising from his experiences working in the relentlessly mechanical world of the large International Shoes factory in St. Louis, Missouri. Unlike that story, the play is optimistic, with elements of romance and fantasy, and a deus ex machina ending.

The subtitle of the play (and of the earlier story) is "A Prayer for the Wild of Heart That are Kept in Cages"; though that phrase conveys the seriousness of the playwright's chosen topic, its treatment, particularly the elements not present in the original story (such as the Mummers play-within-a-play and the swan-on-a-lake scenes), lighten the tone with elements of fantasy.

Williams scholar Allean Hale, in his introduction to a 2000 New Directions Publishers edition of the play (ISBN 0-8112-1435-4), commented on similarities the play shares with the 1923 expressionist play The Adding Machine by Elmer Rice. Both plays show the robotic typing of office workers, both have a scene of divine intervention and another set by a lake, and both make use of generically named characters (Rice's male lead is "Mr. Zero"; Williams' female lead is "Girl"; Rice has Messrs. One, Two, Three, etc.; Williams' has Messrs. P, D, Q, T).

== Playwright's comments ==
In "Random Observations" written as a preface in 1941, Williams noted that the play was "written for both the stage and the screen" with Burgess Meredith in mind as the protagonist. He acknowledges the play's "didactic material" as being perhaps inappropriate as the country was preparing to go to war, but he felt his protagonist's problems were "universal and everlasting", an assessment that made the play appropriate even during such a trying time.

Six years later, in remarks published in the Pasadena Playhouse program notes, Williams commented on the play:

When I look back at Stairs to the Roof...I see its faults very plainly, as plainly as you may see them, but still I do not feel apologetic about this play. Unskilled and awkward as I was at this initial period of my playwriting, I certainly had a moral earnestness which I cannot boast of today, and I think that moral earnestness is a good thing for any times, but particularly for these times. I wish I still had the idealistic passion of [protagonist] Benjamin Murphy! You may smile as I do at the sometimes sophomoric aspect of his excitement, but I hope you will respect, as I do, the purity of his feeling and the honest concern which he had in his heart for the basic problem of mankind, which is to dignify our lives with a certain freedom.
