= The Dixie Handicap =

1924 film by Reginald Barker

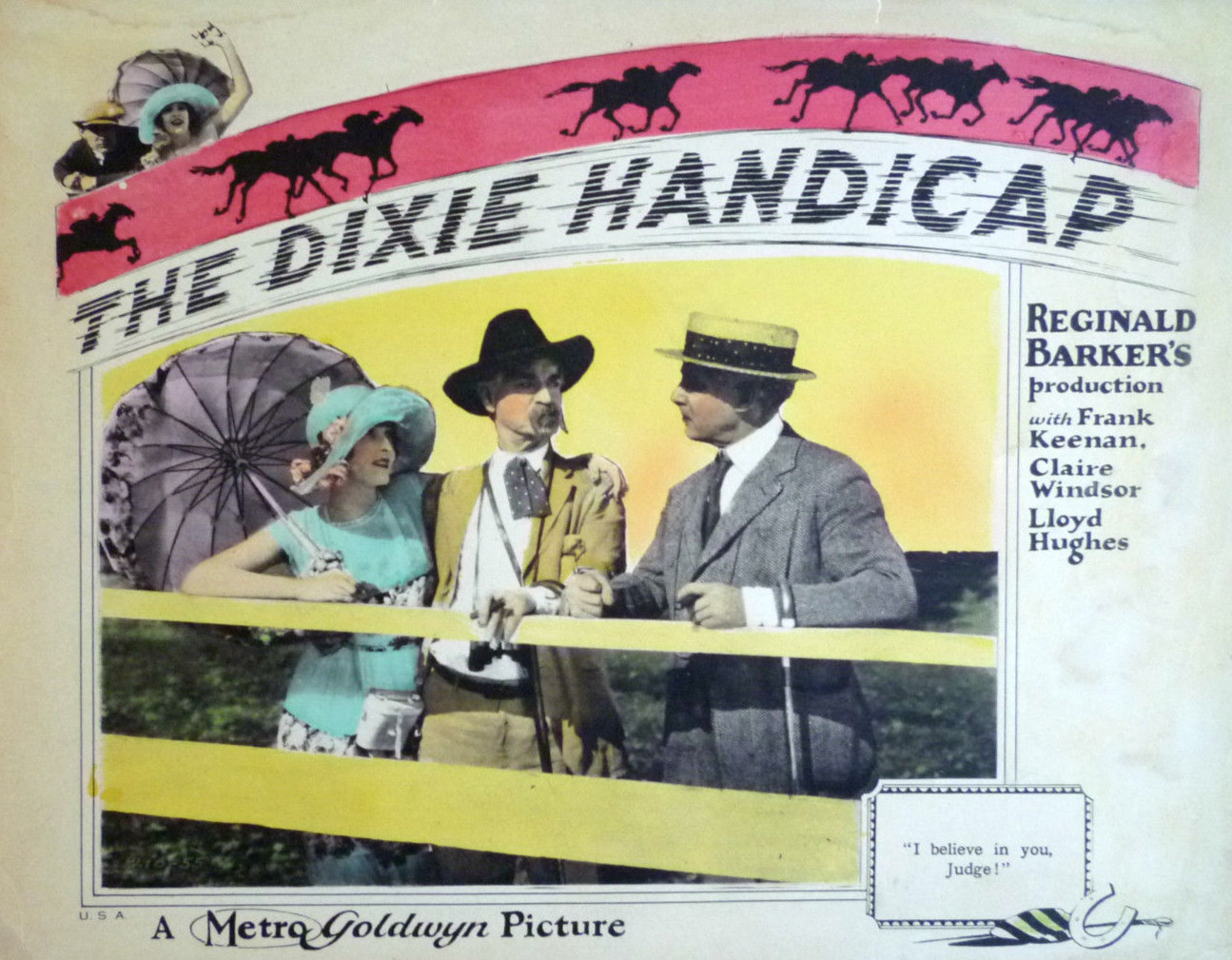
- Lobby card
- Directed by: Reginald Barker
- Written by: Waldemar Young
- Based on: "Dixie" by Gerald Beaumont
- Produced by: Louis B. Mayer
- Starring: Claire Windsor; Lloyd Hughes; Otis Harlan
- Cinematography: Percy Hilburn (*French)
- Edited by: Daniel J. Gray
- Distributed by: Metro-Goldwyn Pictures
- Release date: December 29, 1924
- Running time: 7 reels
- Country: United States
- Language: Silent (English intertitles)
- Budget: $153,000
- Box office: $447,000

The Dixie Handicap is a 1924 American silent drama film directed by Reginald Barker. The film stars Claire Windsor, Lloyd Hughes, and Otis Harlan. It is written by Waldemar Young.

== Plot ==
As described in a review in a film magazine, Judge Roberts, greatly reduced in circumstances, hides his true financial condition from his daughter Virginia. He raises her in luxury by continuingly selling parts of his estate, until all he has left are his old home and his racing mare Southern Melody, who is about to have a colt. Through the carelessness of a stable boy, the mare wanders away and the colt is born in a rainstorm and nearly dies from exposure. When a wild cat attacks, the mare gives her life to save her colt. Dexter, trainer for a millionaire who owns an adjacent training stable, loves Virginia and tells her of her father's poverty. To counteract this, the Judge sells the colt and sends his daughter to Europe. The colt, now named Dixie, is badly injured in its first race, and, when it is about to be shot, Johnny Sheridan begs permission to try and save it. Virginia returns from Europe just as the great Dixie Handicap is to be run, in which the colt Dixie is entered. She learns that her father has sacrificed all and is now living in poverty. Dixie comes from behind and wins the race and a purse of $50,000. The estate is restored and Virginia, thoroughly chastened, agrees to marry Johnny, who has always loved her.

== Cast ==
- Claire Windsor as The Daughter, Virginia
- Frank Keenan as The Racehorse Owner, Judge Roberts
- Lloyd Hughes as The Hero, Johnny Sheridan
- John St. Polis as Dexter (credited as Johnny Sainpolis)
- Otis Harlan as The Old Retainer
- Joseph Morrison as The Errant Groom
- Otto Hoffman as The Major
- Edward Martindel as Mr. Bosworth
- Ruth King as Mrs. Bosworth
- Billy Quirk as A Tout (credited as William Quirk)
- James Quinn as A Tout
- Loyal Underwood as Losing Jones
- Bert Lindley as Conductor
- William Orlamond as Sheriff
- Milton Ross as Constable
- J. P. Lockney as Milkman

== Production ==
The race was filmed at the Latonia Race Track, formerly located at Covington, Kentucky. The character The Old Retainer, a humorous butler for the old house, is played by Otis Harlan in blackface. The use of blackface characters in Hollywood films did not decline until the 1940s when public sensibilities regarding race began to change and blackface became increasingly associated with racism and bigotry.

== Preservation ==
With no prints of The Dixie Handicap located in any film archives, it is a lost film.
