= A Countess from Hong Kong =

1966 British film by Charlie Chaplin

- Theatrical release poster
- Directed by: Charlie Chaplin
- Written by: Charlie Chaplin
- Produced by: Jerome Epstein
- Starring: Marlon Brando; Sophia Loren; Sydney Chaplin; Tippi Hedren; Patrick Cargill; Margaret Rutherford
- Cinematography: Arthur Ibbetson
- Edited by: Gordon Hales
- Music by: Charlie Chaplin
- Production companies: Chaplin Film Productions, Ltd. Universal Pictures
- Distributed by: Rank Film Distributors (UK)
- Release dates: 5 January 1967 (London, premiere)
- Running time: 107 minutes
- Country: United Kingdom
- Language: English
- Budget: $3.5 million (estimated)
- Box office: $1.1 million (United States and Canada Rentals)

A Countess from Hong Kong is a 1967 British romantic comedy film written, directed, and scored by Charlie Chaplin, his final work as a filmmaker. The film starred Marlon Brando and Sophia Loren, and revolved around an American diplomat who falls in love with a stowaway on a cruise. Sydney Chaplin (Chaplin's son), Tippi Hedren, Patrick Cargill and Margaret Rutherford co-star in major supporting roles, Chaplin also made a cameo, marking his final screen appearance. This is the first and only production of Chaplin's filmography to be in color.

== Plot ==
Ogden Mears is a wealthy American diplomat traveling by ocean liner to take up a post in Saudi Arabia. Following a drunken final night in Hong Kong, he discovers Natascha, a White Russian émigré and former dance-hall hostess, hiding in his cabin's closet. Natascha, who is stateless and lacks a passport, has stowed away in a desperate attempt to reach the United States. Ogden's primary motivation is to protect his reputation and impending diplomatic appointment; if he is caught with a stowaway in his cabin, his career will be ruined.

To solve the crisis, Ogden and his valet, Hudson, concoct a plan to keep Natascha hidden from the crew and other passengers. The conflict arises from the constant threat of discovery during inspections and social visits. Eventually, to get her off the ship and provide her with legal status, Ogden arranges a marriage of convenience between Natascha and Hudson.

While Ogden and Natascha eventually fall in love, the narrative focus remains on the comedic tension of her hiding and the logistical hurdles of her statelessness. The film ends with Ogden choosing to abandon his high-society life and diplomatic career to remain with Natascha in Hawaii.

== Cast ==
- Marlon Brando as Ogden
- Sophia Loren as Natascha
- Sydney Chaplin as Harvey
- Tippi Hedren as Martha
- Patrick Cargill as Hudson
- Michael Medwin as John Felix
- Oliver Johnston as Clark, a director of Mears' oil company
- John Paul as The Captain
- Angela Scoular as The Society Girl
- Margaret Rutherford as Gaulswallow
- Bill Nagy as Crawford
- Dilys Laye as Saleswoman

In addition, Charlie Chaplin briefly appears as an Old Steward, while his daughters Geraldine, Josephine and Victoria make brief appearances as Girl at Dance (on the ship) and as Two Young Girls (entering the Waikiki Hotel), respectively. Hong Kong actor Richard Ng had a minor walk on role in this film and during his early acting career in the UK in the 1960s.

== Production ==
The story is based loosely on the life of Russian singer and dancer Moussia "Skaya" Sodskaya, whom Chaplin met in France in 1921. Chaplin described their encounter in his 1922 book My Trip Abroad, calling her a former aristocrat and "a stateless person marooned in France without a passport."

The film had been in development since the 1930s under the title Stowaway, as a vehicle for Chaplin's then wife Paulette Goddard. However, following their divorce in 1942 and subsequent events in his life, Chaplin continued working on it until it was ready for production in the mid-1960s.

It was ultimately his only film in colour, and one of two films Chaplin directed in which he did not play a major role (the other being 1923's A Woman of Paris).

The idea, according to a press release written by Chaplin, "resulted from a visit I made to Shanghai in 1931 where I came across a number of titled aristocrats who had escaped the Russian Revolution. They were destitute and without a country, their status was of the lowest grade. The men ran rickshaws and the women worked in ten-cent dance halls. When the Second World War broke out many of the old aristocrats had died and the younger generation migrated to Hong Kong where their plight was even worse, for Hong Kong was overcrowded with refugees." Chaplin had written a draft of the script in the 1930s under the working title The Stowaway, as a starring vehicle for his then-wife Paulette Goddard. However, amidst work for The Great Dictator, Goddard signed a contract with Paramount Pictures, and left Chaplin the following year. Although Chaplin and Goddard agreed to make one more film together in their divorce settlement, the idea never materialized. In the years after, Chaplin worked on the script in increments, "adding a bit here, cutting a bit there."

In 1963, a friend of Chaplin suggested to him Sophia Loren for the lead role of Natascha, the Russian princess. For the character of Ogden, he originally wanted Rex Harrison or Cary Grant to play the role, but eventually Marlon Brando was cast. By 1965, both Brando and Sophia Loren committed to the film without reading a script. Tippi Hedren, who broke with Alfred Hitchcock, also signed on for the film without reading the script, and was disappointed to learn the insignificance of her role. Although Chaplin tried to accommodate her, he could not, as the story mostly takes place on a ship that Hedren's character boards near the end of the film. In the end, she remained in the film and later said that it was a pleasure working for him. Chaplin cast his son Sydney in a supporting role, as well as his three eldest daughters in cameo appearances: Geraldine (at minutes 46 and 65), Josephine and Victoria Chaplin (at minute 92).

Production began on 25 January 1966 at Pinewood Studios in Buckinghamshire, just outside London. The film was the second of Universal's European unit, following Fahrenheit 451. Production was frequently interrupted by Brando arriving late and then being hospitalized with appendicitis, Chaplin and Brando having the flu, and Loren marrying Carlo Ponti.

Hedren described Chaplin's directorial technique in the following way: "Chaplin’s method was to act out all our different roles, which was brilliant to watch. Instead of directing, he’d get out there on set and say: 'OK, do this,' and show us how. He’d become Sophia Loren. He’d become me and Marlon. It was really unusual and I’d never seen it happen before." Although many members of the cast appreciated Chaplin's approach, Marlon Brando felt insulted and wanted to quit before Chaplin was able to persuade him to finish the picture. Brando came to consider Chaplin a "fearsomely cruel man," claiming that Chaplin "was an egotistical tyrant and a penny-pincher. He harassed people when they were late, and scolded them unmercifully to work faster." Brando was particularly angered by what he regarded as the cruel way that Chaplin treated his son Sydney, who had a supporting role in the picture: "Chaplin was probably the most sadistic man I’d ever met."

== Soundtrack ==
The success of the music score - which Chaplin worked on with Lambert Williamson - was able to cover the budget.

The film's theme song, "This Is My Song", written by Chaplin and performed by Petula Clark, became a worldwide success, topping the charts in the United Kingdom, Ireland, Australia, the Netherlands and Belgium, while reaching number three in the United States and number four in Canada.

== Reception ==
The film received largely negative reviews. On the review aggregator website Rotten Tomatoes, 43% of 7 critics' reviews are positive, with an average rating of 4.7/10.

The film premiered in London on 5 January 1967, receiving negative reviews from critics. Although a major success in Europe and Japan, it still underperformed at the US box office.

=== Contemporary reviews ===
- The New York Times review for 17 March 1967 stated: "...if an old fan of Mr. Chaplin's movies could have his charitable way, he would draw the curtain fast on this embarrassment and pretend it never occurred".
- American critic Andrew Sarris, in one of the rare positive reviews of the film, wrote that “[a]ttacks on Chaplin for his sentimentality and/or vulgarity date back almost to the beginning of his career. [...] People who attack A Countess from Hong Kong in the name of the Chaplin they once allegedly loved have probably forgotten what Chaplin was like in the past. If you ever liked Chaplin, you will probably like A Countess from Hong Kong. It is the quintessence of everything Chaplin has ever felt.”
- Tim Hunter writing in The Harvard Crimson for 25 April 1967 gave it a fairly good review, stating: "Take the new Chaplin film on its own terms; contrary to all those patronizing critics, the old man hasn't really lost his touch, and Countess is a glorious romance".
- Pauline Kael for The New Yorker mentions that Brando was "his worst" in this film.

=== 1990s ===
- Leonard Maltin's Movie and Video Guide 1995 gave it one-and-a-half stars, stating it was "badly shot, badly timed, badly scored".

=== 21st century ===
- Chaplin biographer Jeffrey Vance, writing in 2003, maintains: "A Countess from Hong Kong is less interesting than any of Chaplin's previous sound films because it contains neither political nor satirical elements" (although there is a scene where an old lady renounces a stuffed animal's "red" tongue). Vance believes some of Chaplin's own comic vision and optimism is infused in Sophia Loren's role. A dance-hall girl, Loren's character of Natascha—a prostitute—"perpetuates Chaplin's lifelong fascination with fallen women as heroines. In many ways, Natascha is the proxy for the Tramp in the film, searching for a better life, while always understanding that both happiness and beauty are fleeting. The Tramp's philosophy is expressed by Natascha's dialogue, 'Don't be sad. That's too easy. Be like me. At this moment, I'm very happy...That's all we can ask for—this moment.' This statement can be applied to the film as well: while it is easy to lament its many failures, particularly because it is Chaplin's last film, it is perhaps best to cherish its wonderful, fleeting comic moments."
- In 2005, the Radio Times gave the film two stars, stating that "it's all too staid and too stagey".
- In 2012, TV Guide gave the movie one star, with the comment "a dismal, uninviting comedy".
- In 2013, Christopher Null of Filmcritic.com gave it three stars, stating, however, "the repetitive story (with Loren repeatedly running to hide in Brando's bathroom when there's a knock on the door) gets tiresome".

== Home media ==
The film was released on VHS in 1996, as part of the Universal Cinema Classics series. In 2003 it was released on DVD in widescreen format, and later re-released as part of the DVD set Marlon Brando: The Franchise Collection. It is now on Blu-ray.
