= Etaoin shrdlu =

Common metal-type printing error

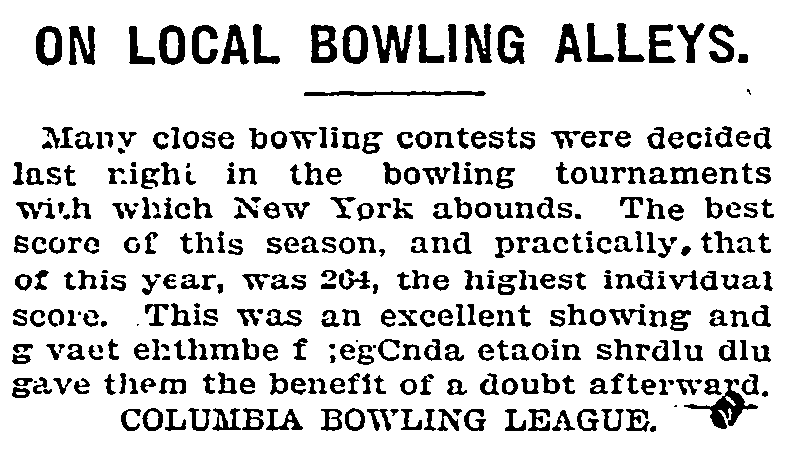
Etaoin shrdlu in a 1903 publication of The New York Times (third line from the bottom)

A humorous and intentional example of etaoin shrdlu in a 1916 publication of The Day Book

Etaoin shrdlu (/ˈɛti.ɔɪn ˈʃɜːrdluː/, /ˈeɪtɑːn ʃrədˈluː/) is a nonsense phrase that sometimes appeared by accident in print in the days of hot type publishing. It resulted from the custom of Linotype machine operators intentionally typing the words by sliding a finger over columns of keys to quickly finish a line containing a mistake before retyping to correct the error. This method was faster than manually manipulating an incomplete line to remove the error. The phrase, which was also supposed to be a warning to proofreaders, was inadvertently published often enough to become part of newspaper lore – a documentary about the last issue of The New York Times composed using hot metal (July 2, 1978) was titled Farewell, Etaoin Shrdlu. The phrase etaoin shrdlu is listed in the Oxford English Dictionary and in the Random House Webster's Unabridged Dictionary.

The letters in the string are, approximately, the twelve most commonly used letters in the English language, ordered by their frequency. Differing sources give slightly different versions, but one other well-known sequence is ETAOINS RHLDCUM.

== History and appearances in print ==
The letters on Linotype machines were arranged by descending letter frequency to speed up the mechanical operation of the machine, so lower-case e-t-a-o-i-n and s-h-r-d-l-u were the first two columns on the left side of the keyboard.

Each key would cause a brass matrix (an individual letter mold) from the corresponding slot in a font magazine to drop and be added to a line mold. After a line had been cast, the constituent matrices of its mold were returned to the font magazine.

If a mistake was made, the line could theoretically be corrected by hand in the assembler area. However, manipulating the matrices by hand within the partially assembled line was time-consuming and presented the chance of disturbing important adjustments. It was much quicker to fill out the bad line and discard the resulting line of text.

To make the line long enough to proceed through the machine, operators would finish it by running a finger down the first columns of the keyboard, which created a pattern that could be easily noticed by proofreaders. Occasionally such a line would be overlooked and make its way into print, most often in newspapers.

== Appearances outside typography ==
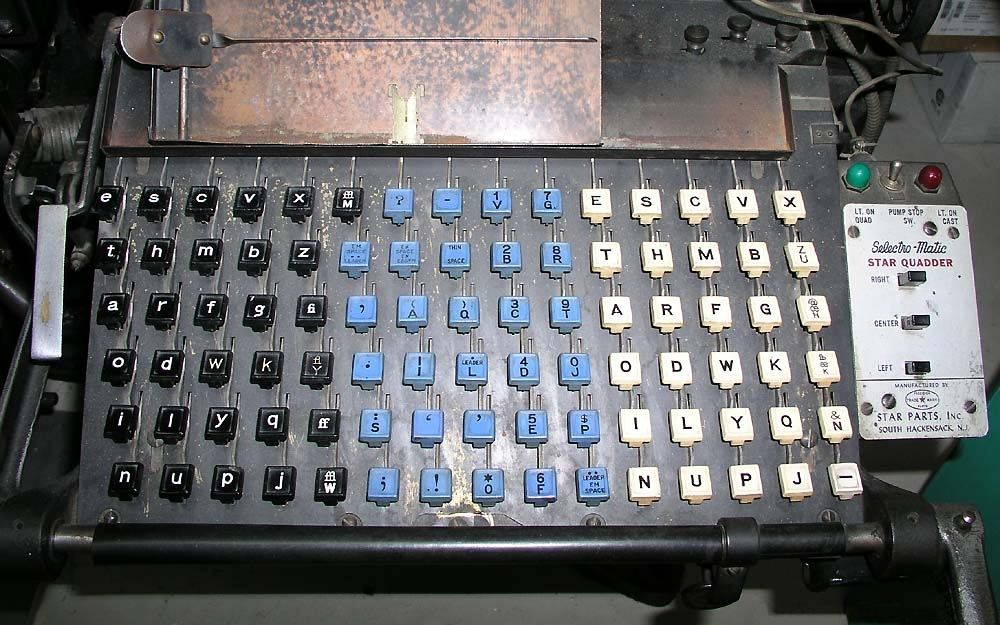
A Linotype machine keyboard. It has the following alphabet arrangement twice, once for lower case (the black keys) and once for upper case (the white keys), with the keys in the middle for numbers and symbols: etaoin / shrdlu / cmfwyp / vbgkqj / xz

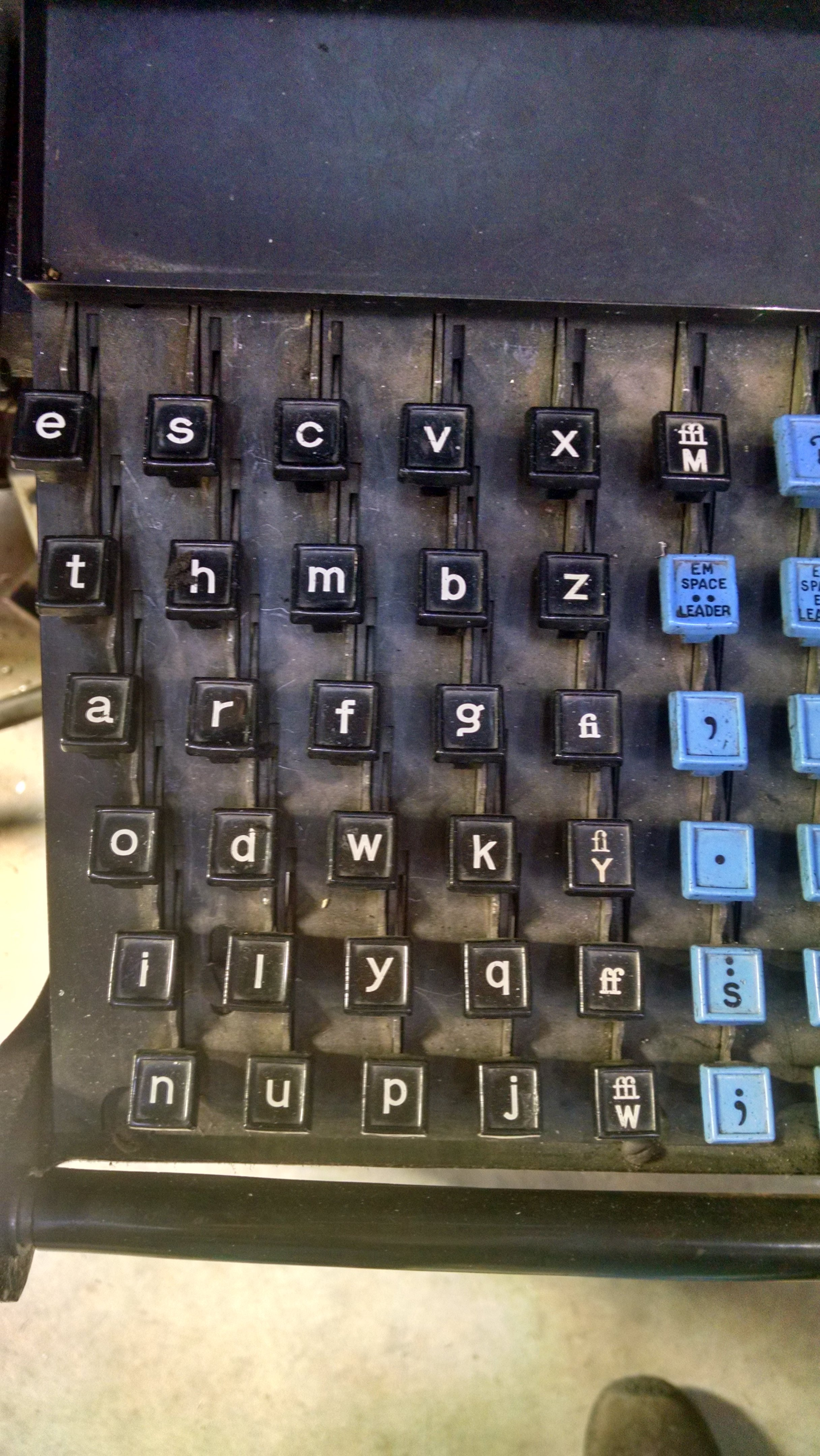
Close-up of keyboard, showing the etaoin / shrdlu pattern

The phrase has gained enough notability to appear outside typography, including:

=== Computing ===
- SHRDLU was used in 1972 by Terry Winograd as the name for an early artificial-intelligence system in Lisp.
- The ETAOIN SHRDLU Chess Program was written by Garth Courtois, Jr. for the Nova 1200 mini-computer, competing in the 6th and 7th ACM North American Computer Chess Championship 1975 and 1976.
- Etienne Shrdlu was used as the name of a character in Mavis Beacon Teaches Typing, touch-typing training software from the late 1980s.

=== Media ===
- Variations of etaoin shrdlu are used as character names in many works, including Elmer Rice's 1923 play The Adding Machine, Thomas Pynchon's early short story The Secret Integration (1962), Max Shulman's 1944 book Barefoot Boy with Cheek, Charles G. Finney's 1935 The Circus of Dr. Lao, and The Black Hole Travel Agency novels by Jack McKinney.
- Variations of etaoin shrdlu are used in the titles of some works, including "Etaoin Shrdlu", a 1942 short story by Fredric Brown about a sentient Linotype machine (a sequel, "Son of Etaoin Shrdlu", was written by others in 1981); the 1945 whimsical short story "Etaoin and Shrdlu" by Anthony Armstrong which ends "And Sir Etaoin and Shrdlu married and lived so happily ever after that whenever you come across Etaoin's name even today it's generally followed by Shrdlu's"; a 50-year history of the National Press Club (USA) published in 1958 titled Shrdlu – An Affectionate Chronicle; and The Best of Shrdlu, a collection by Denys Parsons of humorous misprints and double meanings from newspapers that Parsons ascribed to a mischievous character named Gobfrey Shrdlu, referring to collectors of them as Shrdlologists.
- Three pieces in The New Yorker magazine were published in 1925 under the pen name Etain Shrdlu. At least one piece in The New Yorker magazine had Etaoin Shrdlu in the title.
- Douglas R. Hofstadter's Gödel, Escher, Bach: An Eternal Golden Braid includes a chapter titled "SHRDLU, Toy of Man's Designing", which features a character named Eta Oin using a computer program SHRDLU – a reference to Terry Winograd's program and Bach's "Jesu, Joy of Man's Desiring".
- Etaoin Shrdlu is the name of a character in at least two Robert Crumb comic stories, including Weirdo.
- "Eotain" and "Shurdlu", using these spellings, are the names of two characters who make sporadic joint appearances in Phil Foglio's webcomic Girl Genius.
- Etaoin and Shrdlu both appear frequently in the drawings of Emile Mercier as place names, racehorses' names, and people's names.
- The French equivalent, Elaoin Sdrétu, appears in André Franquins "Noël et l'Elaoin" (1978).
- The rogue-like video game NetHack uses randomized names for unidentified magic scrolls; one of these names is ETAOIN SHRDLU.
- "Molten Fairies: Sprites of a Newspaper", featuring Etaoin, Shrdlu, and Cmfwyp, appeared in Perth's "The Daily News" in 1922.
- James Schmitz uses the sequence as a swear word in several of his pieces.

=== Music ===
- Shrdlu (Norman Shrdlu) is listed as the composer of "Jam Blues", cut 1 on the 1951 Norman Granz–produced jazz album released in 1990 as Charlie Parker Jam Session. This appears to be a joke on Granz's part as Norman Shrdlu is credited in several Parker (and other) tunes that are jam sessions rather than compositions.
- "Etaoin Shrdlu" is the title of the first song on Cul de Sac's 1999 album Crashes to Light, Minutes to Its Fall.
- "Etaoin" and "Shrdlu", written and performed by Dallas Roberts, are original musical pieces created for the soundtrack of the U.S. television series House of Cards, Season 2, Episode 10.

== See also ==
- Filler text
- Dord, a ghost word that appeared in the second edition of the Merriam-Webster New International Dictionary
- Lorem ipsum
- Qwerty
- Dvorak keyboard layout
- Azertyuiop (horse), whose name derives from letters on the top row of French keyboard layout
