= My American Wife (1922 film) =

1922 film

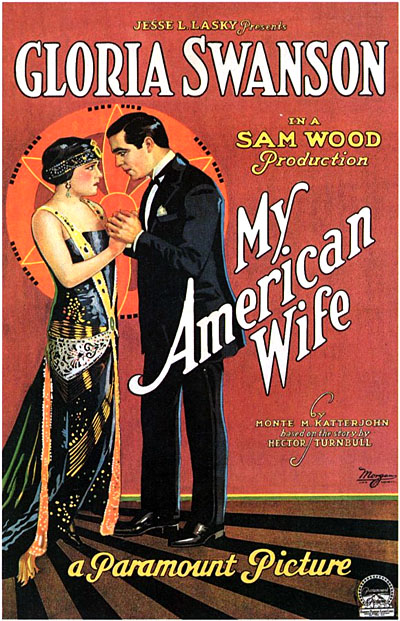
- Film poster
- Directed by: Sam Wood
- Written by: Monte M. Katterjohn
- Story by: Hector Turnbull
- Starring: Gloria Swanson; Antonio Moreno
- Production company: Famous Players–Lasky
- Distributed by: Paramount Pictures
- Release date: December 31, 1922 (United States)
- Running time: 6 reels
- Country: United States
- Language: Silent (English intertitles)

My American Wife is a 1922 American silent drama film directed by Sam Wood and starring Gloria Swanson. The film was produced by Famous Players–Lasky and distributed by Paramount Pictures. It is not known whether the film currently survives, which suggests that it is a lost film.

== Plot ==
As described in a film magazine, Manuel La Tessa, son of a wealthy South American family, meets Natalie Chester, a young Kentucky woman whose horse has won the race at a South American track. Manuel gives a party in her honor where she is insulted by one of the guest, and Manuel knocks down the offender. The offender, whose father is a powerful figure in the country's politics, challenges Manuel to a duel but also hires a man to hide in ambush and kill his opponent. Manuel is only wounded and Natalie nurses him back to health. His mother Donna Isabella La Tassa disapproves of the young American woman and asks her to leave. Natalie loves Manuel and seeks to uncover the mystery of the bullet fired at him during the duel. She finally locates the attempted assassin and with numerous bribes gets him to appear against the man who hired him to do it. This ruins the chance of the man from being elected a senator, and Manuel takes his seat. He tells all that he shall strive to do his best with the help of his American wife.

== Cast ==
- Gloria Swanson as Natalie Chester
- Antonio Moreno as Manuel La Tessa
- Josef Swickard as Don Fernando DeContas
- Eric Mayne as Carlos DeGrossa
- Gino Corrado as Pedro DeGrossa
- Edythe Chapman as Donna Isabella La Tassa
- Aileen Pringle as Hortensia deVereta
- Walter Long as Gomez
- Frank Butler as Horace Beresford
- Jacques D'Auray as Gaston Navarre
- Loyal Underwood as Danny O'Hare
- Ellen Drew as Party Guest
- Mary Land as Maid
- Mervyn LeRoy (uncredited extra)
