= The Idle Class =

1921 film by Charlie Chaplin

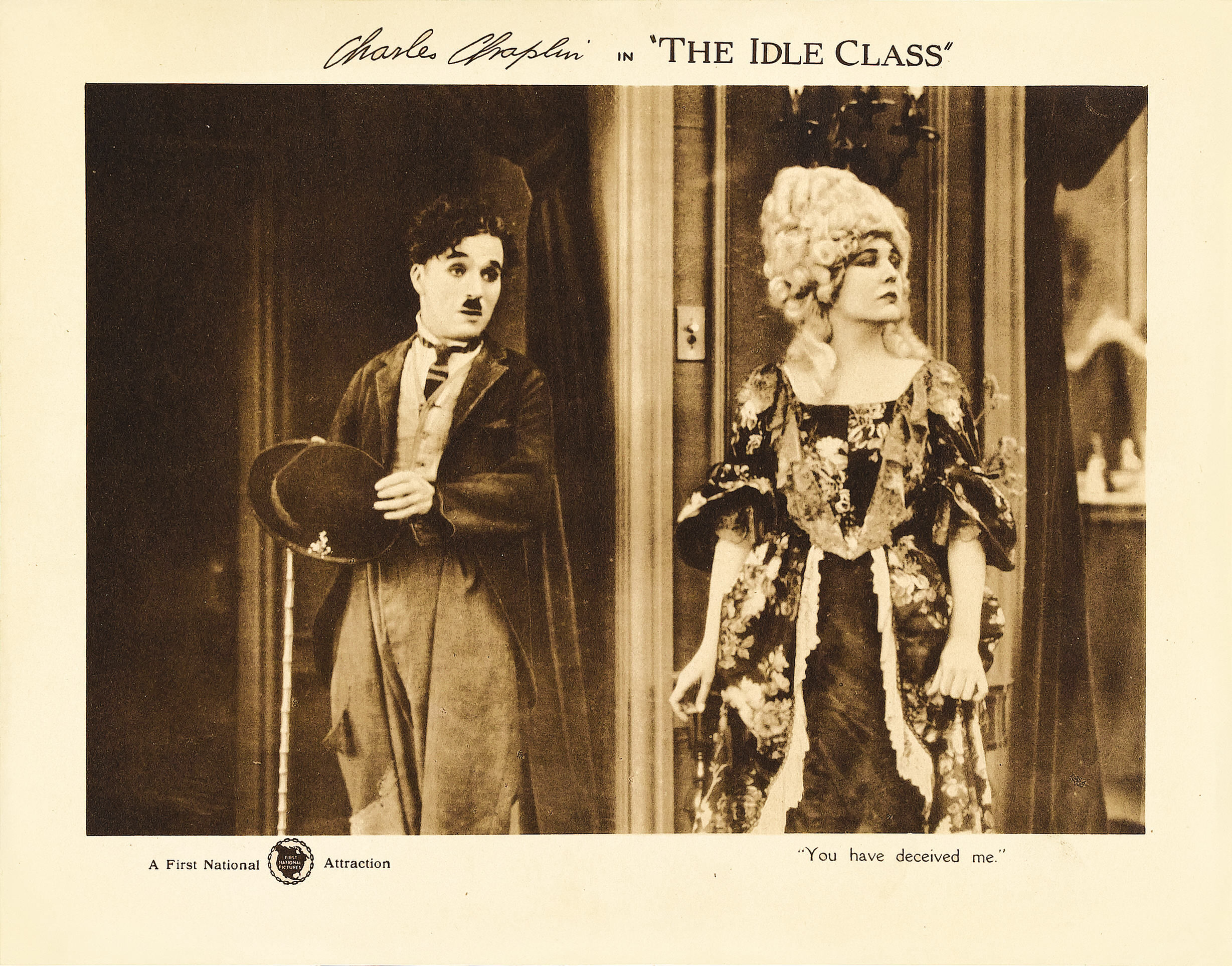
- Lobby card
- Directed by: Charlie Chaplin
- Written by: Charlie Chaplin
- Produced by: Charlie Chaplin
- Starring: Charlie Chaplin; Edna Purviance; Henry Bergman; Mack Swain
- Cinematography: Roland Totheroh
- Edited by: Charlie Chaplin
- Music by: Johnnie von Haines (1969) Charlie Chaplin (1972)
- Production company: Charles Chaplin Productions
- Distributed by: First National
- Release date: September 25, 1921
- Running time: 32 minutes
- Country: United States
- Language: Silent (English intertitles)

The Idle Class

The Idle Class is a 1921 American silent comedy short film written and directed by Charlie Chaplin for First National Pictures.

== Plot ==
The "Little Tramp" heads to a resort for warm weather and golf. At the golf course, the Tramp's theft of balls in play causes one golfer to mistakenly attack another. Meanwhile, a neglected wife leaves her wealthy husband until he gives up drinking. When the Tramp is later mistaken for a pickpocket, he crashes a masquerade ball to escape from a policeman. There, he is mistaken for the woman's husband. Eventually, it is all straightened out, and the Tramp is once more on his way.

== Cast ==
- Charlie Chaplin as Tramp / Husband
- Edna Purviance as Edna, Neglected Wife

== Uncredited Cast: ==
- Charles Aber as [?]
- Joe Anderson as [?]
- Laura Anson as [?]
- Walter Bacon as [?]
- Robert Badger as [?]
- George Bastian as [?]
- Gladys Baxter as [?]
- J.A. Beaver as [?]
- Harriett Bennett as [?]
- Mary Ann Bennett as [?]
- Henry Bergman as Sleeping Hobo / Guest in Cop Uniform
- Richard Brewster as [?]
- Carl Brown as [?]
- Mack Swain as Edna's Father
- Al Ernest Garcia as Cop in Park / Guest
- Rex Storey as Pickpocket / Guest
- John Rand as Golfer / Guest
- Lita Grey as Maid

== Reception ==
Helen Rockwell of the New York Telegraph wrote,

"...instead of going for a five-reel affair, he has returned to his first short love. But what there is of The Idle Class is so good and so funny that one realizes how much better is it to be entertained by two reels than bored in five."

Chaplin biographer Jeffrey Vance describes The Idle Class as “one of Chaplin’s funniest short comedies.” He notes that Chaplin began production on the film in January 1921 with the working title Vanity Fair:

“Ultimately, Chaplin favored a more equivocal title—The Idle Class—for it is purposely not clear in the film which is the idle class: the idle rich or the idle poor. Chaplin plays both. The film took five months to complete, an amazingly long time for a two-reel comedy.” Vance speculates, “It is perhaps ironic that the story of The Idle Class centers on an unhappy marriage between an absent-minded husband and a lonely wife. This state of affairs could easily describe the principal characters of the tragi-comedy that was Chaplin’s own marriage. In the film Chaplin manages to dramatize the two sides of his own personality: Charlie the Tramp and the Absent-minded husband, rich and neglectful, absorbed to his own interests and indifferent to others. The latter was certainly how Mildred Harris [his first wife] regarded Chaplin.”
