= Tom Murray (actor) =

American actor and musician

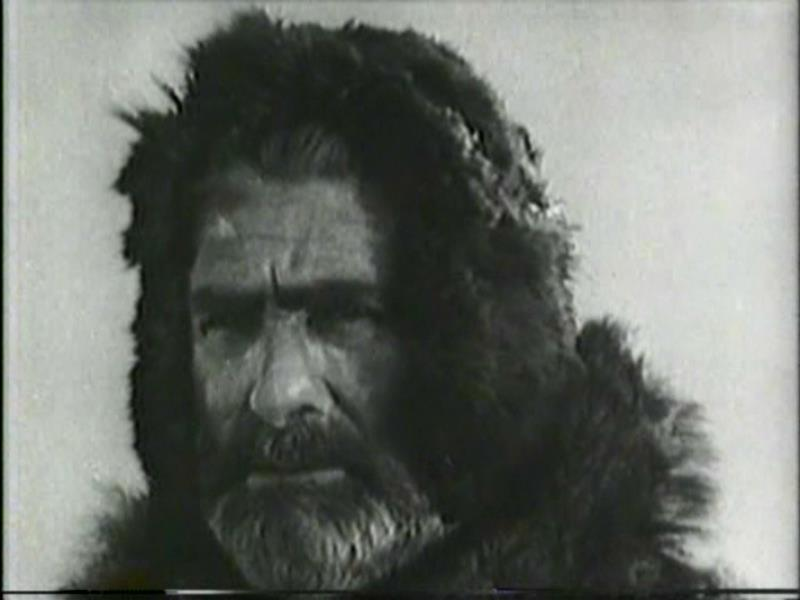
- Murray in The Gold Rush, 1925
- Born: September 8, 1874; Stonefort, Illinois, United States
- Died: August 27, 1935 (aged 60); Hollywood, California, United States
- Occupation: Actor
- Years active: 1916–1931

Thomas Henderson Murray (September 8, 1874 – August 27, 1935) was an American film actor and musician. He appeared in thirteen films between 1922 and 1931, including roles in two Charlie Chaplin films and was a member of Hillbilly country music groups in the early 30s. Born in Stonefort, Illinois and died in Hollywood, California of stomach cancer.

== Filmography ==
| Year | Title | Role | Notes |
|---|---|---|---|
| 1916 | Tweedledum Torpedoed by Cupid | | Short, Alternative title: Torpedoed by Cupid |
| 1916 | A Lucky Tramp | | Short |
| 1916 | Lend Me Your Wife | | Short |
| 1916 | A Bath Tub Elopement | | Short |
| 1922 | French Heels | Camp Foreman | |
| 1922 | Too Much Business | Officer 16 | |
| 1922 | The Ladder Jinx | Detective Smith | |
| 1922 | Don't Be Foolish | Cop | Short |
| 1923 | The Pilgrim | Sheriff Bryan | |
| 1923 | The Meanest Man in the World | Andy Oatman | |
| 1924 | Ride 'Em Cowboy | Pistol Pete | Short |
| 1925 | The Gold Rush | Black Larsen | |
| 1925 | The Business of Love | Sweeney | |
| 1926 | Tramp, Tramp, Tramp | Nick Kargas | |
| 1926 | Into Her Kingdom | Bolshevik Guard | |
| 1926 | Private Izzy Murphy | The Attorney | |
| 1931 | White Renegade | Jane's Father | Alternative title: Fool's Gold, (final film role) |

== Music career ==
He was part of 2 hillbilly music groups, the Beverly Hill Billies and the Hollywood Hillbillies that was also known as Uncle Tom Murray's Hollywood Hillbillies. Roy Rogers and Shug Fisher were one-time members of the Hollywood Hillbillies.
