= The Adding Machine =

1923 play by Elmer Rice

The Adding Machine is a 1923 play by Elmer Rice.

The 2007 Columbia Encyclopedia of Modern Drama called it "a landmark of American Expressionism, reflecting the growing interest in this highly subjective and nonrealistic form of modern drama."

== Plot ==
Mr. Zero lives in an unnamed major city where he has worked for 25 years in an accounting office adding figures together by hand. His coworker, Miss Devore, dreams of having the courage to kill herself and detests Zero. His wife, Mrs. Zero, spends her days gossiping, going to see lowbrow movies, and nagging Mr. Zero for being a disappointing husband. One day, after work, Zero's boss unceremoniously fires Zero and informs him he will be replaced by a mechanical adding machine. Zero murders his boss on the spot and then returns home in time for his wife's dinner party. The guests' inane chatter is interrupted by a cop who arrives to arrest Zero.

At his trial, Zero tries to justify his actions and explain his frustrations but the jury declares him guilty. Before his execution, Zero is kept in a zoo-like exhibit where tour groups view him and buy souvenirs. Mrs. Zero visits him but leaves after their conversation enrages her. Zero is then visited by a winged, otherworldly "Fixer" who taunts Zero before having two henchmen drag Zero to his execution.

Zero, dead, awakens in a cemetery where he befriends a man named Shrdlu. Shrdlu considers himself innately evil and recounts his religious upbringing with his mother, whom he eventually murdered. After another corpse screams at Shrdlu and Zero to be quiet, they relocate to the Elysian Fields, where Zero encounters the soul of Miss Devore, who has killed herself. Zero and Miss Devore begin a romance and try to be happy together in the afterlife. Shrdlu, however, is distraught and confused at the lack of divine punishment in the afterlife.

Zero, finding his existence aimless, begins obsessively operating an enormous adding machine. Eventually, Lieutenant Charles, the boss of the Elysian Fields, comes to tell Zero that he is a waste of space and his soul is scheduled to be recycled and reborn on Earth. Zero resists, but Charles lures him away using an attractive woman named Hope, leaving Charles to grumble about his own unpleasant job.

== Success ==
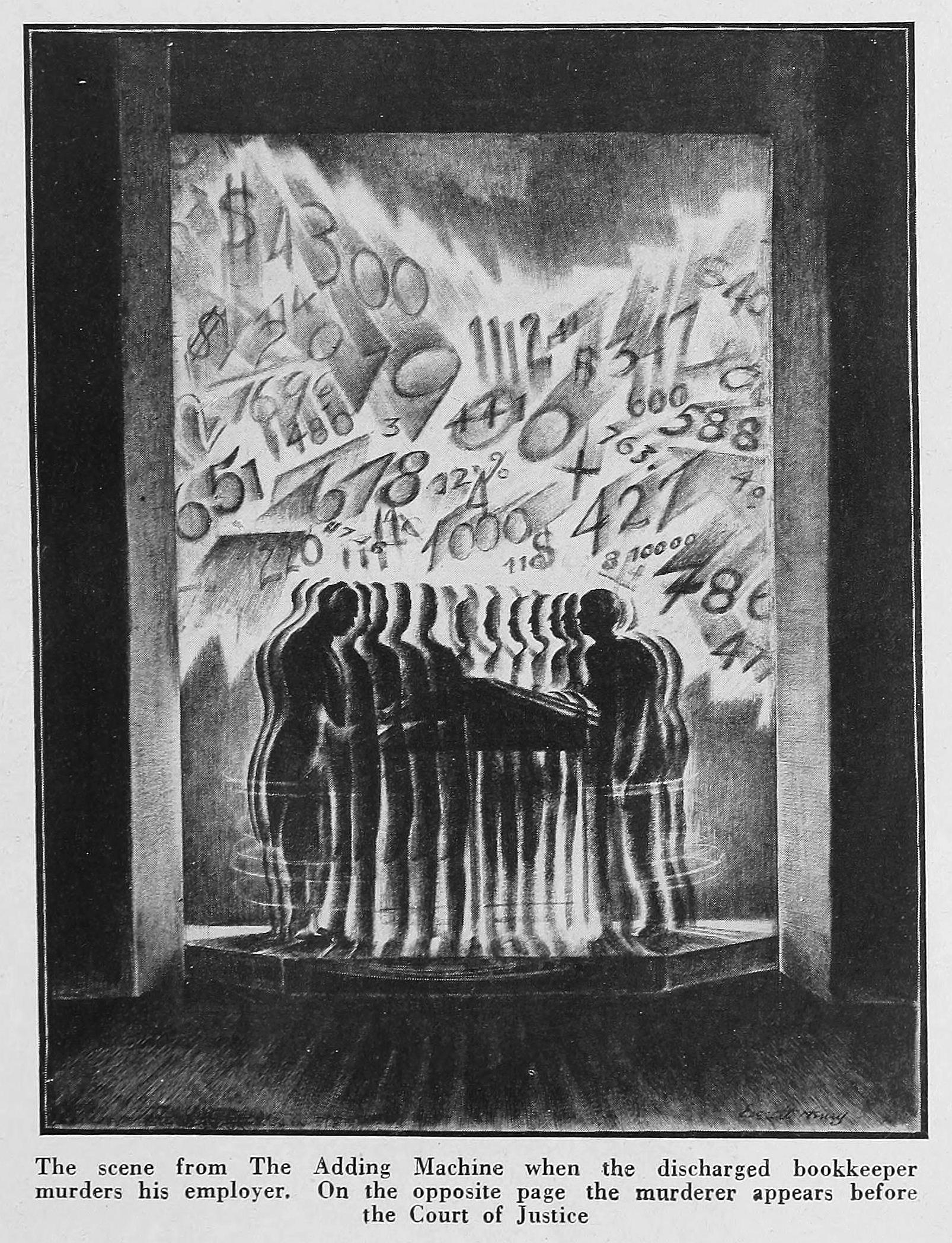
Scene from the play in the periodical, Shadowland

The play premiered at the Garrick Theatre on March 19, 1923. Though the play has been critically regarded as a classic, it ran for just two months on Broadway for 72 performances. It was revived at the Phoenix Theatre in New York in 1956.

The play was an influence on the Tennessee Williams play Stairs to the Roof. Years later, it was adapted into a 1969 film of the same name, written and directed by Jerome Epstein and starring Milo O'Shea, Phyllis Diller, Billie Whitelaw and Sydney Chaplin.

In 1989, Chicago's Hystopolis Productions adapted Rice's play for puppets; the production was hailed for its visual design. In September 1992, this production went on to be featured at the First International Festival of Puppet Theater presented at The Public Theater in New York which was a co-production of Joseph Papp and the Jim Henson Foundation. The Adding Machine remains part of Hystopolis' professional repertoire.

== Musical adaptation ==
In 2007, the play was adapted into a musical entitled Adding Machine with a score by Joshua Schmidt and a book by Jason Loewith and Schmidt. The musical debuted in Illinois at the Next Theatre Company in 2007. It then opened Off-Broadway at the Minetta Lane Theatre on February 25, 2008, after previews that started on February 8. In September 2016 the musical was produced at the Finborough Theatre in London England.
