= Limelight (1952 film) =

1952 film by Charlie Chaplin

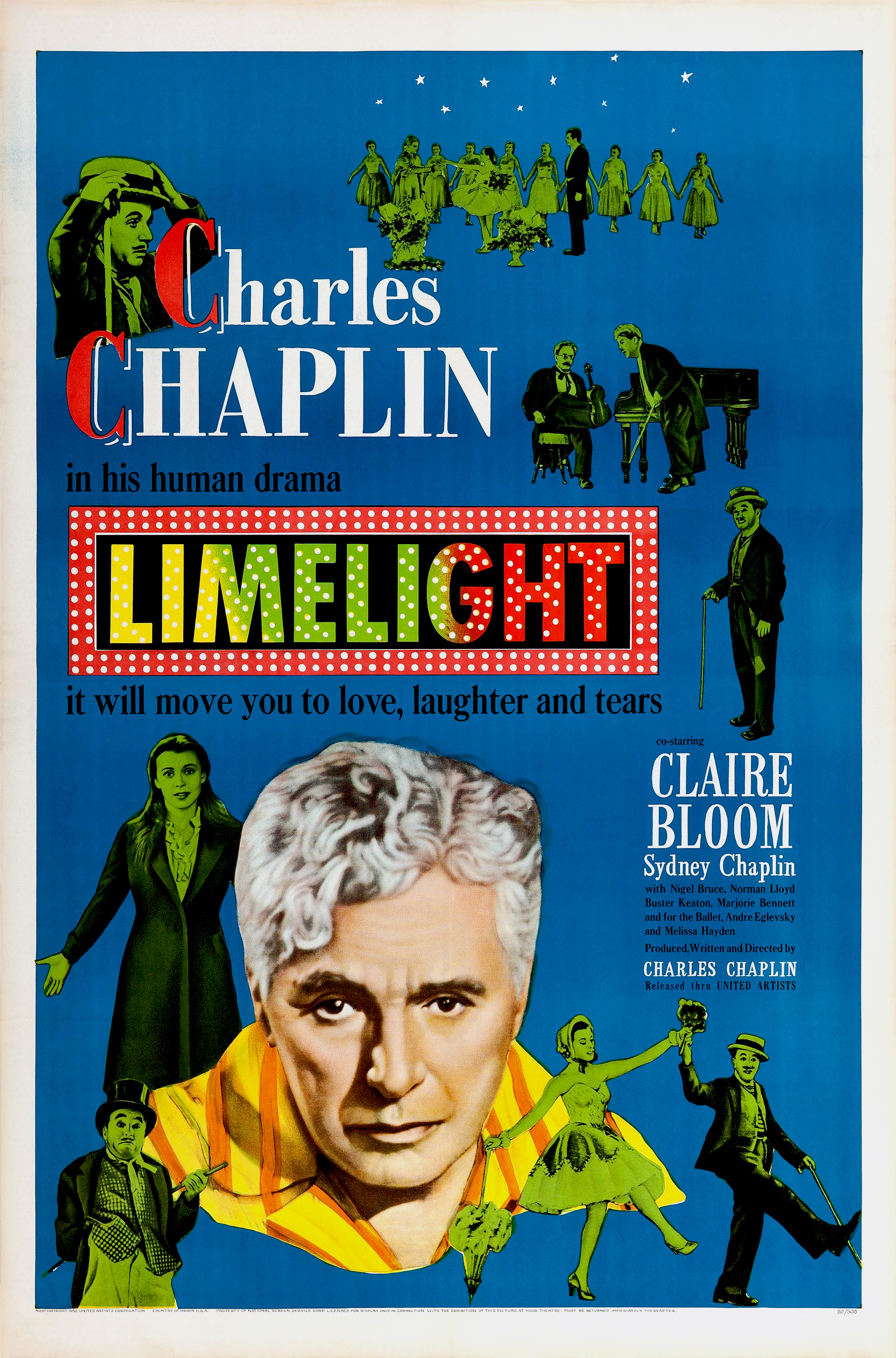
- Original theatrical release poster
- Directed by: Charlie Chaplin
- Screenplay by: Charlie Chaplin
- Story by: Charlie Chaplin
- Based on: Footlights by Charlie Chaplin
- Produced by: Charlie Chaplin
- Starring: Charlie Chaplin; Claire Bloom; Sydney Chaplin; Nigel Bruce; Norman Lloyd; Buster Keaton; Marjorie Bennett; André Eglevsky; Melissa Hayden
- Cinematography: Karl Struss
- Edited by: Joe Inge
- Music by: Charlie Chaplin
- Production company: Celebrated Productions
- Distributed by: United Artists (1952 release); Columbia Pictures (1972 release)
- Release date: October 23, 1952 (United States)
- Running time: 137 minutes
- Country: United States
- Language: English
- Budget: $900,000
- Box office: $8 million

Limelight is a 1952 American comedy-drama film written, produced, directed by, and starring Charlie Chaplin, based on a novella by Chaplin titled Footlights. The score was composed by Chaplin and arranged by Ray Rasch.

The film stars Chaplin as a washed-up comedian who saves a suicidal dancer, played by Claire Bloom, from killing herself, and both try to get through life. Additional roles are provided by Nigel Bruce, Sydney Earl Chaplin, Wheeler Dryden, and Norman Lloyd, with an appearance by Buster Keaton. In dance scenes, Bloom is doubled by Melissa Hayden.

Upon the film's release, critics' reception was divided; it was heavily boycotted in the United States because of Chaplin's alleged communist sympathies, and failed commercially. However, the film was re-released in the United States in 1972, which included its first screening in Los Angeles. This allowed the two-decade-old film to be in contention for the 45th Academy Awards where Chaplin won his only competitive Oscar. Today, the film is sometimes regarded as one of Chaplin's best and most personal works, and has attained a cult following.

== Plot ==
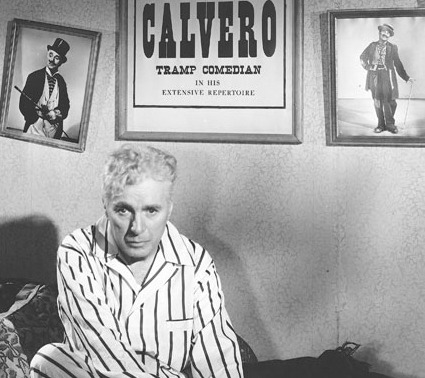
Limelight (1952) was a serious and autobiographical film for Chaplin. His character, Calvero, is an ex–music hall star (described in this image as a "Tramp Comedian") forced to deal with his loss of popularity.

In London in 1914, on the eve of World War I, Calvero, once a famous stage clown, but now a washed-up drunk, saves a young dancer, Thereza "Terry" Ambrose, from a suicide attempt. Nursing her back to health, Calvero helps Terry regain her self-esteem and resume her dancing career. In doing so, he regains his own self-confidence, but an attempt to make a comeback is met with failure. Terry says she wants to marry Calvero despite their age difference; however, she has befriended Neville, a young composer who Calvero believes would be better suited to her. In order to give them a chance, Calvero leaves home and becomes a street entertainer. Terry, now starring in her own show, eventually finds Calvero and persuades him to return to the stage for a benefit concert. Reunited with an old partner, Calvero gives an ambiguously triumphant comeback performance. At its end, he suffers a heart attack onstage and is placed on a cot. Anticipating his imminent death, Calvero asks to see Terry, who is the next act, dance. Carried to the wings, he appears not to open his eyes, and then dies as she dances.

== Cast ==
- Charlie Chaplin as Calvero
- Claire Bloom as Thereza "Terry" Embrose
- Nigel Bruce as Postant
- Buster Keaton as Calvero's partner
- Sydney Earl Chaplin as Ernest Neville
- Norman Lloyd as Bodalink
- André Eglevsky as Male Ballet Dancer
- Marjorie Bennett as Mrs. Alsop
- Wheeler Dryden as Thereza's doctor and Old Ballet Dancer
- Melissa Hayden as Terry's dance double
- Barry Bernard as John Redfern
- Stapleton Kent as Claudius (scene cut for worldwide release)
- Mollie Glessing as Maid
- Leonard Mudie as Calvero's Doctor
- Snub Pollard as Street Musician
- Geraldine Chaplin as Little Girl in opening scene (uncredited)
- Josephine Chaplin as Child in opening scene (uncredited)
- Michael Chaplin as Child in opening scene (uncredited)
- Charles Chaplin III as Clown (uncredited)
- Cyril Delevanti as Griffin — a Clown (uncredited)
- Oona O'Neill as Extra (Thereza's double in one episode, uncredited)
- Eric Wilton as Major Domo at Dinner (uncredited)

== Production ==
“In his youth he yearned to be a musician but he could not afford any kind of instrument on which to learn. Another longing was to be a romantic actor, but he was too small and his diction too uncultured. Nevertheless, he emotionally believed himself to be the greatest actor living. Necessity made him turn to comedy, which he loathed, because it demanded of him an intimacy with his audience, which he did not feel and which never came natural to him.” - From “Calvero’s Story” - a portion of the novel Chaplin wrote in preparation for Limelight.

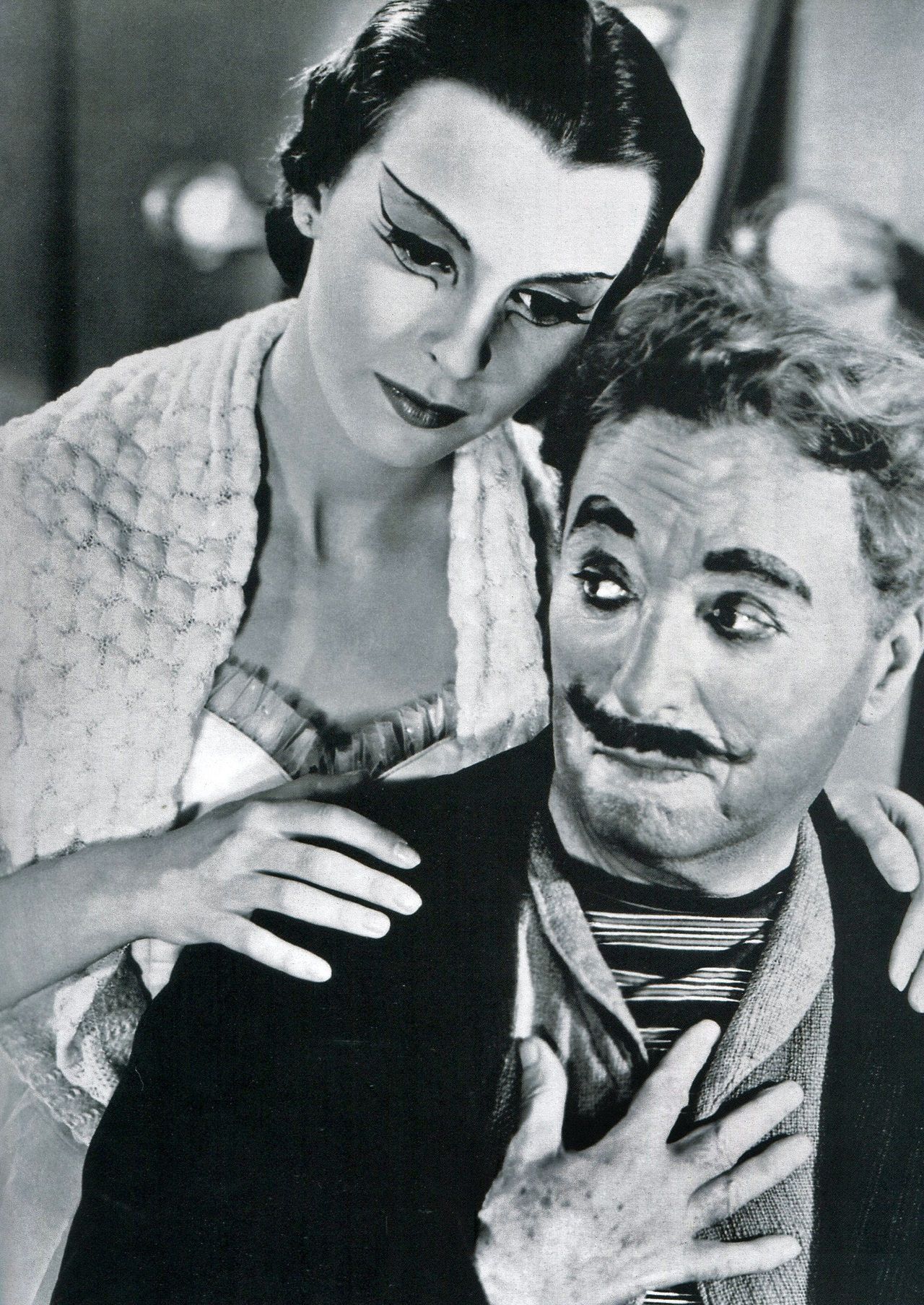
Charlie Chaplin and Claire Bloom in Limelight

Although the film is set in London, it was entirely filmed in the Hollywood area, mostly at the Chaplin Studios. The street where Calvero lives was a redressed set at Paramount Studios, the music hall scenes were filmed at RKO-Pathé studios, and some exterior scenes use back-projected footage of London. Filming took 55 days. Chaplin prominently featured members of his family in the film, including five of his children and his half-brother Wheeler Dryden. Chaplin chose stage actress Claire Bloom for the role of Terry, her first major film role. Chaplin told his older sons he expected Limelight to be his last film. By all accounts, he was very happy and energized during production, a fact often attributed to the joy of recreating his early career in the music hall. Chaplin biographers have assumed that his character in the film was based on his father, Charles Chaplin Sr., who had also lost his audience and became an alcoholic, which led to his death in 1901. In both his 1964 autobiography and his 1974 book, My Life in Pictures, however, Chaplin insists that Calvero is based on the life of stage actor Frank Tinney. Limelight was made during a time when Chaplin was starting to lose his audience, too; in many ways, the movie was highly autobiographical.

=== Chaplin and Keaton collaboration ===
The pairing of Chaplin and Buster Keaton in the final musical number is historic for being the only time the two performed together on film. Chaplin, at first, had not written the part for Keaton, because he believed that the role was too small. It was not until he learned that Keaton was going through hard times that Chaplin insisted Keaton be cast in the film: Before Limelight, Keaton had gone through a disastrous marriage, lost most of his fortune in the divorce process, and had appeared infrequently in films in the preceding years.

Fueled by the intense rivalry among fans of the two comics, a rumor has persisted that Keaton gave such a superior performance that Chaplin jealously cut his scenes so he would not be upstaged by his rival. A close associate of Chaplin claimed that Chaplin did not feel threatened by Keaton's performance, and even heavily edited his own footage of the duet while enhancing Keaton's. According to Keaton's biographer Rudi Blesh, Chaplin eased his notoriously rigid directorial style to give Keaton free rein to invent his own comic business during this sequence. Keaton's widow Eleanor said that he was thrilled with his appearance in the film, and believed that his business partner, Raymond Rohauer, started and fueled the rumors. Chaplin's son, Sydney, who also appeared in the film, said that even if some of Keaton's best scenes were cut, which he did not believe, the storyline would not logically allow a supporting actor to suddenly appear and upstage the climactic comeback of Chaplin's character.

While filming was underway, Chaplin's friend and former publicist Harry Crocker invited a large number of reporters to the set to watch the actors work.

Limelight was one the first collaborations between Chaplin and Jerome Epstein, who would share a 30-year professional relationship and friendship. A movie executive counselled Epstein not to take a credit on Limelight, because it was made during the period in which Chaplin had become a target of McCarthyism.

== Release ==
The film opened October 23, 1952 at the Astor Theatre and at the Trans-Lux 60th Street theatre in New York City and was shown for three months to good business.

Contemporary reviews found much to admire in the film, but commonly faulted it as excessively long and verbose. Bosley Crowther of The New York Times called it "a brilliant weaving of comic and tragic strands, eloquent, tearful and beguiling with supreme virtuosity," though he conceded, "One tangible weakness of the film is the garrulous discussion of human foibles and paradoxes that Mr. Chaplin permits himself." Gene Arneel of Variety wrote, "As the focal character on the screen, Chaplin is, at times, magnificent. He has departed from the baggy-pants but still manages to work in some sock pantomime stuff. However, the role he gave himself calls for too much talk, and some of this grows tedious." Harrison's Reports called it "an excellent human drama ... Chaplin does an outstanding job in every department, thus proving his genius. The one criticism that may be made is its excessive length; in some of the scenes Chaplin indulges in too much talk, preaching and moralizing in what impresses one as an attempt to get over his personal philosophy on life in general." Richard L. Coe of The Washington Post declared, "Mr. Chaplin's gentle picture, over-long and under-disciplined it may be, restates the timeless lesson of human companionship that is the theme of philosophers and preachers. For all its shortcomings, 'Limelight' is a creative, distinguished film." John McCarten of The New Yorker wrote, "Regrettably, Mr. Chaplin isn't as quick as Shakespeare in getting the point across. There are, however, rewarding flashes of the sort of comedy and pathos that distinguished Mr. Chaplin's work in the past, and his portrait of an eminent performer who has fallen out of public favor carries a sad conviction." The Monthly Film Bulletin of Britain wrote that the film "is not perfect; it is perhaps ten minutes too long; there are moments when sentiment slips over into sentimentality. The weaknesses are slight and insignificant. The qualities of Limelight — the affection, the humour, the almost overpowering sadness in the portrayal of Calvero — are unerringly those of the screen's greatest humanist."

The film inspired protests, in particular from the American Legion. Based on their protests, Charles Skouras, president of National Theatres and its subsidiary Fox West Coast Theatres blocked its release in Los Angeles.

While heading to Britain to promote the film, Chaplin learned that he had been refused a re-entry visa to the United States because of his alleged communist sympathies and the criticized nature of his recent personal life, and many American theaters refused to play Limelight. Outside of cinemas in several East Coast cities, the film was not seen by the American moviegoing public. It was not until 1972 that the film was finally seen in wide American release. Limelight currently holds an 88% on Rotten Tomatoes from 40 reviews with the consensus summarizing: "A late triumph for one of early cinema's top talents, Limelight highlights the melancholy heart of Chaplin's comedic gifts." The film was massively popular in Japan. It was enormously successful in Europe and around the world. However, in the U.S. it was a relative disappointment, only taking in $1 million.

Limelight enjoyed a cumulative worldwide gross of $8 million. Chaplin biographer Jeffrey Vance notes that the film's reputation has slowly grown over the decades. Vance maintains "Limelight is Chaplin's last great film, and it plays like a self-conscious summing up of his life and career. As a journey back to his beginnings and an often rapier-sharp self-critique, Limelight is Chaplin's most deeply personal and introspective film."

== Music ==
Sheet music cover of "The Terry Theme", by Charlie Chaplin, and published by Bourne, Inc.

External audio
- You may hear Chaplin's "Terry's Theme" arranged by John Serry as performed in 1956; Here on Archive.org

The instrumental theme to the film, composed by Chaplin and titled "The Terry Theme", was arranged for 40-piece orchestra with a large string section by Leon Young for Frank Chacksfield and issued by Decca Records in 1953. This disc won Chacksfield a gold disc in the United States, and in the United Kingdom, where it reached No. 2 in the UK Singles Chart, and won him the NME award as 'Record of the Year'. It spent eight weeks at No. 2 (an all-time UK chart record), and in all thirteen weeks in the top five chart positions With added lyrics by Geoff Parsons and John Turner, the theme was turned into a popular and often-covered song as "Eternally".

In 1973, over 20 years after the film's first release, Chaplin and his musical collaborators Raymond Rasch and Larry Russell were awarded an Oscar for Best Original Dramatic Score. In the case of Larry Russell, JazzWax journalist Marc Myers has written that this was a case of mistaken identity and Russell Garcia was the actual composer who should have been awarded the 1972 Oscar. Larry Russell's family denies the report. Regardless, it was the only competitive Academy Award that Chaplin ever received (he had previously received two Honorary Oscars).

== Home media ==
In 2000, Limelight was released in the United States on DVD from Image Entertainment. In 2003, it was released on a special edition two-disc DVD set from Warner Home Video, which also later went out of print. The Criterion Collection released the film on both Blu-ray and DVD in the United States on May 19, 2015. A four-minute scene, featuring Stapleton Kent as an armless violin player, had been cut for the film's worldwide release, but was included in the set as a bonus feature. This scene was also included as an extra on the Image DVD release. The only home video release that contains the full-length uncut American theatrical premiere version with the deleted scene intact is the 1993 laserdisc release on the CBS/Fox Video label, which was prepared by film restorationist David Shepard.

== Legacy ==
The sixtieth anniversary of Limelight was celebrated by the Academy of Motion Picture Arts and Sciences with a reception, panel, and film screening at their Samuel Goldwyn Theater in Beverly Hills, California, on October 3, 2012. Cast members Claire Bloom and Norman Lloyd shared their recollections in a conversation moderated by Chaplin biographer and archivist Jeffrey Vance.

== Bibliography ==
- Eyman, Scott 2023. Charlie Chaplin vs. America: When Art, Sex and Politics Collided. Simon & Schuster, New York. ISBN 9781982176358.
- The Criterion Collection staff (2015). Limelight (booklet). Gris, Henry (article: Hollywood Chaplin). New York: The Criterion Collection. ISBN 9781604659948.
