= Sydney Chaplin (American actor) =

American actor (1926– 2009)

- Born: Sydney Earl Chaplin; March 30, 1926; Beverly Hills, California, U.S.
- Died: March 3, 2009 (aged 82); Rancho Mirage, California, U.S.
- Occupation: Actor
- Years active: 1952–1977
- Spouses: Noëlle Adam (m. 1960; div. 1985) Margaret Beebe (m. 1998)
- Children: 1
- Parent(s): Charlie Chaplin; Lita Grey
- Relatives: Chaplin family

Sydney Earl Chaplin (March 30, 1926 – March 3, 2009) was an American actor. He was the second son of Charlie Chaplin and Lita Grey. One of his major roles was in his father's film Limelight (1952). In theater, Chaplin won the Tony Award for Best Featured Actor in a Musical for his 1957 performance in Bells Are Ringing.

== Early years ==
Sydney Earl Chaplin was born on March 30, 1926, in Beverly Hills, California. Chaplin was the second son of Charlie Chaplin and Lita Grey. His parents had married in November 1924 when Lita became pregnant with Sydney's elder brother Charles. Sydney was born five weeks prematurely, 10 months after the birth of his older brother. He was named for his father's half-brother, Sydney Chaplin. His parents divorced a year after his birth. The boys later had eight half-siblings from their father's fourth marriage to Oona O'Neill.

His mother insisted on calling him "Tommy" due to her distaste for his namesake uncle. Sydney and his older brother were brought up mostly by their maternal grandmother, while his mother attempted to advance her career as a singer. The family spent most of one year in Nice, where the boys became fluent in French.

Chaplin was educated at the boarding schools Black-Foxe Military Institute and Lawrenceville School in New Jersey, as well as the public North Hollywood High School.

== Career ==
After serving in the United States Army during World War II in Europe, Chaplin returned to California, where he became involved in acting both on stage and in films. He gained early acting experience in The Circle Theater, now known as El Centro Theatre, including acting in three plays directed by his father.

He also appeared in several Broadway productions, including Bells Are Ringing opposite Judy Holliday in 1957, for which he won a Tony Award for Best Performance by a Featured Actor in a Musical. In 1959, he costarred with Lauren Bacall in George Axelrod's comedy Goodbye Charlie and headlined Jule Styne's 1961 musical Subways Are for Sleeping. He played in Funny Girl opposite Barbra Streisand in 1964, for which he was nominated for a Tony Award. Chaplin also had supporting roles in two of his father's films, Limelight (1952) and A Countess from Hong Kong (1967).

Chaplin retired from acting in the 1970s. In the 1980s, he owned and managed a restaurant, Chaplin's, in Palm Springs, California.

Following his retirement from acting, Chaplin seldom made public appearances. Exceptions included his attendance at Cinecon in Los Angeles in 1998, and at the Cineteca di Bologna 2002 festival (Il Cinema Ritrovato), which mounted a fiftieth-anniversary screening of Limelight. He appeared also at the San Francisco Silent Film Festival in 2004, where he spoke after screenings of his father's film The Circus to promote film historian Jeffrey Vance's Chaplin books.

== Personal life ==
In 1960 Chaplin married French dancer and actress Noëlle Adam, by whom he had one son, Stephan (b. 1960). In 1985 this marriage ended in divorce.

He became involved with Margaret Beebe in 1984. They married in 1998, and remained married until Chaplin's death.

== Book ==
Chaplin helped complete and publish his mother's 1998 autobiography, Wife of the Life of the Party. He also wrote the book's foreword, where he shared some of his own history and private thoughts on his parents.

== Death ==
At age 82, Chaplin died of a stroke on March 3, 2009, at his home in Rancho Mirage, California.

== Stage credits ==
Year	Title	Role	Venue	Notes
1946	Johnny Got His Gun	Joe Bonham	Circle Theatre	Stage adaptation by Dalton Trumbo; Directed by Charlie Chaplin
1948	The Adding Machine	Mr. Zero	Circle Theatre	Directed by Jerry Epstein
1950	Rain	Sergeant O'Hara	Circle Theatre	
1956	Bells Are Ringing	Jeff Moss	Shubert Theatre	Won Tony Award for Best Featured Actor in a Musical
1959	Goodbye Charlie	George Tracy	Lyceum Theatre	Co-starred with Lauren Bacall
1961	Subways Are for Sleeping	Tom Bailey	St. James Theatre	Nominated—Tony Award for Best Actor in a Musical
1964	Funny Girl	Nick Arnstein	Winter Garden Theatre	Nominated—Tony Award for Best Actor in a Musical
1966	Funny Girl	Nick Arnstein	Prince of Wales Theatre	West End debut; reprised role with Barbra Streisand
1968	The Goodbye People	Max Silverman	Ethel Barrymore Theatre	Original Broadway production
1970	Three by Two	Various roles	St. James Theatre	Directed by Arthur Storch

== Filmography ==
=== Film ===
Year	Title	Role	Notes
1952	Limelight	Neville	Directed by Charlie Chaplin
1954	Columbus entdeckt Krähwinkel	Jimmy Hunter	German production; released in US as Columbus Discovers America; aka Columbus entdeckt Krähwi
1955	Land of the Pharaohs	Treneh	Directed by Howard Hawks
1955	Confession	Mike Kessler	UK title: The Deadliest Sin
1955	Abdullah the Great	Ahmed	Also known as Abdullah's Harem
1956	Pillars of the Sky	Timothy	Starring Jeff Chandler
1957	Four Girls in Town	Johnny Troy	
1957	Quantez	Gato	Starring Fred MacMurray
1967	A Countess from Hong Kong	Harvey	Directed by Charlie Chaplin
1968	Adieu l'ami	Ely	French film; co-starring Alain Delon
1968	Double-Cross	Cass	
1969	The Sicilian Clan	Jack	French title: Le Clan des Siciliens
1971	The Man's Woman		
1974	So Sad About Gloria	Fred	Also known as Visions of Evil
1977	Satan's Cheerleaders	Monk	Final film role

=== Television ===
Year	Title	Role	Notes
1955	The Spike Jones Show	Himself	Guest appearance
1958	Kraft Television Theatre		Episode: "The Sea Is Boiling Hot"
1959	Lux Playhouse		Episode: "The Best House in the Valley"
1960	The Ed Sullivan Show	Himself	Guest (S13.E28)
1961	Follow the Sun		Episode: "The Primitive"
1971	Medical Center		Episode: "The Nowhere Child"
1971	Night Gallery		Episode: "The Last Laurel"
1975	Baretta		Episode: "On the Road"
1977	The Six Million Dollar Man		Episode: "The Infiltrators"
1977	Switch		Episode: "The Snitch"
1977	Kojak		Episode: "The Summer of '69"

=== Additional media ===
Year	Title	Role	Medium	Notes
1952	The Great Dictator (Re-issue)	Narrator	Audio/Promotion	Spoke the promotional radio spots for the re-release
1956	Bells Are Ringing	Jeff Moss	Cast Recording	Original Broadway Cast Album (Columbia Records)
1964	Funny Girl	Nick Arnstein	Cast Recording	Original Broadway Cast Album (Capitol Records)
2003	Charlie: The Life and Art of Charles Chaplin	Himself	Documentary	Directed by Richard Schickel
2003	The Chaplin Puzzle	Himself	Documentary	Archive footage and interview
