= Potboiler =

Work of dubious artistic merit, to pay the creator's daily expenses

A potboiler or pot-boiler is a novel, play, opera, film, or other creative work of low quality whose main purpose is to pay for the creator's daily expenses—thus the imagery of "boil the pot", which means "to provide one's livelihood." Authors who create potboiler novels or screenplays are sometimes called hack writers or hacks. Novels deemed to be potboilers may also be called pulp fiction, and potboiler films may be called "popcorn movies".

== Usage ==
If a serious playwright or novelist's creation is deemed a potboiler, this has a negative connotation that suggests that it is a mediocre or inferior work.

=== Historical examples ===
- In 1854 Putnam's Magazine used the term in the following sentence: "He has not carelessly dashed off his picture, with the remark that 'it will do for a pot-boiler'".
- Jane Scovell's Oona: Living in the Shadows states that "...the play was a mixed blessing. Through it O'Neill latched on to a perennial source of income, but the promise of his youth was essentially squandered on a potboiler."
- Lewis Carroll, in a letter to illustrator A. B. Frost in 1880, advises Frost not to spend his advance pay for his work on Rhyme? & Reason? lest he be forced to "do a 'pot-boiler' for some magazine" to make ends meet.
- A 1980s reviewer for Time condemned the novel Thy Brother's Wife, by Andrew Greeley, as a "putrid, puerile, prurient, pulpy potboiler".
- In the late 1990s, American author and newspaper reporter Stephen Kinzer wrote that reading a "potboiler" is "a fine form of relaxation but not exactly mind-expanding."
- In an interview with Publishers Weekly, writer David Schow described potboilers as fiction that "stacks bricks of plot into a nice, neat line".

== See also ==
- Airport novel
- Misery literature
- Pot-Bouille, an 1882 novel by Émile Zola
- Pulp fiction
