= Hezekiah Frith =

Bermudan shipowner, privateer and slave trader (1763–1848)

- Portrait of Frith
- Born: 1763; Bermuda
- Died: 1848 (aged 84–85); Bermuda
- Children: Hezekiah Frith Jr.
- Piratical career
- Type: Privateer
- Allegiance: British Empire
- Years active: 1790s–1810s
- Rank: Captain
- Base of operations: Bermuda

Hezekiah Frith, Sr. (1763 – 1848) was a Bermudian shipowner, privateer and slave trader. One of the richest men in Bermuda during the late 18th and early 19th centuries, he built the Spithead House in Warwick, Bermuda.

== Life ==
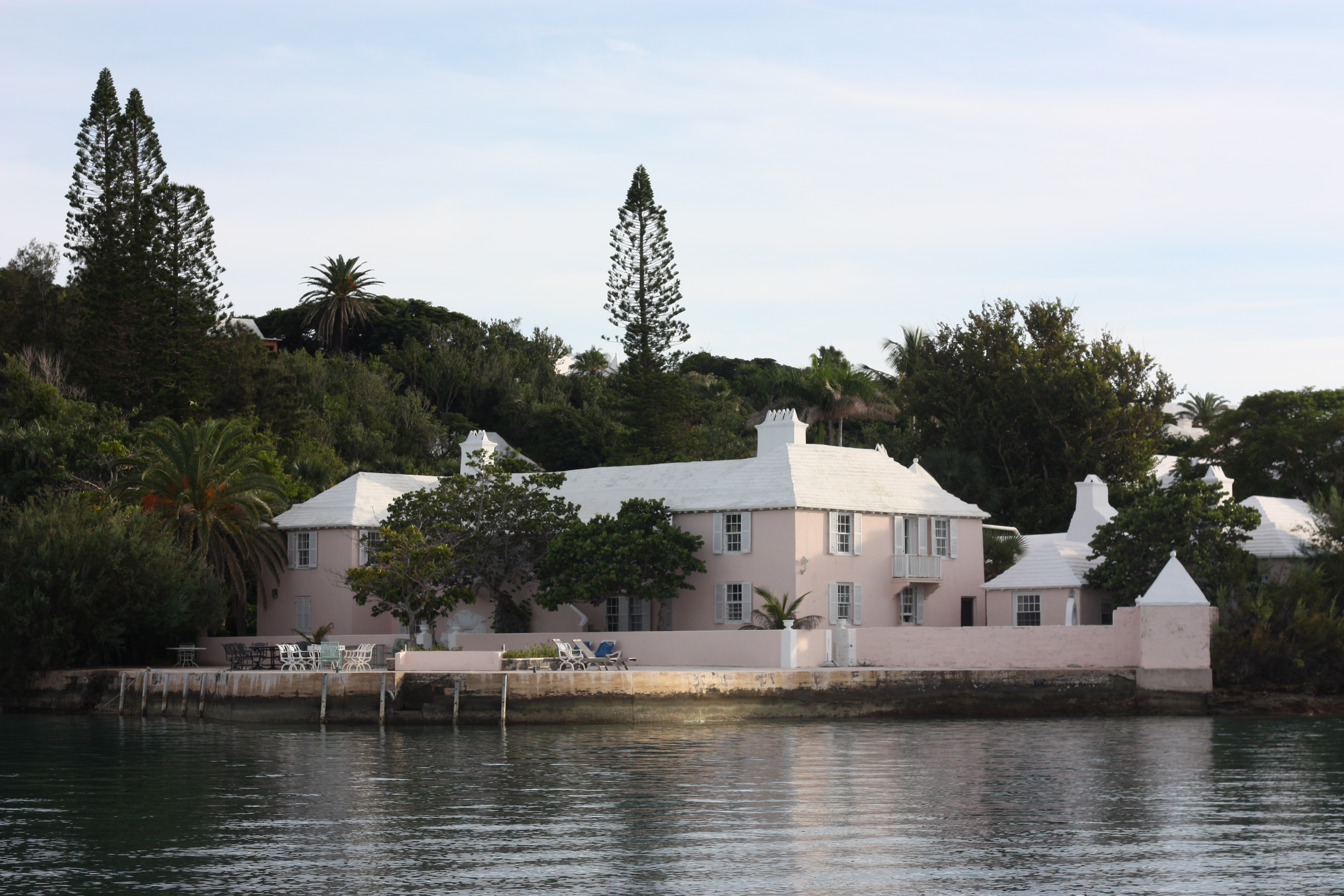
"Spithead", the 18th century Bermudian home of Hezekiah Frith and 20th century home of Eugene O'Neill and Oona O'Neill.

Born in Bermuda, he was one of seven children born to Captain William Frith and Sarah Lee. As a successful shipowner during the 1780s and 1790s, he became engaged in privateering and smuggling, from which he reportedly made his fortune. In August 1796 he slipped into the French port of Cap Français at San Domingo during the night and stole away a captured British transport ship.

Participating in a number of privateering expeditions with the Royal Navy, he is supposed to have hoarded treasure from at least two captured ships in the store he operated next to the Spithead House on Granaway Deep; he supposedly used the water tank at Spithead to smuggle captured goods and other valuable items before filing claim at the Customs House. He also has multiple accounts of robbery of ships from Jamaica. Frith is also claimed to have rescued (or kidnapped) a Frenchwoman, whom he kept there as a mistress: both are said to haunt the house, according to local lore. The house would later be owned successively by dramatist Eugene O'Neill, Sir Noël Coward and Charlie Chaplin and his wife Oona O'Neill (Lady Chaplin).

The Granaway home on Harbour Road, which he had built for his daughter, was later bought by a family of free blacks descended from a slave named Caprice, who had originally been brought to Bermuda on a ship captured by Hezekiah Frith on one of his voyages. Adele Tucker, a well-known Bermudian educator and co-founder of Bermuda Union of Teachers, grew up in the home.

He was married three times, his daughters all marrying Presbyterian ministers; his son Hezekiah Frith, Jr. became a prominent religious figure.

== Descendants ==
Brother and sister Heather Nova and Mishka, two popular Bermudian singer-songwriters, and their uncle, Michael K. Frith, are descendants of Frith.

== Slavery ==
Frith was a slave trader. He used both slaves and free men to crew his ships. As a privateer he recaptured several British slave ships and sold the captives himself.
