= Brian Large =

British television director and author (1939–2026)

Brian Large

Brian James Large (16 February 1937 – 23 May 2026) was a British television director and author. He was among the world's foremost television directors specialising in opera and classical music. After a 15-year association with BBC television his international career took him to the United States (notably the Metropolitan Opera), the Bayreuth Festival in Germany and Vienna for the New Year's Day Concerts.

== Life and career ==
=== Early life and education ===
Large was born in London, England, on 16 February 1939 and took piano lessons. He studied at the Royal Academy of Music in London, where he was appointed a Fellow of the Royal Academy in 1991. After graduating from the University of London with doctorates in both music and philosophy, he did postgraduate work in Vienna and Prague and worked at the Prague National Theatre in early 1960s. His interest in Czech and Slavic opera resulted in the publication of two pioneering volumes on the music of Bedřich Smetana and Bohuslav Martinů.

=== BBC 1965–1980 ===
Large joined BBC2 television as a director with responsibility for music and opera at its inception in 1965. He was appointed chief opera producer in 1974. During this period, alongside orchestral concerts, he produced or directed: The Burning Fiery Furnace (1969, with Pears and Britten), Peter Grimes (1969, with Pears and Britten), Idomeneo (1970, with Heather Harper, Anne Pashley, Pears and Britten), Amahl and the Night Visitors (1974, with April Cantelo, Michael Langdon, in the presence of the composer), Der fliegende Holländer (1975, Gwyneth Jones, Norman Bailey), La traviata (1975, with Elizabeth Harwood, John Brecknock, Bailey), Hänsel und Gretel (1976, with Elizabeth Gale, Patricia Parker, Ann Howard, conducted by David Lloyd-Jones, studio production) and Macbeth (1979, with Patricia Johnson, Bailey, Neil Shicoff, Nicolai Ghiaurov).

During his time at the Corporation Large directed for Britain's Royal Opera Aida, (1968, Gwyneth Jones, Grace Bumbry, Charles Craig; Edward Downes) and Otello (1981, with Carlo Cossutta, Piero Cappuccilli, Stefka Evstatieva conducted by Downes).

In 1966 the BBC commissioned an opera specifically for television from Benjamin Britten. In August 1970 Owen Wingrave, based on a short story by Henry James, was completed. Large directed and televised the world premiere conducted by the composer in November 1970. It was first broadcast on BBC2 on 16 May 1971.

He directed numerous programmes by Frederick Ashton and Kenneth MacMillan from The Royal Ballet, including Cinderella (1979, Lesley Collier, Anthony Dowell) and Sleeping Beauty (1969, Antoinette Sibley, Dowell) and (1978, Merle Park, David Wall).

Large worked with Margot Fonteyn and Rudolf Nureyev. At the BBC he also directed numerous live telecasts of concerts with:

- Claudio Abbado (Prokoviev's Piano Concerto No.3 with Martha Argerich)
- Daniel Barenboim (Dvořák Cello Concerto with Jacqueline du Pré)
- Sir John Barbirolli (Elgar symphonies and orchestral works by Delius)
- Leonard Bernstein (Stravinsky's "The Rite of Spring", Shostakovich's Symphony No 5, Sibelius' Symphony No 5)
- Sir Adrian Boult (Elgar's The Dream of Gerontius with Janet Baker, Peter Pears and John Shirley-Quirk; symphonies by Elgar and Vaughan Williams)
- Benjamin Britten (Tschaikowsky's Rococo Variations with Rostropovich; and symphonies)
- Sir Colin Davis (Shostakovich's Cello Concerti 1 & 2 with Rostropovich)
- Kirill Kondrashin (Brahms' "Double Concerto" with Oistrakh and Rostropovich)
- Igor Stravinsky (his "Firebird Ballet")
- Sir William Walton (his Belshazar's Feast).

=== International networks and opera companies ===
Grove comments that Large "always preferred to film singers live rather than allow them to mime to pre-recorded tapes", and that he paid "as much attention to the musical as to the dramatic aspects of opera direction". He was a pioneer of High Definition Television.

In 1974 Wolfgang Wagner invited Large to Bayreuth to collaborate on documenting the works of his grandfather Richard Wagner on television:

- Die Meistersinger von Nürnberg (twice: 1984 and Jerusalem) initiated a series that over twelve years
- Tannhäuser (Studer, Versalle, Brendel, Sotin; Sinopoli)
- Parsifal (1982, Jerusalem; Stein)
- Der fliegende Holländer (Estes, Balslev, Salminen, Schunk; Nelson)
- Lohengrin (twice: 1982 and 1991)

and, perhaps, one of the most acclaimed programs in the history of classical music on television, the Der Ring des Nibelungen conducted by Pierre Boulez and directed by Patrice Chéreau, for which the Royal Television Society named him "Best Television Director" in 1981.

After leaving the BBC in 1980, Large continued to direct telecasts for the Royal Opera, including:

- Les Contes d'Hoffmann (Domingo, Baltsa; Prêtre)
- La bohème (Cotrubaș, Shicoff; Gardelli)
- Die Fledermaus (Te Kanawa, Prey; Mehta)
- Der Rosenkavalier (Te Kanawa; Solti)
- Aida (Studer; Downes)
- Don Carlo (Cotrubaș, Lima; Haitink)
- Falstaff (Bruson; Giulini)
- Luisa Miller (Ricciarelli, Domingo, Bruson; Maazel).
- Roméo et Juliette (Alagna; Mackerras)
- Lorin Maazel's world premiere of 1984 (Keenlyside, Damrau; Maazel)
- Otello (Te Kanawa, Domingo; Solti)
- Simon Boccanegra (Te Kanawa; Solti)
- Stiffelio and Il trovatore (Cura, Hvorostovsky; Rizzi).

From the Glyndebourne Festival he produced broadcasts of The Makropulos Case (1979, Anja Silja; Andrew Davis) and Le comte Ory (1982, Marc Laho, Annick Massis; Davis).

Following the internationally televised Royal Opera House Gala for the Queen's Silver Jubilee in 1977, invitations came to direct performing arts programs for numerous TV networks and opera companies, including:

- Vienna State Opera
- Vienna Volksoper
- Wiener Festwochen (1995, 1996)
- Theater an der Wien
- Vienna Philharmonic concerts in Salzburg (1996, 1998–2000, 2002, 2005–2006)
- Salzburger Festspiele, opera productions (1980–2010)
- Bregenzer Festspiele where he televised La Bohème (awarded the 2003 "Grand Prix" Golden Prague Award)
- Mozartwochen Salzburg 2006
- Musikverein (1989–2009).

In 1992 Large directed a 'real-time' performance of Tosca from the sites in Rome where the opera is set for tv, using film, television and stage techniques, which was broadcast to over 90 countries worldwide to an anticipated audience of one and a half billion.

Large directed for the Vienna Philharmonic Orchestra its annual New Year's Concert from 1989 to 1993; and again from 1997 to 2009; and in 2011. In Germany he has directed for ZDF from Deutsche Oper Berlin and two concerts at the Dresdner Frauenkirche with Angela Gheorghiu and Cecilia Bartoli. Brian Large televised for Bayerischer Rundfunk from Bayerische Staatsoper, Prinzregententheater and Staatstheater am Gärtnerplatz and two special concerts from the Vatican honoring Pope Benedict XVI (Jansons 27 October 2007; Thielemann) as well as the Opening Concert of the 2006 World Cup Games (Domingo, Damrau, Lang Lang; Jansons, Mehta, Thielemann).

He directed opera productions from La Scala among others Nabucco (Dimitrova, Bruson; Muti) and from the Arena di Verona Madame Butterfly (Kabaivanska) and Tosca (Marton, Aragall). From the Mariinsky Theatre, St. Petersburg, Large has televised opera under the musical direction of Valery Gergiev including Pique Dame and the original "St. Petersburg" version of La forza del destino as well as ballet: Jewels (ballet) and Don Quixote. At the Théâtre du Châtelet in Paris he directed The Cunning Little Vixen (Mackerras, Hytner); Alceste (von Otter; Gardiner) and Orphée et Eurydice (Kožená, Gardiner). From the Théâtre des Champs-Élysées he televised "Viva Vivaldi" with Cecilia Bartoli.

From 1979 Large directed over 80 opera-, recital- and gala-telecasts from the Metropolitan Opera New York including Birgit Nilsson's final appearance as Electra (1980), the 1983–84 Spring Centennial Gala, the 1991 25th Anniversary Gala, the 1996 James Levine's 25th Anniversary gala, the 1998 Pavarotti's 30th Anniversary gala and the 2006 Farewell Gala to General Manager Joseph Volpe.

In the United States Large has televised operas from the:

- Los Angeles Opera
- San Francisco Opera
- Houston Grand Opera
- Lyric Opera of Chicago
- Washington National Opera and from the
- Philadelphia Opera

and a decade of Opening Night gala events from:

- Carnegie Hall.

Renowned conductors and orchestras he worked with include:

- Claudio Abbado (Vienna Philharmonic Orchestra; Berliner Philharmoniker)
- Daniel Barenboim (BerlinerPhilharmoniker; London Symphony Orchestra)
- Pierre Boulez (Vienna Philharmonic Orchestra)
- Valery Gergiev (Vienna Philharmonic Orchestra; Berliner Philharmoniker)
- Bernard Haitink (Berliner Philharmoniker; London Philharmonic Orchestra)
- Nikolaus Harnoncourt (Vienna Philharmonic Orchestra)
- Mariss Jansons (Vienna Philharmonic Orchestra, Symphonieorchester des Bayerischen Rundfunks)
- Carlos Kleiber (Vienna Philharmonic Orchestra)
- James Levine (Metropolitan Opera)
- Sir Neville Marriner (Academy of St Martin in the Fields, Dresdner Staatskapelle)
- Riccardo Muti (Vienna Philharmonic Orchestra; Philadelphia Orchestra)
- Seiji Ozawa (Vienna Philharmonic Orchestra; Boston Symphony Orchestra)
- Georges Prêtre (Vienna Philharmonic Orchestra; Berliner Philharmoniker)
- Sir Simon Rattle (Vienna Philharmonic Orchestra; Berliner Philharmoniker)
- Sir Georg Solti (Berliner Philharmoniker; Chicago Symphony Orchestra; London Philharmonic Orchestra)

=== Death ===
Large died on 23 May 2026, at the age of 87.

== Awards and honours ==
Large received two primetime Emmy Awards:

1992 for The Metropolitan Opera Silver Anniversary Gala (Levine, 1991) (TV) at Lincoln Center for Outstanding Individual Achievement – Classical Music/ Dance Programming – Directing; and again in 1993 for the live transmission of Tosca conducted by Zubin Mehta (1992) (TV) from Rome, seen worldwide on 106 television networks, and for Outstanding Individual Achievement – Classical Music/ Dance Programming – Directing, (shared with Giuseppe Patroni Griffi (director)).

Other honours:

1986 Large received a Peabody Award for the live CBS telecast "Sunday Morning: Vladimir Horowitz" (1986) from the Grand Hall of the Moscow Conservatory.
1981 The British Television Society recognized Large as "Best Television Director" for the Chéreau/ Boulez production of Der Ring des Nibelungen;
1990 for "The Three Tenors" FIFA world cup concert on 7 July 1990 from the Bath of Caracalla in Rome and again in
1993 for Stiffelio (Carreras) from Covent Garden
further with its Judges' Award (Programme) for outstanding achievement in the field of television direction.
1990 The British Academy of Film and Television Arts/BAFTA recognized Large as "Best Television Director" for "The Three Tenors".

For the 'excellence of his opus of more than 600 programmes,' the 44th annual Golden Prague Festival in June 2007 honored Large with a special tribute for his contribution to the industry, and named his 2006 Salzburg DVD of Mozart's Le nozze di Figaro "Best Performing Arts Programme – Opera". In 1985 the French government named Large a Chevalier de l'Ordre des Arts et des Lettres.

== Publications ==
- Smetana (London, 1970)
- Martinů (London, 1975)
- Martinů. In: 6th edition of Grove Dictionary.
- HDTV: an eye to the future
- Filming, videotaping. In: The New Grove Dictionary of Opera. Macmillan, London and New York, 1997, Vol. 2, p. 200-204.
- (Memoir) At Large: Behind the Camera with Brian Large, in collaboration with Jane Scovell.

He also translated the libretto to Wagner's The Flying Dutchman and Martinů's Julietta.

== Videography ==
- Mozart: Idomeneo (1982), Deutsche Grammophon DVD, 00440–073–4234
- The Metropolitan Opera Gala 1991, Deutsche Grammophon DVD, 00440–073–4582
- Dvořák in Prague: A Celebration (1993), Kultur Video DVD, D4211
- James Levine's 25th Anniversary Metropolitan Opera Gala (1996), Deutsche Grammophon DVD, B0004602-09
