= Christopher Chaplin =

Swiss and English composer and actor (born 1962)

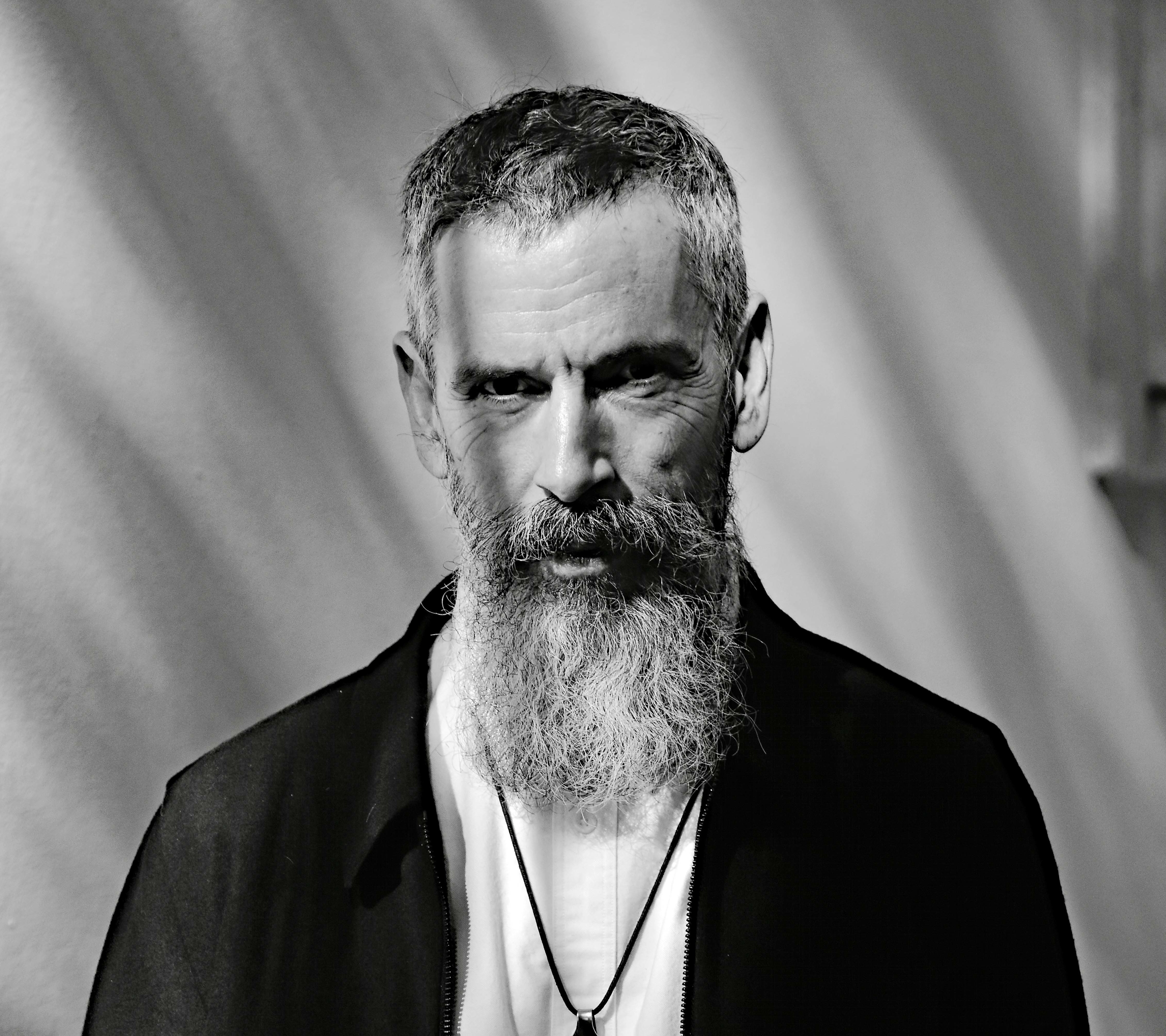
- Chaplin in 2017
- Born: Christopher James Chaplin; 8 July 1962 (age 64); Lausanne, Switzerland
- Occupations: Composer; actor
- Years active: 1983–present
- Parent(s): Charlie Chaplin; Oona O'Neill
- Relatives: See Chaplin family

Christopher James Chaplin (born 8 July 1962) is a Swiss and English composer and actor. He is the youngest son of film comedian Charlie Chaplin and his fourth wife Oona O'Neill. He is the grandson of Eugene O'Neill.

== Biography ==
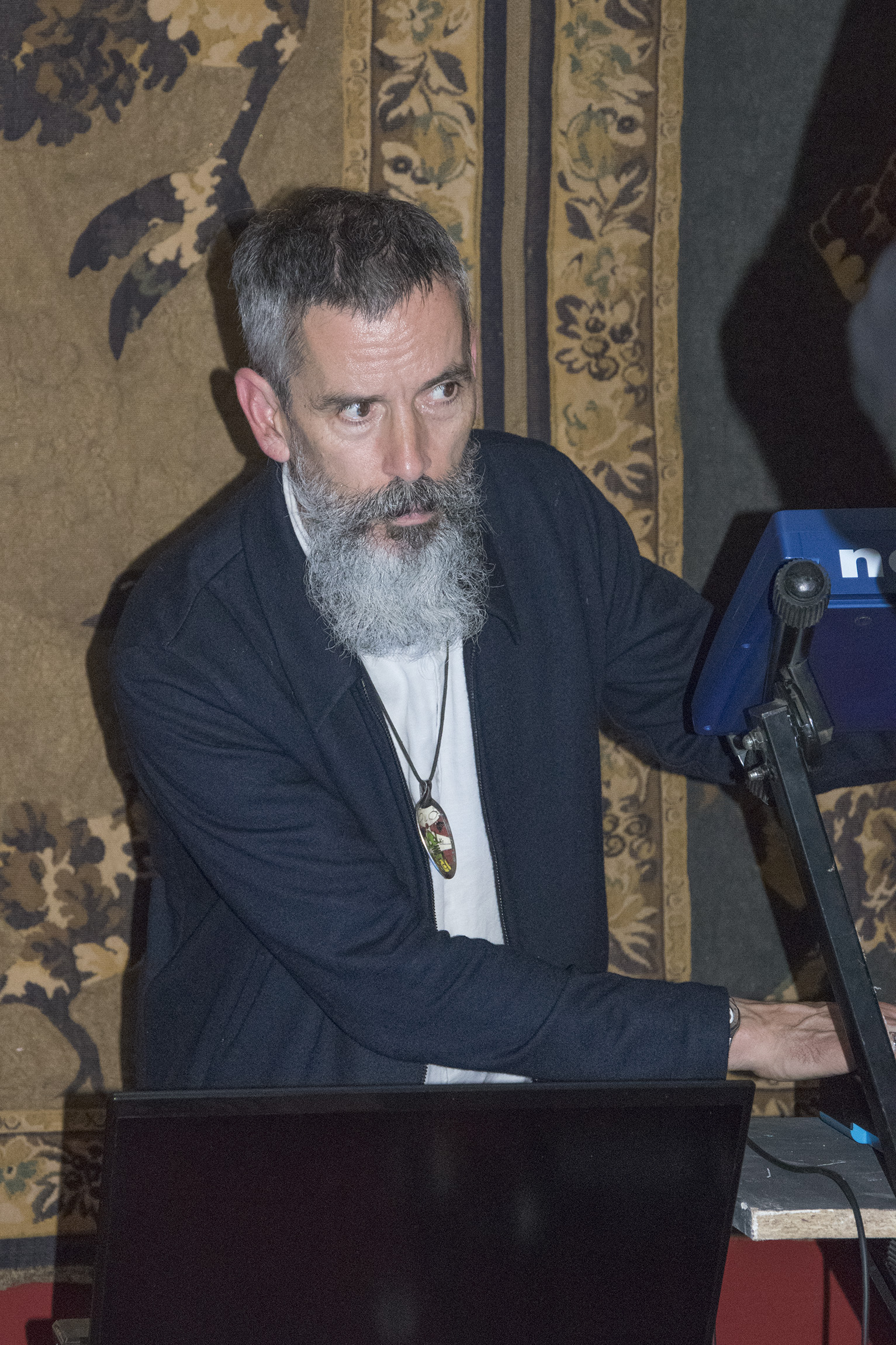
Christopher Chaplin at a concert in 2017

Christopher Chaplin was born on 8 July 1962 at Clinique de Mont Choisi in Lausanne, Switzerland. He is the youngest child of film actor Charlie Chaplin and his fourth wife Oona O'Neill: when Christopher was born, his father was 73 years old. Chaplin's father died of a stroke in 1977 at the age of 88, when he was aged 15.

Chaplin studied piano under Irene Denereaz in Vevey, then settled in London to become an actor. He made his feature film debut as Ivan in the comedy film Where Is Parsifal? (1983), screened in the Un Certain Regard section at the 1984 Cannes Film Festival, and played Jacques Sette in Charles Jarrott's TV miniseries Till We Meet Again based on the semi-autobiographical novel by Judith Krantz.

In Peter Patzak's Death of a Schoolboy, a historical biopic about the life of 17-year-old Gavrilo Princip, Chaplin took on the role of Trifco, and he played Franz Kafka in Jaromil Jireš's film Labyrinth (1991). The film received the Critic's Choice at the 1992 American Film Institute International Film Festival.

Chaplin played Rodrigo de Escobedo, the Spanish royal notary, secretary of Columbus fleet, and commander of La Navidad, in John Glen's historical film Christopher Columbus: The Discovery, released for the 500th anniversary of Columbus' voyage. In Liliane de Kermadec's return to feature film, the French period road movie La Piste du télégraphe (lit. 'The Telegraph Road') (1994), Chaplin played John alongside Elena Safonova's Lisa Alling. He played French poet Charles Cros in Agnieszka Holland's historical account of the relationship between Paul Verlaine and Arthur Rimbaud, Total Eclipse (1995).

Since 2005, Chaplin has focused on a career as a composer, and has collaborated with German experimental, ambient and electronic musician Hans-Joachim Roedelius, amongst others. In 2010, he signed to Fabrique Records, and released his solo debut album Je suis le Ténébreux in 2016.

== Discography ==
- Seven Echoes – Kava & Christopher Chaplin (2010, Fabrique Records)
- King of Hearts – Hans-Joachim Roedelius & Christopher Chaplin (2012, Sub Rosa)
- Je suis le Ténébreux – Christopher Chaplin (2016, Fabrique Records) – featuring Hans-Joachim Roedelius, Christine Roedelius, Judith Chemla, Claudia Schumann, Pino Costalunga
- Deconstructed (Remix EP) – Christopher Chaplin (2017, Fabrique Records) – featuring reworks by Tim Story, Jana Irmert, Peter Zirbs, <tfo>
- Triptych in Blue – Hans-Joachim Roedelius, Christopher Chaplin & Andrew Heath (2017, Disco Gecko Recordings)
- Paradise Lost – Christopher Chaplin (2018, Fabrique Records) – featuring Leslie Winer, Nathan Vale
- BJARMI – Christopher Chaplin & Stereo Hypnosis (2019, Fabrique Records)
- M – Christopher Chaplin (2020, Fabrique Records) – featuring Finley Quaye, Aurelia Thierree, Mira Lu Kovacs
- Enosh – Christopher Chaplin (2020, Fabrique Records)
- Jared – Christopher Chaplin (2021, Fabrique Records)
- Patriarchs – Christopher Chaplin (2021, Fabrique Records)
- Patriarchs Live – Christopher Chaplin (2023, Fabrique Records)
- Door 1 Door 2 – Christopher Chaplin (2024, Fabrique Records)
- Road to Rosslyn – Christopher Chaplin (2026, Curious Music)

=== Remixes ===
- "Slippery Forces" – Boz Boorer (2012, Fabrique Records)
- "Virtue" – Loretta Who (2016, Fabrique Records)

== Filmography ==
Film performances
Year	Title	Role	Notes
1984	Where Is Parsifal?	Ivan	
1989	Judith Krantz's Till We Meet Again	Jacques Sette	
1990	Death of a Schoolboy	Trifco	
1991	Labyrinth	Franz Kafka	
1992	Christopher Columbus: The Discovery	Rodrigo de Escobedo	
1994	La Piste du télégraphe	John	
1995	Total Eclipse	Charles Cros	
2001	Far from China	Port	
2017	Je suis le ténébreux		Short Film
2024	Chaplin: Spirit of the Tramp	Self	Documentary film
