= Aloïse (film) =

1975 film

- Theatrical release poster
- Directed by: Liliane de Kermadec
- Written by: Liliane de Kermadec; André Téchiné
- Produced by: Alain Dahan
- Starring: Isabelle Huppert
- Cinematography: Jean Penzer
- Edited by: Claudine Merlin
- Distributed by: S.E. Framo
- Release date: 2 April 1975
- Running time: 115 minutes
- Country: France
- Language: French

Aloïse is a 1975 French drama film directed by Liliane de Kermadec. It was entered into the 1975 Cannes Film Festival.

Tim Palmer has written about this film in his article, "Enraged to Live: Reviving Liliane de Kermadec’s Aloïse," in French Screen Studies.

== Plot ==
The unsuccessful Swiss artist Aloïse Corbaz finds work at the court of the German emperor and gets infatuated. Showing frank symptoms of insanity she is hospitalised.

== Cast ==
- Isabelle Huppert - Aloïse jeune / Aloïse as a child
- Delphine Seyrig - Aloïse adulte / Aloïse as an adult
- Marc Eyraud - Le père d'Aloïse / Aloïse's father
- Michael Lonsdale - Le médecin directeur / The second doctor
- Valérie Schoeller - Élise jeune / Élise as a child
- Monique Lejeune - Élise adulte / Élise as an adult
- Julien Guiomar - Le directeur de théâtre
- Roger Blin - Le professeur de chant / The singing teacher
- Jacques Debary - the old director
- Roland Dubillard - the teacher
- Jacques Weber -the engineer
- Nita Klein - the head nurse
- Hans Verner - the chaplain
- Alice Reichen - 'la microphonée'
- François Chatelet - the priest
- Fernand Guiot - the priest in the asylum
