= Where Is Parsifal? =

- Italian DVD cover
- Directed by: Henri Helman
- Written by: Berta Domínguez D.
- Produced by: Terence Young
- Starring: Tony Curtis; Cassandra Domenica; Erik Estrada; Peter Lawford; Ron Moody; Donald Plesence; Orson Welles
- Cinematography: Norman G. Langley
- Edited by: Peter Hollywood; Russell Lloyd
- Music by: Ivan Jullien; Hubert Rostaing
- Production company: Slenderline
- Distributed by: J. Arthur Rank Film Distributors
- Release dates: 22 May 1984 (Cannes); 19 July 1985
- Running time: 87 minutes
- Country: United Kingdom
- Languages: English; French

Where Is Parsifal? is a 1984 British comedy film directed by Henri Helman and starring Tony Curtis, Cassandra Domenica, Erik Estrada, Peter Lawford (in his final film role), Ron Moody, Donald Pleasence and Orson Welles. It was written by Berta Dominguez D.

== Plot ==
Parsifal Katzenellenbogen is an eccentric hypochondriac who has invented a laser skywriter. Parsifal invites businessmen to his castle in the hopes of selling his invention. Potential buyers include gangster Henry Board II accompanied by has-been movie star Montague Chippendale, Scotsman Mackintosh, and Romani Klingsor.

== Cast ==
- Tony Curtis as Parsifal Katzenellenbogen
- Berta Domínguez as D.Elba (as Cassandra Domenica)
- Erik Estrada as Henry Board II
- Peter Lawford as Montague Chippendale
- Ron Moody as Beersbohm
- Donald Pleasence as Mackintosh
- Orson Welles as Klingsor
- Christopher Chaplin as Ivan
- Nancy Roberts as Ruth
- Ava Lazar as Sheila
- Vladek Sheybal as Morjack

== Reception ==
Kim Newman wrote in The Monthly Film Bulletin : "Occasionally, a movie is so perversely ill-conceived that one begins to suspect that something like the cinema equivalent of vanity publishing is responsible for the production. Here, an incredibly diverse group of variously talented players are gathered together in a prop-filled room to shout at and fall over each other in the service of a script that seems to be patterned remotely on You Can't Take It with You. Tony Curtis mugs energetically in the lead, and manages to be exhaustingly unamusing, while the various supporting actors range from the ludicrously miscast (Donald Pleasence as a kilted, Rabbie Burns-quoting Scot) to simple token presences (Vladek Sheybal as a mysterious magician, totally unconnected to the plot)."

Variety wrote: "Ludicrous beyond belief, Where Is Parsifal? is one of those pictures that makes one wonder how it got made at all. Frenetic, pathetic comedy has spun out of control even before the main titles are over, and commercial potential is nil. Structurally, film is a variation on You Can't Take It With You, except screenwriter Berta Dominguez D (who also acts under the name of Cassandra Domenica) forgot to put in any funny lines. ... Henri Helman has directed as if in desperate imitation of the 1960s comedy styles of Clive Donner or Joseph McGrath. Actually, Ron Moody does get off some self-contained moments as a Prussian aide-de-camp, the score by Hubert Rostaing and Ivan Jullien is attractive and the production looks decent. But it's a fiasco from start to finish."

== Preservation status ==
The British Film Institute included Where Is Parsifal? as a lost film in its 2010 "75 Most Wanted" list, noting:

Following a May 1984 Cannes premiere, Rank Film Distributors scheduled it to open in Britain on 19 July 1985. It then seems to have been withdrawn with only a few days' notice . ... It has never been given a video release in Britain, and there is no record of a television airing. Internationally, it seems to have opened theatrically in France on 13 April 1988, and has had dubbed VHS releases in Italy (C'è qualcosa di strano in famiglia, RCA) and Germany (Die Himmelmaschine, Taurus Video). It has never opened in the US, and doesn't seem to have had a legitimate DVD release anywhere.

Its status was updated to "found" after director Helman donated his personal print to the BFI. The BFI National Archive holds a collection of ephemera, stills and video materials.

In May 2013, the film appeared on Netflix streaming.
