= Labyrinth (1991 film) =

- Directed by: Jaromil Jireš
- Written by: Hans-Jörg Weyhmüller; Alex Koenigsmark; Jaromil Jireš
- Starring: Maximilian Schell; Christopher Chaplin; Vlastimil Brodský
- Cinematography: Ivan Vojnár
- Edited by: Alois Fischarek
- Music by: Luboš Fišer
- Release date: 1991
- Running time: 90 minutes
- Countries: Germany; Czechoslovakia
- Language: Czech

Labyrinth is a 1991 German–Czech drama film directed by Jaromil Jireš. The film depicts Maximilian Schell playing himself investigating the life and influences of Franz Kafka played by Christopher Chaplin, and marked Jireš's return to film after having worked with television and documentaries for a number of years.

First screened on 22 October 1991 at Laemmle Monica 2 in Los Angeles, Labyrinth received the Critic's Choice at the 1992 American Film Institute International Film Festival.

== Cast ==
- Vlastimil Brodský
- Christopher Chaplin as Franz Kafka
- Miloš Kopecký as Rabbi Löw
- Maximilian Schell as himself
- Christian Thuri as David
