= Manhattan's Babe =

2014 novel by Frédéric Beigbeder

- Author: Frédéric Beigbeder
- Original title: Oona et Salinger
- Translator: Adam Biles
- Language: French
- Publisher: Éditions Grasset
- Publication date: 20 August 2014
- Publication place: France
- English publication date: 27 December 2016
- Pages: 336
- ISBN: 978-2-246-77701-4

Manhattan's Babe (French: Oona et Salinger, lit. 'Oona and Salinger') is a 2014 novel by the French writer Frédéric Beigbeder. It is about the failed romance between the young Oona O'Neill and J. D. Salinger.

== Plot ==
Oona O'Neill is the daughter of the playwright Eugene O'Neill and an it girl in New York. In 1940, when she is 15 years old, she visits the Stork Club where she meets the short story writer Jerry Salinger who immediately falls in love with her. They flirt during the night, but Oona is quickly tired of him and moves on, and Jerry is soon drafted into the military. Oona begins a career as a Hollywood actress and meets Charlie Chaplin, who seduces her and marries her in 1943, when she is 18 and he 54. Hearing about this, Jerry is filled with jealousy and bitterness.

== Reception ==
Jérôme Dupuis of L'Express called it a "fluid and well-documented story" and complimented its fictional, desperate letters from Salinger to Oona. Dupuis was negative to Beigbeder's sometimes failed "pirouettes", where he tries to incorporate unrelated material such as flirting advice, parallels to contemporary French celebrities, or the story of how Beigbeder fell in love with his wife at first sight when she was 20 and he was 45. Eric Chevillard of Le Monde criticised the degree to which Beigbeder made the story about himself and wrote that "Salinger, Chaplin & Me" would have been a more fitting title. Kirkus Reviews highlighted the part about World War II and described Beigbeder's writing as cinematic, calling it "romantic, analytical, sometimes excessively cute".
