= La Piste du télégraphe =

- Poster
- Directed by: Liliane de Kermadec
- Written by: Liliane de Kermadec
- Produced by: Cinébravo
- Starring: Elena Safonova, Christopher Chaplin
- Cinematography: Iouri Liubchin
- Edited by: Aurique Delannoy
- Music by: Antoine Duhamel
- Distributed by: Les Acacias Cinéaudience
- Release date: 30 November 1994
- Running time: 116 minutes
- Country: France
- Language: French

La Piste du télégraphe (lit. 'The Telegraph Road') is a 1994 French drama film directed by Liliane de Kermadec. A 1927 period road movie with minimal episodic plot, the film follows Russian-born Lisa Alling played by Elena Safonova on foot from New York towards her homeland Siberia, and her encounter with John played by Christopher Chaplin. The film has music by French composer Antoine Duhamel.

== Cast ==
- Elena Safonova as Lisa Alling
- Christopher Chaplin as John
- Alexandre Arbatt as Mike
- Mylène Demongeot as Muriel
- Miki Manojlović as Carlo
- Cong Shan as Shan
- Sergey Shnyrev as the journalist
- Jean-Yves Gautier as the pilot
- Rémy Roubakha as Billy
- Alexander Lykov as the vagabond
- Wladimir Tsarev as Harvey
- Aleksei Rodionov as Alastair
- Alexandre Kalinski as David
- Alla Budnitskaya as John's mother
- Aleksandr Belyavsky as John's father
- Olga Tchernov as Louise
- Ludmilla Korik as Angela
- Serguei Stegalov as Malcolm
- Oleg Banikov as Doug
- Alexandre Mazourienko as Tom
- Boris Bystrov as Scotty
- Oleg Miteen as Michael
- Vladimir Chykov as George
