= Adele Tucker =

Bermudian schoolteacher and trade unionist

Adele Evelina Johnson Tucker MBE (8 August 1868 – 4 January 1971) was a Bermudian schoolteacher and trade unionist. She is best known as one of the founders of the Bermuda Union of Teachers, the first registered union on the island.

Tucker was born in Warwick Parish, one of eight children born to Catherine and Thomas Tucker. She reputedly grew up in a house built by Hezekiah Frith, an 18th-century privateer. Tucker's father worked as a mason. She left school at the age of 13, a year after her mother's death, in order to assist with the housework. At the age of 18, Tucker found work in Hamilton as an assistant at a school run by Jairus Swan. In 1892, she began attending the Collegiate Institute, a teachers' college run by the African Methodist Episcopal Church. She subsequently served as principal of the Edmonson School in Warwick from 1896 to 1901, and then in 1902 took over the Paget Glebe School in Hamilton. She never married, but she and her sisters raised two children that had been orphaned by one of their cousins.

In 1903, Tucker appeared before a commission into the school system, making a range of complaints about low salaries, understaffing, and underresourcing. After the deaths of several impoverished young teachers, she and three others – Rufus Stovell, Edith Crawford, and Matilda Crawford – formed the Bermuda Union of Teachers in 1919 to lobby for better conditions. She served as the first treasurer of the organisation, which in 1947 became the first trade union in Bermuda to achieve legal recognition (following the passage of a new law). Tucker was forcibly retired from teaching at the age of 65, but remained involved in a number of community organisation. In the 1951 Birthday Honours, she was made a Member of the Order of the British Empire. She became something of a celebrity in old age, and was frequently interviewed by newspapers on her birthdays. Tucker died at the age of 102, and her funeral was attended by Henry Tucker, the Government Leader. She has appeared on Bermudian postal stamps as part of the "Pioneers of Progress" series.
