= Manoir de Ban =

Biographical museum in Switzerland

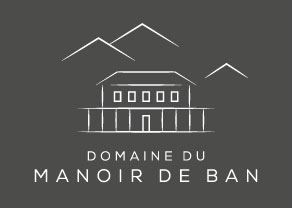

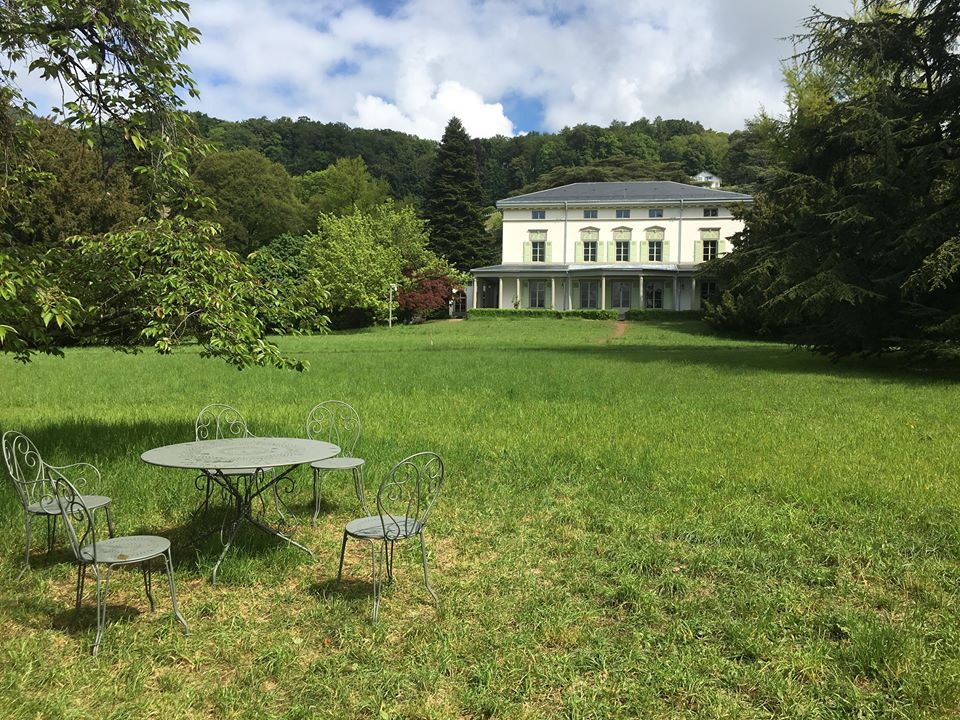
- Interactive map of the Manoir de Ban area

General information
- Type: Manor house
- Architectural style: neoclassical
- Location: Corsier-sur-Vevey, Switzerland
- Coordinates: 46°28′32″N 6°51′05″E
- Construction started: 1840 (186 years ago)
- Owner: Charlie Chaplin; Genii Capital (since 2008)

Technical details
- Size: 12,378 sq ft (1,150.0 m^{2})

Design and construction
- Architect: Philippe Franel

Website
- manoirdeban.com

The Manoir de Ban, or Champ de Ban Estate Manor, is a manor house located at Corsier-sur-Vevey on the banks of Lake Geneva in Switzerland.

The property is known for having been actor, filmmaker and composer Charlie Chaplin's home for twenty-five years, from 1952 until his death in 1977. It houses a museum dedicated to the life and work of its former owner, named Chaplin's World, which opened in April 2016 after fifteen years in development.

The manor is listed as a heritage site of Swiss Inventory of Cultural Property of National Significance.

== Location ==
The manor lies on the Champ de Ban Estate, above Corsier-sur-Vevey, a wine-growing village on the Swiss Riviera. The 14-hectare (35-acre) estate lies in stunning countryside, between the Lavaux vineyards (a UNESCO World Heritage Site), Lake Geneva and the peaks of the Swiss Alps.

The estate is 9 km from Montreux, 26 km from Lausanne and 91 km from Geneva.

== History ==
=== Construction and successive alterations ===
Before the manor was built, Champ de Ban was a farm. Still standing from this era are a fountain and the farm building on the Fenil road, which has seen many alterations over the years.

Charles Emile Henri de Scherer (1791–1871) bought the estate on 27 May 1839. In 1840, he had a neoclassical mansion built on the site. It was recorded in the land registry in 1841.

The first plans drafted by architect Philippe Franel (1796–1867) date from September 1839. Franel was the Riviera's star architect at the time. He was responsible for various prestigious buildings in the Vevey region: the Clock Tower, the Trois-Couronnes hotel, Aile Castle, the Part-Dieu building and numerous local houses. Franel was both a carpenter and an architect, and studied in Basel and Zürich. Examples of his work can still be seen throughout the Riviera today.

As the cellars of the house show, and as can be seen in the environmental report from the town plan (which mentions vineyards on a currently wooded area in the south of the grounds), wine was also produced on the estate at one time.

The house was not named "Manoir de Ban" until 1946, following alterations carried out by the new owners, American diplomat Grafton Winthrop Minot and his wife Anne de Lancey.

=== Chronological list of owners ===
- Michel de Crausaz, Lord of the Manor of Corsier Parish (shown on a plan from 1705)
- Jean-Pierre Chiron, Captain (shown on a plan from 1776)
- Abram David Doron Louis De Lom, Captain (before 1839)
- Henri Baud (before 1839)
- 27 May 1839: Charles Emile Henri de Scherer – he had the house built (which later became the manor) and had the grounds landscaped.
- 3 May 1871: on Mr de Scherer's death, his second wife Jeanne-Marie Adélaïde de Winterfeld inherited the property.
- 27 December 1898: the heirs of Mrs de Winterfeld (who did not have any children)
- 27 November 1911: sisters Dorothée Rosalie and Rosalia de Winterfeld
- 12 June 1914: Louis Alfred Friedel, a gentleman of private means
- 6 June 1919: Charles-Louis Bonny, a watchmaker
- 14 April 1938: ownership passed to Crédit Foncier Vaudois
- 3 July 1939: Wilhelm Imperatori, an industrialist
- 28 May 1940: on the death of Wilhelm Imperatori, his widow Edit Imperatori inherited the property. During the Second World War, she opened the house to refugees.
- 9 December 1946: purchased by Grafton Winthrop Minot, an American diplomat, and his wife Anne de Lancey. They named the house "Manoir de Ban".
- 31 December 1952: purchased by Charlie Chaplin
- 25 December 1977: Charlie Chaplin died and his wife Oona inherited the manor
- 27 September 1991: Oona Chaplin died and her children inherited the manor. They later entrusted it to the Charlie Chaplin Museum Foundation.
- 8 April 2008: Genii Capital, a Luxembourg-based capital investment company, purchased the manor from the Charlie Chaplin Museum Foundation to secure the future of the Charlie Chaplin museum project.

=== Charlie Chaplin's home from 1952 ===
In September 1952, Chaplin was on his way to Europe to promote his film Limelight when he learned that the U.S. had revoked his visa. The Chaplin family needed a new address in Europe and, on the advice of Charlie's half-brother Sydney, they visited Switzerland.

The family moved in on 6 January 1953. Although they had bought the manor furnished, the Chaplin family and their architects, Burnat and Nicati, renovated the property and reorganised the interior. Chaplin's wife, Oona, was pregnant with their fifth child on their arrival in Switzerland, and the couple went on to have eight children in total.

Chaplin lived at the manor for twenty-five years until his death in 1977. He spent his "happy years" there, walking in the grounds, playing with his children and hosting friends from the four corners of the globe, including actor Marlon Brando and writer Truman Capote.

Chaplin also spent a large percentage of his time working. The screenplays for his films A King in New York (1957), A Countess from Hong Kong (1967) and The Freak (which was never filmed) were written at Manoir de Ban. He reworked the music for his films at the piano and wrote My Autobiography, published in 1964.

Sir Charles and his wife, Lady Oona, are buried in Corsier-sur-Vevey cemetery.

== Description ==
=== The Manor ===
The manor is a rectangular building with two side annexes with roof terraces. The facades are richly decorated for the period: the front door is flanked by fluted pilasters and the windows are outlined with fillets and rest on moulded sills on consoles. The window frames are topped with cornices or pediments. Under the hipped slate roof, the eaves are adorned with modillions. On the ground floor, a peristyle runs right across the back of the manor and extends onto the sides, towards the annexes. This Colonial-style gallery has views of the park, the lake and the mountains.

After renovations carried out for the Chaplin family in 1952, the manor comprised nineteen rooms on three levels (the second attic floor was converted in 1977) providing 1,150m² of living space. In the basement lie the cellars inherited from the building's wine-making past. Chaplin had this area converted into constant-humidity archives to house his original works.

The manor was richly decorated, including marble mosaics or solid-wood parquet on the floors and carvings on the walls. The property was furnished when Chaplin bought it. Some of the furniture, purchased by Anne de Lancey, the previous owner, originated from one of the Loire Châteaux in France. The Chaplin family also had their own furniture transported from California.

=== Outbuildings ===
The property includes a farm which pre-dates the manor. It was altered several times, and under the Chaplin family served as staff accommodation, stables, a barn and a store.

Another building, a garage dating from 1900 and renovated around 1980, had space for three vehicles plus staff accommodation on the upper floor. The Chaplin family employed up to thirteen staff: a secretary, nursery nurses, governesses, cooks, gardeners and chauffeurs.

=== Grounds ===
The Champ de Ban estate is one of the largest parks in the canton of Vaud. It covers almost fourteen hectares, sloping gently down to the banks of the Veveyse and the Nant stream. Charles Emile Henri de Scherer employed Edmond Davall, a forestry engineer, to carry out initial landscaping in the park in 1840–50. He appears to have introduced numerous exotic trees with a view to them becoming acclimatised.

The estate includes:

- a 6.1-hectare park with natural lawns and clusters of well-established trees including beeches, maples, elms, spruces, sequoia and cedars.
- an orchard bordering the farm, a greenhouse dating from 1965 adjacent to a garage and a kitchen garden which Chaplin enjoyed tending, a courtyard, a fountain, a swimming pool and a tennis court.
- a 7.5-hectare terraced forest of mainly deciduous trees. The wooded area in the south of the estate was formerly a vineyard.

== Chaplin's World museum ==
Chaplin's World opened on 17 April 2016 at the Ban estate.

The tour begins in the manor with the story of Chaplin's personal and family life before moving on to a new building, dedicated to his public life and career. In total, the museum incorporates over 4,000m² of exhibition space. It is operated by Grévin, a subsidiary of Compagnie des Alpes.

It also includes a venue for temporary exhibitions and private functions, catering facilities and a souvenir shop. The museum's developers worked to restore the manor and grounds to their former glory while preserving the authentic traces of Chaplin's personal life.

Chaplin Museum Development initiated the museum project in 2000. The project became possible when the Luxembourgish company Genii Capital purchased the manor in April 2008, and thanks to the support of the Chaplin family, Roy Export and Bubbles Incorporated (which holds the rights to Chaplin's intellectual property and heritage), canton of Vaud and ten local municipalities, and Nestlé, a partner in the development of the museum.

== Key dates ==
- 1840: The manor is built
- 1952: Charlie Chaplin moves into the manor
- 1977: Death of Charlie Chaplin
- 2000: Chaplin Museum Development begins the museum project
- 2008: Luxembourg company Genii Capital purchases the manor
- 2013: Construction work on the Charlie Chaplin museum begins
- 2014: An agreement is reached with Compagnie des Alpes/Grévin to operate the museum
- 2016: Chaplin's World opens on the 17 April

== Gallery ==
=== Outdoor area ===
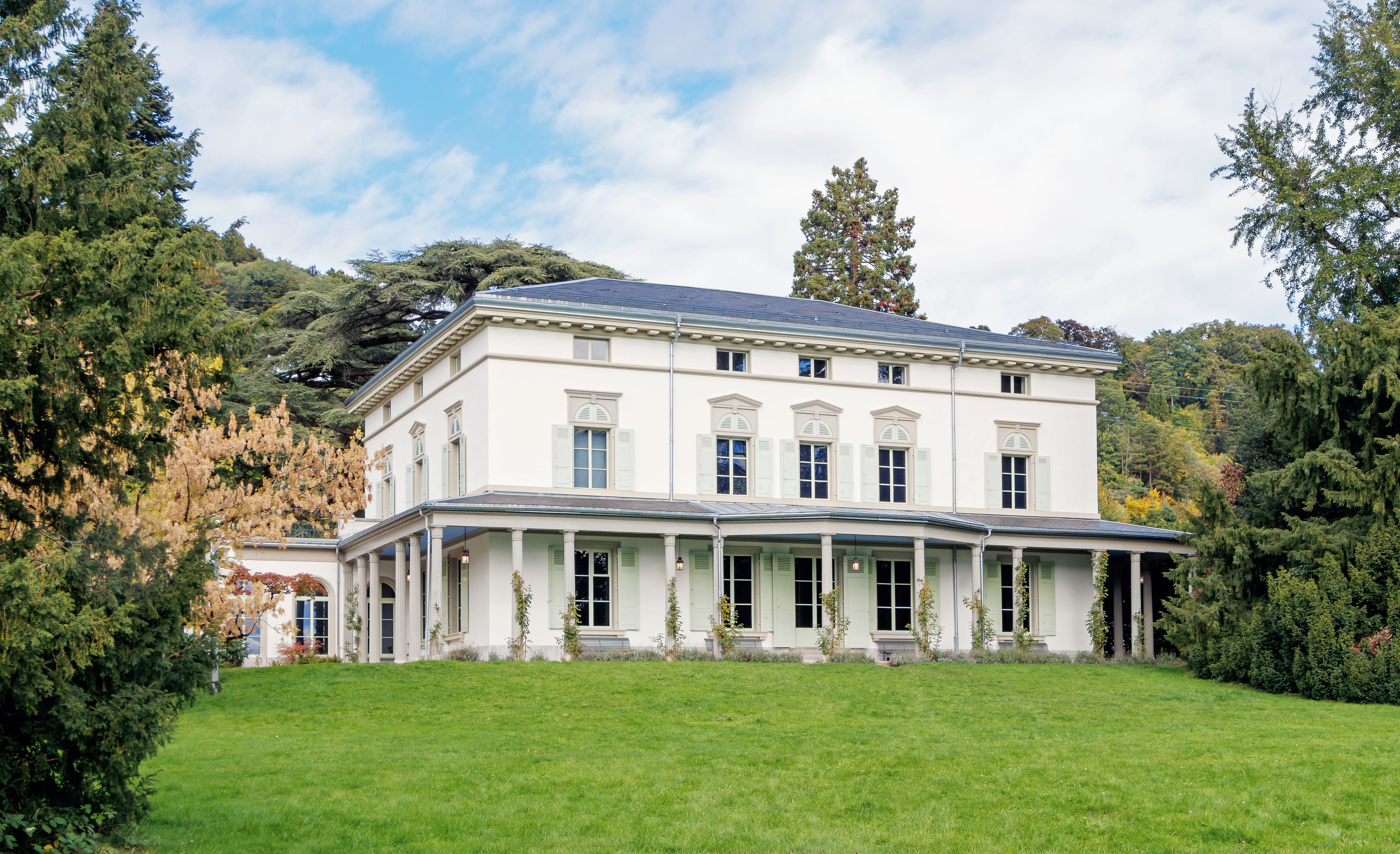
Manoir de Ban

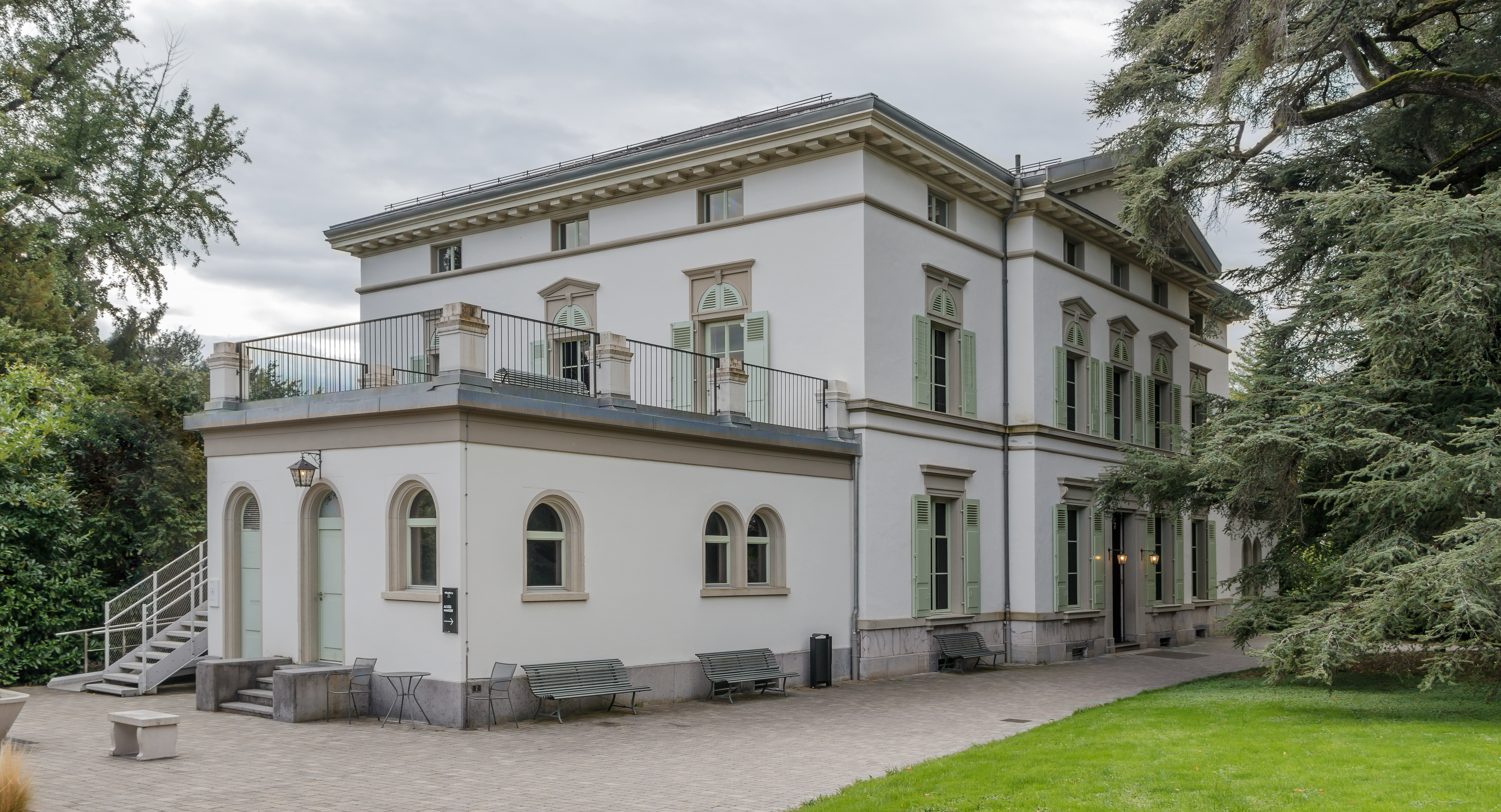
Manoir de Ban, view from northeast

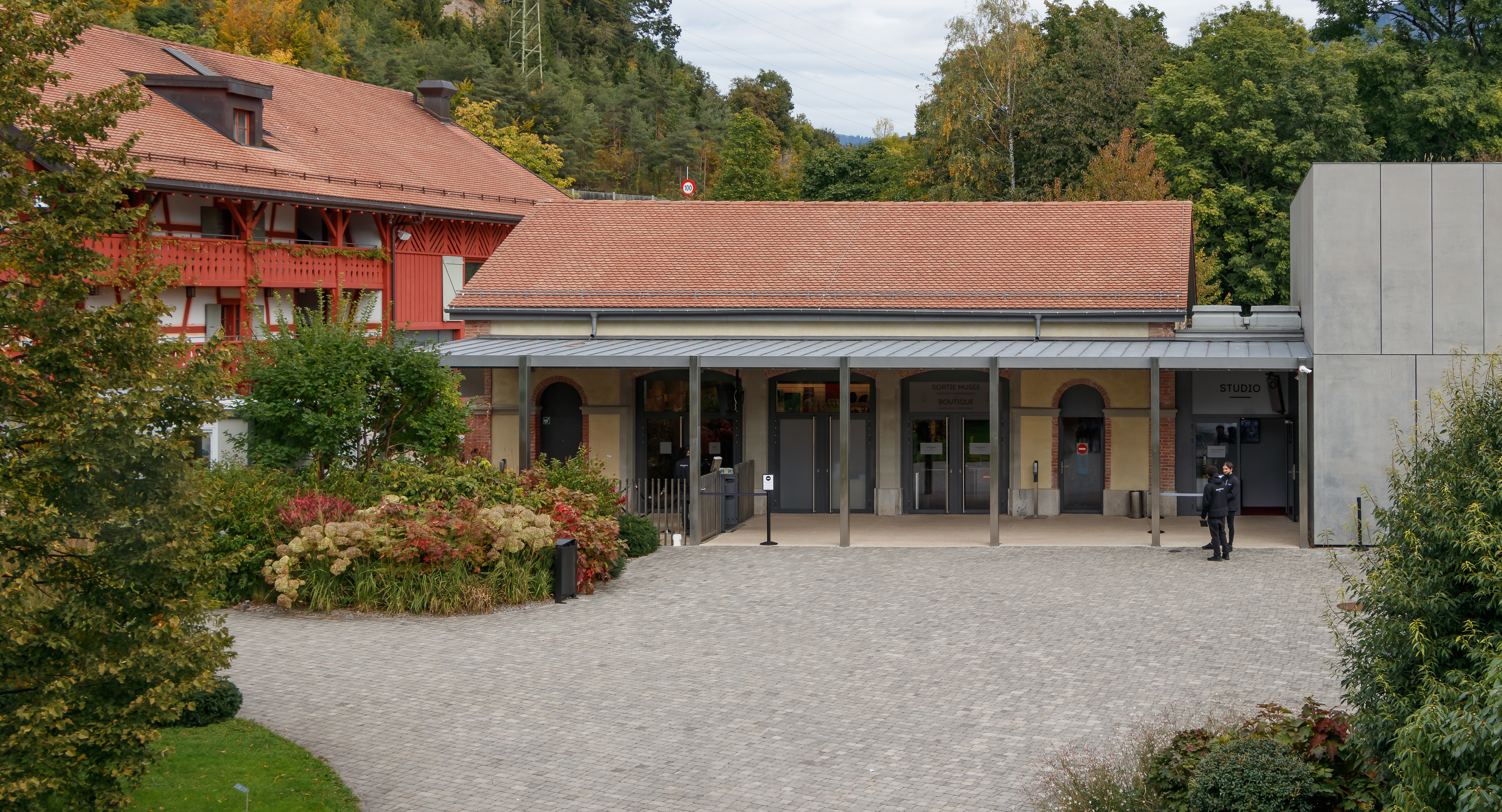
Entrance area of the new museum building

=== Interior ===
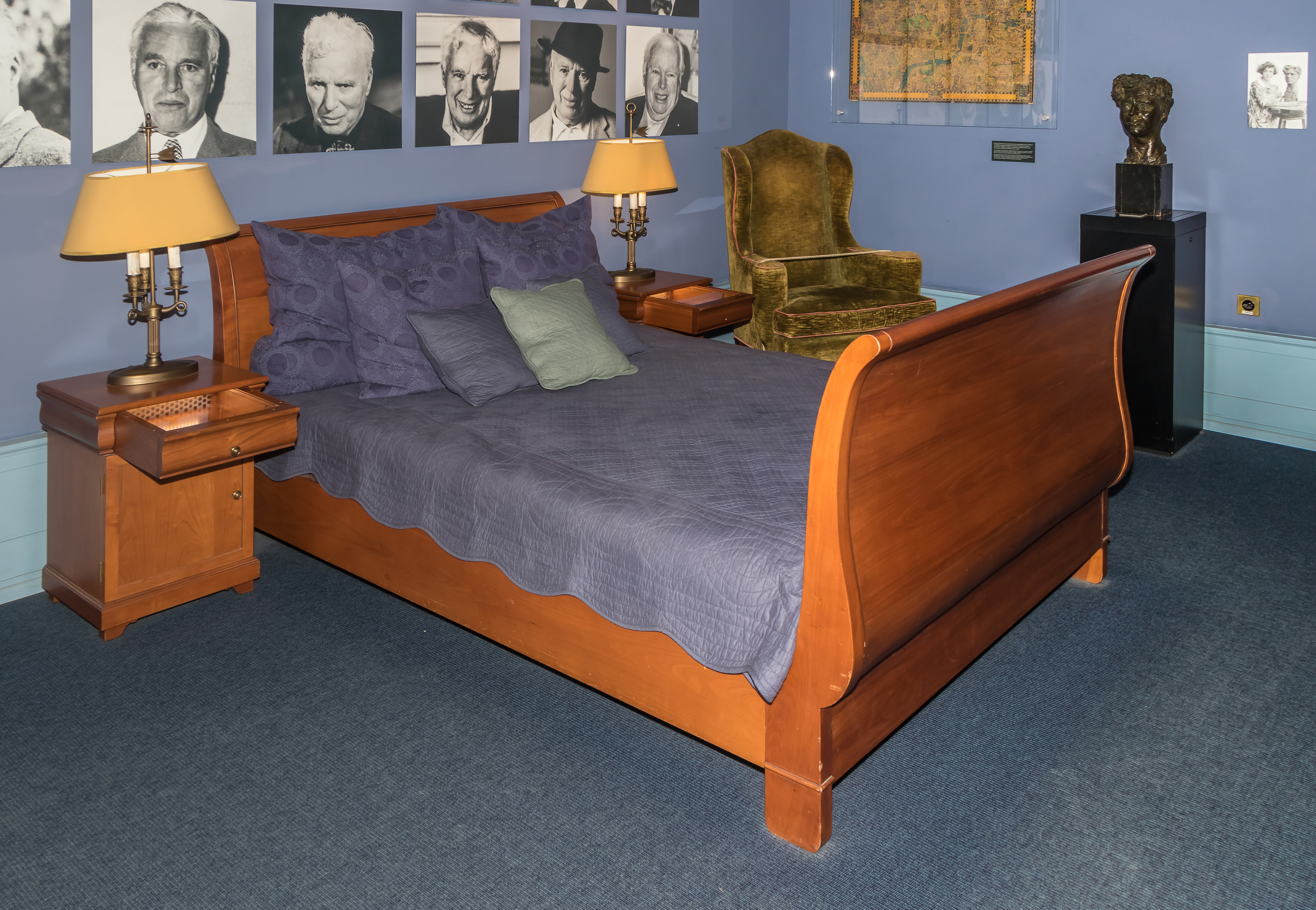
Charlie Chaplin's bed

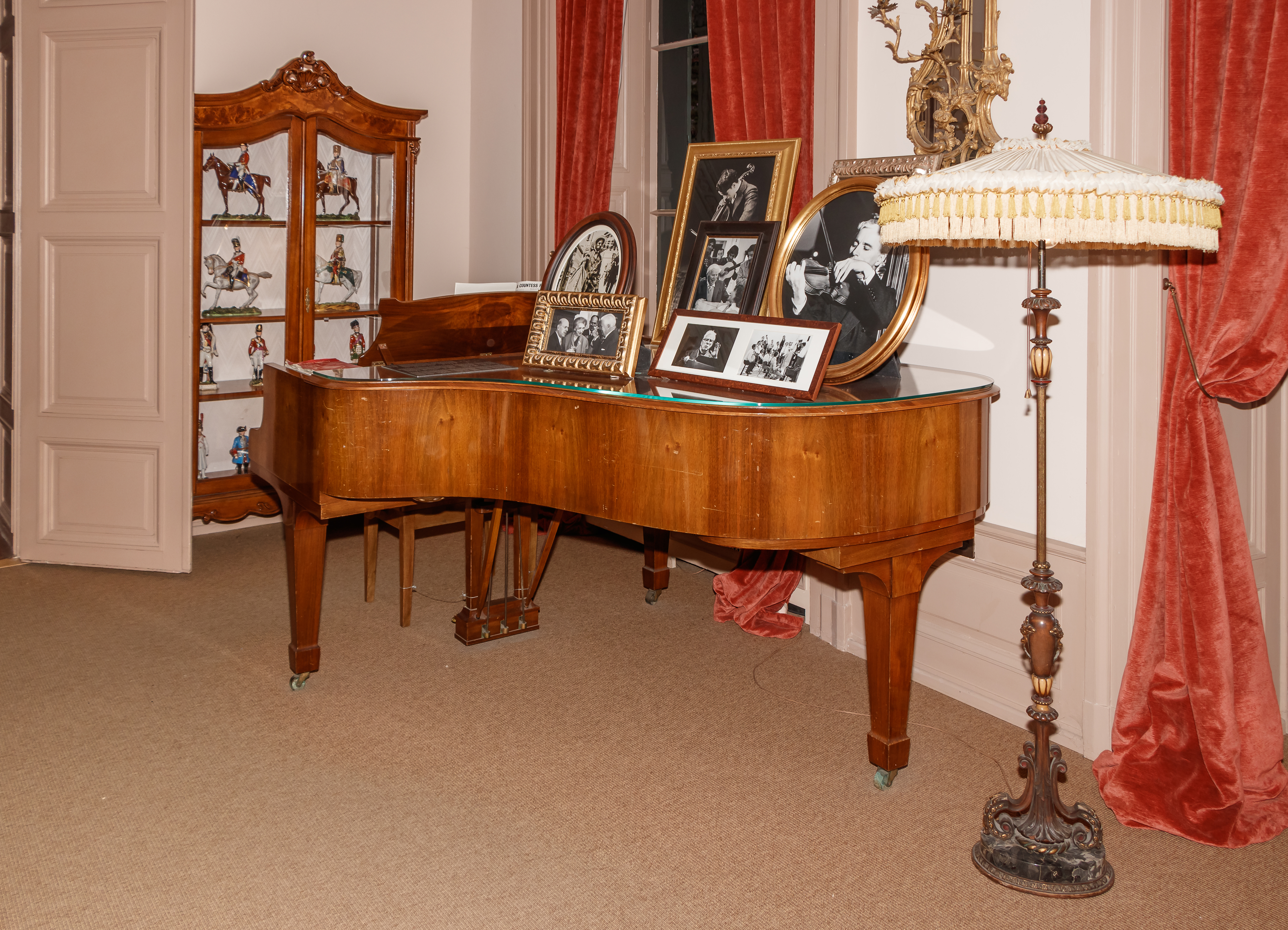
Grand piano in the living room

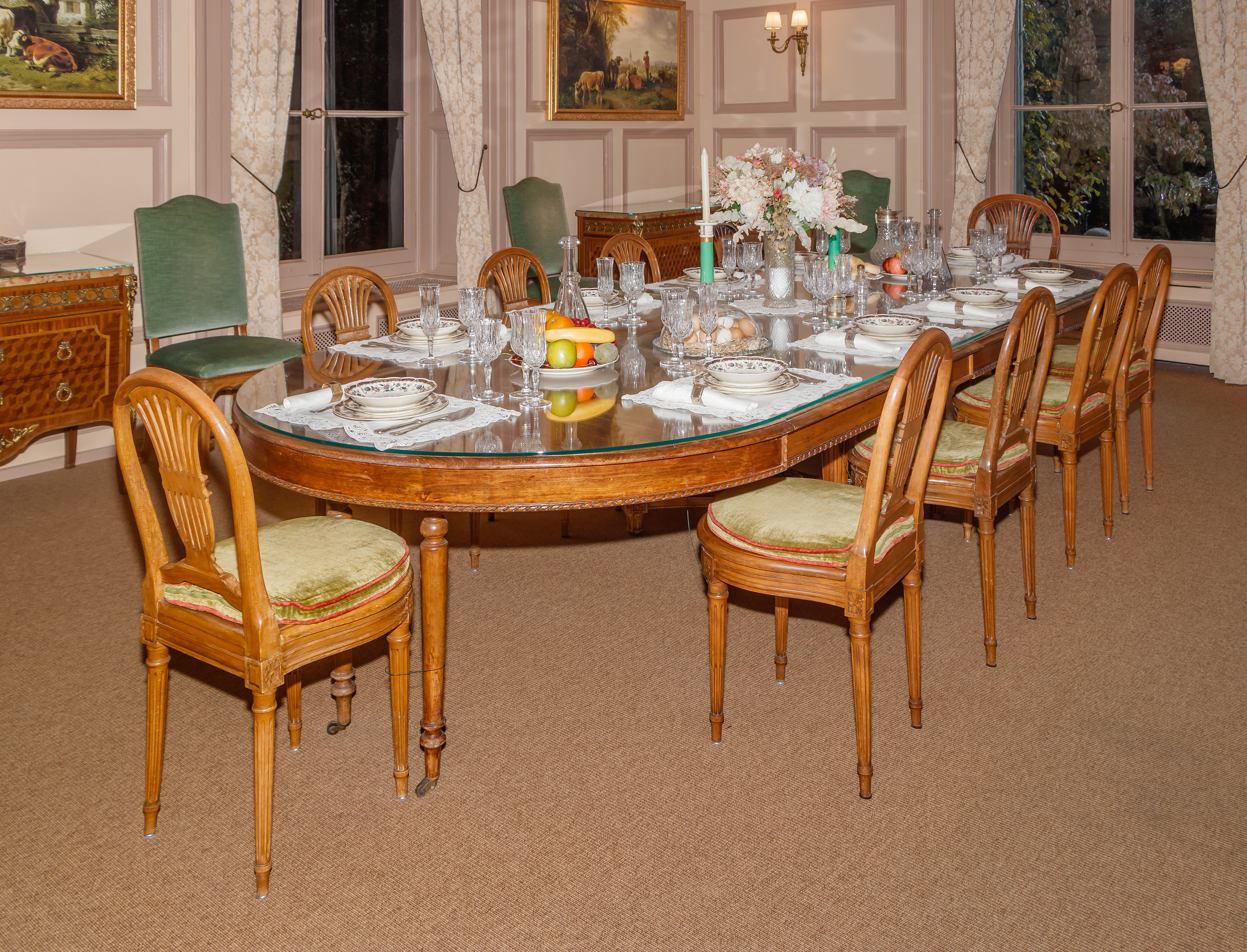
Dining room
