= Eugene Chaplin =

Swiss recording engineer (born 1953)

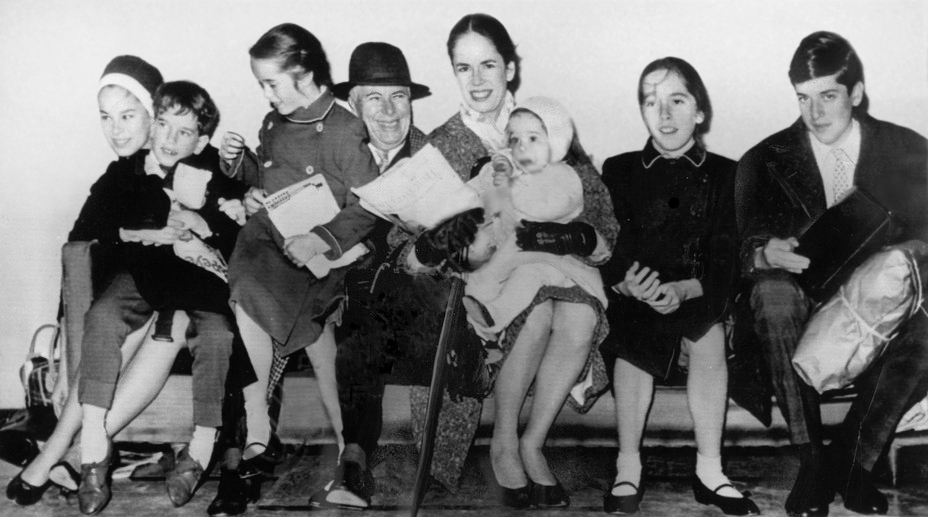
Charlie Chaplin with his wife Oona and their children (L-R) Geraldine, Eugene, Victoria, Annette, Josephine, and Michael in 1961.

Eugene Anthony Chaplin (born 23 August 1953) is a Swiss recording engineer and documentary filmmaker. He is the fifth child of Oona O'Neill and Charlie Chaplin, the grandson of playwright Eugene O'Neill, and the father of film actress Kiera Chaplin.

He was part of the cast in Benny Hill's The World's Funniest Clown (1991). He is the president of the International Comedy Film Festival of Vevey, Switzerland and also directed the documentary film Charlie Chaplin: A Family Tribute produced by Alexandre Alé de Basseville. Eugene has also created the musical Smile, which is a narration of Charlie Chaplin's life through his music.

As a recording engineer, he worked with The Rolling Stones, David Bowie, and Queen.
