= Oona O'Neill =

British actress (1925–1991)

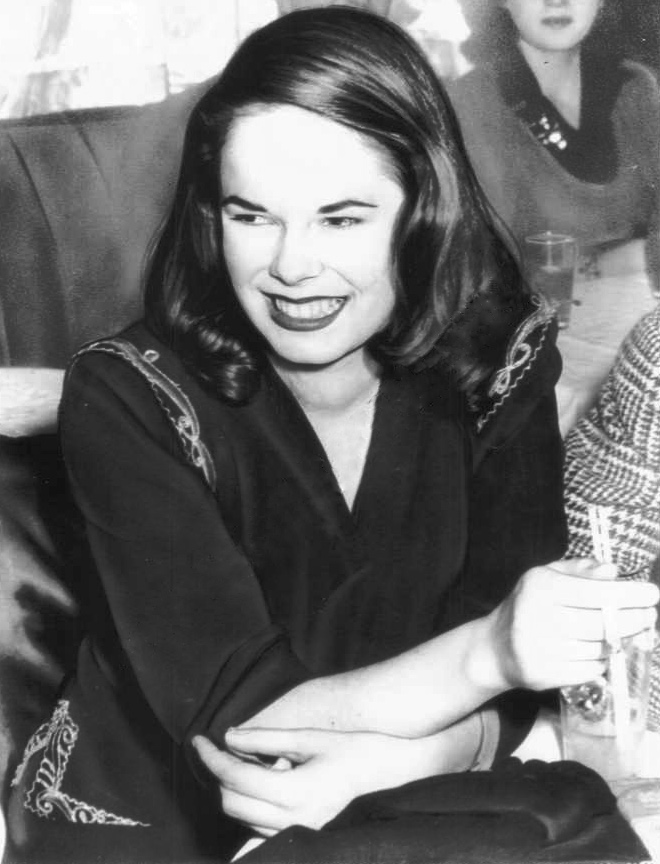
- O'Neill in Santa Barbara, California in 1943
- Born: Oona Ella O'Neill; 14 May 1925; Warwick Parish, Bermuda
- Died: 27 September 1991 (aged 66); Corsier-sur-Vevey, Switzerland
- Resting place: Cimetière de Corsier-sur-Vevey, Corsier-sur-Vevey, Switzerland
- Citizenship: United States (1925–1954); United Kingdom (1954–1991)
- Education: Brearley School
- Title: Lady Chaplin
- Spouse: Charlie Chaplin (m. 1943; died 1977)
- Children: 8, including Geraldine, Michael, Josephine, Victoria, Eugene, and Christopher
- Parents: Eugene O'Neill (father); Agnes Boulton (mother)
- Relatives: Eugene O'Neill Jr. (half-brother)

Oona O'Neill, Lady Chaplin (14 May 1925 – 27 September 1991) was a British actress, the daughter of American playwright Eugene O'Neill and English-born writer Agnes Boulton, and the fourth and last wife of actor and filmmaker Charlie Chaplin.

O'Neill's parents divorced when she was four years old, after which she was raised by her mother in Point Pleasant, New Jersey, and rarely saw her father. She first came to the public eye during her time at the Brearley School in New York City from 1940 to 1942, when she was photographed attending fashionable nightclubs with her friends Carol Marcus and Gloria Vanderbilt. In 1942, she received a large amount of media attention after she was chosen as "The Number One Debutante" of the 1942–1943 season at the Stork Club. Soon after, she decided to pursue a career in acting and, after small roles in two stage productions, headed for Hollywood, California.

In Hollywood, O'Neill was introduced to Chaplin, who considered her for a film role. The film was never made, but O'Neill and Chaplin began a romantic relationship and married in June 1943, a month after she turned 18. The 36-year age gap between them caused a scandal and severed O'Neill's relationship with her father, who was only six months older than Chaplin and who had already strongly disapproved of her wish to become an actress. Following the marriage, O'Neill gave up her career plans. She and Chaplin had eight children together and remained married until his death. The first decade of their marriage was spent living in Beverly Hills, but after Chaplin's reentry permit to the United States was cancelled during a voyage to London in 1952, they moved to Manoir de Ban in the Swiss village of Corsier-sur-Vevey. In 1954, O'Neill renounced her US citizenship and became a British citizen. Following Chaplin's death in 1977, she split her time between Switzerland and New York. She died of pancreatic cancer at the age of 66 in Corsier-sur-Vevey in 1991. Her daughter Geraldine Chaplin named her daughter after her in 1986.

== Biography ==
=== Early life (1925–1942) ===
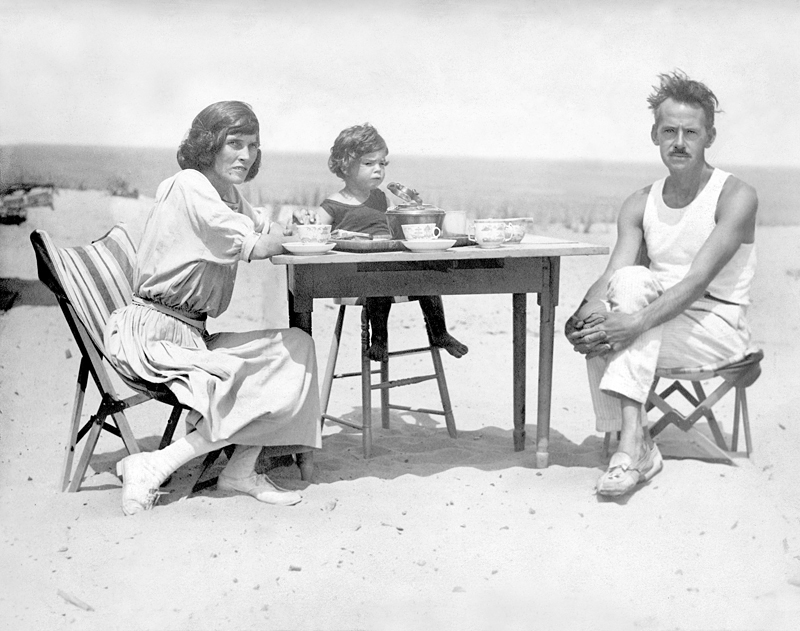
O'Neill's parents and older brother, Shane, photographed in Cape Cod in 1922, three years before her birth

Oona O'Neill was born on 14 May 1925 in the British colony of Bermuda, where her parents had relocated six months before her birth in the hopes that it would be a good place to write during the winter. She had an older brother, Shane Rudraighe O'Neill (1919–1977). Both of her parents also had children from previous relationships, Eugene O'Neill Jr. and Barbara Burton, but they did not live with the family and O'Neill saw them only occasionally during her childhood.

O'Neill's early childhood was spent between Bermuda —where the family spent winters and in 1926 purchased a house, Spithead (originally the home of privateer Hezekiah Frith)— and various places on the East Coast of the United States. (Note: These included Ridgefield, Connecticut, where the O'Neills owned a house, Nantucket, Massachusetts, Belgrade, Maine, and New York City.) Her parents' marriage had been for a long time strained by Eugene's alcoholism, and started to disintegrate after he had an affair with actress Carlotta Monterey while they were living in Belgrade, Maine, in the summer of 1926. He rekindled his romance with Monterey during a trip to New York in the early autumn of 1927, and after a brief return to Bermuda, separated from Agnes in November. Agnes and the children stayed in Bermuda until the following summer, when they moved to her parents' old house in West Point Pleasant, New Jersey. Agnes was granted a divorce in Reno, Nevada, in July 1929, and three weeks later, Eugene married Monterey in France.

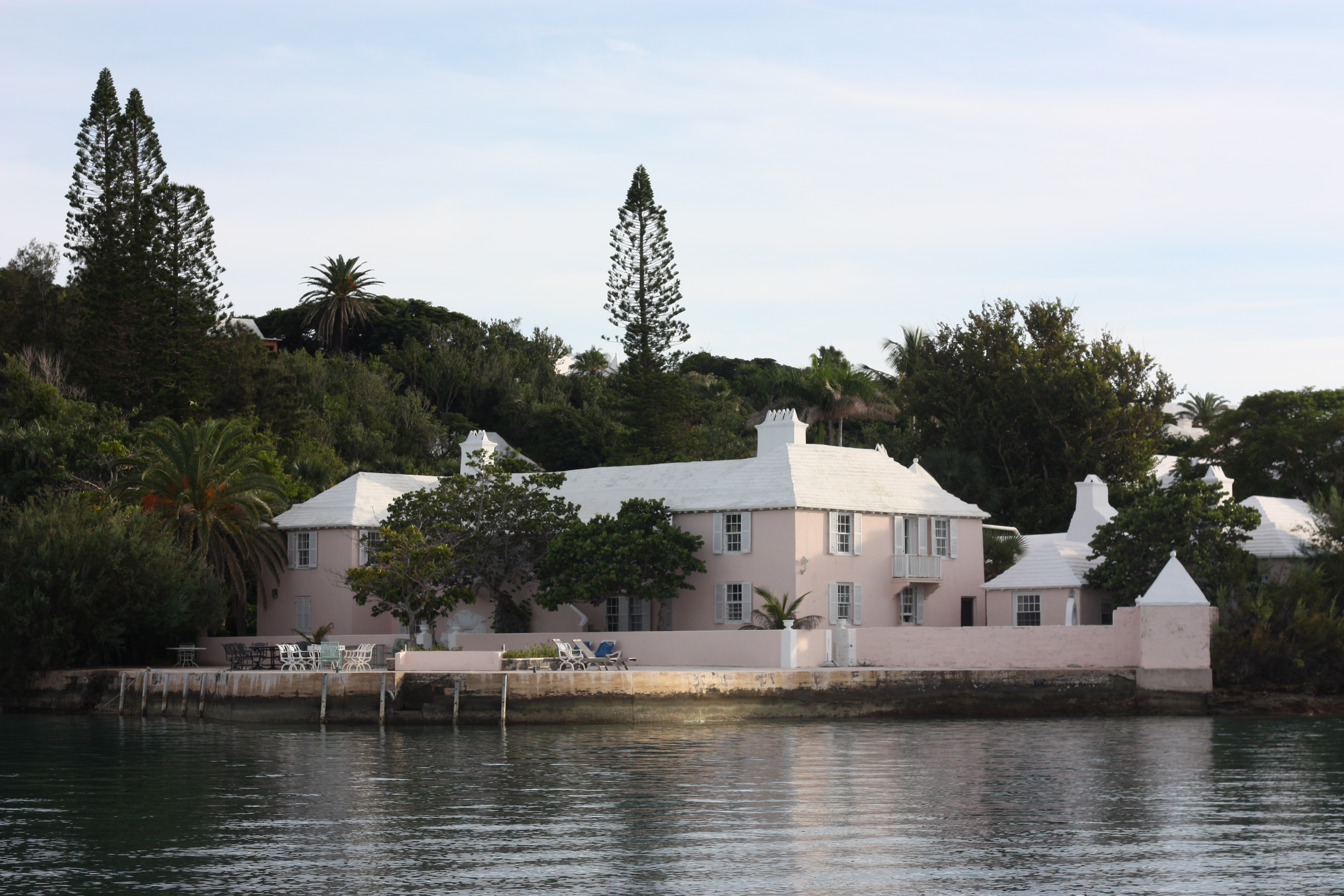
Spithead, O'Neill's childhood home in Bermuda. It was built in the 19th century by privateer Hezekiah Frith.

After the divorce, O'Neill's childhood was mostly spent living with her mother and brother in West Point Pleasant and occasionally at Spithead, in which Agnes had a lifetime interest. Although the divorce had granted joint custody, she seldom saw her father, and mainly communicated with him through letters, which were usually answered by Monterey.

O'Neill first attended a Catholic convent school, but it was deemed unsuitable for her, and she was then enrolled at the Ocean Road Public School in Point Pleasant. According to the divorce settlement, both children were to attend top boarding schools from the age of 13 and, in 1938, O'Neill was sent to study at the Warrenton Country School in Warrenton, Virginia. Agnes did not find the school satisfactory, and had her transferred to the Brearley School in New York for her sophomore year in 1940.

At Brearley, O'Neill became a close friend of Carol Marcus, and through her was introduced to Gloria Vanderbilt and Truman Capote. (Note: Capote later said that O'Neill was among the inspirations for his character Holly Golightly.) Although she was still underage, the group often spent time at popular nightclubs, and began to appear in the society pages of magazines. During this time, O'Neill dated newspaper cartoonist Peter Arno and the then-unknown author J. D. Salinger. In April 1942, during her senior year at Brearley, she was crowned as "The Number One Debutante" of the 1942–1943 season at the Stork Club. The event gained a large amount of publicity around the country, and she received offers from film studios and modeling agencies. The publicity infuriated her father, who used his contacts in the Hollywood film industry to prevent her from signing a film contract. (Note: According to Margaret Loftus Ranald, Eugene O'Neill "believed that she was exploiting his name and also that Agnes Boulton, her mother, was trying to push her into society.")

After graduating from Brearley, O'Neill declined an offer for a place to study at Vassar College and instead chose to pursue an acting career, despite her father's resistance. She made her debut in a small supporting role in a production of Pal Joey at the Maplewood Theatre in New Jersey in July 1942. The production was a flop and was cancelled after a two-week run. Later that summer, O'Neill travelled to California with Carol Marcus, who was due to marry author William Saroyan. During the trip, O'Neill briefly appeared in a production of Saroyan's play, The Time of Your Life, in San Francisco and unsuccessfully attempted to meet her father, who was living nearby.

=== Marriage to Chaplin (1943–1977) ===
From San Francisco, O'Neill headed to Los Angeles, where her mother and stepfather were living. She soon found herself a film agent, Minna Wallace, and made her first and only screentest, for Eugene Frenke's The Girl From Leningrad. In October 1942, Wallace introduced her to Charlie Chaplin, who was looking for a lead actress for his next project, an adaptation of the play Shadow and Substance. Chaplin found O'Neill beautiful but at 17, too young for the role. However, due to her and Wallace's persistence, he agreed to give O'Neill a film contract.

Shadow and Substance was shelved in December 1942, but the relationship between O'Neill and Chaplin soon developed from professional to romantic. On 16 June 1943, a month after O'Neill had turned 18, they eloped and married in a civil service in Carpinteria. The ceremony was witnessed only by Chaplin's studio secretary, Catherine Hunter, and friend and assistant, Harry Crocker. Crocker photographed the event for gossip columnist Louella Parsons, to whom Chaplin had given exclusive rights to publicize news of the marriage in the hopes that she would write a more positive article about it than her rival, Hedda Hopper, who strongly disliked him. The elopement received a large amount of media attention due to the 36-year age gap between O'Neill and Chaplin and because his ex-girlfriend, Joan Barry, had filed a paternity suit against him only two weeks earlier. Although Agnes had given the union her blessing, it cemented O'Neill's estrangement from her father, who disowned her and her issue and refused all future attempts of reconciliation. (Note: Eugene O'Neill also disowned Shane O'Neill, and as Eugene O'Neill Jr. died in 1950, his sole beneficiary at the time of his death in 1953 was his wife, Carlotta Monterey. Already in 1926, he had granted his papers to Yale University, and after his death Monterey named the institution as the receiver of royalties from all the plays which copyrights she owned. However, after Monterey's death in 1970, Oona and Shane were able to renew the copyrights to several of their father's plays, which had been copyrighted by him instead of Monterey. They became the sole owners of A Moon for the Misbegotten and A Touch of the Poet, and shared ownership to several other works with Yale.)

Following the marriage, O'Neill gave up her career plans and settled into the role of housewife. She rarely spoke in public, but in 1952 she commented that she was "happy to stay in the background" and help Chaplin where needed. They spent the first nine years of their marriage living in Beverly Hills and had the first four of their eight children, Geraldine Leigh (b. July 1944), Michael John (b. March 1946), Josephine Hannah (b. March 1949) and Victoria Agnes (b. May 1951), during this time. Although she focused on her home and children, O'Neill also spent time at the studios if Chaplin was working. He often consulted O'Neill for her opinion. She also acted as a stand-in for lead actress Claire Bloom in Limelight (1952), when a scene had to be reshot after filming had wrapped, and Bloom was already working on another project.

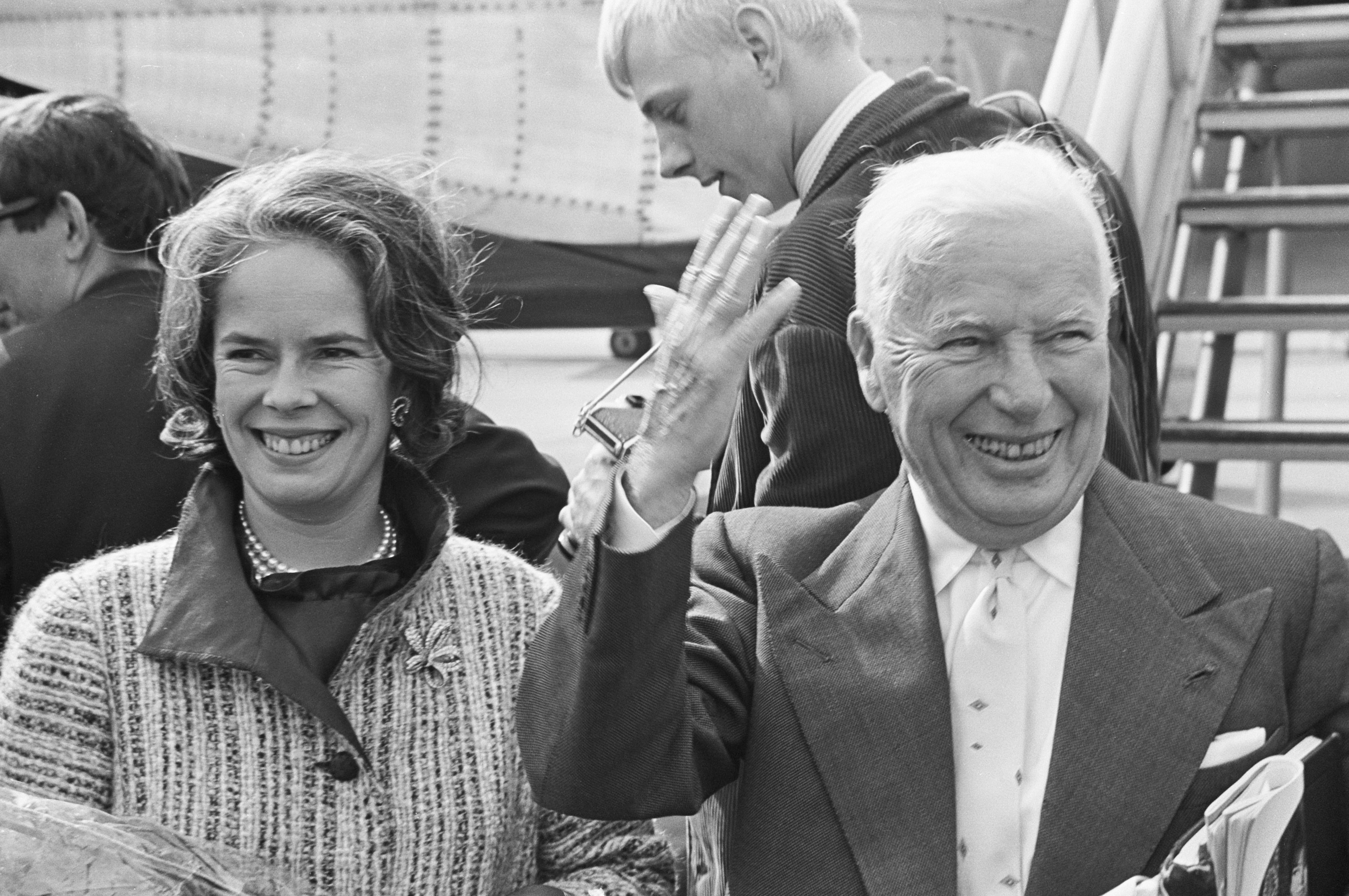
O'Neill and Chaplin at Amsterdam Airport Schiphol, Netherlands, 1965

The 1940s and 1950s were a difficult time for Chaplin in the United States, where he was accused of communist sympathies and was investigated by the FBI. In September 1952, while travelling with O'Neill and their children to London for the premiere of Limelight on board the ocean liner Queen Elizabeth, his re-entry permit was revoked. The family soon decided to move permanently to Europe, and in November 1952, O'Neill flew back to the US to transfer Chaplin's assets to European bank accounts and to close up their house and the studio. In early January 1953, they moved to their new home, Manoir de Ban, a 14-hectare (35-acre) estate in the rural village of Corsier-sur-Vevey in Switzerland. The following year, O'Neill renounced her American citizenship, and became a British citizen.

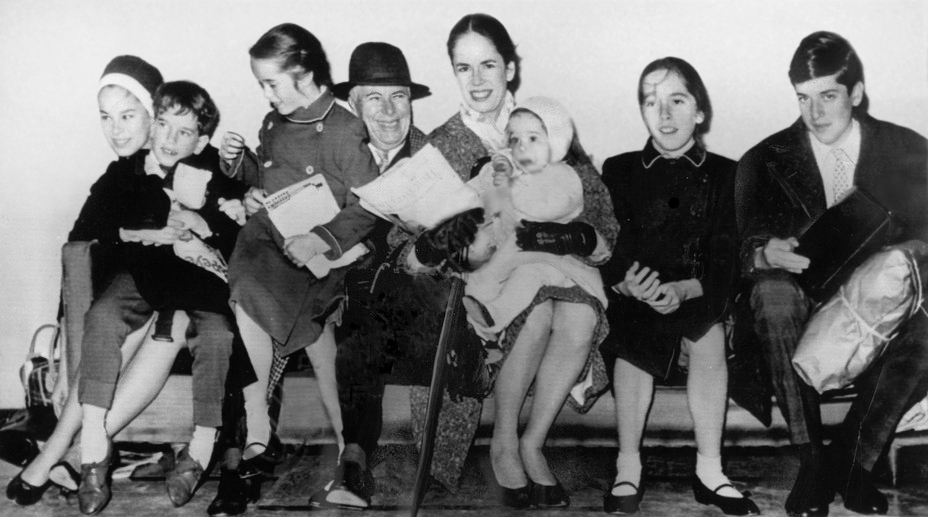
The Chaplins and six of their eight children (Jane and Christopher are absent) in 1961. From left to right: Geraldine, Eugene, Victoria, Charlie Chaplin, O'Neill, Annette, Josephine, and Michael

While living in Switzerland, the Chaplins added four more children to their family: Eugene Anthony (b. August 1953), Jane Cecil (b. May 1957), Annette Emily (b. December 1959), and Christopher James (b. July 1962). When Chaplin's health gradually started to fail in the late 1960s, he became increasingly dependent on Oona's support. He died of a stroke at the age of 88 on 25 December 1977, and was buried two days later.

In March 1978, O'Neill became the victim of an extortion plot. Chaplin's coffin was stolen from his grave by two unemployed mechanics, Roman Wardas and Gantcho Ganev, who unsuccessfully demanded a ransom from O'Neill in exchange for the body. The pair were caught in a large police operation two months later, and Chaplin's unopened coffin was reinterred, having been found buried in a field in the nearby village of Noville.

=== Later life and death (1978–1991) ===
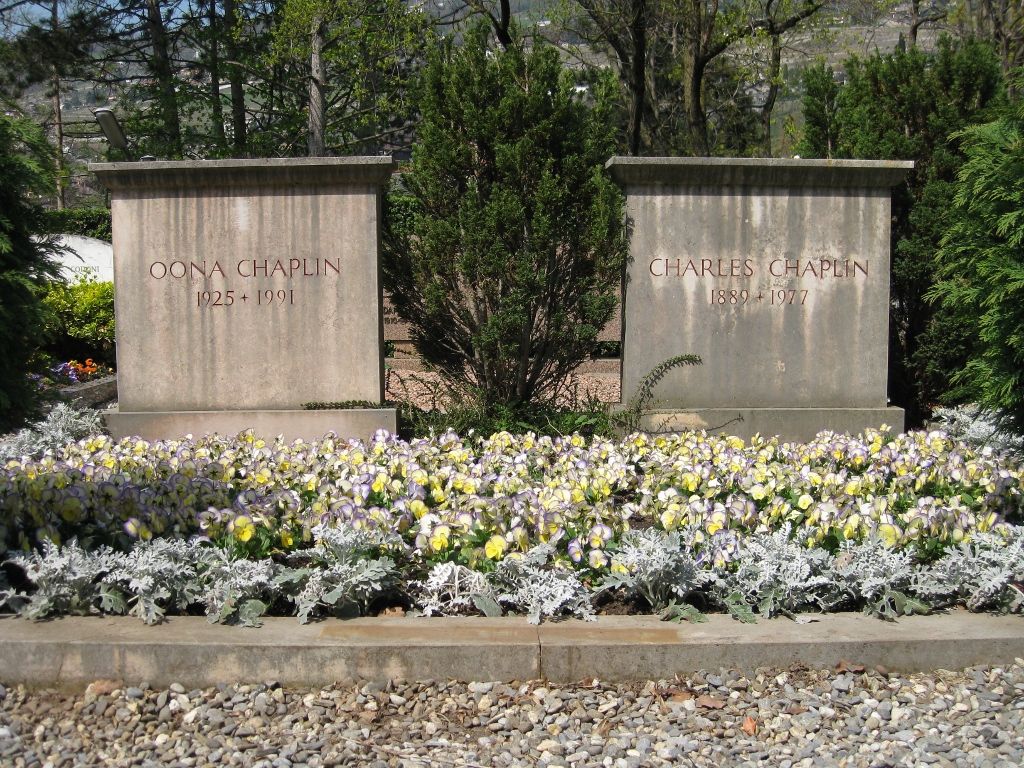
Charles and Oona Chaplin's graves in Corsier-sur-Vevey

Following Chaplin's death, O'Neill divided her time between Switzerland and New York. She appeared in the supporting role of an alcoholic mother in the film Broken English (1981) as a favor to the film's producer, Bert Schneider, but otherwise avoided publicity. According to unofficial biographer Jane Scovell and ex-daughter-in-law Patrice Chaplin, O'Neill was an alcoholic and became almost a recluse after returning permanently to Manoir de Ban in the late 1980s. She died on 27 September 1991 at the age of 66 of pancreatic cancer in Corsier-sur-Vevey, and was buried next to her husband in the village cemetery. In her last will, O'Neill, who was a prolific writer of diaries and letters during her life, ordered that all her writings be destroyed, and never published.

== In popular culture ==
In film, O'Neill has been portrayed by Moira Kelly in Richard Attenborough's biographical film of Charlie Chaplin's life, Chaplin (1992), and by Zoey Deutch in the film Rebel in the Rye (2017), based on the young life of J. D. Salinger.

Onstage, she has been portrayed by Ashley Brown in Limelight: The Story of Charlie Chaplin at the La Jolla Playhouse in San Diego in 2010 and by Erin Mackey in the production's Broadway version, Chaplin – The Musical, in 2012.

Frédéric Beigbeder's 2014 novel Manhattan's Babe is loosely based on her short romance with Salinger in the 1940s.

Tamatha Cain's 2023 novel Only Oona is a dramatized account of her early life as the daughter of Eugene O'Neill, her friendships with Carol Grace, Gloria Vanderbilt, and Truman Capote, and her marriage to Charlie Chaplin.

== Sources ==
- Bowen, Croswell (1959). The Curse of the Misbegotten – A Tale of the House of O'Neill. London: McGraw & Hill. Archived from the original on 11 May 2018.
- Clarke, Gerald (1988). Capote: A Biography (1st ed.). New York: Simon and Schuster. ISBN 978-0-241-12549-6.
- Lynn, Kenneth S. (1997). Charlie Chaplin and His Times. New York, NY: Simon & Schuster. ISBN 0-684-80851-X.
- Maland, Charles J. (1989). Chaplin and American Culture. Princeton, NJ: Princeton University Press. ISBN 0-691-02860-5.
- Ranald, Margaret Loftus (1985). The Eugene O'Neill Companion. Westport, Connecticut and London, England: Greenwood Press. ISBN 0-313-22551-6.
- Robinson, David (1986). Chaplin: His Life and Art. London: Paladin. ISBN 0-586-08544-0.
- Scovell, Jane (1999). Oona – Living in the Shadows: A Biography of Oona O'Neill Chaplin. New York: Grand Central Publishing. ISBN 0-446-67541-5.
- Sheaffer, Louis (1973). O'Neill: Son and Artist. Boston and Toronto: Little, Brown & Company. ISBN 0-316-78336-6.
