= Bermuda Union of Teachers =

Education workers union in Bermuda

- Education for Responsibility
- Abbreviation: BUT
- Established: 1919; 107 years ago
- Founders: Edith Crawford, Matilda Crawford, Rufus Stovell, & Adele Tucker
- Merger of: Teachers' Association of Bermuda
- Type: Trade union
- Headquarters: 72 Teachers Place; 72 Church Street; Hamilton HM12
- Fields: Education
- Members: 900 (2004)
- Secretary General: Dante Cooper
- President: Jonathan Tankard
- Vice President: Crenstant Williams
- Recording Secretary: Jutkita Wilson
- Treasurer: Maxine Webb
- Website: www.but.bm
- Formerly called: Amalgamated Bermuda Union of Teachers

The Bermuda Union of Teachers (BUT) is a trade union representing education workers in Bermuda.

The union was founded in 1919, the first to be established in the country. Its founders were Edith Crawford, Matilda Crawford, Rufus Stovell and Adele Tucker, who were inspired by the deaths of several colleagues who were struggling financially.

Trade unions were not officially legalised in Bermuda until 1946, and the BUT was the first to register with the government. In 1964, the union absorbed the Teachers' Association of Bermuda, which represented white teachers. As a result, the union renamed itself as the Amalgamated Bermuda Union of Teachers, but returned to its original name in 1997.
