= Liliane de Kermadec =

French film director (1928–2020)

- Born: 6 October 1928
- Died: 13 February 2020 (aged 91)
- Occupations: Film director Screenwriter
- Years active: 1965-2016

Liliane de Kermadec (French: [liljan də kɛʁmadɛk]; 6 October 1928 – 13 February 2020) was a Polish-French film director and screenwriter. She directed more than twenty films and documentaries between 1965 and 2016.

== Career ==
Liliane de Kermadec began as a set photographer, working with Agnes Varda on Cléo from 5 to 7, Alain Resnais on Muriel, and Yves Robert on Berbert and the Train.

Liliane de Kermadec's first two feature films, Home Sweet Home (1972) and Aloïse (1975), were both screened at Cannes Film Festival.

Tim Palmer published an article, "Enraged to Live: Reviving Liliane de Kermadec’s Aloïse," on de Kermadec's often obscured legacy, in the context of women's authorship and interventionist subtitling, in French Screen Studies.

== Filmography ==
- Le Murmure des ruines (2008)
- La Très chère indépendance du Haut Karabagh (2005)
- La Piste du télégraphe (1994)
- Un moment d'inattention (1986)
- Mersonne ne m'aime (1982)
- Le Petit Pommier (1981)
- Aloïse (1975)
- Home Sweet Home (1972)
- Qui donc a rêvé? (1965)
- Le Temps d'Emma (1964)
