= Tim Palmer (film historian) =

English film historian

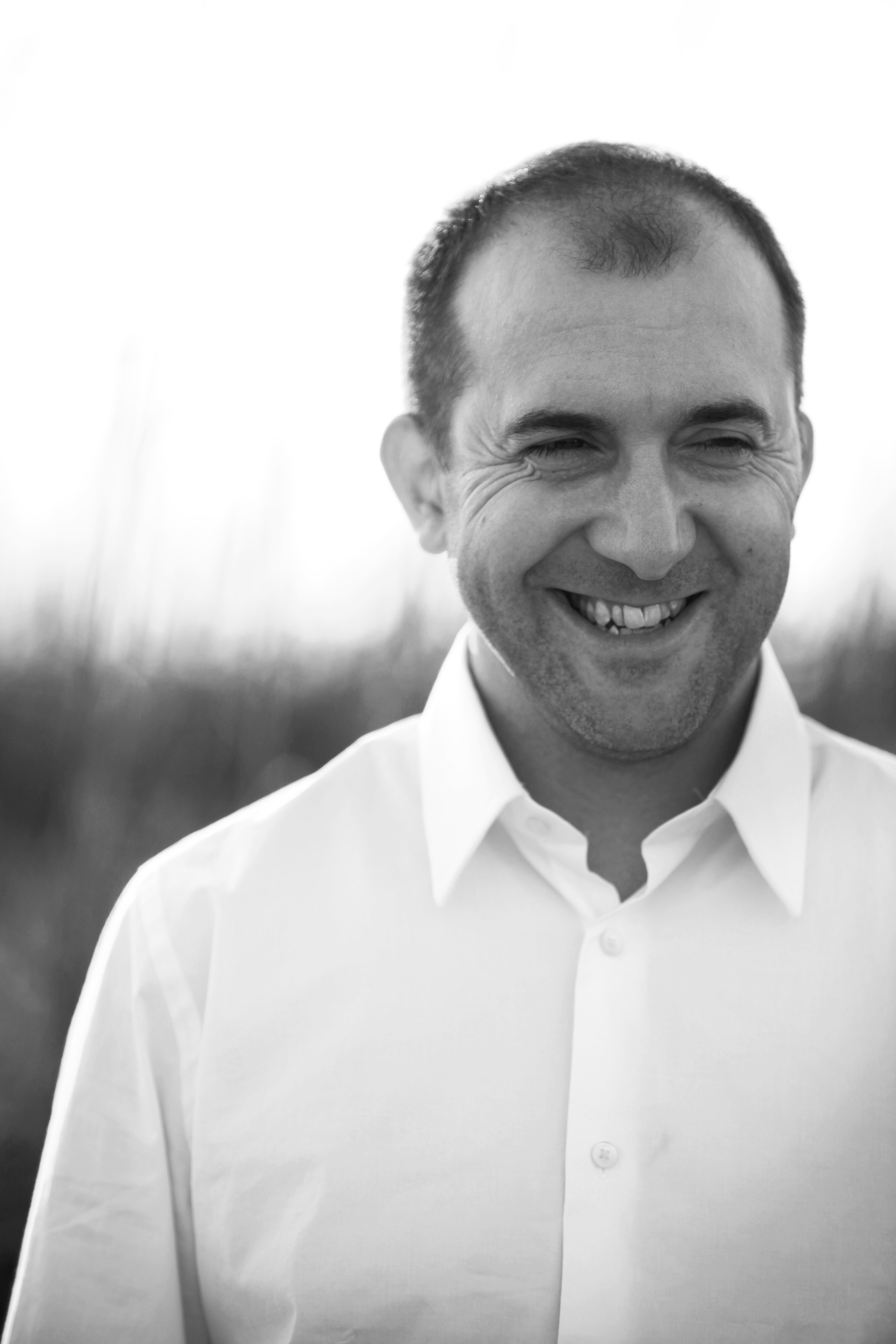
- Tim Palmer in 2010
- Born: Timothy Neil Palmer; 8 August 1975 (age 51); Nottingham, England
- Citizenship: United Kingdom; United States
- Education: University of Warwick; University of Wisconsin–Madison
- Occupations: Professor and historian of French and Japanese film; University department chair; Co-editor-in-chief of Film Matters
- Years active: 2003–present
- Employer: University of Utah
- Spouse: Liza Palmer (m. 2000)
- Children: 1

Tim Palmer is a British film historian, born in Nottingham, England, and currently based at the University of Utah in the Film & Media Arts department. He holds a bachelor's degree (with honors) in film and literature from the University of Warwick, a master's degree in film and television studies from the University of Warwick, and a PhD in communication arts (film track) from the University of Wisconsin–Madison.

His primary research areas include contemporary French cinema and women in the French film industry. His first monograph, Brutal Intimacy: Analyzing Contemporary French Cinema (Wesleyan University Press, 2011), introduced the idea of the contemporary French film industry as an ecosystem, considering how it intersects with le jeune cinéma français, first-time directors, cinéma du corps (a more materials-based interrogation of the New French Extremity), pop-art cinema, female authorship, cinephilia, and La Fémis. His second monograph, Irreversible (Palgrave Macmillan, 2015), is a textual and formal analysis of Gaspar Noé's infamous 2002 rape and revenge film Irréversible.

He has also published articles and co-edited (with Charlie Michael) a volume on French cinema, Directory of World Cinema: France (University of Chicago Press/Intellect, 2013), exploring such topics as: Paule Delsol, Liliane de Kermadec, Marina de Van, Valérie Donzelli, Jean-Paul Civeyrac, Jean-Pierre Melville, Mia Hansen-Løve, Philippe Grandrieux, Claire Denis, Valeria Bruni Tedeschi, La France, Jean Dujardin, Bruno Dumont, Water Lilies, Catherine Breillat, Marjane Satrapi, and Céline Sciamma.

Palmer is founding co-editor-in-chief of the journal Film Matters—written and peer-reviewed by undergraduate students—which has been profiled nationally by The Chronicle of Higher Education and the podcast Aca-Media, as well as various local publications.

He has been consulted by the Los Angeles Times for articles on Frank Capra Jr. and Catherine Deneuve, and has been interviewed by The Chronicle of Higher Education, Film International, Film Matters, as well as WHQR and the University of North Carolina Wilmington (UNCW).

His work has been supported by the National Endowment for the Humanities and the American Council of Learned Societies.

Starting in 2023, Palmer served as chair of the film studies department at his previous employer, the UNCW; while in post there, he was recognized as a "top player" in Wilmington's film industry.

In 2025, Palmer relocated to the University of Utah as professor and chair of the Film & Media Arts department.

In October 2026, Palmer was elected as a Fellow of the International Institute of Film Science & Arts for his services to French cinema and film education.

== Publications ==
=== Books ===
- Palmer, Tim (forthcoming). Cinema Marianne: A New History of Women and Marginality in the French Film Ecosystem. Edinburgh: Edinburgh University Press.
- Palmer, Tim (2014). Irreversible. London: Red Globe Press. ISBN 9780230336971.
- Palmer, Tim; Charlie Michael, eds. (2013). Directory of World Cinema: France. Bristol: Intellect. ISBN 9781841505633.
- Palmer, Tim (2011). Brutal Intimacy: Analyzing Contemporary French Cinema. Middletown: Wesleyan University Press. ISBN 9780819568274.

=== Select articles ===
- "Enraged to Live: Reviving Liliane de Kermadec’s Aloïse,” French Screen Studies 25.3 (2025), pp. 199–219
- "Sun and Shadow: Musidora’s Self-Curated Stardom in Periodicals and the Archive," Journal of Modern Periodical Studies 14:2 (2024), pp. 252–273
- "Entropic Creativity: Agnès Varda’s Early Publications and France’s Postwar Film Ecosystem," MAI: Feminism and Visual Culture 12 (November 2023)
- "Beside Du côté de la côte: Agnès Varda’s Early Applied Cinephilia," Short Film Studies 12:1 (2022), pp. 81–95
- "De Natura: The Child-Centric Cinema of Lucile Hadžihalilović," Senses of Cinema (2022)
- "The French New Wave: Insurrection Generation," Bloomsbury Screen Studies (2022)
- "Frontier Poetry: New Adventures in Contemporary French Horror Cinema," Modern & Contemporary France 30:1 (2022), pp. 1–17
- "Outside In: Lucile Hadžihalilović and Gaspar Noé’s Les Cinémas de la Zone," Senses of Cinema (2022)
- "Remembrance of Things to Come: Nicole Vedrès, Paris 1900, and the Postwar French Essay Film," French Screen Studies 21.2 (2021), pp. 123–145
- "Horrible Histories of Cinema: Parisian Archival Encounters at the Fondation Jérôme Seydoux-Pathé," The Moving Image 18.2 (2019), pp. 155–167
- "In Bed with Contemporary French Cinema: Justine Triet’s Victoria," Filmatique (2018)
- "Memories of Media: An Interview with Carine Tardieu," The Moving Image 17.1 (2018), pp. 142–150
- "Drift: Paula Delsol Inside and Outside the French New Wave," Studies in French Cinema 17:2 (2017), pp. 144–164
- "Valérie Donzelli’s La Guerre est declarée: War and Peace in the Contemporary French Cinema Ecosystem," Modern & Contemporary France 25:1 (2017), pp. 31–47
- "Guilty Pleasures/Innocent Pleasures: Porous Texts and Utopian Entertainment," In Media Res (December 2016)
- "Irreversible: The Climactic Sequence’s Flight to Abstract Rapture," In Media Res (April–May 2014)
- "Rites of Passing: Conceptual Nihilism in Jean Paul Civeyrac’s Des filles en noir," Cinephile 8.2 (2013), pp. 8–15
- "Melodramas of the Everyday: An Interview with Julie Lopes-Curval," The French Review 86:3 (2013), pp. 94–104
- "Crashing the Millionaires’ Club: Popular Women’s Cinema in Twenty-First Century France," Studies in French Cinema 12:3 (2012), pp. 201–214
- "Don’t Look Back: An Interview with Marina de Van," The French Review 83:5 (2010), pp. 96–103
- "Contemporary French Feminine Cinema and Lucile Hadzihalilovic’s Innocence," The French Review 83:2 (2009), pp. 38–49
- "Les Enfants terribles: An Interview with Françoise Marie," Film International 34 (2008), pp. 94–98
- "Paris, City of Shadows: French Crime Cinema Before the New Wave," New Review of Film and Television Studies 6:2 (2008), pp. 113–131
- "An Amateur of Quality: Postwar French Cinema and Jean-Pierre Melville’s Le Silence de la mer,” Journal of Film and Video 59:4 (2007), pp. 3–19
- "Under Your Skin: Marina de Van and the Contemporary French Cinéma du corps,” Studies in French Cinema 6:3 (2006), pp. 171–181
- "Style and Sensation in the Contemporary French Cinema of the Body," Journal of Film and Video 58:3 (2006), pp. 22–32
- "Side of the Angels: Dalton Trumbo, the Hollywood Trade Press, and the Blacklist," Cinema Journal 44:4 (2005), pp. 57–74
- "Jean-Pierre Melville and 1970s French Film Style," Studies in French Cinema 2:3 (2003), pp. 135–145

=== Select book chapters ===
- "Marginal/Minimal: Robert Bresson, Céline Sciamma, and Applied Cinephilia," Coming to Terms with Robert Bresson, Jonathan Hourigan, ed. (forthcoming Manchester University Press, 2026)
- "In Constant Struggle: Early Formulation of Isabelle Adjani in Faustine et le bel été," Isabelle Adjani, Romain Chareyron, ed. (forthcoming Edinburgh University Press, 2026)
- "Wave to Tsunami: Paule Delsol and the End of the Nouvelle Vague," The Other French New Wave: Forgotten Directors, Charlie Michael and R. Barton Palmer, eds. (forthcoming Edinburgh University Press, 2026)
- "In Search of Lost Time: Memory and Recall in French Cinema of the Fourth Republic (1946–1958)," Memory and Nostalgia in World Cinema, Nancy Membrez, ed. (McFarland, 2019), pp. 5–29
- "Fine Arts and Ugly Arts: Blue is the Warmest Color, Abdellatif Kechiche’s Corporeal State of the Nation," Sex and Excess on Film: Intercourse in Television, Documentary, Queer Cinema, Arthouse, Lindsay Coleman and Carol Siegel, eds. (Lexington Press, 2018), pp. 3–23
- "The Joy of Burglary: Wealth Relocation Strategies for the Upwardly Mobile in the Postwar French Policier," Best Laid Plans: Interrogating the Heist Film, James Leach and Jeanette Stonioski, eds. (Wayne State University Press, 2017), pp. 47–63
- "Modes of Masculinity in Contemporary French Cinema," A Companion to Contemporary French Film, Hilary Radner, Raphaëlle Moine and Alistair Fox, eds. (Wiley-Blackwell, 2015), pp. 419–438
- "An Interview with François Truffart, Director of the City of Lights, City of Angels Film Festival," Directory of World Cinema: France, Tim Palmer and Charlie Michael, eds. (University of Chicago Press/Intellect, 2013)
- "Women’s Filmmaking in France," Directory of World Cinema: France, Tim Palmer and Charlie Michael, eds. (University of Chicago Press/Intellect, 2013)
- "Le Cercle rouge: Jean-Pierre Melville entre cinéma d’auteur et cinéma populaire," Le Cercle rouge: Lectures croisées, Marguerite Chabrol and Alain Kleinberger, eds. (L’Harmattan, 2011)
- "The Rules of the World: Japanese Eco-Cinema and Kiyoshi Kurosawa," Framing the World: Explorations in Ecocriticism and Film, Paula Willoquet-Maricondi, ed. (University of Virginia Press, 2010)
- "Star, Interrupted: The Reinvention of James Stewart," Film and Television Stardom, Kylo-Patrick Hart, ed. (Cambridge Scholars Publishing, 2008), pp. 43–57
- "Threading the Eye of the Needle: Contemporary Pop-Art French Cinema and Valeria Bruni-Tedeschi’s Il est plus facile pour un chameau...," France at the Flicks: Trends in Contemporary French Popular Cinema, Isabelle Vanderschelden and Darren Waldron, eds. (Cambridge Scholars Publishing, 2007), pp. 89–102
- "Jean-Pierre Melville’s Le Samouraï," The Cinema of France, Phil Powrie, ed. (Wallflower Press, 2006), pp. 122–131
- "From Extra to Everyman: The Expressive Dialectic of Director and Actor in the Films of James Stewart and Frank Capra," The Visible Man: Film Acting From Early Cinema To The Threshold Of Modern Cinema, Laura Vichi, ed. (University of Udine Press, 2002), pp. 179–187
