= Jane Scovell =

American author and journalist

- Born: Brockton, Massachusetts, U.S.
- Occupations: Author; journalist; playwright
- Children: 3
- Writing career
- Years active: 1968-present
- Website: www.janescovell.com

Jane Scovell (born in Brockton, Massachusetts) is an American author, journalist and playwright.

She is the author of collaborative autobiographies with Marilyn Horne, Elizabeth Taylor, Kitty Dukakis, Ginger Rogers, Cheryl Landon Wilson (Michael Landon), Maureen Stapleton, Kathy Levine, Petra Nemcova and Tim Conway. She has also written biographies of Oona O’Neill Chaplin and Samuel Ramey.
