= Raquel Alessi =

American actress and model

- Born: Raquel Nazzarena Alessi; March 7, 1983 (age 43); Los Angeles, California, U.S.
- Occupations: Actress, model
- Years active: 1989–2015

Raquel Nazzarena Alessi (born March 7, 1983) is an American retired actress and model who starred on the FOX series Standoff. She portrays the title character in the 2009 film Miss March, alongside Zach Cregger and Trevor Moore from the comedy troupe The Whitest Kids U' Know.

== Life and career ==
Alessi was born in Los Angeles, California. She attended Marymount High School in Los Angeles, and later moved on to develop her acting talents at New York University, where she studied theater performance. While at the college she appeared in several plays including King Lear and Uncle Vanya. After attending college, Alessi landed a small role in Carlito's Way: Rise to Power.

In 2007, she was cast in a featured role in the Marvel Comic's superhero film Ghost Rider. Alessi was cast as the younger version of the character Roxanne Simpson, which would be played later in the movie by Eva Mendes. She is widely recognized for her role as Lia Mathers in the FOX television show Standoff. She was also named to Maxim's Hot 100 where she was voted #88 in 2007.

== Filmography ==
Actress

- Castle .... Selena Rigas (1 episode, 2013)
- How I Met Your Mother .... Roberta (1 episode, 2009)
- CSI: NY .... Brooke Hallworth (1 episode, 2009)
- Miss March (2009) .... Cindi Whitehall
- Summerhood (2008) .... Cinnamon
- Standoff .... Lia Mathers (18 episodes, 2006–2007)
- Ghost Rider (2007) .... Young Roxanne Simpson
- Carlito's Way: Rise to Power (2005) (V) .... Rocco's Date
- Uncle Sam (1996) (as Raquel Allessi) .... Girl Student
- Lucky Chances (1990) TV mini-series .... Maria - Age 6

Miscellaneous Crew

- Dig It! (2011) (production assistant)

Self

- Kidsongs .... Herself (Kidsongs Kid) (2 VHS episodes (where she appeared with Terrance Williams (former dancer)) (born 1979) "A Day At Camp" (1989) (where she appeared with Amaris "Ingrid" Dupree (former dancer) and Josh Keaton) and "Ride the Roller Coaster" (1990) (where she appeared with Josh Keaton and Kenny Ford, Jr. (former keytarist/singer) (born 1977))
- Up Close with Carrie Keagan .... Herself (2 episodes, 2009)
