= List of The Whitest Kids U' Know episodes =

The following is a list of episodes from the sketch comedy group The Whitest Kids U' Know which ran for 5 seasons from March 20, 2007 to June 17, 2011 on Fuse. It had a total of 60 episodes. Based on counting the number of skits in this article, the series contained 385 sketches.

== Series overview ==
Season	Episodes	Originally released	
Season	Episodes	First released	Last released
1	10	March 20, 2007	May 22, 2007
2	10	February 10, 2008	April 13, 2008
3	20	January 27, 2009	June 2, 2009
4	10	June 10, 2010	August 13, 2010
5	10	April 15, 2011	June 17, 2011

== Season 1 (2007) ==
No. overall	No. in season	Title	Directed by	Written by	Original release date
1	1	"WKUK Ep. 01"	Zach Cregger & Trevor Moore	Trevor Moore (Head Writer), Sam Brown, Zach Cregger, Darren Trumeter & Timmy Williams	March 20, 2007
1. iPod Shuffle - Anne mistakes Paul's (Trevor) iPod Shuffle for a pregnancy test.; 2. Hitler Rap - Adolf Hitler (Trevor) stars in a rap video, "Triumph of the Ill".; 3. Timmy Poop - At a boardroom meeting, Timmy defecates in his own pants and throws his own feces in the trash. An argument escalates as the other boardroom members find it infuriatingly gross.; 4. Alcoholics Anonymous - Blackout: A drunkard misunderstands the purpose of an AA meeting.; 5. Abe Lincoln - At Ford's Theatre, during a bizarre production of Hamlet involving vampires, heckler Abe Lincoln (Zach) agitates audience member John Wilkes Booth (Trevor), which leads him to run up to Lincoln's booth with a hammer and hammer him in the ass to death.; 6. Pizza Bagels - When his wife serves him Mama John's Pizza Bagels for breakfast, Sam becomes infuriated, insisting - "PIZZA'S NOT FOR BREAKFAST!" then violently beats his wife offscreen with his belt.; 7. Sexy Fawn - In the forest, a fawn (Darren) seduces hunters (Zach, Sam, Trevor), until the ranger (Timmy) gets involved.; 8. Slapping - Slapping people in the face , a kick in the balls and shirt wedgies are "the new thing" among friends.; 9. Get a New Daddy - Guitarist Trevor tells children in song how to get a new father - by framing their actual father as a pedophile to get them arrested.
2	2	"WKUK Ep. 02"	Trevor Moore	Trevor Moore (Head Writer), Sam Brown, Zach Cregger, Darren Trumeter & Timmy Williams	March 20, 2007
1. Rock n Roll Indiana Jones - Blackout: Indiana Jones (Trevor) protests against the auctioning of Peter Frampton's guitar.; 2. Let's Wake Up the Neighbors - WKUK star in a reggaeton video about disturbing the peace.; 3. Movie Pitching Guy - Enthusiastic mail worker Scott (Trevor) tries to quickly pitch movie ideas to the studio heads (Zach, Sam, Darren), and soon gets them all psyched.; 4. Abdell Drums - (Timmy)'s parents (Zach, Sam) are upset that he bought an African djembe drummer (really a weed salesman).; 5. Polite War - During the Revolutionary War, the redcoats practice addressing the American army politely.; 6. Burglar - Blackout: Burglar's (Timmy) lawyer (Darren) doesn't like his outfit.; 7. Whip Boy - Annoying superhero Whip Boy (Trevor) answers to the call of action.; 8. Brothers in Arms - A trailer for a war movie in which three brothers get in a brawl.; 9. Classroom - In kindergarten class, the teacher (Darren) plays a guessing game about the sudden death of one child's mother in a car accident, resulting in a traumatic experience for the child, Joey (Timmy), which ends with poor Joey running out of the classroom in tears. The teacher actually lied, saying she hated Joey, and that it was actually Scotty (Trevor) whose mother died. Upon hearing this, Scotty celebrates around town, doing whatever he wants, because his parents are dead. Following this segment, Trevor demonstrates the special effect used towards the end of the sketch where footage of him in front of a blue screen was added to footage of a black person.
3	3	"WKUK Ep. 03"	Zach Cregger	Trevor Moore (Head Writer), Sam Brown, Zach Cregger, Darren Trumeter & Timmy Williams	March 27, 2007
1. Peeing - (Zach) suffers embarrassment at the office.; 2. Cubicle Guy - In the workplace, boss (Sam) bothers employee (Darren) with annoying questions. They draw what they did last night.; 3. Pimp Pun Disaster - At the hospital, a nurse (Darren) tells a pimp (Trevor) about the status of his whore. The pimp can’t help making several "whore" puns.; 4. Whiskey - Trevor attempts to make his own "Super Size Me" documentary of himself consuming only whiskey. (note: several WKUK sketch titles are written on the wall in one shot); 5. Time Travel Farmer - Two kids (Darren & Trevor) decide to have fun with a time machine and a farmer (Sam).; 6. Astronaut Mess - Barry (Trevor) shows up at the Space Shuttle late, and bothers (Timmy) and (Darren) by spilling foodstuffs on them.; 7. Trevor Talks to the Kids - Trevor visits a second grade class and talks to the kids about conspiracy theories concerning President Bush.
4	4	"WKUK Ep. 04"	Trevor Moore	Trevor Moore (Head Writer), Sam Brown, Zach Cregger, Darren Trumeter & Timmy Williams	April 3, 2007
1. Scarin’ Babies - Trevor attempts to scare a baby by warning it of its future college tuition and global warming. When that doesn’t work, he manages to succeed by screaming loudly.; 2. Saturday - Man-child David (Trevor) sees Saturday as a day to run amok and shoot his bow and arrow.; 3. Did You Used to Date? - (Timmy) is out to assault everyone who dated his girlfriend in high school. Trevor and Timmy attempt to boost WKUK DVD sales by bringing in a woman who takes off her top.; 4. Europeans - A re-enactment of the interaction between Europeans and Indians in 1620 makes the Indians look like jerks.; 5. Crying - At a restaurant, Zach tells his girlfriend (Darren) that he has a brain tumor. They cry, until the waiter (Trevor) arrives and announces the specials, one of which is the clam chowder that gets rid of brain tumors.; 6. White Castle - Blackout: Zach tells Trevor about the time he ate at White Castle.; 7. Europeans 2 - A re-enactment of the interaction between Europeans and Africans in 1769 makes the Africans look like jerks.; 8. Opposite Day Lawyer - In a courtroom, Mr. Lawyerstein (Trevor) informs the jury that Opposite Day has just begun, and gets into a battle of wits with the prosecutor (Zach). The sketch ends with another topless plug for WKUK on DVD.; 9. Funeral Request - Blackout: Zach makes a funeral request to Trevor.; 10. Europeans 3 - An enactment of the interaction between Europeans and Martians in 3024 predicts that the Martians will look like jerks.
5	5	"WKUK Ep. 05"	Zach Cregger	Trevor Moore (Head Writer), Sam Brown, Zach Cregger, Darren Trumeter & Timmy Williams	April 10, 2007
1. If You Think - A bunny, a dog, and a man will die in a fiery explosion if you obey the on-screen text.; 2. Dating Game - Trevor hosts a dating game, where the contestant, Barbara (Darren), gets nothing but misogynistic responses of sexual desire from the three bachelors, Sam, Zach, and Timmy. The sketch then is revealed to have been performed as a sketch to criticize offensiveness, only for the cast members to be kicked off the set for various reasons; Timmy for an anti-Semitic remark, Zach claiming to be dating an underage girl, and Trevor advocating violence against the baby boomer generation. Sam, the only one left (aside from Darren in the background), ends the sketch with an offensive remark against Latin-Americans.; 3. Birds and Bees - Dad (Trevor) tells his son (Timmy) about the gross facts of life.; 4. Ghost Tea Bag - A fortune teller (Darren) reads Zach's palm and sees several spirits around him, one of which is "tea bagging" him.; 5. Girl Sympathy - A group of women (WKUK) evoke sympathy from each other by talking about their feminine issues.; 6. Ghost Tea Bag 2 - The fortune teller's prediction of Zach's promotion comes true.; 7. You're Peeing on My Leg - Two English gentlemen (Zach, Trevor) are at an impasse in the park.; 8. John Wilkes Booth - During a play at Ford’s Theatre, John Wilkes Booth (Trevor) repeatedly assaults Abraham Lincoln (Zach) with items such as a phone book, an orange, and his shoe, and even throws his stovepipe hat off of the balcony. Lincoln constantly calls for his security guard (Darren), when all he wants to do is enjoy the play in peace with his wife Mary (Timmy).
6	6	"WKUK Ep. 06"	Zach Cregger & Trevor Moore	Trevor Moore (Head Writer), Sam Brown, Zach Cregger, Darren Trumeter & Timmy Williams	April 24, 2007
1. Heaven - In a B&W sequence, (Trevor) finds himself in heaven with a beautiful fairy, a car, and a puppy in a hatbox. "Ask your doctor about suicide." 2. I Want to Kill the President - Trevor flirts with danger in a PSA about it being illegal to state one's desire to kill the President of the United States of America on television.; 3. Bogey on My Six - Two pilots (Sam, Trevor) have an awkward discussion about their friendship while in mid-air.; 4. Slow Jerkin' - In the workplace, Darren creeps out Trevor and Sam with his mimed masturbation movements.; 5. Race War - Dave (Trevor) alerts Bill (Sam) about a race war.; 6. Bigfoot vs. Gravedigger - Two monster truck drivers (Sam, Trevor) encounter each other at a house party, and destroy the living room.; 7. Sub Sandwich - On a submarine, sailors guffaw at the type of sandwich (Trevor) happens to have.; 8. I Don't Know Bob - Two hunters named Bob and Jerry (Darren and Trevor) talk their way through the aftermath of accidentally shooting another hunter (Zach).
7	7	"WKUK Ep. 07"	Zach Cregger	Trevor Moore (Head Writer), Sam Brown, Zach Cregger, Darren Trumeter & Timmy Williams	May 1, 2007
1. Dear Black People - As a school project, 6-year-old Danny Mathison (Timmy) sends a letter to the black people of the world, apologizing for slavery in the United States, as well as any other such things to befall black people in years past. In response, the black people write back an angry, hostile message.; 2. Hot Air Balloon Poop Rope - An American exchange student (Sam) takes a hot air balloon ride with a British family (Trevor, Zach, Darren), and suddenly needs to use the water closet.; 3. Firing Squad - At an execution, the firing squad, consisting of Sam, Zach, and Darren, only have one bullet amongst them all to kill convicted traitor Frank Rosenthorp (Timmy). This way, nobody will know who fired the shot, and no one is to feel any guilt over killing him. This leads to trouble when Trevor attempts to carry out the execution, having to shuffle around the guns quite a few times.; 4. Accidental Puke - William (Trevor) throws up at the dinner table.; 5. Gallon of PCP - College buddies Zach and Trevor run into each other in the park; Zach has a liquid gallon of PCP.; 6. Kool Aid - A trailer for an epic movie in which (Trevor) turns the ocean orange.; 7. Gross Out - Trevor grosses out an audience by drinking out of buckets filled with various disgusting substances.; 8. Point/Counterpoint – National Hunting Board chairman and gun enthusiast Jerry Bronham (Trevor) talks about gun control on the debate show Point/Counterpoint, where he argues with host Barney Ballsack (Darren) over usage of handguns in common violent crimes, with other debate topics including guns that can shoot though bulletproof vests, and bullets that seek out baby skulls. After an aggravated Barney storms out of the studio, he is cornered by a street gang member (Sam) wearing a baby skull around his neck, who intends to assault him. Upon seeing this, Jerry loads a baby skull-seeking bullet and fires it at the gang member, only for it to fly off course and shoot a nearby baby in the arms of its mother. As the mother screams out in horror, Jerry slowly slinks back into the TV studio.
8	8	"WKUK Ep. 08"	Trevor Moore	Trevor Moore (Head Writer), Sam Brown, Zach Cregger, Darren Trumeter & Timmy Williams	May 8, 2007
1. Pie - (Sam) realizes he's been typing on a pie instead of a keyboard.; 2. Acting Class - On the last day of high school, seniors Darren and Timmy have to do a "cause and effect" exercise that counts for 50% of their grade. Timmy creeps Darren out with homo-erotic pantomiming, and Darren’s objections lead his teacher (Zach) to give him a failing grade for the school year.; 3. Demon Ouija Board - Demon Balthasar (Trevor) is summoned from Hell to control the ouija board at a girls' slumber party.; 4. Flower Monster - After picking up a card with a seductive message, (Trevor) arms himself with a baseball bat as he follows a trail of rose petals upstairs, thinking there's a flower monster in the bedroom.; 5. Rape Role Play - Forgetful Sandra (Sam) and her husband (Zach) prepare to enact a role-playing fantasy involving rape. In order to ensure Sandra doesn't forget that it is only role play and alert the police again, her husband gives her a safety word, "banana", to use if she wants to stop role playing, which she forgets.; 6. Timmy Dance - Timmy does a seductive dance in his underwear.; 7. Sam in the Bag - Two sitcom characters (Trevor, Sam) try to cover their tracks after consuming pot. The history behind the sketch is revealed in a long documentary segment.
9	9	"WKUK Ep. 09"	Zach Cregger	Trevor Moore (Head Writer), Sam Brown, Zach Cregger, Darren Trumeter & Timmy Williams	May 15, 2007
1. Pirates - The captain (Trevor) has trouble getting pirates' attention.; 2. Glory Hole - Candace (Timmy) catches her husband (Trevor) at the ol' glory hole.; 3. Attention Guy - Zach constantly needs attention from the rest of the troupe. He improvises a song about Attention Deficit Disorder, then hangs himself.; 4. Bank Heist - Bank robbers (Zach, Trevor, Sam & Darren) continually fail to pull off a heist.; 5. Mrs. President - Perverse department agents (Sam, Trevor, Darren) must behave around the first female president (Zach).; 6. Mom and Dad's Divorce - In home room, Steven (Trevor) talks about his parents' divorce.; 7. Tattoo Parlor - A drunk businessman (Trevor) stumbles into a tattoo parlor and asks for a bizarre tattoo.
10	10	"WKUK Ep. 10"	Trevor Moore	Trevor Moore (Head Writer), Sam Brown, Zach Cregger, Darren Trumeter & Timmy Williams	May 22, 2007
1. Jim Bust - JISM - In excitement, Trevor breaks the door to producer Jim Biederman's office and gives a proposal with a perverse acronym.; 2. We Gon' Make Love - Trevor stars in a semi-sexy R&B video where he describes having sex with unconscious women.; 3. Motorcycle Mama - Billy (Zach) wants to play a bizarre pretend game, but Timmy would rather play Sega. Billy's dad (Trevor) makes him disappear by repeating "I don't believe in you".; 4. Jim Bust - Jim's Gay - Trevor asks Jim a trick question.; 5. Timmy Dance 2 - Timmy does a hoedown in his underwear.; 6. Screamers - A sophomore (Trevor) sells some new drugs -- two "screamers" and a "small world" -- to some impressed freshmen (Sam, Zach, Darren).; 7. Mr. T Gets Cancer - Blackout: Trevor and Timmy perform a short play about Mr. T getting some bad news.; 8. Jim Bust - Fart - Timmy and Trevor (and the janitor) walk into Jim's office just so they can torture Jim with their farts.; 9. Gun Face - Bored, Darren and Sam pretend to mutilate Zach while he's on the phone.; 10. Mountain of Chairs - 13-year-old Timmy's parents (Zach, Sam) trust him enough to leave him alone on his birthday but won't let him live on a mountain of chairs.; 11. Jim Bust - Puppy - For a change, Trevor gives Jim a nice surprise - a puppy. When Jim objects, saying that he doesn't have the time or space for owning a puppy, Trevor tells him not to worry, as the puppy, appropriately named "Wormy", is terminally ill.

== Season 2 (2008) ==
No. overall	No. in season	Title	Directed by	Written by	Original release date
11	1	"WKUK Ep. 11"	Zach Cregger & Trevor Moore	Trevor Moore (Head Writer), Sam Brown, Zach Cregger, Darren Trumeter & Timmy Williams	February 10, 2008
1. Sam's Nut I - Trevor points out to Sam that one of Sam's testes keeps popping out.; 2. The Dinosaur Rap - Trevor stars in a rap video about getting high with dinosaurs.; 3. Neil & Buzz - Two ghetto-astronauts (Trevor, Timmy) are about to land on the moon.; 4. Sam's Nut II - At the movies, Trevor notices Sam's testicle hanging from his collar.; 5. Racist Show Pitches - It takes a racist-sounding "fish out of water" story for a television pitch to go well -- or so Zach thinks. Unfortunately, all of his ideas, including 'Yuppie-Indentured Servant", "Black Doctor" "Jewtown", "Too Many Lesbos", and "What's The Deal With Mexican Tits?" are shot down by network executive Trevor.; 6. Air Dry - On a blind date, (Trevor) learns something unusual about his date (Jenny Slate).; 7. Sam's Nut III - Sam experiences embarrassment on the show "Double Date".; 8. Happier with your Mouth Open - A director (Zach) gives odd direction to actors (Trevor, Darren) on a dramatic cop show.; 9. Fart Dinner - At a restaurant, (Trevor) pretends to have gas.; 10. Blind Not Blind - The doctor (Zach) gives (Sam) a pair of glasses, which makes him see how ugly his wife (Timmy) is.
12	2	"WKUK Ep. 12"	Zach Cregger & Trevor Moore	Trevor Moore (Head Writer), Sam Brown, Zach Cregger, Darren Trumeter & Timmy Williams	February 17, 2008
1. String Pull - At a dinner date, (Sam) pulls a very long piece of string out of his teeth, which is attached to his organs.; 2. Oh Shit - Two peeping toms (Trevor, Timmy) watch a lady stripping from a window, and accidentally cause a chain of deaths to happen.; 3. The Never Song - Trevor sings a kids' song about how to stay out of trouble, by not disrespecting their parents, by not cheating on tests, and not making crystal meth.; 4. Be a Cop - A recruitment trailer to join the (trigger-happy) police force.; 5. Cowboy - Cowboys (WKUK) need to put on campfire shows for each other. Timmy walks off the set in anger.; 6. Feeler Doc - A doctor (Trevor) has an immense fear of touching a patient's (Zach) lumpy testicle.; 7. You Can See Me - Blackout: (Darren) thinks he's invisible, until he punches (Sam).; 8. Blue Whale Dick - In a scene from the sitcom The McLaughlins, rebellious teens Michael (Zach) and Caleb (Trevor) have gotten animal genitalia attached to their heads.
13	3	"WKUK Ep. 13"	Zach Cregger & Trevor Moore	Trevor Moore (Head Writer), Sam Brown, Zach Cregger, Darren Trumeter & Timmy Williams	February 24, 2008
1. Instant Karma Bigot - For every slur, (Zach) gets what's coming to him.; 2. Weird - At a gentleman's club, Trevor, Zach and Timmy learn what a stripper (Darren) will do for money.; 3. Joining the Army - Enthusiastic (Trevor) and (Zach) have a scenario in mind for what they'd do in the army.; 4. JFK Assassination - In Dallas, during a visit from President John F. Kennedy (Zach), Vice President Lyndon Johnson (Sam) drops in on sniper Lee Harvey Oswald (Trevor) at the Dallas Book Depository, as part of a planned assassination, which throws Oswald off course and leads to an argument between them over how Oswald wants to carry the assassination out. Meanwhile, Kennedy is driven mad by his prodding wife, Jackie (Timmy), who requests that the driver of their car (Darren) play an incredibly annoying song. Oswald and Kennedy, both fed up with their current situations, sing a duet from afar, dreaming of a world where they can do what they want without trouble. Ultimately, someone else shoots Kennedy, and Oswald flees the scene upon prompting from Johnson.; 5. Saggy Sammy - Little Kevin (Timmy) shows his parents (Trevor, Zach) a drawing of an elephant.; 6. George Lucas - A teenager (Trevor) pitches an idea for Star Wars VII to George Lucas (Sam), who dies of excitement, leaving the franchise in the teen's hands.; 7. The America Song - A country singer (Trevor) is "totally gay for America" and Uncle Sam (Sam).
14	4	"WKUK Ep. 14"	Zach Cregger & Trevor Moore	Trevor Moore (Head Writer), Sam Brown, Zach Cregger, Darren Trumeter & Timmy Williams	March 2, 2008
1. Guillotine Days - Before Marie Antoinette (Timmy) is beheaded, one of the executioners (Trevor) asks her to help him settle a bet with Darren. Trevor claims that the human head can stay alive for up to minutes after being cut off by the guillotine, and asks her to try and recite the alphabet before she dies. Her head is cut off, and she fails to do so. Rinse and repeat two more times with two more men sentenced to execution.; 2. Forever Puppies - A business that prevents cute puppies from turning into dogs.; 3. Francis Scott Key - In prison, Francis Scott Key (Sam) wants to write "The Star-Spangled Banner".; 4. Mount Everest - A long, four-act sketch about an adventurer (Zach) who is blackmailed by a crafty diamond thief (Trevor).
15	5	"WKUK Ep. 15"	Zach Cregger & Trevor Moore	Trevor Moore (Head Writer), Sam Brown, Zach Cregger, Darren Trumeter & Timmy Williams	March 9, 2008
1. Reverse Psychology - Sam becomes annoying after learning about reverse psychology.; 2. You Son of a Bitch - (Trevor) finds a man (Darren) kicking another man (Sam) for killing his children, but when it’s revealed that the man being assaulted was an executioner who executed the man’s children on Death Row, it leads (Trevor) to switch sides and begin kicking (Darren). The cycle repeats until (Trevor) finds out that both men are guilty of something, and begins kicking both. It is then revealed that this was the origin of a popular dance at bars and speakeasies known as "You Son of a Bitch".; 3. I Teached A Whale - When Billy (Trevor) tells his class at school that he taught a whale to "jump out of its tail" over the summer, his teacher, Ms. Lambert (Zach) doesn't believe him, and goes out of her way on a wild goose chase in an attempt to prove him wrong.; 4. The Raddest Kid Ever - Billy's dad (Trevor) thinks his son looks amazing with a gun in his hand.; 5. Religious Cult - Trevor and Sam ponder about the religious cult they're in.; 6. Nail Gun - After Dad (Timmy) talks to his sons about his newfound sex life and leaves for the store with Mom (Darren), (Trevor) and (Zach) fool around with a nail gun, and Trevor accidentally kills (Sam) with it. The two remaining brothers manage to bring him back to life with the Necronomicon. However, upon the parents’ return, they are found out when Sam begins uttering Hell-speak, and he is splashed with holy water. Although Mom and Dad praise Trevor and Zach for their smart thinking and use of the Necronomicon, they ground them, and also find out why Sam went straight to Hell instead of Purgatory upon being killed with the nail gun - he is in possession of a stash of pornography, which they confiscate as a result.; 7. Irresponsible Television - Kids' television programs are repeatedly pulled from the air "due to reckless irresponsibility". These include shows involving young Billy Matherson becoming a superhero known as "Electro Boy" after sticking a fork in an electrical outlet, a boy befriending a pedophile (Timmy) in "My Secret Friend", and two children planning to rape their attractive babysitter.; 8. Aren't You Lucky - Trevor's song about God is sung in other countries.
16	6	"WKUK Ep. 16"	Zach Cregger & Trevor Moore	Trevor Moore (Head Writer), Sam Brown, Zach Cregger, Darren Trumeter & Timmy Williams	March 16, 2008
1. Forest Whitaker - Trevor mistakes Zach and Timmy for Forest Whitaker.; 2. Manatee Finger Bang - The morose king (Zach) needs something special to please him. Captain Crunch (Darren) has the solution: a beautiful "mermaid" (Sam).; 3. Office Head Explosion - At the office, Darren's co-workers (Trevor, Sam, and Zach) mess with his head while he's asleep, and realize they have a special power when they somehow cause his head to explode.; 4. Period Sketch - Teenage Margaret (Trevor) tries to dodge the Fairy of Womanhood (Zach), until she hears from Rationality (Darren).; 5. Ninja School - No one showed up for the first day of Ninja School -- or did they?; 6. Our Label is Run by Homos - A record label signs a band with an unusual name. Their debut CD is titled "No Seriously, All Of Us At The Label Are Gay Dudes. This Is Just Our Way Of Coming Out." This results in an awkward press conference.
17	7	"WKUK Ep. 17"	Zach Cregger & Trevor Moore	Trevor Moore (Head Writer), Sam Brown, Zach Cregger, Darren Trumeter & Timmy Williams	March 23, 2008
1. Falling Ladies - In a sketch that ends bloody, Zach alerts Sam and Trevor about something happening outside.; 2. Tar Toast #1 - A Hollywood screenwriter tries an unusual hors d'ouerve at a party.; 3. Successful Relationship - Harold's (Trevor) volatile relationship with his wife (Sam) is the basis for the how-to book he's writing.; 4. Tar Toast #2 - The screenwriter has to pitch his new idea to the very same person who tricked him into eating street tar.; 5. Underwater - Daddy's little girl Nancy (Zach) introduces her new beau d'Artagnan (Sam) to her parents, (Trevor and Timmy), only for her desires to “live underwater” with him to be shot down by her father, who claims they cannot survive without oxygen. Nancy however thinks it is because he doesn’t like d'Artagnan.; 6. Shark Man - Annoying superhero Shark Man (Trevor) has to manually re-fill his lungs with air.; 7. Drunk Dad - Susie's dad (Trevor) comes home hammered during her birthday party.; 8. Time Travel Friends - Trevor and Sam decide to go back in time to stop 9/11.
18	8	"WKUK Ep. 18"	Zach Cregger & Trevor Moore	Trevor Moore (Head Writer), Sam Brown, Zach Cregger, Darren Trumeter & Timmy Williams	March 30, 2008
1. Take My Face Off - A patient (Trevor) has an odd surgery request.; 2. Boiler Room - Boiler room repairman Clark (Trevor) has little sympathy for the yacht passengers in danger of drowning, as he makes constant remarks about the yacht crew’s lack of proper boiler maintenance.; 3. Driving Instructor - Audio sketch: a driving instructor gets friendly with his student.; 4. Marijuana To Go - A commercial ends before it even starts.; 5. Alzheimer's - Sammy (Sam) messes with his grandma (Darren).; 6. Auto Erotic - Trevor quickly regrets the way he died; God gives him a second chance at the wrong time.; 7. Bear Problems - The president's press secretary (Trevor) hosts a conference about bears on the moon.; 8. Good Morning Dad - A boy's (Trevor) attempt to bond with his dad (Sam) backfires.
19	9	"WKUK Ep. 19"	Zach Cregger & Trevor Moore	Trevor Moore (Head Writer), Sam Brown, Zach Cregger, Darren Trumeter & Timmy Williams	April 6, 2008
1. Invincible Kid - Blackout: Trevor gives a pep talk to a kid.; 2. Sniper Business - Jenkins (Zach) is warned by his war-hungry boss Mr. Welburn (Trevor) that there's a sniper on the roof of the headquarters of rival company Bergman-Sachs’ building across the street - hired to prevent a merger between the two corporations. A shocked and confused Jenkins watches his boss teach him how to handle these matters, by equipping a sniper rifle and taking down the sniper at Bergman-Sachs.; 3. Dogs Love Boobs! - A self-explanatory blackout.; 4. Greatest Conductor - An armless conductor (Zach) conducts with his feet.; 5. Alcoholic Husband - A woman (Elizabeth Bocs) continually catches her husband (Sam) drinking beer in different ways.; 6. The Complete Human History of the Last 10,000 Years in Seven Seconds - The moral of a vignette: you will get stabbed if you have gold.; 7. Office Insubordination - Zach and Sam have a better relationship with the boss (Timmy) than newbie Darren does.; 8. Entertainment Today - A tan anchor (Trevor) reports on Steve Buscemi.; 9. T2 9-1-1 - Audio sketch: a caller's emergency situation resembles the plot of Terminator 2.; 10. Cloud Watching - (Sam) and (Trevor) look at cloud formations.; 11. Virtual Knuckle Sandwich - Angry Clyde (Sam) takes Mabel (Timmy) to Virtual World to give her a knuckle sandwich.; 12. Video Time Capsule for the Year 3000 - Capitalism still reigns.; 13. Homeless Love at First Sight - (Trevor) and a homeless woman (Kristen Schaal) feel an instant connection.
20	10	"WKUK Ep. 20 (LIVE IN NEW YORK)"	Zach Cregger & Trevor Moore	Trevor Moore (Head Writer), Sam Brown, Zach Cregger, Darren Trumeter & Timmy Williams	April 13, 2008
1. Blind Guys - For blind stand-up comedians (Darren, Trevor), telling jokes is never routine.; 2. Whirlpool - Gordon (Trevor) and Candice (Zach) get caught in a whirlpool … and an argument.; 3. Line Leader - At school, newly appointed line leader Ryan (Sam) prepares his battalion for an epic fight with the fifth-graders.; 4. Dolphin Song - A guitarist (Zach) tries to integrate his pet dolphin (Trevor) into his act on an open mic night.; 5. Sonic the Hedgehog Gets Mugged - Blackout sketch. Trevor, posing as Sonic, is punched by a mugger (Darren); all of the coins in Sonic’s hands are scattered everywhere (in a similar fashion to the rings the character collects).; 6. Zach Dating Karen - Zach breaks the fourth wall and asks the audience to settle arguments between him and his girlfriend (Sam).; 7. The Dinosaur Rap (Live) - The grand finale - Trevor raps about getting high with dinosaurs .

== Season 3 (2009) ==
No. overall	No. in season	Title	Directed by	Written by	Original release date
21	1	"WKUK Ep. 21"	Zach Cregger & Trevor Moore	Trevor Moore (Head Writer), Sam Brown, Zach Cregger, Darren Trumeter & Timmy Williams	January 27, 2009
1. Chaplin - In a 1940s war movie, soldiers encounter Charlie Chaplin (Trevor) -- or is it Hitler?; 2. Bible Stories - Luther B. (Trevor) promotes his own "cool" version of the Bible: a set of videos.; 3. Feline Delights - A seductive cat food ad.; 4. Dumb Newscast - In the midst of a Mall Bitches marathon, a music television newscaster (Trevor) reports on an alien abduction and Ozzfest.; 5. Car Dealership - Car dealer Mitch Huggins (Sam) stars in a commercial with his unenthusiastic sons (Trevor, Darren).
22	2	"WKUK Ep. 22"	Zach Cregger & Trevor Moore	Trevor Moore (Head Writer), Sam Brown, Zach Cregger, Darren Trumeter & Timmy Williams	February 3, 2009
1. Little Rascals - In an homage to The Little Rascals, (Trevor) and (Sam) make their way into a bar by disguising themselves as a tall person, and end up meeting another tall person (Zach, Timmy).; 2. Call of Duty - During a multiplayer video game, Dabears (Timmy) needs a sandwich.; 3. The God Says Song - Trevor sings about what he's heard from God over the years.
23	3	"WKUK Ep. 23"	Zach Cregger & Trevor Moore	Trevor Moore (Head Writer), Sam Brown, Zach Cregger, Darren Trumeter & Timmy Williams	February 10, 2009
1. Water Balloons - A young businessman (Darren) introduces water balloons to a quiet town in the Wild West.; 2. Hot Dog Timmy - Timmy is forced to explain his eating habits to his doctor, and his tendency for eating at least one hot dog per day.; 3. JJ Marvin - Punk rockers (Timmy, Darren) aren't sure what to think of JJ Marvin's (Zach) act.
24	4	"WKUK Ep. 24"	Zach Cregger & Trevor Moore	Trevor Moore (Head Writer), Sam Brown, Zach Cregger, Darren Trumeter & Timmy Williams	February 17, 2009
1. Foot Touch - Two homophobic men (Trevor, Sam) cause a stir at dinner.; 2. Bad Panda - Terry (Trevor) wants a job at the zoo, as the guy who beats up misbehaving animals.; 3. Runway - Women (WKUK) at a fashion show are very enthusiastic about the new season's fashions. And glitter.; 4. Gandalf - Gandalf (Trevor) is greeted by an angry Fellowship, who gripe with how he didn't use his giant eagle companion sooner, accuse him of not being magic - and ultimately, in a fit of rage, rape him.
25	5	"WKUK Ep. 25"	Zach Cregger & Trevor Moore	Trevor Moore (Head Writer), Sam Brown, Zach Cregger, Darren Trumeter & Timmy Williams	February 24, 2009
1. Presidential Props - New rules at the presidential debate shake things up for unprepared candidate Senator Homestead (Timmy).; 2. Island Cannibal - Two guys (Timmy, Darren) stranded on an island are desperate for food and resort to eating each other.; 3. Helicopter Door - During the Vietnam War, two soldiers are in a helicopter; one (Sam) tells the other (Trevor) to close the door.; 4. Super Dog - Presidential Props Part 2: The party started at the debate continues at da club with a bangin' song.
26	6	"WKUK Ep. 26"	Zach Cregger & Trevor Moore	Trevor Moore (Head Writer), Sam Brown, Zach Cregger, Darren Trumeter & Timmy Williams	March 3, 2009
1. Trent Reznor - Trent Reznor's (Trevor) arrogant ex-girlfriend (Zach) pays him a visit just to torture him emotionally, causing him to write another Grammy-winning album.; 2. Homeschool - Caleb (Trevor) doesn't take homeschooling seriously.; 3. Telekinesis - (Sam) masters telekinesis, and immediately knows what to use it for … in bed.; 4. Dog Park - With their new x-ray glasses, pervs (Trevor) and (Darren) can see through dogs' clothing.
27	7	"WKUK Ep. 27"	Zach Cregger & Trevor Moore	Trevor Moore (Head Writer), Sam Brown, Zach Cregger, Darren Trumeter & Timmy Williams	March 10, 2009
1. Asian Hooker - A company CEO (Trevor) brings an unexpected distraction into the meeting room - a Vietnamese prostitute who tried to steal from his wallet. The boss tries to keep the other workers on track, but it gets harder to concentrate when the prostitute's pimp arrives.; 2. Skatefall - Mr. McGillicuddy (Sam) gets fed up with skateboarding.; 3. Earthquake - During an earthquake, a news anchor (Timmy) accidentally swears on the air. During the anchor's trial, the earthquake stops, and everyone celebrates with shaken-up sodas.; 4. Boner Song - A song performed by the cast, about things that are hard to do, weird to do, or not advised to do, when you've got a boner.
28	8	"WKUK Ep. 28"	Zach Cregger & Trevor Moore	Trevor Moore (Head Writer), Sam Brown, Zach Cregger, Darren Trumeter & Timmy Williams	March 17, 2009
1. Tit Slap - At a party with mostly black people, (Trevor) obeys the lyrics to a crunk song -- big mistake!; 2. John Hancock - Who really was the first to sign the Declaration of Independence?; 3. Bad Dominatrix - A professional dominatrix (Trevor) tries to show a newbie (Sam) the ropes.; 4. Bobo the Monkey - At NASA, the head scientist (Trevor) tries to make his team sever their close ties with Bobo, the first monkey in space.
29	9	"WKUK Ep. 29"	Zach Cregger & Trevor Moore	Trevor Moore (Head Writer), Sam Brown, Zach Cregger, Darren Trumeter & Timmy Williams	March 24, 2009
1. Horses Love - Darryl (Darren) wants to arouse his horse for insemination purposes. Chester's (Trevor) stegosaurus poster does the trick.; 2. Loveliest Bride - Blood-stained Candice (Sam) will stop at nothing -- NOTHING -- to see the latest chick flick, The Most Loveliest Bride.; 3. Fight Club - Trumeter (Sam) has to deal with his Fight Club-obsessed boss (Timmy) -- who goes down with one punch.; 4. The Popcorn Factory Sketch - At the office, Trevor thinks a girl with testicles (but not a penis) would be hot, but he has trouble convincing his co-workers (Sam and Zach). It isn't until the end of the sketch that it is revealed that the office is for a popcorn factory.
30	10	"WKUK Ep. 30"	Zach Cregger & Trevor Moore	Trevor Moore (Head Writer), Sam Brown, Zach Cregger, Darren Trumeter & Timmy Williams	March 31, 2009
1. Shoshon - Shoshon the Elegant, the White Tiger King (Trevor), wants to keep all the brown tigers out of the kingdom of Animalia.; 2. Lawnmower Dad - A hapless dad (Trevor) tries to cover up his lawnmower accident by faking the dog's suicide.; 3. Elves - Trevor and Sam play with an x-ray machine while waiting for the doctor, and learn about Sam's digestive system.; 4. Blue Hair Timmy - After getting his hair dyed, Timmy gets hit by a car.
31	11	"WKUK Ep. 31"	Zach Cregger & Trevor Moore	Trevor Moore (Head Writer), Sam Brown, Zach Cregger, Darren Trumeter & Timmy Williams	April 7, 2009
1. Shitchest Boner Neck - Three ambassadors (Trevor, Sam, Timmy) have trouble negotiating with two very peculiar (and gross) aliens (Darren, Zach).; 2. Crack - In 1984, two hip-hop posers (Trevor, Sam) turn a black man into a crack dealer.; 3. What is it Baby - Two sarcastic parents (Trevor, Zach) chide their crying infant child for waking them up at night.; 4. Last Action Hero - A realistic twist on a scene from the movie.
32	12	"WKUK Ep. 32"	Zach Cregger & Trevor Moore	Trevor Moore (Head Writer), Sam Brown, Zach Cregger, Darren Trumeter & Timmy Williams	April 14, 2009
1. Yellow Mustard-ed - The hidden-camera reality show, You've Been Yellow Mustard-ed!, is both successful and controversial.; 2. Kindergarten Cons - Another "fish-out-of-water" movie trailer, where five of the toughest convicted criminals are sent to kindergarten.; 3. Table Monster - Debbie's (Sam) husband (Zach) has mastered the art of getting out of a dinner with his annoying wife and her annoying BFF (Trevor).
33	13	"WKUK Ep. 33"	Zach Cregger & Trevor Moore	Trevor Moore (Head Writer), Sam Brown, Zach Cregger, Darren Trumeter & Timmy Williams	April 21, 2009
1. Genie - Billy Masterson (Timmy) gets his own genie (Sam), who is forced to carry out his three wishes - to kill his teacher, to let him have sex with 12th grader Megan Weldley, and to become President of the United States of America.; 2. Epilepsy Test - Do you, the viewer, have epilepsy? Please be patient while the results load.; 3. Bad Employee - At a fast-food restaurant, employee Brian (Trevor) is on the job while sick, and vomits in front of the customers in line to order, resulting in him getting fired by his manager, Mr. Legursky (Zach).
34	14	"WKUK Ep. 34"	Zach Cregger & Trevor Moore	Trevor Moore (Head Writer), Sam Brown, Zach Cregger, Darren Trumeter & Timmy Williams	April 28, 2009
1. Grapist - At a boardroom meeting, an executive (Zach) finds a commercial for Fizzy-Pops Grape Blast soda questionable, as he alleges that it alludes to rape - much to the disbelief and chagrin of the head of the boardroom (Trevor). It doesn't seem to help that the mascot (Sam) is named the Grapist.; 2. Lottery - (Sam) stupidly spends his lottery winnings on lottery tickets.; 3. Ronald Reagan - President Ronald Reagan (Zach) would rather talk with fans about movies than work on political issues. John Hinckley Jr. (Trevor) is told by a talking dog to shoot President Reagan - but the dog is actually a mechanical decoy set up by Vice President George H.W. Bush (Sam) in an attempt to assume the presidency. John ends up getting distracted and begins talking about movies with the exasperated dog (Bush), until John mentions Jodie Foster in Taxi Driver. The dog (Bush) claims to know Jodie Foster, and that he’ll “get [Foster] to blow [John]” if he shoots Reagan, a deal to which he agrees.
35	15	"WKUK Ep. 35"	Zach Cregger & Trevor Moore	Trevor Moore (Head Writer), Sam Brown, Zach Cregger, Darren Trumeter & Timmy Williams	May 5, 2009
1. American Suicide - Participants on an American Idol-style show compete to see who can kill themselves in the most creative and/or impressive ways. A woman named Cheyenne (Trevor) is the only contestant to move on to the callbacks in Hollywood.; 2. Anarchy - Barry (Darren) is the sole rational thinker in a team of anarchists.; 3. RC Glow - An executive (Zach) has an idea for RC Cola.
36	16	"WKUK Ep. 36"	Zach Cregger & Trevor Moore	Trevor Moore (Head Writer), Sam Brown, Zach Cregger, Darren Trumeter & Timmy Williams	May 12, 2009
1. Courtroom Stripper - A stripper (Bobbi Bentzel) is called to testify in court, but ends up entertaining her audience instead.; 2. Dad Story - Daddy (Sam) tells his daughter (Caroline Toto) the story of how she came along. The Jolly Green Giant (Trevor) shows up on their roof.; 3. Life Goes Alien - A family (Sam, Darren) encounters some aliens (Trevor, Zach, Timmy), who mock them.
37	17	"WKUK Ep. 37"	Zach Cregger & Trevor Moore	Trevor Moore (Head Writer), Sam Brown, Zach Cregger, Darren Trumeter & Timmy Williams	May 19, 2009
1. Wheel of Money - Copyright issues, dismemberment, decapitations, and switching problems plague an obvious ripoff of that one game show.; 2. Butler Sketch - Five seconds with a butler (Trevor) upon his first arrival in Haiti.; 3. Hiking Documentary - A hiker (Sam) is left to die while a documentary is being filmed.; 4. Back Seat - The back seat of the bus is the best spot for two Socialist hoodlums (Trevor, Sam).
38	18	"WKUK Ep. 38"	Zach Cregger & Trevor Moore	Trevor Moore (Head Writer), Sam Brown, Zach Cregger, Darren Trumeter & Timmy Williams	May 26, 2009
1. End of Space - A space traveler (Trevor) provides some unnecessary narration. In the void beyond space, unusual things happen.; 2. Donkey Dad - Daddy (Sam) has to have a talk with his daughter about what he was doing with the donkey.; 3. Casual Friday - Brian (Trevor) is not too comfortable with Steven's (Zach) choice of shirt for Casual Friday.; 4. Hippo in the City - A hippopotamus wanders through New York City. Look at that hippo go.
39	19	"WKUK Ep. 39"	Zach Cregger & Trevor Moore	Trevor Moore (Head Writer), Sam Brown, Zach Cregger, Darren Trumeter & Timmy Williams	June 2, 2009
1. Jerkocaust - In the year 2027, the Nazis (Timmy, Trevor) are on the hunt for jerks, not Jews. When they suspect a citizen (Zach) of harboring a jerk (Sam), they bring in a nerd (Darren) in an attempt to coax out the jerk.; 2. Trophy Coach - The losing team's coach (Sam) gets more respect than the winning team's coach (Timmy) by giving out trophies to every player on his team, even though they lost.; 3. Helicopter Wife Cheating - During a newscast, the helicopter pilot (Trevor) gets distracted when he recognizes his wife's car on the freeway.
40	20	"WKUK Ep. 40"	Zach Cregger & Trevor Moore	Trevor Moore (Head Writer), Sam Brown, Zach Cregger, Darren Trumeter & Timmy Williams	June 2, 2009
1. Another Astronaut Sketch - The moment before the Space Shuttle Challenger took off.; 2. Not Particularly Sure - Outsourcing leaves little for a company to do at headquarters.; 3. Maroon President - The president (Sam) has discovered a new color … or has he?; 4. Bathroom Camera - At a christening party, Timmy shows off the new bathroom cameras he's installed.

== Season 4 (2010) ==
No. overall	No. in season	Title	Directed by	Written by	Original release date
41	1	"WKUK Ep. 41"	Zach Cregger & Trevor Moore	Trevor Moore (Head Writer), Sam Brown, Zach Cregger, Darren Trumeter & Timmy Williams	June 11, 2010
1. Grandma's Cookies - Blackout: A scary ad for Hazy Memories Nursing Home.; 2. Alien Autopsy - An alien turns out to be a piñata filled with Reese's Pieces.; 3. Jaws - Everyone thinks there's a bear in the ocean -- but it's a shark. Sailor Flynn (Trevor) gives a long speech about sharks.; 4. Love at First Sight - Stan (Sam) meets Stacy (Darren) and Betty (Trevor) at a party, but can't get them to kiss each other.; 5. We Got a Runner! - Mother (Darren) has trouble delivering a baby. "WE GOT A RUNNER!"; 6. Santa Clause - Santa (Sam) gets stuck in the chimney with his pants down.; 7. Sex Robot - A horny robot is taken to jail, put on trial and sentenced to hanging.; 8. Mouth Stuck Open - The doctor (Zach) doesn't think (Trevor)'s mouth is stuck open.; 9. Rip Your Dick Off - At the Homeware store, an employee (Zach) advises a customer (Sam) against using a particularly strong vacuum for oral sex simulation, despite the customer's insistence that he only intends to clean his apartment.; 10. Barf Museum - Two fathers (Zach, Trevor) converse at a kids' museum devoted to regurgitation, and decide to ditch their kids.
42	2	"WKUK Ep. 42"	Zach Cregger & Trevor Moore	Trevor Moore (Head Writer), Sam Brown, Zach Cregger, Darren Trumeter & Timmy Williams	June 18, 2010
1. Hand Pee - Dave (Sam) hides the fact that he loves touching his own urine and excrement.; 2. Senator Clint Webb - A generic campaign ad.; 3. Changing Channels - Darren apologizes in advance for the next segment, which is an attempt by IFC to reel in viewers flipping past channels; the sketch is a suspense-builder which turns into a parody of Saturday Night Live.; 4. Alive Dicks - The WKUK are stranded in the frozen north, and have resorted to cannibalism. Only Sam and Timmy would eat a certain left over body part to stay alive.; 5. Dr. Kyle - Dr. Lewis (Zach) is scared of telling a child about his condition, but Dr. Kyle (Trevor) isn't.; 6. You Talkin' to Me? - (Trevor) tries to ease the pain of shooting his horse Clover while working on his DeNiro and Eastwood impressions. He forces his daughter Lindsey to assist him by sounding out the Terminator theme.; 7. Barney the Bear - Barney, the motorcycle-riding bear, escapes the circus to exact revenge on an old foe.; 8. Bike Up the Ass - A road accident between a businessman (Sam) and a cyclist (Zach) results in road rage, which is taken all the way to the hospital, then to court. It doesn't help that nobody understands anything unrelated to their own fields and professions.; 9. Titopotomus - A slew of stupid, made-up strip club names, which continues over the credits.
43	3	"WKUK Ep. 43"	Zach Cregger & Trevor Moore	Trevor Moore (Head Writer), Sam Brown, Zach Cregger, Darren Trumeter & Timmy Williams	June 25, 2010
1. Spaghetti Dinner Date - A twist on the famous scene from Lady and the Tramp.; 2. Mission Impossible - A mission briefing includes a bulldog and a handjob.; 3. Hamster Death - While a father (Zach) tries to educate his son (Timmy) on death when his pet hamster Tickles dies, things take a turn for the disturbing when the Grim Reaper shows up to consume the hamster's body. The father claims it's all part of the cycle of life, recalling when he was a child, when his grandmother died: it's revealed that the Grim Reaper ate the grandmother's body and then defecated into the grandmother's coffin at her funeral.; 4. Walk of Shame - A teacher (Trevor) corrects his student's (Darren) oral report containing information found on Wikipedia.; 5. Sam's Muscles - Dario (Sam) thinks that meeting the parents will go well.; 6. Boner Wedding - A con artist (Sam) makes the mistake of ODing on male enhancement supplements when he has to pose as a bride.; 7. Scrubbly Bubbles - A disinterested CEO (Trevor) messes with his company's ads.; 8. Trench Big Mouths - One by one, soldiers ham it up when they get shot, except Timmy.; 9. Dad Fight - Jerry's (Sam) opponent (Zach) goes down with one punch.; 10. Pet Heaven - After dying of carbon monoxide poisoning, Trevor ends up in the wrong heaven.
44	4	"WKUK Ep. 44"	Zach Cregger & Trevor Moore	Trevor Moore (Head Writer), Sam Brown, Zach Cregger, Darren Trumeter & Timmy Williams	July 2, 2010
1. Old Man Winters - (Trevor) and (Darren) tamper with an old man's will.; 2. Chicken Not Kitten - (Trevor's) restaurant gets a visit from a health inspector (Darren), who is suspicious of the restaurant serving cat meat, as the restaurant is named, "It's Not Kittens, It's Chicken". The health inspector soon finds that the restaurant serves dogs.; 3. Computer Jerk Off Dad - (Zach) jerks off when his family leaves to the store.; 4. Kid Beer - The Corheisen brewing company markets beer to children.; 5. Booger Blasters - A new squirt gun that squirts boogers instead of water.; 6. Walt Whitman - PBS reads some of Walt Whitman's diary from his teenage years, and find out how obsessed he was with breasts.; 7. Insult Restaurant - Jerry (Trevor) shows new employee Timmy the ropes as a waiter at Jack Off's Slop Shop, where it is customary for the waiters to insult the patrons. Timmy, however, ends up coming off as flat-out vulgar and offensive with his insults.; 8. Moon Landing - A student (Timmy) asks his teacher who shot the Moon landing footage.
45	5	"WKUK Ep. 45"	Zach Cregger & Trevor Moore	Trevor Moore (Head Writer), Sam Brown, Zach Cregger, Darren Trumeter & Timmy Williams	July 9, 2010
1. Poseidon Devil Spaghetti - Poseidon (Sam) and The Devil (Zach) eat spaghetti together.; 2. Pussy Salad - At a restaurant, two crude men named Phil and Colin (Darren and Sam) loudly state that Phil's salad tastes like pussy. It turns out to be a scheme set up by their coworker Harold (Trevor) - who is sitting at a nearby table - to expose his young son (Timmy) for eating pussy.; 3. Charles Manson - A shopping TV show sells some of Charles Manson's artwork.; 4. Jumbotron - A jumbotron at a basketball game continually zooms in on (Timmy).; 5. Clarence McKenah - Various black and white footage of Clarence McKenah (Zach) punching people.; 6. Kid Mechanic - Greg's (Trevor) kid is unconscious on the playground so Greg takes him to a mechanic.; 7. Timmy Talk - WKUK teases Timmy about his new TV show pilot that doesn't even exist.; 8. Bananas - (Trevor) smokes a banana peel.
46	6	"WKUK Ep. 46"	Zach Cregger & Trevor Moore	Trevor Moore (Head Writer), Sam Brown, Zach Cregger, Darren Trumeter & Timmy Williams	July 16, 2010
1. John Cleese Sketch - Trevor and Sam perform a sketch sent to them by John Cleese.; 2. Planet Earth Choke - Pilot for a new nature show hosted by (Sam).; 3. Dad Wired Shut - Helen's (Darren) dad's (Trevor) mouth is wired shut so he has to eat in a special way...; 4. A Is For - A rundown of crime novels written by Susan Merriweather, with their titles following the format of starting with a letter of the alphabet; it becomes clear that Merriweather has become exasperated and depressed at the fact that her contract forced her into making a novel for every letter of the alphabet.; 5. We Live in Garbage - A homeless man (Zach) and his family (Darren and Timmy) yell at a camera about how their toddler daughter got them evicted from their apartment. It isn't long before it's discovered that the homeless man is found out to be a lunatic making it all up, as there are no cameras nor a wife and son, although the daughter is present. A nearby bakery worker (Trevor) calls the cops when the homeless man flees the scene.; 6. 50 Cal Bar - (Zach) brings in a World War 1 machine gun to a bar.; 7. Cumfetti - Timmy finds that he is ejaculating confetti. It doesn't stop there, as his "cumfetti" impregnates his wife (Zach), which results in news breaking out of the world's first "cumfetti baby".; 8. Juror - (Trevor) tries to evade jury duty.
47	7	"WKUK Ep. 47"	Zach Cregger & Trevor Moore	Trevor Moore (Head Writer), Sam Brown, Zach Cregger, Darren Trumeter & Timmy Williams	July 23, 2010
1. Silver Street Performer - A street performer (Darren) acts like a robot.; 2. Cash Quiz - Osama Bin Laden (Trevor) is hosting a new game show to apologize for the World Trade Center attacks.; 3. Great Grandmas - (Darren) has a complaint about a pornographic film he bought, which he hoped would be a film about grandmas who were great, instead of a film about great grandmas.; 4. ButterBar - A fast food chain is forced by their corporate office to sell a new product called "ButterBar", which is essentially a stick of butter. Things go from bad to worse when a young boy buys and eats two ButterBars from the two employees at the counter (Trevor and Sam), and gets sick, resulting in them both getting a scolding from a fellow employee.; 5. History Reset - (Sam) resets his history after jerking off.; 6. Corporal Punishment - Many military men get rank changes.; 7. Secrets of the Pyramids - Talking pyramids gossip about various other wonders of the world.; 8. Video That Makes You Gay - Sam makes a video that allegedly makes the viewer gay and tries to convince Trevor to watch it.
48	8	"WKUK Ep. 48"	Zach Cregger & Trevor Moore	Trevor Moore (Head Writer), Sam Brown, Zach Cregger, Darren Trumeter & Timmy Williams	July 30, 2010
1. Valentines Day - (Trevor) is caught masturbating to baby pictures when his wife (Darren) walks in.; 2. A Simple Chore - Michael Moore (Sam) makes a documentary about how his wife (Zach) did not do the dishes.; 3. Stock Watch - (Trevor), (Darren), and (Sam) make an ad for a new book that supposedly helps you in the stock market.; 4. Chad's Rad (Brian the Faggot) - Chad (Zach) makes a video about a fellow classmate (Timmy) for a school project.; 5. Pun Army - Police officers (WKUK) make various puns before raiding a zoo.; 6. History Network - (Trevor) shows his new pilot to the History Network.; 7. Astronaut Pranks - Some astronauts try to play a prank on mission control.; 8. Hunting Housecats - Mini-documentary about two hunters who hunt housecats.
49	9	"WKUK Ep. 49"	Zach Cregger & Trevor Moore	Trevor Moore (Head Writer), Sam Brown, Zach Cregger, Darren Trumeter & Timmy Williams	August 6, 2010
1. Babe Magnet - (Trevor) and (Darren) make a machine that attracts babes (magnetically).; 2. Hell's Kitchen - Satan (Zach) orders his chefs (Timmy, Darren, and Trevor) to cook disgusting food.; 3. Honey I'm In Therapy - (Sam) vents about his childhood to his therapist (Zach).; 4. One of You Is - A policeman (Zach) tries to expose some unwelcome guests on a futuristic space colony where only humans (not cyborgs and ghosts) are permitted.; 5. Freaky Thursday - Mr. Peterson (Trevor) convinces his son's (Darren) girlfriend (Zach) that he and his son switched bodies.; 6. Gay Football - Various scenes (press conference and locker room) from the Gay Football League are shown.; 7. Genetic Pigs - Dr. Scientist (Darren) develops a new kind of pig that maximizes meat production.
50	10	"WKUK Ep. 50"	Zach Cregger & Trevor Moore	Trevor Moore (Head Writer), Sam Brown, Zach Cregger, Darren Trumeter & Timmy Williams	August 13, 2010
1. Halloweiner - Various schoolchildren show off their Halloween costumes to the class, only for the teacher (Timmy) to send both Jacob (Darren) and Brian (Sam) to the principal's office for swearing, although they insist they can because they are a pirate and a cowboy, respectively. The teacher informs student Taylor (Trevor), who is dressed as a clown, that he is not allowed to swear in character even though it's Halloween. Taylor accepts, but gets sent to the principal's office for masturbating in front of the class. Taylor insists, "What? I'm a clown!" 2. Landmine Factory - (Zach) shows (Trevor) the ropes at the landmine factory.; 3. The Pope - The new pope (Trevor) is shown a video made by the old pope (Timmy).; 4. Animals Anonymous - A meeting at the Animal Lovers Anonymous club.; 5. Job Interview Mess Up - (Zach) shows the viewer what not to do at a job interview played out by (Trevor) and (Darren).; 6. First Person Shooter - The WKUK plays a first person shooter game and has some troubles...; 7. Things We Need - The WKUK tells the audience what items they need for future sketches.

== Season 5 (2011) ==
No. overall	No. in season	Title	Directed by	Written by	Original release date
51	1	"WKUK Ep. 51"	Zach Cregger & Trevor Moore	Trevor Moore (Head Writer), Sam Brown, Zach Cregger, Darren Trumeter & Timmy Williams	April 15, 2011
1. Baked Beans - (Timmy) works at a call center.; 2. Little Hitler - In this black-and-white sitcom, young Adolf Hitler is a local community hero.; 3. Songs of Olden Times - (Trevor) serenades the audience with songs featuring outdated social norms.; 4. War Letter - As a US soldier in Vietnam bleeds out, he writes a letter to his wife.; 5. Finger Ring Friends - Super powered finger rings have never been so fun.; 6. Civil War on Drugs Part 1 - In this multi-part series, (Sam) and (Trevor) learn about marijuana in the antebellum south.
52	2	"WKUK Ep. 52"	Zach Cregger & Trevor Moore	Trevor Moore (Head Writer), Sam Brown, Zach Cregger, Darren Trumeter & Timmy Williams	April 22, 2011
1. Slow Mo Squirrel - Trevor, Sam, and Darren are interrupted by a squirrel jumping into their car.; 2. Wedding Flip Flop - (Sam) discusses whether or not he should marry his girlfriend with (Darren).; 3. Ocean 2.0 - A tragic oil spill is actually an exciting new time in the planet's ecosystem - welcome to Ocean 2.0!; 4. Anne Frank - A soldier (Sam) discovers a young girl's private diary and decides to sell it.; 5. First Date - A woman (Darren) is on a first date at a restaurant when her date (Zach) considers ordering dog poop.; 6. Old Folks Home - (Trevor) sings a hip-hop song about how he hated having to visit his grandmother's nursing home, until he found out how many drugs the seniors are prescribed.; 7. Civil War on Drugs Part 2 - In this multi-part series, the Civil War officially begins and Sam and Trevor mistakenly believe marijuana has been made illegal.
53	3	"WKUK Ep. 53"	Zach Cregger & Trevor Moore	Trevor Moore (Head Writer), Sam Brown, Zach Cregger, Darren Trumeter & Timmy Williams	April 29, 2011
1. The Jizzle - A parody of the ShamWow infomercial where pitchman Kyle (Trevor) advertises a rag named the Jizzle - specially designed to clean up semen.; 2. John Williams - John Williams (Trevor) spends his day singing his music.; 3. Ants - A father (Trevor) tries to discipline his family, but they keep escaping his reprimands by pretending that they're being carried away by ants.; 4. Darren and the Giraffe - The Whitest Kids U' Know are filming Darren in front of a green screen. They tell him they will edit a giraffe under him, but instead edit a mostly naked man under him.; 5. Herpes Commercial - An infomercial for a herpes product called Vesocream that can be used to trick partners into thinking the user does not have herpes.; 6. Bikini Day - Two children (Darren and Timmy) inform their father (Trevor) that it's bikini day at the zoo, and that they put bikinis on the animals. He discovers that they were tricking him into an intervention.; 7. Civil War on Drugs Part 3 - In this multi-part series, Sam and Trevor organize a demonstration to legalize marijuana. What they don't realize is that they organized the demonstration on the exact day and location as the Battle of Bull Run.
54	4	"WKUK Ep. 54"	Zach Cregger & Trevor Moore	Trevor Moore (Head Writer), Sam Brown, Zach Cregger, Darren Trumeter & Timmy Williams	May 6, 2011
1. Firetruck Pullover - (Sam) gets pulled over by a firetruck. The firefighter (Darren) informs him that his car is on fire.; 2. Spanking Dads - Dads discuss their increasingly violent acts of domestic violence.; 3. Careful Commandos - Some S.W.A.T. commandos discuss their raid plan, where they will inform each other every time one of the criminals points a gun at them. Meanwhile, the criminals make a similar plan.; 4. MacDougal - The pub MacDougal's is having a Lady's Night, where ladies drink free -- and Black Night, where black people drink half off... and White Night, where white people drink half off.; 5. Teachers' Union - A group of teachers invent school.; 6. Didgeridoo - Saul Rosenberg (Timmy) has a didgeridoo album.; 7. Digging People Up - Earl Becker (Trevor) loses his hardware store and threatens to dig up people's family members' corpses until they send him money.; 8. Civil War on Drugs Part 4 - In this multi-part series, Sam and Trevor enlist in the Confederacy, believing they're fighting for the legalization of marijuana.
55	5	"WKUK Ep. 55"	Zach Cregger & Trevor Moore	Trevor Moore (Head Writer), Sam Brown, Zach Cregger, Darren Trumeter & Timmy Williams	May 13, 2011
1. Black Light - Young Billy (Timmy) gets a new blacklight for his room. He does not realize what the blacklight will reveal.; 2. Nic-O-Dick - A commercial for a nicotine delivery device meant to cure people's nicotine addictions via its phallic shape and its usage being resemblant of oral sex.; 3. Stork Factory - A worker in a baby factory named Doug (Trevor) keeps sending babies to overpopulated places and to mothers that can't afford babies. When one of his higher-ups (Sam) confronts him about this behavior, he begins killing babies.; 4. Nerf Nuke - Nerf releases its most powerful toy yet -- the Nerf Nuke. Kids buy them to ensure their place as a neighborhood superpower.; 5. Civil War on Drugs Part 5 - In this multi-part series, Sam and Trevor get acquainted with their company, who all almost immediately die in battle. Sam and Trevor's photos are taken in battle, and they begin to become known across the nation as war heroes.
56	6	"WKUK Ep. 56"	Zach Cregger & Trevor Moore	Trevor Moore (Head Writer), Sam Brown, Zach Cregger, Darren Trumeter & Timmy Williams	May 20, 2011
1. God Wants You to Wear a Hat - (Trevor) sings a song about the fact that most major religions involve some kind of special hat, and this must mean that God wants you to wear a hat.; 2. Dad Will Take Care of It - A father (Trevor) complains that his family expects him to do all the work, even as his family offers to do work for him.; 3. Zombie Press Conference - A spokesman for the Pentagon (Zach) updates the nation on the state of the zombie apocalypse: it has been discovered that zombies will eventually turn back into humans. Despite this fact, those that mistakenly killed zombies before they turned back will not be tried for murder.; 4. Bad Drivers - A student driver will not break for people having a picnic.; 5. Hot Sister - A father (Trevor) and his son (Darren) have discovered that one of their family members has gotten hot.; 6. Milfy Mom - Billy (Timmy) is chatting with an online friend when his mom (Sam) walks in the room. She sees the chat and misunderstands the word "MILF", believing it to be a compliment, until Billy is forced to explain it to her.; 7. Making Animals Kiss - A TV show makes animals kiss.; 8. Civil War on Drugs Part 6 - In this multi-part series, Sam, Trevor, and their fellow soldier Doug (Darren) camp out. They are then captured by American Indians.
57	7	"WKUK Ep. 57"	Zach Cregger & Trevor Moore	Trevor Moore (Head Writer), Sam Brown, Zach Cregger, Darren Trumeter & Timmy Williams	May 27, 2011
1. Going Home Alone - A man (Trevor) rigs his house with Home Alone-style booby traps, then shoots himself, but not before calling 911 to inform them that he is about to kill himself.; 2. Liquor Store Robbery - Homeless Joe (Zach) holds a businessman (Darren) at gunpoint and asks him for ridiculous requests.; 3. Pledge of Allegiance - The Pledge of Allegiance is a lot more unsettling than you remember.; 4. Dead Teacher - When (Sam)'s attempt to kill his teacher (Trevor) fails, he congratulates him for figuring out it was him who tried to kill him by giving him a drink, but the drink was poison and kills him. This causes (Timmy) to start shooting at (Sam) and everyone starts shooting at each other until someone eventually explodes the school.; 5. Escape Artist - A local escape artist has been underwater for 17 hours straight.; 6. Civil War on Drugs Part 7 - In this multi-part series, the tribe that captured Sam, Trevor, and Doug throw a frat party and give Sam and Trevor peyote. The two of them ambush Ulysses S. Grant while high.
58	8	"WKUK Ep. 58"	Zach Cregger & Trevor Moore	Trevor Moore (Head Writer), Sam Brown, Zach Cregger, Darren Trumeter & Timmy Williams	June 3, 2011
1. Timmy Future - (Timmy) invents a time machine and accidentally erases himself from existence.; 2. Baby Traits - A couple (Trevor and Zach) learn that through modern medical science, they can choose individual genetic traits of their baby. The decisions get difficult when they're asked to choose a race, sexual orientation, and disability status by a doctor who's black, gay, and missing a leg.; 3. 1000 Dice - A commercial for the board game Crazy Chase, which contains 1000 dice.; 4. Bill's Back from Vietnam - Bill is back from Vietnam, and he's much more Vietnamese than his friends remember.; 5. Horse Announcer - An announcer lists ridiculous horse names.; 6. Civil War on Drugs Part 8 - In this multi-part series, Sam and Trevor talk with Ulysses S. Grant (Zach) and become sympathetic to the Union.
59	9	"WKUK Ep. 59"	Zach Cregger & Trevor Moore	Trevor Moore (Head Writer), Sam Brown, Zach Cregger, Darren Trumeter & Timmy Williams	June 10, 2011
1. Worst Orchestra - A narrator (Trevor) lists the worst orchestras of all time, only to trash talk Philadelphia Philharmonic for the New York Philharmonic.; 2. Come Down Here - Jason (Trevor) discusses with his mom (Darren) the fact that there's semen all over his yard sale boxes.; 3. Spaghettio's - A man (Trevor) discovers Spaghettio's in his blood transfusion.; 4. Homeless Show - A show discusses how homeless people can live better. It does not get good ratings.; 5. Joe Has Syphilis - Joe (Zach) tells his ex-girlfriends about his syphilis diagnosis. Little do they know that he does not have syphilis.; 6. Cactus Wasp - A man covered in glitter (Zach) and his clown wife (Darren) have an important discussion about abortion.; 7. Inappropriate Dinner Conversation - (Trevor) and (Sam) try to have dinner, but Sam keeps saying inappropriate things.; 8. Civil War on Drugs Part 9 - In this multi-part series, Sam and Trevor avoid execution by giving General Grant important information about the Confederacy, switching sides to the Union.
60	10	"WKUK Ep. 60"	Zach Cregger & Trevor Moore	Trevor Moore (Head Writer), Sam Brown, Zach Cregger, Darren Trumeter & Timmy Williams	June 17, 2011
1. Mom Phone - (Sam) picks up the phone for his mom (Timmy), but she doesn't hear him.; 2. It Was Pretty Good - The evening news loses a long-time reporter and decides to replace her with several young, attractive people. The reporter Skyler "Scooby" Jensen (Trevor) reports on the Republican debate -- it was pretty good.; 3. Sophomores - Carla (Timmy) comes out as a lesbian to her parents, who believe it's just a phase. Her twin brother Timmy (Darren) comes out as gay, and they threaten to disown him.; 4. Civil War on Drugs Part 10 - In the conclusion to this multi-part series, Sam and Trevor beat the Confederacy and end the Civil War, discovering that the war was about slavery and that marijuana was legal the entire time.
