= Poyser (surname) =

Poyser is a surname. Notable people with the surname include:

- Brian Poyser (died 2009), British actor
- Bryan Poyser (born 1975), American film director and screenwriter
- Delroy Poyser (1962–2019), Jamaican long jumper
- George Poyser (1910–1995), British football player and manager
- George Poyser (politician) (1915–1986), Australian politician
- James Poyser (born 1967), British-born American multi-instrumentalist, songwriter, pianist and music producer
- John Rigby Poyser (1872-1954), British architect
- Victoria Poyser (born 1949), American artist

== See also ==
- T. & A. D. Poyser, ornithological publishers
