= Miss March =

2009 film by Trevor Moore and Zach Cregger

- Theatrical release poster
- Directed by: Trevor Moore; Zach Cregger
- Screenplay by: Trevor Moore; Zach Cregger
- Story by: Dennis Haggerty; Ryan Homchick; Thomas Mimms
- Produced by: Tom Jacobson; Vincent Cirrincione
- Starring: Zach Cregger; Trevor Moore; Craig Robinson
- Cinematography: Anthony B. Richmond
- Edited by: Tim Mirkovich
- Music by: Jeff Cardoni
- Production companies: Fox Atomic; Jacobson Company; Alta Loma Entertainment
- Distributed by: Fox Searchlight Pictures
- Release date: March 13, 2009
- Running time: 90 minutes Unrated version: 94 minutes
- Country: United States
- Language: English
- Budget: $6 million
- Box office: $4.6 million

Miss March is a 2009 American sex comedy film written, starring, and directed by Trevor Moore and Zach Cregger, members of the comedy troupe The Whitest Kids U' Know, in their filmmaking debut which also marked Moore's first feature film.

The film was released in March 13, 2009, and received overwhelmingly negative reviews from critics. It marks the final on-screen film appearance of Hugh Hefner before his death in 2017.

== Plot ==
Tucker has been a huge fan of the Playboy franchise since finding his friend Eugene's older brother's magazines when he was eight. Eugene and his girlfriend Cindi Whitehall are public speakers. They spend their time speaking to elementary school children about abstinence and sexually transmitted diseases. Eugene also relates what happened to his brother, Craig, who lost his mother and son in a fire and the grief led to him being institutionalized.

Even though Eugene and Cindi preach about abstinence publicly, Cindi tells Eugene she wants to have sex with him for the first time. They plan to have sex at an after prom party that Tucker has invited them to. At the party, Eugene is nervous and Tucker gives him several shots of hard alcohol. Eugene unwittingly heads through the basement door and falls down the steps, winding up in a coma for four years.

Tucker wakes Eugene from his coma by hitting him with a baseball bat, which unfortunately causes Eugene to defecate constantly. They soon discover that Cindi has become the newest Playboy centerfold. Tucker devises a plan to go cross country from South Carolina to the Playboy Mansion and crash Playboy's annual Birthday bash in order to reunite Eugene with his old girlfriend. Tucker's girlfriend, Candace, also begins hunting him down after an incident where he stabbed her after she bit his genitals during an epileptic seizure while performing fellatio.

They are immediately targeted by the local firefighters led by Candace's brother, Rick. The duo loses the tail and the firefighters reach out to other firefighters across the country, placing a bounty on Tucker's head. After accidentally burning down a hotel room, Eugene and Tucker find out that every firefighter in the country are hunting them down.

In Chicago, Tucker runs low on funds due to his incompetent road trip planning and they meet up with their old friend, Phil, who has become a famous rapper with the MC name of Horsedick dot MPEG. They all hop on board his party bus and begin to trek across the country towards the Mansion. On the bus, Tucker is in a bedroom with Crystal, one of Horsedick's women. After bouncing up and down on the bed for Tucker's amusement, she accidentally flies out the open window.

After learning that Cindi slept with Horsedick, Eugene slaps Horsedick and defecates on board, and Tucker and Eugene are thrown out of the bus in the desert and left to walk the rest of the way. Just as it seems like all hope is lost, a car pulls up with two Russian lesbians, Katja and Vonka. The four make a deal where the boys do the driving to Los Angeles while the women are in the back seat having sex.

They make it to the Mansion only to be stopped by bouncers at the door while the lesbians are let in. Candace and the firefighters arrive and are let in, giving Tucker and Eugene the perfect ploy to slip inside. While searching for Cindi, Eugene is suspected of being a stalker and is taken into a secure holding area, but not before being spotted by Cindi. Candace and the firefighters spot Tucker, who flees and hides.

While hiding, Tucker meets Hugh Hefner. Hugh and Tucker have a discussion about Tucker's love issues, and Hugh tells Tucker about the first woman he ever fell in love with. Hefner explains that "there is a bunny in every woman", and that if Tucker can only see the "bunny" in those women, that he's on to something. Hugh soon calls security upon learning that Tucker not only stabbed his girlfriend in the face with a fork, but the fact that firefighters want to kill him.

Back in the holding area, Cindi comes in to see Eugene, who is not too keen on seeing her. Eugene accuses her of abandoning him, but Cindi tells Eugene that the money she made modeling and being a Playboy Bunny was sent to help pay for Eugene's hospital bills after his neglectful father wanted to permanently move him into hospice and let him die. She then pointed out that Tucker was receiving the mail, which sparked some ire in Eugene. Shortly after, both guys are thrown out of the Mansion.

Tucker is handed to the firefighters to be beheaded and Tucker apologizes to Candace, begging for a second chance with her. She decides to give him another shot, which infuriates Rick and his fire crew. Eugene is handed over to Horsedick dot MPEG, who promised to "rip Eugene's face off". After Cindi reveals to everyone outside that Horsedick was born without genitals, his right-hand man realizes that he's never seen MPEG in action with a woman.

At that moment, his crew pulls down his pants, showing nothing but two straws where his genitals should be. Horsedick leaves embarrassed and ashamed, and after Eugene and Cindi make up, Hefner lets everyone back in. Eugene and Tucker find themselves in the Mansion's kitchen, and Eugene tells Tucker that Cindi is waiting upstairs for him. They finally have sex, where Eugene "overexerts" himself.

During the credits, Eugene's doctor is attempting to resuscitate a coma with a baseball bat the same way Tucker did Eugene. The coma patient turned out to be Crystal, who woke up before the doctor struck her, promising to kill Tucker.

== Cast ==
- Zach Cregger as Eugene Pratt, A young male who woke up from a 4 year coma to learn his girlfriend is a Playboy centerfold
  - Slade Austin Pierce as Young Eugene
- Trevor Moore as Tucker Cleigh, Eugene's friend who is obsessed with Playboy
  - Remy Thorne as Young Tucker
- Craig Robinson as Phil aka "Horsedick Dot MPEG", an old high school classmate turned successful rapper
- Raquel Alessi as Cindi Whitehall, Eugene's girlfriend, now a Playmate
- Molly Stanton as Candace, Tucker's girlfriend, who suffers from extreme epilepsy
- Cedric Yarbrough as Doctor
- Hugh M. Hefner as Himself
- Geoff Meed as Rick, Candace's older brother who is a firefigther
- Sara Jean Underwood as Herself
- Betsy Rue as Strawberrius
- Carla Jimenez as Nurse Juanita, a nurse attending to Eugene
- Alexis Raben as Katja, one of the Russian lesbians giving Eugene and Tucker a lift to the Playboy Mansion
- Eve Mauro as Vonka, one of the Russian lesbians giving Eugene and Tucker a lift to the Playboy Mansion
- Tanjareen Martin as Crystal, one of Horsedick's girls
- Alex Donnelley as Mrs. Whitehall
- Jen Taylor as Customs Official
- Anthony Jeselnik as Director

== Production ==
Trevor Moore and Zach Cregger were offered the script of Miss March by Fox, and although not initially interested, the idea held some appeal and they took it on as a writing exercise and made it their own. They developed the project intentionally without the involvement of Playboy.

Robert Wagner was originally cast as Hugh Hefner and according to Moore and Cregger, he did a great job, but audiences at test screenings did not react positively; audiences already familiar with Hefner from the television series The Girls Next Door did not connect with Wagner. "Tails between their legs," Moore and Cregger took the film to Playboy. Fortunately, Hefner liked what he saw and agreed to take part, as well as getting 2007 Playmate of the Year Sara Jean Underwood to cameo in the film.

== Reception ==
=== Critical response ===
On the review aggregator website Rotten Tomatoes, 5% of 79 critics' reviews are positive, with an average rating of 2.9/10. The website's consensus reads: "Even by the modest standards of the teen sex comedy genre, the crass, poorly-made Miss March misses the mark." Metacritic, which uses a weighted average, assigned the film a score of 7 out of 100, based on 15 critics, indicating "overwhelming dislike".

James Berardinelli, an online film critic, wrote about the film, saying, "This is bad. Not bad in a way that it might be fun to see when inebriated. Bad in a way from which only death provides immunity. Forget waterboarding – just show Guantanamo detainees Miss March and they'll say anything." The A.V. Club critic Nathan Rabin said that Craig Robinson's performance "is all that stands between Miss March and complete worthlessness", complaining about the leads and the movie being "misanthropic, smutty, and smug".

Tom O'Neil, a critic for the Los Angeles Times, questioned as to whether the film could be the worst of 2009. CNN critic Tom Charity declared the film the worst of 2009.

For his performance in the film, Playboy founder Hugh Hefner was nominated for a Razzie Award for "worst supporting actor".

=== Box office ===
On Miss March's opening weekend, the film grossed $2.4 million, which put the film in 10th place of all movies that weekend. The film grossed $4.54 million at the box office in the United States and Canada.

=== Home video ===
The film was released on both Blu-ray and DVD on July 28, 2009.

=== Retrospective ===
Moore and Cregger talked about the film several times on their weekly Twitch livestreams. Cregger has stated he believes they did the best they could with the idea, and although some scenes work, the film was their first attempt at making a movie. Despite that, he is still relatively critical of the final product. Moore, on the other hand, stood by the movie, comparing it to their sketch group The Whitest Kids U' Know television series "some parts are funny, some parts aren't." The directors still had a sense of humor about the poor response as they would read the poor reviews and sarcastically remark about the film's quality on livestream.
