= Standoff (TV series) =

- Created by: Craig Silverstein
- Starring: Ron Livingston; Rosemarie DeWitt; Gina Torres; Michael Cudlitz; Raquel Alessi; José Pablo Cantillo
- Opening theme: "Late Nights and Street Fights" by Dirty Vegas
- Country of origin: United States
- Original language: English
- No. of seasons: 1
- No. of episodes: 18

Production
- Executive producers: Craig Silverstein; Glen Mazzara
- Running time: 43 minutes
- Production companies: Sesfonstein Productions; 20th Century Fox Television

Original release
- Network: Fox
- Release: September 5, 2006 – July 20, 2007

Standoff is an American drama television series that premiered on the Fox network on September 5, 2006. Created by Craig Silverstein, the series focused on an FBI Crisis Negotiation Unit whose members negotiated hostage situations and shared relationships. The show was produced by Sesfonstein Productions and 20th Century Fox Television and its executive producers were Craig Silverstein, Tim Story, and Glen Mazzara. A total of 18 episodes were produced and the series completed its original run on July 20, 2007.

== Plot ==
The premise of the show was set up in the opening scene of the series pilot. In an attempt to connect with the hostage-taker, Matt Flannery (Ron Livingston), a negotiator for the FBI, reveals to him and his colleagues who are listening to his conversation, that he has been sleeping with his partner, Emily Lehman (Rosemarie DeWitt). Their supervisor Cheryl Carrera (Gina Torres) is concerned about how their relationship will affect their jobs. Each episode revolves around the main plot of a hostage situation and the subplot of Matt and Emily's relationship. In the hostage situation, the FBI Crisis Negotiation Unit is typically called upon to deal with the hostage-taker.

== Cast and characters ==
Standoff cast (left to right): Cheryl Carrera (Gina Torres), Matt Flannery (Ron Livingston), Duff Gonzalez (Jose Pablo Cantillo), Emily Lehman (Rosemarie DeWitt), Lia Mathers (Raquel Alessi), and Frank Rogers (Michael Cudlitz)

Although the series has six main characters, Matt Flannery and Emily Lehman are considered to be the protagonists of the series as a subplot concerning their relationship is featured in each episode.

- Matt Flannery (played by Ron Livingston) is a senior negotiator for the FBI Crisis Negotiation Unit at the bureau's Los Angeles field office. He is partnered with Emily Lehman, who is also his lover. He was born in Van Nuys, California and attended the University of California, Santa Barbara, where he obtained a Bachelor of Science in General Studies. Prior to joining the FBI, he worked as a police detective in the Violent Crimes Section of the Simi Valley Police Department and as a crisis negotiator of the department.
- Emily Lehman (played by Rosemarie DeWitt) is a senior negotiator for the Crisis Negotiation Unit at the Los Angeles field office of the Federal Bureau of Investigation. She is partnered with Matt Flannery, who is also her lover. She was born in Albany, New York and educated at Cornell University, where she graduated with Bachelor of Arts in psychology. She then attained her master's degree in psychology and her Ph.D in criminal psychology and forensic psychology from Princeton University. Prior to working at the Los Angeles field office of the FBI, Emily worked at the Phoenix field office in the Criminal Investigative Division.
- Cheryl Carrera (played by Gina Torres) is the supervisory special agent in charge of the Crisis Negotiation Unit at the Los Angeles field office of the Federal Bureau of Investigation. She was Matt's partner in crisis negotiation before she was promoted. She was born in Brooklyn, New York to a Cuban father and attended the City University of New York, where she graduated with Bachelor of Science in political science. She later attended Columbia University, where she obtained her master's degree in international relations and a Ph.D. degree in juridical science. Prior to working with the FBI, she was an assistant district attorney in New York City.
- Frank Rogers (played by Michael Cudlitz) is an FBI special agent and the head of the Special Weapons and Tactics team at the Los Angeles field office of the Federal Bureau of Investigation. He was born in Detroit, Michigan. Before entering the FBI, Rogers was trained at the U.S. Army Combat Training Center and the U.S. Army Ranger School. He served in the Gulf War with the 75th Ranger Regiment. After joining the FBI, he worked at the Dallas Field Office, where he was part of the field office's SWAT team.
- Lia Mathers (played by Raquel Alessi) is an FBI special agent and an intelligence analyst for the Crisis Negotiation Unit at the Los Angeles field office of the Federal Bureau of Investigation. She was born in Seattle, Washington and educated at the California Institute of Technology, where she graduated with a Bachelor of Science in Advanced Computer Studies. She then attended the FBI Academy and received Professional Support Training from the Investigative Computer Unit.
- Duff Gonzalez (played by José Pablo Cantillo) is an FBI special agent and a member of the SWAT team at the Los Angeles field office of the Federal Bureau of Investigation. He was born in East Los Angeles, California and obtained a Bachelor of Science in General Studies from California State University, Fullerton. Before joining the FBI, Duff was formerly a member of the Los Angeles Police Department's SWAT Team.

== Production ==
=== Broadcast history ===
Although the show lost more than half of its audience after its premiere, Fox ordered 6 more episodes in November 2006, bringing the total number of episodes to 18 for the season. The show was put on hiatus in December 2006 and was scheduled to return on March 30, 2007 before being pushed back to April 6, 2007. The return date was changed again to June 8, 2007 and was allocated to the 9:00 pm Friday night timeslot. By May 2007, it was reported that Fox canceled the series.

Between episodes 4 and 5, a minor change was made to the intro sequence, so that the silhouette of Ron Livingston's character, which appears back-to-back with that of Rosemarie DeWitt in the show's logo, is depicted with a less pronounced backside starting from the fifth episode onward.

The series aired in the coveted 8:30 PM (then 9:30 PM) Monday night timeslot on Australia's Seven Network over the 2006-07 summer 'non-ratings' period. When that period ended, the show was shelved until July–September 2007 when it finished its run in the 10:30 PM (then 11:30 PM) Tuesday timeslot.

== Episodes ==
No.	Title	Directed by	Written by	Original release date	Prod. code	Viewers (millions) )
1	"Pilot"	Tim Story	Craig Silverstein	September 5, 2006	1AMH79	13.6
Matt Flannery and Emily Lehman, two FBI agents specialized in crisis negotiation, are negotiating with a television soap opera actor who is about to lose custody of his sons. After it is resolved, they are sent to negotiate with the son of a state senator who takes hostages inside of a coffee shop using a home-made suicide bomber vest. On the night of its premiere in the Tuesday at 9:00 pm ET timeslot, the episode attracted 13.8 million viewers with 9.6% household rating and 14% household share. It also obtained the largest audience from the key demographic of 18- to 49-year-old viewers with a 4.7% rating.
2	"Circling"	Brad Turner	Craig Silverstein	September 12, 2006	1AMH01	9
After a recent airplane collision, an air traffic controller is held responsible. He loses his temper and takes control of the air traffic control station in an attempt to clear his name.
3	"Shanghai'd"	David Straiton	David Levinson	September 19, 2006	1AMH02	7.8
What seems to be a textbook child kidnapping becomes a tangled mess when it is revealed that the victim is the daughter of David Lau -an Asian crime lord who is currently under FBI investigation.
4	"Partners in Crime"	David Straiton	Joy Kecken	September 26, 2006	1AMH04	8
Following a failed bank robbery which resulted in a hostage situation, Emily is taken hostage by the two bank robbers. Matt uses his people skills to negotiate with the robbers.
5	"Life Support"	Glen Mazzara	Glen Mazzara & Linda Gase	October 3, 2006	1AMH05	4.9
A seventeen-year-old boy takes hostages in a hospital operating room, demanding Dr. Khoury be found so that he can operate on his terminally ill sister. Matt and Emily attempt to save the hostages and help the boy.
6	"One Shot Stop"	Terrence O'Hara	Juan Carlos Coto	November 7, 2006	1AMH07	5.4
After a sniper kills several people at random, the CNU seeks the suspect's hideout and believe they've caught him. When the suspect turns out to be a copycat and a police captain is shot, Matt and Emily work with Frank and Duff to find the real sniper before anyone else gets hurt. Inspired by the D.C. sniper attacks
7	"Man of Steele"	Steve Gomer	Adam Targum	November 14, 2006	1AMH06	4.6
After learning that an illegal adoption agreement made between himself and a woman was a fraud, a man takes the woman's baby and the babysitter hostage at her home. When he makes contact with a radio personality, Matt and Emily are forced to negotiate live on the air.
8	"Heroine"	Jonathan Glassner	Stacy Rukeyser	November 21, 2006	1AMH08	4.8
The victim of Matt and Emily's hostage negotiation case becomes the target of a stalker. Although Emily doubts the woman's claims due to her feelings for Matt, Matt is determined to protect the woman.
9	"Peer Group"	Robert Duncan McNeill	Daniel Knauf	November 28, 2006	1AMH09	5.7
A father turns to CNU to prevent a hostage situation after finding his teenage son's notebook full of violent images, but Matt and Emily arrive at the school after the hostage situation begins. The situation turns when one of the four gunmen shoots a hostage and takes his three comrades hostage as well.
10	"Accidental Negotiator"	Craig Ross, Jr.	Daniel Knauf	December 5, 2006	1AMH03	6.1
A woman, who is recently fired from a credit union, is wrangled into negotiating with a man who has taken her former co-workers hostage.
11	"Borderline"	Tim Story	Juan Carlos Coto & Linda Gase	December 12, 2006	1AMH10	5.1
Matt and Emily's negotiation with a drug lord goes awry when he escapes. When they finally find him in an isolated location in Mexico, Matt and Emily are stranded with two DEA agents and the fugitive after his associates arrived to save him.
12	"No Strings"	Jonathan Glassner	Chris Black & Daniel Knauf	June 8, 2007	1AMH13	3.7
Matt and Emily negotiate with a U.S. Customs Agent at San Pedro who takes his co-workers hostage after apparently trying to smuggle in a crate full of illegal immigrants. Meanwhile, Emily contemplates accepting a one-year special assignment that would mean being separated from Matt and is disturbed by his response.
13	"Backfire"	Jonathan Glassner	Craig Silverstein	June 15, 2007	1AMH11	3.5
Matt and Emily negotiate with two armed bank robbers who take a subway full of hostages. During the negotiation Matt is pulled away to deal with an hostage taker who Matt has met and successfully negotiated with, who has taken a therapist and the therapist's husband hostage. Matt talks the man who believes that an Evil Psychic Agent has taken the form of the therapist husband.
14	"Road Trip"	John Badham	Adam Targum & Juan Carlos Coto	June 22, 2007	1AMH12	3.4
As Darah, daughter of polygamous cult leader Warren Keegan (based on disgraced FLDS cult leader Warren Jeffs), attempts to escape from her father and reunite with her sister, she is abducted by Warren and his three wives. Warren Keegan is wanted by the FBI after he assaulted a federal officer. By tracking the satellite dish Warren installed on his recreational vehicle, Matt and Emily are able to locate the hostage and her hostage takers. They find out from Darah's sister, who was Warren's wife before she escaped, that Warren believes that he could be saved from the apocalypse if he had four wives. However, Warren's actual reasons behind his marriages are unknown to Matt and Emily, and Warren's wives.
15	"Lie to Me"	Michael Grossman	Craig Silverstein	June 29, 2007	1AMH15	3.2
A young boy is kidnapped from his parents at a fair and used as a ploy to obtain the attention of Emily after the hostage-taker sends a videotape to the media, showing the boy with a sign "Emily Lehman did this". It becomes evident that the hostage-taker is looking for revenge as he uses the media to embarrass and humiliate Emily. He gives Emily and Matt a 24-hour deadline to find the boy. When the hostage-taker reveals more personal details about Emily's past, Emily decides to visit her sister, Allison, who is incarcerated at a federal prison. Allison refuses to help Emily, who had refused to use her FBI position to help her get out of her prison sentence.
16	"Ex-Factor"	Jonathan Glassner	Juan Carlos Coto	July 6, 2007	1AMH16	3.3
The key witness in a federal money-laundering case and his wife are kidnapped and held hostage during the trial. Knowing the witness' value to the prosecution, the hostage-taker demands a $2 million ransom from the federal government. Matt and Emily, under Cheryl's leadership, join forces with Cheryl's ex-boyfriend, Sam, who is the FBI agent working on the case, to resolve the crisis.
17	"Kids in the Hall"	David Straiton	Sarah Watson	July 13, 2007	1AMH17	3
A hostage situation arises at Dunne Hill Juvenile Detention Center when its inmates take several of the guards hostage. However, the teenage inmates' intention is not to escape from prison but to obtain the attention of the Senator to request the prison to be remained open thereby avoiding transfer to a Supermax facility. After Matt risks his job to help the kids Matt and Emily decide its best if they see other people.
18	"Severance"	Jesse Bochco	Craig Silverstein	July 20, 2007	1AMH18	2.9
The CNU resolves a hostage situation when a corporate executive takes 16 hostages in the company's boardroom. A second crisis involves a domestic situation that results in Matt and Emily questioning a decision they had made during the standoff. The second crisis soon turns into another crisis when the wife of the second crisis' hostage taker holds her husbands mother hostage in exchange for her "lover" who she supposedly was having an affair with. Matt is assigned to one scene and Emily who is no longer on the same hostage negotiating team takes the other as they attempt to solve both conflicts.

== International broadcasting ==
Country / Region	Network(s)	Aired	Notes
United States	Fox	September 5, 2006— June 8, 2007	Tuesday 9:00pm (episodes 1-11); Friday 9:00pm (episodes 12-18)
Australia	Seven Network		
Brazil	Fox (Brazil)	starting January 2007	Monday at 11/12
Belgium	RTL-TVI	starting November 14, 2008	Sunday at 20:20
France	TF6		
Italy	Italia 1	starting August 8, 2008	concluded January 9, 2009
Mexico	FOX Latin America	starting November 2006	Saturday at 6:00/7:00 in Hispanic American Spanish version
Netherlands	RTL 4		Mondays at 23:30
Germany	VOX		Mondays at 11/12
Poland	POLSAT	starting May 19, 2011	
Portugal	FOX Portugal	starting July 2007	
Spain	Telecinco	starting November 2006	
Lithuania	TV3, TV6	starting November 25, 2008	Tuesday at 22:00
Slovakia	JOJ	2009	
Sweden	TV3		
Hungary	RTL Klub	starting February 3, 2009	
Russia	TV-3 (Russia)	July 29, 2008	
United Kingdom	Sky One		
