= ImaginAsian =

American media company

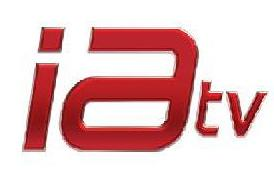
- Type: Broadcast television network
- Country: United States

History
- Launched: August 30, 2004; 21 years ago
- Closed: 2011; 15 years ago

ImaginAsian Entertainment, Inc was an American multimedia company founded by Michael Hong and Augustine Hong and a group of investors that recognized the emerging importance of "all-things Asian." Based in New York City, its main attraction was a television network, iaTV, which premiered in 2004 and which focused on entertainment featuring Korean, Japanese, and South-East Asian content. The channel competed in certain markets with AZN Television until April 2008, when the competing network ceased broadcasting. ImaginAsian itself ceased operations in 2011, selling its channel slot to CJ E&M for broadcast of the world feed of Mnet.

They also operated The ImaginAsian, a renovated movie theater located in Midtown Manhattan that shows only first-run and classic East Asian films, as well as several film festivals per year. The company renovated a second former movie theater in Los Angeles that opened in December 2007, the former Linda Lea Theater, which originally showed Japanese films and served the Little Tokyo area before shuttering in the 1980s.

In addition, past divisions of the company consisted of iaLink, ImaginAsian Entertainment's monthly on-line magazine, which at one point had over ten million subscribers, ImaginAsian Pictures and Home Entertainment, a film and DVD distribution division that released several DVDs of East Asian films and iaTV original shows, and the successful theatrical and DVD release of the Vietnamese American film Journey from the Fall, and iaRadio, a block of radio programming both streamed on-line as well as made available on certain terrestrial stations.

== History ==
In early January 2005, its carriage was extended to Comcast's head-end for Southern California. If viewer demand was high, Comcast would launch the 24-hour feed locally. The channel's first original show was Uncle Morty's Dub Shack.

At the end of 2005, iaTV bought the rights to two KBS dramas, Winter Sonata and Full House. A memorandum of understanding with Korean film production company Sidus was signed in August 2007, enabling the channel to have access to its content library. The MOU also envisioned the company buying a $20 million equity stake in iaTV.

After closure in early 2011, its channel space was replaced by Mnet America.

== List of corporate affiliates ==
- ImaginAsian Entertainment (IAEI) was the corporate parent
- ImaginAsianTV (iaTV) was the television network
- ImaginAsian Radio (iaRadio) was a streaming online radio
- iaLink was an online e-zine
- The ImaginAsian Theater, a movie theater in New York City which is now owned by Phoenix Theatres
- ImaginAsian Pictures was for the creation, distribution, and promotion of films
- ImaginAsian Home Entertainment was the DVD and home video division
- The ImaginAsian Center was the film/event theatre in the Gallery Row area of Los Angeles, California, which opened on December 1, 2007. The Los Angeles center seems to have stopped operations in October 2008, though its web site (https://web.archive.org/web/20090105222531/http://www.theimaginasian.com/la) was still up as of 2009. It was renamed The Downtown Independent.

== Shows aired on ImaginAsian ==
=== Television programs ===
- Asian Charlie's Angels (Taiwanese remake)
- All About Eve
- Bare Beauty
- Bloodhound: Vampire Gigolo
- Comedy Zen
- Couple or Trouble
- Explore Asia
- Extreme Gourmet
- Full House
- Finding My America (original)
- High Fly
- It Started With a Kiss
- Jo Jo New York
- "Johnny Sokko and his Flying Robot"
- Kikay Machine
- Movies for the ImaginAsian (original)
- Pacific Fusion (original)
- Pancrase: Legends of Mixed Martial Arts
- Party Guide for an Urbanite
- Parental Guidance
- Phoenix
- Princess Hours
- Sidestitch
- Sunflower
- Soulmate
- The Great Horror Family
- Tracking Your X-Boyfriend
- Uncle Morty's Dub Shack (original)
- Valley of Love
- White Blouse
- Winter Sonata

=== Eastern Animation ===
==== Japanese ====
- Ayakashi: Samurai Horror Tales
- Black God: The Animation
- Cat's Eye
- Elemental Gelade
- Figure 17
- Gankutsuou: The Count of Monte Cristo
- Gravitation
- Hikaru no Go
- Human Crossing
- Initial D
- Jing: King of Bandits
- Kamichu!
- Kiba
- Kino's Journey
- Kurogane Communication
- Kyo Kara Maoh!
- The Law of Ueki
- Mars Daybreak
- My-HiME
- NieA_7
- Nobody's Boy: Remi
- Paradise Kiss
- Pani Poni Dash!
- Scrapped Princess
- Shingu: Secret of the Stellar Wars
- Super Dimension Century Orguss
- The Twelve Kingdoms
- Wedding Peach

==== Korean ====
- Guardian Fairy Michel
- Hermos: The Green Chariot
- Restol SRS
- Spheres

== List of over-the-air TV channels and cable providers ==
=== Cable/satellite providers ===
- New York, New York – Time Warner Cable Channel 560
- Hudson Valley, New York – Time Warner Cable Channel 560
- Los Angeles, California – Time Warner Cable Channel 157
  - Charter Communications Channel 143
  - Champion Broadband Channel 196 (Arcadia, Monrovia and Pasadena)
- San Francisco, California – Comcast Channel 28
- Princeton, New Jersey – Patriot Media Channel 149
- Houston, Texas – Comcast Channel 241
  - TVMax Channel 109
  - Fision Channel 349
- Dallas, Texas – Time Warner Cable Channel 342
- Fairfax County, Virginia – Cox Communications Channel 465
- Hawaii – Oceanic Time Warner Cable Channel 134

=== Broadcast television stations ===
- Edison, New Jersey – WDVB-CA (Formerly W36AS) Channel 39 (Middlesex, Monmouth, Essex and Union Counties)

== See also ==
- List of United States over-the-air television networks
