= Mars (2024 film) =

2024 film directed by Sevan Najarian

- Directed by: Sevan Najarian
- Written by: Trevor Moore; Zach Cregger; Sam Brown
- Produced by: Kara Welker; Sevan Najarian; Trevor Moore; Zach Cregger; Sam Brown
- Starring: Trevor Moore; Zach Cregger; Sam Brown; Timmy Williams; Darren Trumeter
- Edited by: Sevan Najarian
- Music by: Jason Akana
- Production companies: Midnight Kids Studios Inc.; Whitest Kids Films LLC.
- Distributed by: Synergetic Films
- Release dates: June 6, 2024 (Tribeca Film Festival); February 20, 2026 (Alamo Drafthouse Cinemas)
- Running time: 85 minutes
- Country: United States
- Language: English
- Budget: $300,000

Mars is an American adult animated science fiction comedy film written by Trevor Moore, Zach Cregger, and Sam Brown, directed by Sevan Najarian and starring The Whitest Kids U' Know sketch comedy troupe. The film premiered at the Tribeca Film Festival on June 6, 2024.

== Plot ==
When a ragtag group of misfits — including a young man who ditches his fiancée on their wedding day — embark on a wild space mission to Mars, they quickly discover they have been bamboozled by a billionaire with a hidden agenda. As the absurdity of their predicament unfolds, the eclectic crew must navigate a series of hilarious and unexpected twists and turns.

== Cast ==
- Trevor Moore as:
  - Elron Bronson, a billionaire philanthropist funding an expedition to Mars
  - Cooter, Kyle's drug-addicted best friend
  - Todd Sullivan, a nihilistic yet intelligent middle school teacher and one of the chosen passengers of the Mars mission
  - various others
- Zach Cregger as:
  - Kyle Capshaw, a meek dentist in training, Candace's fiancé, and the last chosen passenger of the Mars mission
  - Marty Wagner, the original chosen passenger for the Mars mission who is replaced by Kyle
  - various others
- Sam Brown as:
  - Peggy Bork, a low-IQ woman raised in isolation and one of the chosen passengers of the Mars mission
  - Dr. Simpson, a dentist and Candace's father
  - various others
- Timmy Williams as:
  - Wimmy Tilliams, a devout Christian husband and father of five, and one of the chosen passengers of the Mars mission
  - various others
- Darren Trumeter as:
  - Candace Simpson, Kyle's short-tempered and demanding fiancée, who is also sent to join him on the Mars mission
  - various others

Sara Paxton also provides additional voices.

== Production ==
In July 2012, Trevor Moore revealed on his website that a script for a new Whitest Kids U' Know film was being written. On February 11, 2017, Moore announced via Instagram that the film's script had been completed. Zach Cregger stated that although the troupe wrote other films after their first draft of Mars, they continued to revise it over several years, noting it remained their favorite project and one they never lost interest in. As the story continued to develop, Moore enlisted animator Sevan Najarian to help adapt the script into an animated film.

During the COVID-19 pandemic, the troupe created a shared Twitch account and streamed on a regular basis to crowdfund the film's production budget. At the time of Moore's passing in August 2021, he had recorded all of his dialogue for the film and provided notes on the animatic. In September 2022, Cregger revealed that the film had nearly wrapped production.

== Release ==
In September 2025, it was announced that the film would receive a deluxe Blu-ray release in early 2026 from Whole Grain Pictures, featuring commentary tracks, behind the scenes footage, and deleted scenes. In February 2026, Mars screened at select Alamo Drafthouse theaters, with the Whitest Kids U' Know and Najarian attending for exclusive Q&A sessions.
