= Love & Air Sex =

2013 American film by Bryan Poyser

- Film poster
- Directed by: Bryan Poyser
- Written by: Bryan Poyser; David DeGrow Shotwell; Steven Walters
- Produced by: Megan Gilbride; Trace Sheehan
- Starring: Ashley Bell; Zach Cregger; Sara Paxton; Michael Stahl-David; Addison Timlin; Justin Arnold; Marshall Allman
- Cinematography: PJ Raval
- Edited by: Don Swaynos
- Music by: Roanna Gillespie
- Production companies: Anaphrodisiac; Preferred Content; Boomdozer, Inc.
- Distributed by: Tribeca Film (USA); Archstone Distribution (International)
- Release dates: March 10, 2013 (SXSW); February 4, 2014 (VOD)
- Running time: 94 minutes
- Country: United States
- Language: English

Love & Air Sex, formerly known as The Bounceback, is an American romantic comedy film directed by Bryan Poyser and written by Poyser, David DeGrow Shotwell, and Steven Walters. The film stars Sara Paxton, Ashley Bell, Zach Cregger, and Michael Stahl-David. The film premiered at the 2013 SXSW Film Festival and was picked up by Tribeca Film for a U.S. day-and-date release.

== Synopsis ==
Stan (Michael Stahl-David), a depressed struggling filmmaker, flies to Austin for the weekend to "accidentally" meet up with his ex-girlfriend Cathy (Ashley Bell), a med student. He finds their friends, crude, foul-mouthed Jeff (Zach Cregger) and hard-partying Kara (Sara Paxton), in the process of breaking up. To complicate matters, the Air Sex World Championships are in town, Cathy is mooning over a guy named Tim, Tim's obnoxious younger brother Ralph is courting Kara. Stan is attracted to an LA native, Haley, Jeff also finds a new love interest, and Stan's roommates Joe and Redge are underfoot.

== Cast ==
- Ashley Bell as Cathy
- Michael Stahl-David as Stan
- Zach Cregger as Jeff
- Sara Paxton as Kara
- Justin Arnold as Tim
- Marshall Allman as Ralph
- Addison Timlin as Haley
- Zach Green as Joe
- Ashley Spillers as Ellie
- Brian McGuire as Redge
- Jessie Tilton as Sandee/Poke-Hot-Ass, Jeff's new girlfriend

== Production ==
Filming took place in Austin, Texas in May 2012.

== Release ==
The film premiered at the 2013 SXSW Film Festival as "The Bounceback" in the Narrative Spotlight Section on March 10, 2014. In January 2014, the film was acquired by independent distributor Tribeca Film and retitled "Love and Air Sex." The film was released day-and-date, on VOD February 4 and theatrically on February 7, 2014. The theatrical release was accompanied by a ten-city road show featuring live air sex demonstrations and competitions led by comedian Chris Trew. International rights were picked up by Archstone Distribution.

== Reception ==
=== Critical response ===
The film holds a 68% score on review aggregator Rotten Tomatoes, based on 25 reviews with an average rating of 5.8/10.

The film received mixed reviews from critics, with some praise from New York Times critic Stephen Holden for its "cheeky attitude" and "zany vitality", and from the Austin Chronicle. There was lackluster response from both Slant magazine and Roger Ebert. FilmThreat critic Don Simpson wrote, "Poyser's oh-so-frank approach to sexuality goes much further than any Hollywood movie I have ever seen." The film was panned by the New York Daily News.

=== Accolades ===
The film won awards for "Best Writing" at the 2013 Gen Art Film Festival and "Best Ensemble Cast" at the 2013 Napa Valley Film Festival.
