= Zach Cregger =

American actor, comedian, and filmmaker (born 1981)

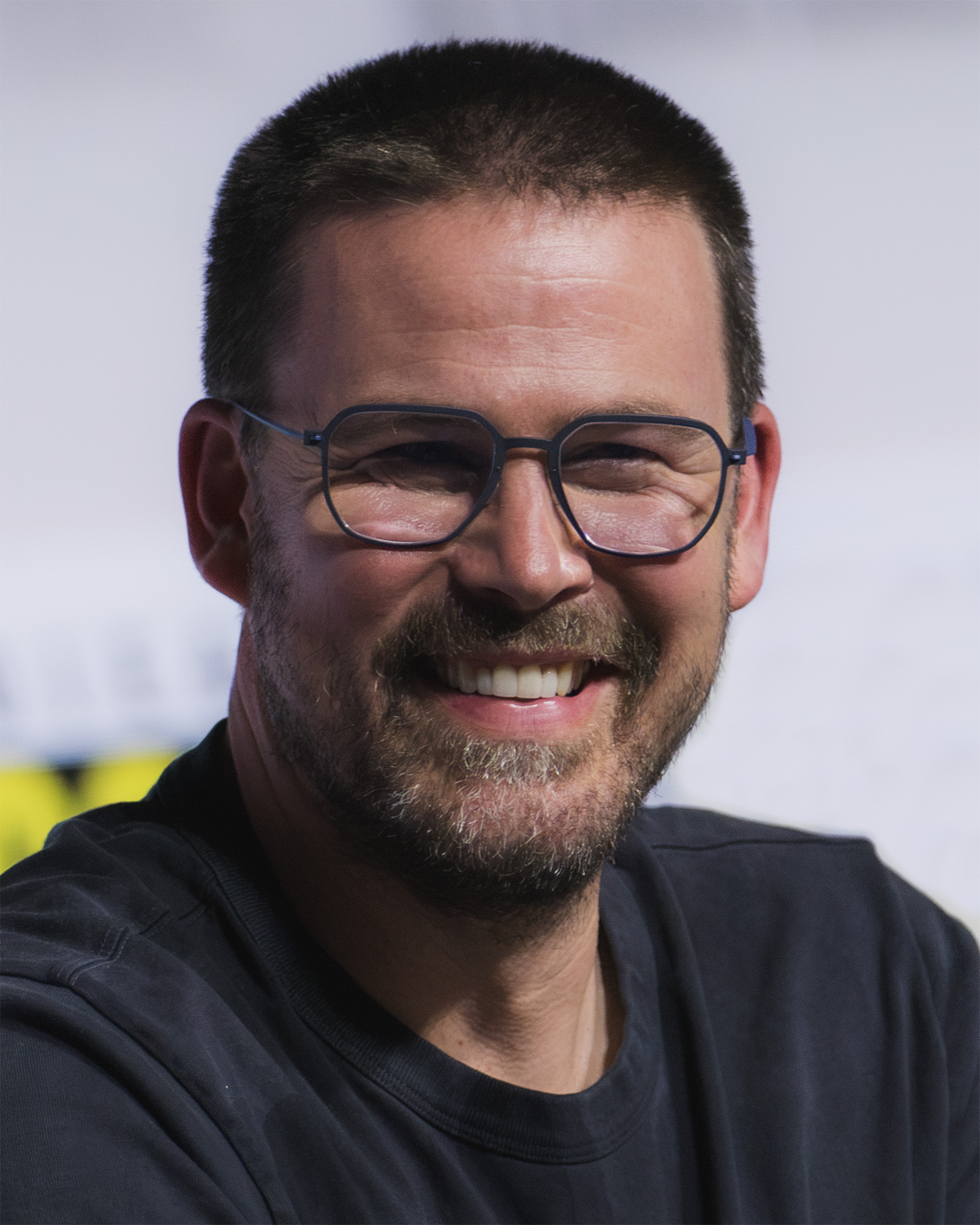
- Cregger at the 2026 San Diego Comic-Con
- Born: Zachary Michael Cregger; March 1, 1981 (age 45); Arlington, Virginia, U.S.
- Education: School of Visual Arts
- Occupations: Comedian; actor; director; writer; producer
- Years active: 1998–present
- Spouse: Sara Paxton (m. 2019)
- Awards: See below

Zachary Michael Cregger (born March 1, 1981) is an American comedian, actor, and filmmaker. Cregger is a founding member of the comedy troupe The Whitest Kids U' Know and starred in the sitcoms Friends with Benefits, Guys with Kids, and Wrecked. He wrote and directed the horror films Barbarian (2022), Weapons (2025), and Resident Evil (2026), also producing the latter two.

== Early life and education ==
Zachary Michael Cregger was born on March 1, 1981, and raised in Arlington, Virginia. He performed in various local comedy and music groups before moving to Brooklyn, New York to attend the School of Visual Arts.

== Career ==
=== Actor and comedian ===
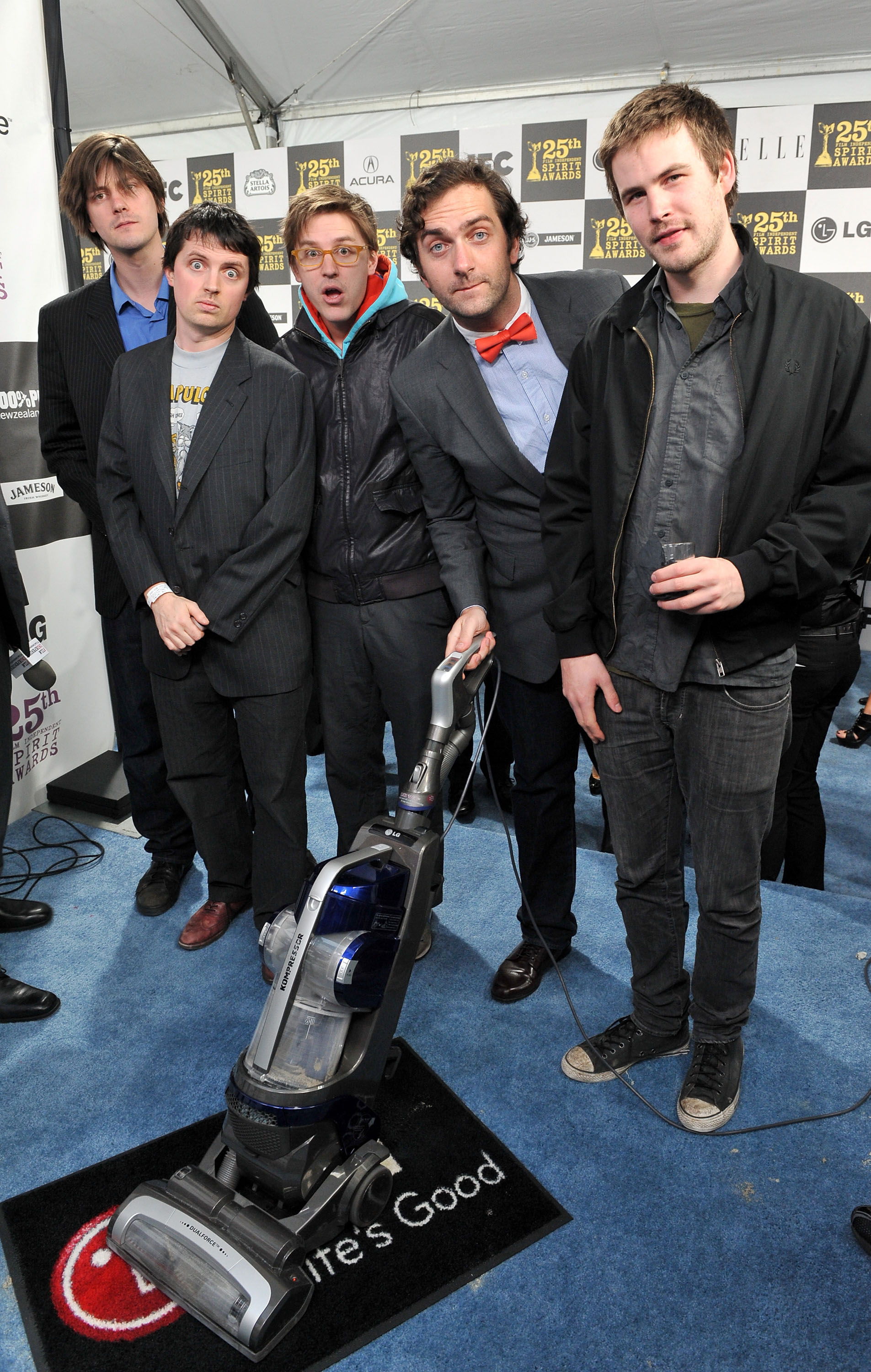
Cregger (far right) and The Whitest Kids U' Know at the 25th Independent Spirit Awards in 2010

Cregger is a founding member of the Whitest Kids U' Know comedy troupe, formed alongside Trevor Moore and Sam Brown in 2000. While shooting an independent film, he met Darren Trumeter who subsequently joined the group. The Whitest Kids U' Know garnered success locally and online, leading to an invitation to the HBO U.S. Comedy Arts Festival in Aspen, Colorado in 2006. The troupe won the award for Best Sketch Group and attracted the attention of several networks. Following the showcase, Fuse ordered a sketch series from the group. The Whitest Kids U' Know aired its first season on the network in 2007 before moving to then-sister network IFC. The series ran for five seasons before concluding in 2011.

Alongside Moore, he starred in and co-directed the films Miss March and The Civil War on Drugs. The latter received a limited theatrical release and aired as a recurring serial during the final season of The Whitest Kids U' Know. The troupe's second feature film, Mars, premiered at the Tribeca Festival in Lower Manhattan, New York on June 6, 2024. In 2008, Cregger made his first film appearance in Deb Hagan's directorial debut College. In 2011, he joined the cast of the NBC sitcom Friends with Benefits. He then starred on the NBC sitcom Guys with Kids from 2012 to 2013. From 2016 to 2018, he starred as Owen O'Connor on the TBS sitcom Wrecked.

=== Filmmaker ===
Cregger wrote and directed the 2022 horror film Barbarian, starring Georgina Campbell, Bill Skarsgård, and Justin Long. He wrote and directed the 2025 horror film Weapons, receiving critical acclaim and several accolades including the Academy Award for Best Supporting Actress for Amy Madigan. He wrote and directed Resident Evil (2026), based on the video game franchise of the same name from Capcom.

In December 2025, it was announced that he will serve as a producer on a feature film adaptation of Torso for Netflix. At the Warner Bros. Pictures panel at CinemaCon 2026, a new film directed by Cregger, the science fiction thriller The Flood, was announced. It is set for release on August 11, 2028, and will be co-produced with Amblin Entertainment. Jennifer Lawrence was cast in the lead role, and it was the last film greenlit by Pamela Abdy and Michael De Luca at Warner Bros. In the same panel, New Line announced a Weapons prequel titled Gladys, set for release on September 8, 2028, which is expected to be co-written with Zach Shields, but will not be directed by Cregger.

In 2026, Cregger was announced to be writing a film adaptation of Trevor Henderson's internet phenomenon Siren Head, with Brian Duffield set to direct.

== Personal life ==
In 2012, Cregger met actress Sara Paxton on the set of Love & Air Sex (2013), in which they portrayed an on-screen couple. They were engaged in 2018 and married in Austin, Texas in October 2019.

== Filmography ==
=== Film ===
Year	Title	Director	Writer	Producer	Notes	Ref.
2009	Miss March	Yes	Yes	No	Co-directed and co-written with Trevor Moore	
2021	The Civil War on Drugs	Yes	Yes	Executive	Co-directed and co-written with Trevor Moore	
2022	Barbarian	Yes	Yes	No		
2024	Mars	No	Yes	Yes		
2025	Companion	No	No	Yes		
2025	Weapons	Yes	Yes	Yes	Also composer	
2026	Resident Evil	Yes	Yes	Yes		

Acting roles
Year	Title	Role	Notes	Ref.
2005	Sound Barrier	Man on a bike		
2008	College	Cooper		
2009	Miss March	Eugene Bell		
2011	The Death and Return of Superman	Hal Jordan / Green Lantern	Short film	
2013	Love & Air Sex	Jeff		
2014	Date and Switch	Greg		
2016	Opening Night	Micky		
2018	Doubting Thomas	Graham		
2021	The Civil War on Drugs	Abraham Lincoln / various roles		
2022	Barbarian	Everett		
2024	Mars	Kyle Capshaw / various roles (voices)		
2026	Resident Evil	Intercom (voice)		

=== Television ===
Year	Title	Director	Writer	Producer	Creator
2004	The Lounge			Yes	
2004–2006	Uncle Morty's Dub Shack			Yes	
2006	Comedy Zen			Yes	
2007–2011	The Whitest Kids U' Know	Yes	Yes	Executive	Yes
2013	The Civil War on Drugs	Yes	Yes	Executive	Yes
2021	Sasquatch	No	No	Executive	No

Acting roles
Year	Title	Role	Notes
1998	Homicide: Life on the Street	Dean Stamper	Episode: "Brotherly Love"
2007–2011	The Whitest Kids U' Know	Various roles	Main cast
2011	Friends with Benefits	Aaron	Main cast
2012–2013	Guys with Kids	Nick	Main cast
2014	About a Boy	T.J.	Recurring role
2015	The McCarthys	Doug	Episode: "The Ref"
2016–2018	Wrecked	Owen	Main role
2019	Adam Ruins Everything	Berch	Episode: "Adam Ruins Nature"
2019	Just Roll with It	Brent	Episode: "Gator's Reunion"

== Awards and nominations ==
List of Cregger's nominations and awards
Award	Year	Category	Title	Result	Ref.
Astra Film Award	2026	Best Original Screenplay	Weapons	Nominated	
Critics' Choice Award	2026	Best Original Screenplay	Weapons	Nominated	
Fangoria Chainsaw Award	2023	Best Director	Barbarian	Nominated	
Fangoria Chainsaw Award	2023	Best Screenplay	Barbarian	Nominated	
Fangoria Chainsaw Award	2026	Best Director	Weapons	Nominated	
Fangoria Chainsaw Award	2026	Best Screenplay	Weapons	Nominated	
Producers Guild of America Award	2026	Outstanding Producer of Theatrical Motion Pictures	Weapons	Nominated	
Writers Guild of America Award	2026	Best Original Screenplay	Weapons	Nominated	
