= Uncle Morty's Dub Shack =

- Genre: Comedy
- Created by: Jimbo Matison; Trevor Moore
- Starring: Jimbo Matison; Trevor Moore; John Chou; Aladdin Ullah; Patrick T. McGowan
- Country of origin: United States
- No. of seasons: 2

Production
- Executive producer: Michael Hong
- Producers: Jimbo Matison; Trevor Moore
- Running time: 22 minutes
- Production company: ImaginAsian TV

Original release
- Network: ImaginAsian TV
- Release: 2004 – 2006

Uncle Morty's Dub Shack is a television series produced by the cable network ImaginAsian TV from 2004 through 2006. Written, directed by and starring Trevor Moore and James Matison ("Jimbo") and also starring John Chou, Aladdin Ullah and Patrick T. McGowan, the show ran for two seasons, though there is conflicting information about how many total episodes were produced. Moore left his role as writer/director for the majority of the second season, but returned for on-camera roles.

The show centered on a ramshackle audio studio run by Matison's fictitious Uncle Morty (McGowan), a grouchy old man suffering from hearing loss. When Morty is assigned to create English dubbed versions of poorly made Asian B-movies without scripts or translations, he enlists Matison and his out-of-work friends (Moore, Chou and Ullah, all using their real first names) as voice actors. Each episode features approximately 12 minutes of original sitcom footage, intercut with 10 minutes of an Asian film with new and unrelated replacement dialogue of a humorous nature. The sitcom section frequently featured animated sequences.

After the show initially wrapped, several episodes were recut with different pairings between original segments and the movies featured. Films featured included Chinese kung-fu movies from the 1970s such as Fist of Fury and Taoism Drunkard, as well as Bollywood films from the 1990s such as Kyon and Dand Nayak, plus a single Japanese film, Blowback 2: Love and Death.

== Guests ==
The show featured frequent guest stars, including comedians Master Lee, Aziz Ansari and Mike Dobbins, actress Elaine Kwon, and punk band Peelander-Z.

== Reaction ==
ImaginAsian TV had limited coverage (restricted to a few major metropolitan areas), so the show remained largely unknown throughout its run. However, several major press outlets ran favorable reviews of the show, including the San Francisco Examiner and Salon.com. Most compared the show to a faster-paced Mystery Science Theater 3000.
