= Extreme Gourmet =

Singaporean TV show

Extreme Gourmet is a television show broadcast in Singapore by MediaCorp. The show featured Lum May Yee and Alex Polstra travelling around China eating different food challenges. It is the first show of the Extreme franchise.

The show also featured celebrity guests for each episode with Hossan Leong voiceover, narrating the food challenge.
