= Bryan Poyser =

American film director and screenwriter (born 1975)

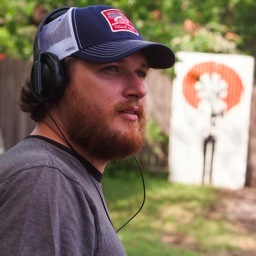
- Poyser on-set directing his 2013 film Love & Air Sex in Austin
- Born: 1975 (age 50–51); Austin, Texas
- Occupations: Director, screenwriter, producer, actor
- Years active: 2001–present

Bryan Poyser (born 1975) is an American film director and screenwriter. He is known for films such as Dear Pillow, Lovers of Hate, and Love & Air Sex.

== Career ==
A two-time Independent Spirit Award nominee, his second feature 'Lovers of Hate' premiered in the US Dramatic Competition at the 2010 Sundance Film Festival and was nominated for the John Cassavetes Award at the 2011 Independent Spirit Awards. Bryan was previously nominated for the Independent Spirit “Someone to Watch” Award in 2005 for his first feature, 'Dear Pillow'. In 2011, he wrote and directed 'The Fickle' for the “Character Project,” an online short film series produced by the USA Network and Ridley Scott Associates. Bryan served as the Director of Artist Services for the Austin Film Society for five years and remains on its board of directors. Bryan’s third feature, the Austin-set romantic comedy "Love and Air Sex", was released in 2013.

== Filmography ==
| Year | Name | Director | Writer | Producer | Editor | Notes |
|---|---|---|---|---|---|---|
| 1996 | Jesus of Judson | | Yes | | | SHORT |
| 2001 | Pleasureland | Yes | Yes | | | SHORT |
| 2004 | Dear Pillow | Yes | Yes | | | feature film |
| 2006 | The Cassidy Kids | | Yes | Yes | | feature film |
| 2007 | Grammy's | Yes | Yes | | Yes | SHORT |
| 2009 | The Crane House | Yes | Yes | | Yes | SHORT |
| 2010 | Lovers of Hate | Yes | Yes | | Yes | feature film |
| 2011 | Slacker 2011 | | Yes | Yes | | feature film |
| 2011 | The Fickle | Yes | Yes | | | SHORT via USA Network |
| 2013 | Love & Air Sex | Yes | Yes | | | feature film |
| 2015 | Slash | | | | Yes | feature film |
