= Trevor Moore =

American comedian and actor (1980–2021)

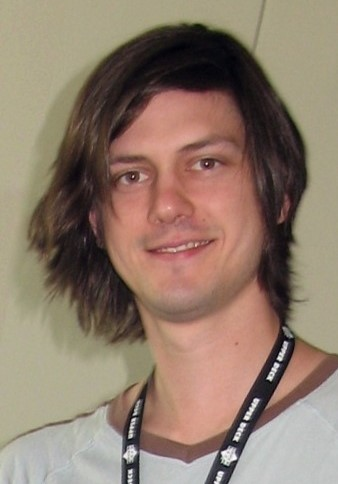
- Moore at the 2007 San Diego Comic-Con
- Born: Trevor Paul Moore; April 4, 1980; Montclair, New Jersey, U.S.
- Died: August 7, 2021 (aged 41); Los Angeles, California, U.S.
- Occupations: Comedian; actor; writer; director; producer; musician
- Years active: 1996–2021
- Height: 6 ft 6 in (198 cm)
- Spouse: Aimee Carlson (m. 2010)
- Children: 1

Trevor Paul Moore (April 4, 1980 – August 7, 2021) was an American comedian, actor, filmmaker, and musician. He was a founding member of the comedy troupe The Whitest Kids U' Know (WKUK), alongside Sam Brown, Zach Cregger, Timmy Williams, and Darren Trumeter. The troupe had a sketch comedy series which aired for five seasons on IFC from March 2007 until June 2011.

== Early life ==
Trevor Paul Moore was born on April 4, 1980, in Montclair, New Jersey. He grew up in rural Virginia, outside of Charlottesville. His parents are former Christian folk-rock singers Mickey and Becki Moore, who were successful in the 1980s, their single "Love Song for Number Two" having reached No. 2 on the U.S. Christian charts. Because he traveled a lot on tour with his family, he changed schools constantly, attending roughly five different schools. By the age of 14, he became the youngest published cartoonist in America after his comic Scraps was published by the Poindexter Press of Trevilians in 1994. At 16, Moore regularly published his comic strip Cuddy in the now-defunct newspaper The Charlottesville Observer.

Moore attended high school at the Covenant School in Charlottesville. He then enrolled as a broadcasting major at Virginia Commonwealth University where he originally intended to study journalism and political science. He ultimately studied at the School of Visual Arts in Manhattan.

== Career ==
=== 1990s ===
From 1996 to 1998, his show The Trevor Moore Show aired on CPA-TV, the public access station in Charlottesville, Virginia. It garnered a following among the local college community, and at age 18, Moore was offered a deal by the former Pax TV affiliate, WADA-LP. The show lasted sixteen episodes, featuring sketches like "Hey Hey, Who Died Today?" (a parody newscast from the local senior citizens' home) and the "Walking-Talking Box", but was cancelled due to what was deemed offensive material and a mistake regarding the programming of the show, namely being broadcast too early for its rating. It was his belief that the show would only air at night, but halfway through the first season he found out that it was being rerun at 9 a.m. on Saturday mornings.

Later, Moore went on to work at the cable TV startup company ImaginAsianTV as a producer and writer for Jimbo Matison's Uncle Morty's Dub Shack, a comedy show that involved comedians performing sketches and re-voicing and parodying old Asian movies.

=== 2000s ===
By 2002, in his last year of college, Moore was granted a personal internship at Saturday Night Live. Initially, Moore was only going to be there for one semester, but the show ended up asking him to stay for the entire year. This got him into the coveted NBC Page Program, which receives about 50,000 applications and only admits 50 people a year. He credits Saturday Night Live creator and executive producer Lorne Michaels as part of his comedic education.

In 2004, Moore's comedy troupe, the Whitest Kids U' Know (WKUK), started a regular engagement at the Lower East Side bar Pianos. The success of WKUK on the internet and in live shows led to an invitation to the 2006 HBO U.S. Comedy Arts Festival in Aspen. The troupe won the award for Best Sketch Group and attracted the attention of many Hollywood executives. Following their success at the festival, Sundance, MTV, and Comedy Central all approached the group to do a television pilot, however Fuse already had one in development. It is now in syndication around the world.

In 2008, Moore was a guest voice on an episode of the HBO show The Life and Times of Tim.

After the success of the Whitest Kids U' Know, Fox Searchlight approached Moore and Cregger with a script and offered them a movie project. After consideration, they accepted, rewrote the original script and adapted it to their comedy style, and after completing filming of the second season of The Whitest Kids U' Know, they directed and starred in Miss March. This was Moore's first feature film. It was released on March 13, 2009.

=== 2010s ===
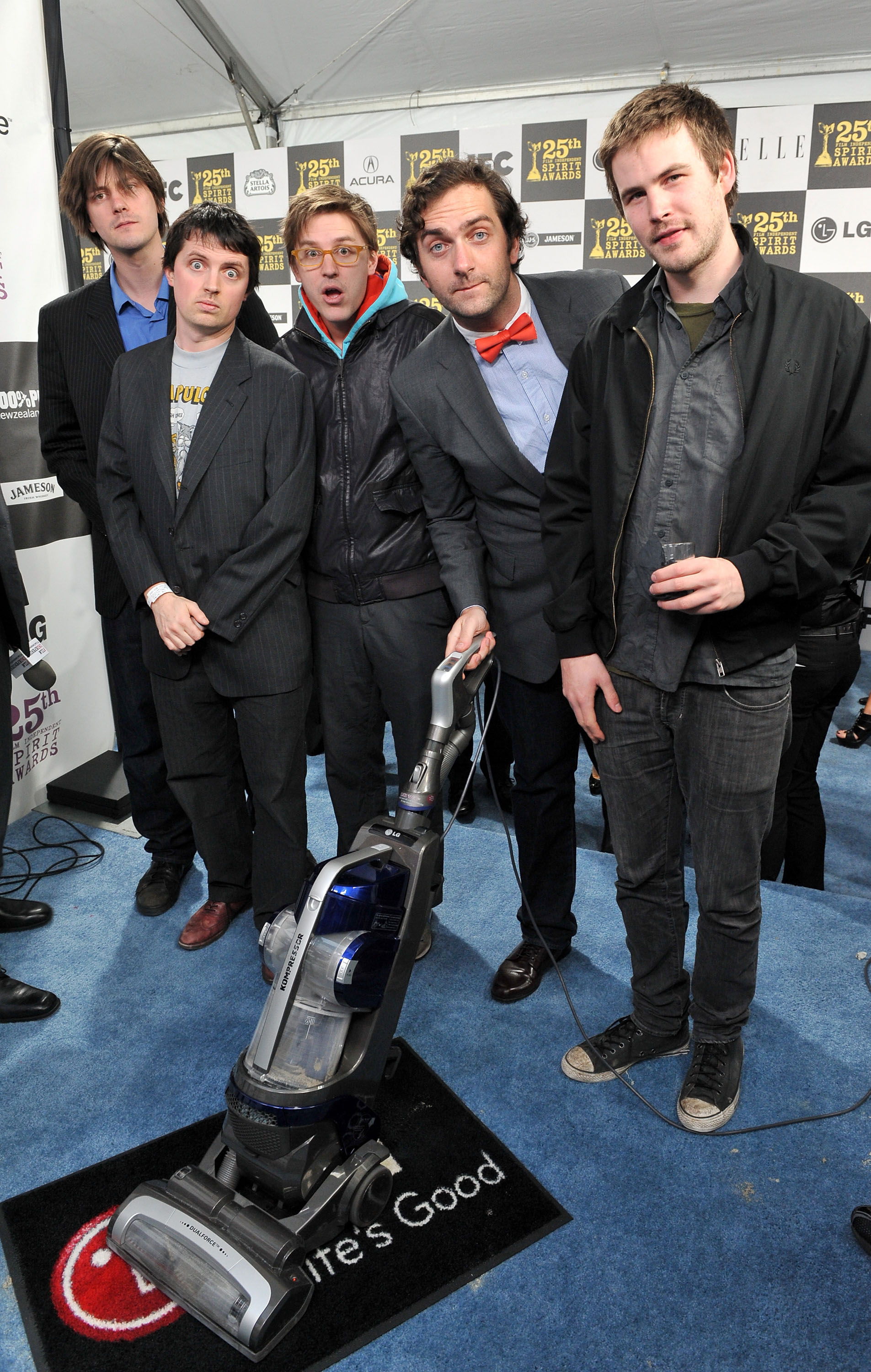
The Whitest Kids U' Know at an event in 2010. From left to right: Moore, Timmy Williams, Darren Trumeter, Sam Brown, and Zach Cregger

During their college years, Moore and Sam Brown had the idea for a movie about the American Civil War. Finally, while shooting the fifth season for The Whitest Kids U' Know, he and the troupe wrote and filmed his second feature film titled The Civil War on Drugs (2011), where they all played multiple roles. The movie was directed by Moore and Cregger. It had limited release in theaters and ultimately ran simultaneously with the fifth season of WKUK. It is a historical drama that the WKUK made to document the journey to legalize marijuana during the Civil War.

Moore played Josh Armstrong on Fox's comedy television series Breaking In.

Moore was periodically featured on The Tonight Show with Jay Leno in recurring segments showcasing pre-taped, man-on-the-street style comedy bits, featuring pranks on and encounters with an unsuspecting public. Moore also collaborated on various occasions with Funny or Die and Comedy Central.

Since the foundation of the WKUK comedy troupe, Moore and the other members have constantly participated in on-stage presentations, either individually or as a group in different projects. He toured every year with the WKUK troupe, performing old and new sketches in live shows. From time to time, Moore performed in live shows called the Whatev'r Show alongside other comedians in New York City and Hollywood.

On the first Tuesday of every month from November 6, 2012—when it opened with a special show on the night of the presidential election—through February 2013, Trevor Moore did a talk show and comedy show on stage with fellow comedian Josh Fadem in L.A. The show was called The Show Where Trevor Moore Does a Talk Show Thing and Josh Fadem Does Some Other Stuff Too All in One... Plus More.

Moore released his debut album, Drunk Texts to Myself, on Comedy Central Records in March 2013. He directed and starred in complementary musical videos for the album, also produced by Comedy Central. The album has 12 tracks, including "Drunk Texts to Myself (featuring Reggie Watts)", "What About Mouthwash?", and "Founding Fathers Rap". Drunk Texts to Myself represented contradiction in society using a variety of musical forms, going from rap and metal to country and pop. He performed the album along with some friends on a tour around the U.S.

Moore released his second album, High in Church, on Comedy Central on March 10, 2015. This album contained live and new songs. Unique songs included "Kitty History", a Beach Boys-style song about a version of U.S. history where people are kittens, which delves into conspiracy theories about the Bush family, the assassination of John F. Kennedy, and 9/11. Moore stated that the song was about conspiracy theories that "are provable in some way, the ones that have easily-Google-able facts." Also included on the album was "The Gays Got Married", a parody of country music; and "The Ballad of Billy John", which explores the nature of malicious YouTube comments. He released his third album, The Story of Our Times, on Comedy Central on April 20, 2018. Unlike the previous album, there are no live renditions of previously released songs. The subject matter is varied, including the inanity of YouTube celebrities, reality television and Internet trolls.

Moore co-created the hidden-camera prank show Walk the Prank, which aired for three seasons on Disney XD from 2016 to 2018. Following the show's conclusion, he co-created the Disney Channel show Just Roll With It, which premiered in June 2019. In September 2019, he signed an overall development deal to write and produce programming for Disney television and video on demand services.

In August 2019, Moore and Brown created The Trevor Moore Show, airing on Comedy Central.

=== 2020s ===
During the COVID-19 pandemic, Moore hosted The Trevor Moore Quarantine Show on YouTube, which consisted of homemade sketches with him and his dog, Porkchop, followed by interviews with his fellow WKUK cast members to discuss various topics, often pertaining to the pandemic.

Moore and the other members of The Whitest Kids U' Know began streaming on Twitch during the pandemic in order to crowdfund their animated film, Mars, which was in post-production at the time of Moore's passing. The troupe began by releasing Buckerson & Meyers, a Dungeons & Dragons campaign recorded over Zoom and then uploaded regularly to their YouTube channel.

The Twitch channel eventually diverged into multiple broadcasts across the week, each hosted by different members of the group, which included Self Suck Saturday. Moore also created Newsboyz, another live stream series airing on Friday evenings, co-hosted by Cregger. The two would discuss current world events and share personal anecdotes. The final episode of Newsboyz was filmed a couple of hours prior to his death.

== Personal life ==
Moore married Aimee Carlson in October 2010. The couple first met in 2002 when they were both working at NBC's Page Program; they had one son together who was born in August 2017.

Moore had a lifelong struggle with obsessive–compulsive disorder (OCD). The song "God Says", which appeared in Season 3 of The Whitest Kids U' Know, is loosely based on his own experiences of dealing with his compulsions as a child, and how his religious upbringing was intertwined with the intrusive thoughts. On his Twitch show, Newsboyz, he discussed how he was sent to a religious practitioner at age 12 to treat his OCD, which he said was ineffective due to many of his OCD tendencies being based in religious scrupulosity.

== Death and legacy ==
On August 7, 2021, at around 2:30 a.m., Moore died after accidentally falling from the upstairs balcony of his home in Franklin Hills, Los Angeles, resulting in blunt force head trauma. Subsequent toxicology reports identified alcohol as a contributing factor.

Approximately one month prior to the accident, Moore tweeted that, upon his death, he wanted to be referred to as "local sexpot" in his obituary, which was then honored by numerous news outlets such as Vulture in their memorial article.

Moore's final project with the Whitest Kids U' Know, Mars, premiered posthumously at the Tribeca Film Festival on June 6, 2024.

Whitest Kids U' Know co-star and friend of Moore Zach Cregger began work on Weapons in response to Moore's death.

== Filmography ==
=== Film ===
Year	Title	Director	Writer	Producer	Role	Note	Ref.
2002	Marathon	No	No	No	Unnamed Man	Also sound recordist	
2009	Miss March	Yes	Yes	Yes	Tucker Cleigh	Co-directed and co-written with Zach Cregger	
2011	The Civil War on Drugs	Yes	Yes	Yes	Trevor, various roles	Co-directed and co-written with Zach Cregger	
2014	Our Robocop Remake	No	No	No	Male Shop Owner	Cameo appearance, convenience store robbery scene	
2024	Mars	No	Yes	Yes	Elron Bronson / Cooter / Todd Sullivan / various roles (voices)	Posthumous release	

=== Television ===
Year	Title	Director	Writer	Producer	Creator	Composer	Role	Note	Ref.
1996–1998	The Trevor Moore Show	Yes	Yes	Yes	Yes	Yes	Himself	also editor	
2004–2006	Uncle Morty's Dub Shack	No	No	No	No	No	Various roles		
2007–2011	The Whitest Kids U' Know	Yes	Yes	Yes	Yes	No	Various roles		
2011	Breaking In	No	No	No	No	No	Josh Armstrong		
2011–2013	The Tonight Show with Jay Leno	No	No	No	No	No	Various roles	Comedy segments: Winnovations, Dare	
2015	Trevor Moore's High in Church	No	Yes	No	No	Yes	Himself	also Visionary Prophet, singer, guitar-player	
2016–2018	Walk the Prank	No	No	Yes	Yes	No	-		
2018	The Story of Our Times	No	Yes	No	No	Yes	Himself	also singer	
2019–2021	Just Roll with It	No	Yes	Yes	Yes	Yes	-		
2019–2021	The Trevor Moore Show	Yes	Yes	Yes	Yes	Yes	Himself		

== On stage ==
- Whitest Kids U' Know Live (2006–2013)
- Whatev'r Show (2011–2012)
- The Show Where Trevor Moore Does a Talk Show Thing… (2012–2013)

== Discography ==
Year	Album	Label	Note(s)	Ref.
2006	The Whitest Kids U' Know	What Are Records?	Performer, composer	
2013	Drunk Texts to Myself (Audio CD)	Comedy Central Rec.	Vocalist, composer; feat. Reggie Watts	
2015	High in Church (Audio CD)	Comedy Central Rec.	Vocalist, composer	
2018	The Story of Our Times (Digital Download)	Comedy Central Rec.	Vocalist, composer	
