= The Whitest Kids U' Know =

American television series

- Title card
- Created by: Sam Brown; Zach Cregger; Trevor Moore; Darren Trumeter; Timmy Williams
- Theme music composer: Craig Wedren
- Country of origin: United States
- No. of seasons: 5
- No. of episodes: 60 (list of episodes)

Production
- Executive producer: Jim Biederman
- Running time: 20–24 min (Fuse); 30 min (IFC, 2007–2008, 2010–2011); 15 min (IFC, 2009)
- Production companies: Good Shepard Productions; Jimco; Whitest Kids Business Company International Conglomerate LLC

Original release
- Network: Fuse (2007); IFC (2007–2011)
- Release: March 20, 2007 – June 17, 2011

The Whitest Kids U' Know (WKUK) is an American sketch comedy television series starring the comedy troupe of the same name. The group consisted of Trevor Moore, Zach Cregger, Sam Brown, Timmy Williams, and Darren Trumeter. The series ran from 2007 to 2011, originally airing on Fuse before moving to then-sister network IFC.

== Formation ==
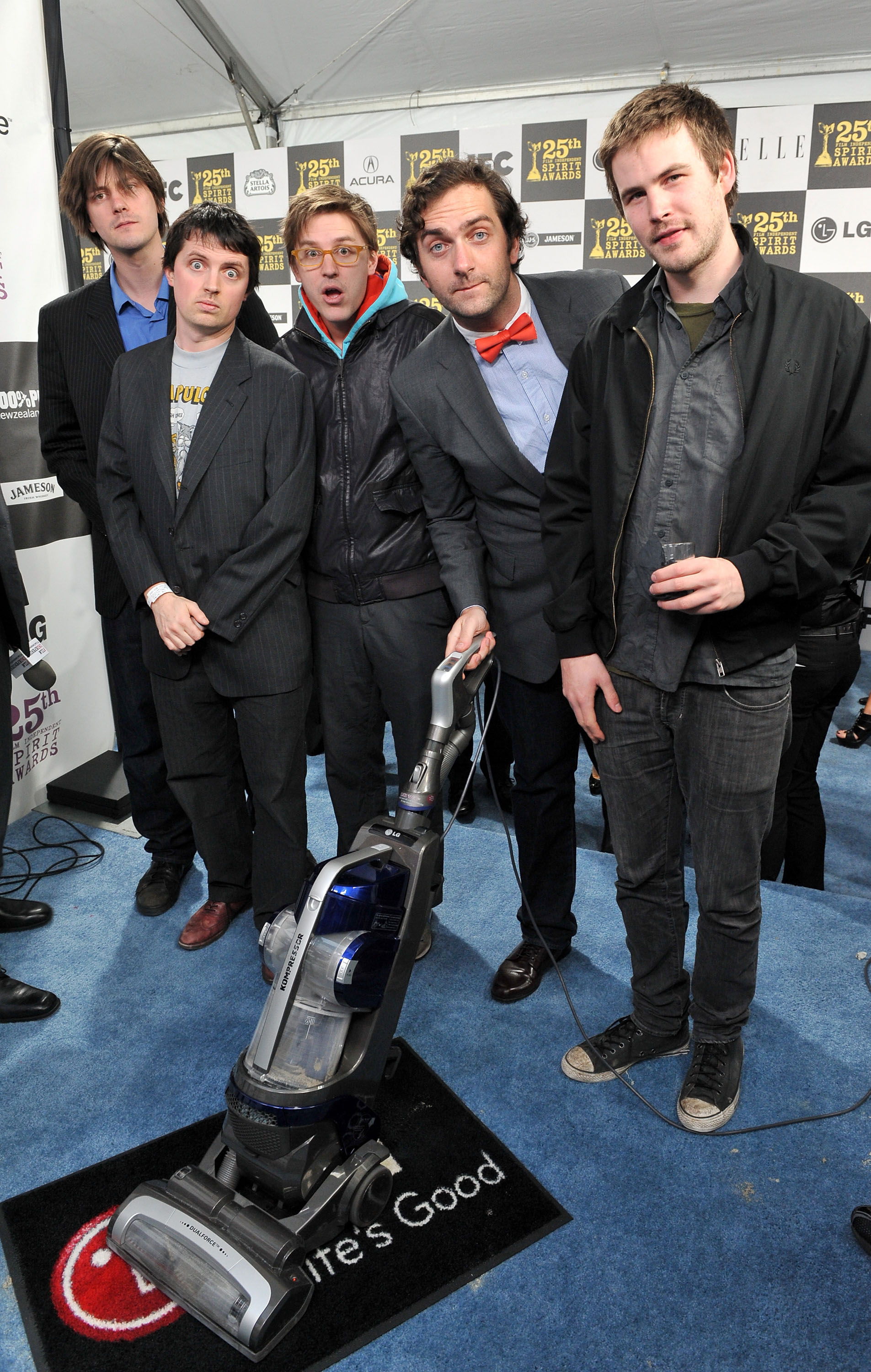
The troupe at an event in 2010. From left to right: Trevor Moore, Timmy Williams, Darren Trumeter, Sam Brown, and Zach Cregger

In 1999, Trevor Moore moved to New York City from Charlottesville, Virginia, to attend the School of Visual Arts (SVA) film program. Moore had previously been commissioned by a local PAX Network in his hometown to produce his own public access show titled The Trevor Moore Show, which aired from 1997 to 1999. While performing at local New York City comedy clubs, future WKUK member Sam Brown, from Massachusetts, introduced himself to Moore after a show. The two later found out that they both attended SVA and lived in the same student housing accommodation, Hotel St. George.

Moore and Brown later met graphic design student Zach Cregger, from Arlington, Virginia, who also lived in their student housing. Cregger became the third member of the troupe. Moore has stated the group's name originated during a freestyle rapping session on a subway when they were called "the whitest kids I know" by one of their friends.

On September 11, 2001, Moore, Brown and Cregger met Timmy Williams while attempting to observe the twin towers during the September 11 attacks from Hotel St. George. Cregger later introduced Darren Trumeter, an actor and filmmaker with whom he had worked on a student project, to the troupe.

The Whitest Kids U' Know held monthly shows at SVA's amphitheater, which would frequently fill to capacity. From 2003 to 2005, WKUK performed at comedy venues in New York City. They held a regular spot at Pianos before Fuse picked up a television series from the group.

== Television ==
In early 2006, comedy producer Jim Biederman and WKUK sold a self-titled sketch show to Fuse after the group won the Best Sketch Group award at the Aspen Comedy Festival. Production of the first season took place in New York City during the summer of 2006. The Whitest Kids U' Know premiered on March 20, 2007.

On July 12, 2007, Moore posted a message on WKUK's official website announcing that the second season of the show would move to Independent Film Channel (IFC). Due to what Fuse perceived as extreme comedy, the second season order came with limitations on content. However, the head of Fuse programming, Jennifer Caserta, left to become General Manager of IFC and brought the show with her to the network. At the time, Fuse and IFC were both part of Rainbow Media. According to Moore, the switch allowed for no commercial breaks, with vulgarities and obscene content uncensored. Production of the second season started on August 13, 2007, and premiered on IFC on February 10, 2008. The tenth episode of season two was broadcast live, with sketches performed on stage. Moore later stated the live episode was a response to the season being one episode short.

The third season premiered on January 27, 2009, and was composed of ten half-hour episodes and twenty 15-minute episodes, with both formats airing on the network. The fourth season premiered on June 11, 2010, retaining the previous season's episode formats.

The fifth season premiered on April 15, 2011, and was the final season of the show. The format of ten half-hour episodes remained, with each episode ending with a segment of The Civil War on Drugs, a full-length film starring WKUK members reimagining the American Civil War as a war on drugs.

== Films ==
=== The Civil War on Drugs ===
The Civil War on Drugs originally aired as a series of ten sketches throughout the fifth season of The Whitest Kids U' Know in 2011. In May 2013, the sketches were given a standalone release as a ten-episode web series on The Whitest Kids U'Know YouTube channel. In December 2020, Moore revealed that the feature-length version of the film would be released with a commentary by him and the rest of the troupe. The Civil War on Drugs was released in a feature film format on Prime Video in February 2021.

=== Mars ===
In 2012, Moore wrote on his website that a true The Whitest Kids U' Know movie was planned, and that the script was being written. On February 11, 2017, Moore announced via Instagram that the film's script had been completed. On November 17, 2020, Cregger revealed on Twitch that the film would be animated and titled Mars. He stated that instead of being funded by a studio, they preferred to raise the money themselves.

On August 23, 2021, speaking of Moore's passing and the film while streaming, Cregger announced: "We are going to finish Mars! All of Trevor's lines are recorded, he has given notes on the animatic, everything that we need to get done is done. So, the Mars that is going to be completed is the Mars that — I want everyone to know — Trevor signed off on." In September 2022, Cregger revealed that the film had nearly wrapped production, and that, as a result of Moore's death, it would be the troupe's final project.

On April 17, 2024, it was announced that Mars would premiere at the Tribeca Film Festival on June 6, 2024, with encore screenings on June 8 and 15. The film was directed by Sevan Najarian. The film was then released on Blu-ray in early 2026, in addition to video on demand platforms and a limited theatrical release.

== Album ==
The Whitest Kids U' Know

Studio album by The Whitest Kids U' Know
- Released: September 5, 2006
- Genre: Comedy
- Length: 32:33
- Label: W.A.R.?

The Whitest Kids U' Know is a self-titled compilation of skits by the troupe released in 2006 on the label What Are Records?. The album includes songs that are featured in the first season of The Whitest Kids U' Know television show in addition to several audio skits.

The album was written by Trevor Moore, Zach Cregger, Sam Brown, Darren Trumeter, and Timmy Williams.

=== Track listing ===
No.	Title	Length
1.	"Welcome"	3:06
2.	"Triumph of the Ill (Hitler Rap)"	3:30
3.	"Russian Roulette"	2:49
4.	"Special Ops Whispering"	3:26
5.	"Get a New Daddy"	2:42
6.	"Beautiful Penis"	2:35
7.	"Let's Wake Up the Neighbors"	1:37
8.	"Sam's Message"	0:29
9.	"Bus Driver"	7:04
10.	"B Cup"	1:12
11.	"We Gon' Make Luv"	3:06
12.	"Goodnight"	0:56

Tracks 2, 5, 7 and 11 are absent on the skits-only digital download version of the album.
