= New Zealand's Got Talent =

- Genre: Talent show
- Created by: Simon Cowell; Ken Warwick; Cécile Frot-Coutaz; Jason Raff
- Presented by: Andrew Mulligan; Jason Reeves; Tāmati Coffey
- Judges: Richard Driver; Paul Ellis; Miriama Smith; Jason Kerrison; Rachel Hunter; Ali Campbell; Cris Judd
- Country of origin: New Zealand
- Original language: English
- No. of series: 3
- No. of episodes: 39

Production
- Executive producer: Bettina Hollings
- Camera setup: Multi-camera
- Running time: 48 minutes
- Production companies: South Pacific Pictures (2008); Imagination Television (2012–13)

Original release
- Network: Prime (2008); TV One (2012–13)
- Release: 8 September 2008 – 15 December 2013

New Zealand's Got Talent is a New Zealand reality television show which premiered in 2008. The show was based on the Got Talent series. The show featured singers, dancers, magicians, comedians and other variety performers of all ages competing for a top prize of $100,000 cash and a Toyota RAV4 car. Three judges appear on the show each week to provide feedback for the contestants.

The show originally screened on Prime for one series before being dropped. TV One later revived the show, with series produced in 2012 and 2013.

The original line-up on Prime included Andrew Mulligan and Jason Reeves as hosts, with Miriama Smith, Paul Ellis and Richard Driver as judges. After the show was revived in 2012, the show was presented by Tāmati Coffey, with Ali Campbell, Rachel Hunter, and Jason Kerrison on the judging panel. Choreographer Cris Judd replaced Campbell for the show's 2013 series.

== History ==
In 2008, New Zealand broadcaster Prime Television launched a local version of the hit international show. The hosts were TV presenter Andrew Mulligan and radio host Jason Reeves, with actress Miriama Smith, former NZ Idol judge Paul Ellis and television producer and presenter Richard Driver as judges. The series had a top prize of NZ$100,000. The first episode went on air on 8 September 2008. Despite good ratings for the network, Prime was unable to outrun costs and decided not to renew the series for another season.

In 2012, TVNZ bought the rights to the series and on 9 September season 2 premiered on TV One, with Tāmati Coffey as the host, and model Rachel Hunter, Opshop singer-songwriter Jason Kerrison and UB40 frontman Ali Campbell judging. Toyota was confirmed to be the foundation partner.

TVNZ confirmed a third series would be produced in 2013. Tāmati Coffey returned as host, and Jason Kerrison and Rachel Hunter returned as judges, joined by American choreographer Cris Judd.

In 2014 TVNZ confirmed that a fourth series of the show would not be produced that year, with the network instead putting its resources towards producing a local version of cooking show My Kitchen Rules.

Since 2014, New Zealand contestants have been on Australia's Got Talent, such as in 2019.

== Hosts and judges ==
Series	Host		Main Judge		
Series	Host		1	2	3
1	Andrew Mulligan	Jason Reeves	Richard Driver	Miriama Smith	Paul Ellis
2	Tāmati Coffey	—N/a	Jason Kerrison	Rachel Hunter	Ali Campbell
3	Tāmati Coffey	—N/a	Jason Kerrison	Rachel Hunter	Cris Judd

== Series overview ==
Series	Start	Finish	Winner	Runner-up	Third place	Channel	Sponsor
1	8 September 2008	28 October 2008	Chaz Cummings	TMC	Gaylene Stewart	Prime	Pringles
2	9 September 2012	2 December 2012	Clara van Wel	Jessie Hillel	Evan Sinton	TV One	Toyota New Zealand
3	15 September 2013	8 December 2013	Renee Maurice	Silhouette	Jenny Mitchell	TV One	Toyota New Zealand

== Episodes ==
=== Series 1 ===
The series began on 8 September 2008 on Prime and ended on 29 October 2008. It was produced by South Pacific Pictures. Starting 29 September, the live semi-finals started aired on Monday nights, with the results show on Tuesday nights. The top two finalists were dancer Chaz Cummings and musical group TMC, with Chaz Cummings eventually becoming the winner of the first series of New Zealand's Got Talent.

=== Series 2 ===
Series two ran from 9 September 2012 and ended on 2 December 2012. Episodes were pre-recorded and broadcast on Sunday evenings at 7.30pm. In February 2012, TVNZ announced that a new local version of the show was in the early stages of production and would screen on TV One. Broadcast funding agency NZ On Air committed to $1.6 million in funding to the new show. The series was hosted by Tāmati Coffey, with Ali Campbell, Rachel Hunter, and Jason Kerrison as the judges. The series was won by 15-year-old singer-songwriter Clara van Wel from Blenheim who performed her own song "Where Do You Find Love?". 11-year-old singer Jessie Hillel from Wellington was the runner-up, with 17-year-old singer-songwriter Evan Sinton from Auckland in third place.

=== Series 3 ===
In November 2012, TVNZ confirmed the show would return for a third series in 2013. Applications for the 2013 series also opened in November. Series three premiered on 15 September 2013. Host Tamai Coffey and judges Rachel Hunter and Jason Kerrison returned to the series, with choreographer Cris Judd replacing Ali Campbell on the judging panel. NZ On Air funded $800,000 towards the series, a 50% reduction from the 2012 series production. NZ On Air noted that any future series would not be eligible for funding.
