= Kelvin Taylor (actor) =

American actor, dancer, model, and voice actor

- Born: Kelvin Lewis Taylor; January 18, 1985 (age 41); Hampton, Virginia, U.S.
- Other name: Kelz
- Occupations: Actor; dancer; model; voice actor
- Years active: 2005–present
- Known for: Born to Dance, Come Dine with Me New Zealand, Spartacus (TV series), Power Rangers Megaforce
- Television: James Patterson's Murder Is Forever, The Shannara Chronicles, Ash vs Evil Dead
- Website: kelvintaylor.com

Kelvin Lewis Taylor (born January 18, 1985, in Hampton, Virginia), is an American born New Zealand actor based in Auckland. His film appearances include the documentary "The Golden Hour". The documentary received an International Emmy nomination for the Best Documentary Award at the 41st International Emmy Awards. Taylor appeared on the second week of the first season of Come Dine with Me New Zealand.

== Early life ==
Taylor was raised in Newport News, Virginia alongside his twin sister, Princess. His ethnic heritage links him to Nigerian Moors; he is of African, British, German, Irish, and French descent. His mother, Rhonda (Taylor) Clark, was a playwright who was orphaned in New Orleans and relocated to New York City. Taylor made his stage debut in 1990 at the age of 5, playing the lead role in a kindergarten production of The Gingerbread Man. When he was 11, his family relocated to Virginia Beach, Virginia.

== Career ==
Taylor began modelling at age 19 for the Shmack Clothing in collaboration with Billionaire Boys Club / BAPE. An altercation would later hinder his modelling career and lead him into undergoing emergency plastic surgery. It was later revealed according to a 2020 article in The New Zealand Herald the attack was racially motivated. After making friendships on social-media website MySpace, a trip to Sydney, Australia and Perth, Western Australia in 2008 lead him into acting after signing up to a roommates short film as a breakdancer for Edith Cowan University. He later appeared in commercials and music videos for the likes of N.E.R.D, Fam-Lay feat. Pharrell Williams. Humble beginnings, he would find a start as a background actor in Spartacus before showing up on New Zealand's Three (TV channel).

Taylor went on to make guest appearances in Ash vs Evil Dead, The Shannara Chronicles and James Patterson's Murder Is Forever. He was cast as Malcolm X in American Playboy: The Hugh Hefner Story, however the role was cancelled as production opted to use archived footage instead. He was also a student of Meisner Technique instructor Michael Saccenté, acting coach of Karl Urban and Antony Starr (The Boys).

As of 2008, Kelvin Taylor resides between Australia, New Zealand and the United States. Having appearing on Adult Swim's FishCenter Live and Post Malone's Goodbyes (Post Malone song) Music Video, he was recently cast in season 2 of Gēmusetto: Death Beat(s)

== Filmography ==
=== Films ===
Year	Title	Role	Note
2013	Hadir and The Deep	Sayed	
2014	Born with Happiness	Danny	
2015	Born to Dance	African American Dance Crew Leader	
2016	Electro City 3	Dynamite	Short Film
2016	Value	Mike	Short Film
2018	Reset	Revolter	Short Film
2018	Cottonmouth	Johnny	
2018	Wake	American Soldier	
2018	The Breaker Upperers	Party Goer (as "Kelvin Taylor)	
2020	Surge of Power: Surge of Dawn	Benny	
2020	World War Four	Dave Bradley	
2020	Older	City Lover	
2020	Alien Addiction	DJ	
2021	Last Star	Jaks (Ranger 3)	(Post-Production)
2021	Internecionem	Aramon	(Post-production)
2021	Into The Unknown	Brad	(Post-production)

=== Television ===
Year	Title	Role	Note
2011	Spartacus	Kraynos	14 episodes
2013	Power Rangers Super Megaforce	Cyclist	1 Episode "Power of Six"
2014	Oddball's	Jayden	TV mini series
2015	Come Dine with Me New Zealand	Himself	5 episodes (fifth Place)
2016	Ash vs Evil Dead	Orderly	2 episodes
2017	American Playboy: The Hugh Hefner Story	Malcolm X	TV documentary Series, 1 episode
2017	The Shannara Chronicles	Crimson Guard	1 Episode
2018	James Patterson's Murder is Forever	Detective (Fisher)	1 Episode
2018	Nigel Latta's Mind Over Money 2	Himself	1 Episode
2018	Vida (TV series)	Kissing Couple (Afro-Latino Male)	1 Episode
2018	Criminal Confessions (TV series)	Brian Golsby	1 Episode
2018	America's Court with Judge Ross	Scott Goggins	1 Episode
2018	Funny You Should Ask (2017 game show)	as "Kelvin Taylor"	1 Episode
2019	FishCenter Live	Himself	2 episodes
2019	Action Figure Miles	Maurice	1 Episode
2020	No Limit Chronicles	Big Ed	1 Episode
2020	Gēmusetto: Death Beat(s)	Kelvin	2 episodes
2021	The War At Home	Stan Gatland	1 Episode

=== Documentary ===
Year	Title	Role	Note
2012	The Golden Hour	George Kerr	Nominated Best Documentary Award at 2013 International Emmy Award

=== Music video ===
Year	Title	Artist	Role
2007	Da Beeper Record	Fam-Lay feat Pharrell Williams	Night Club Entourage
2008	Everyone Nose	N.E.R.D	Party Goer
2010	Maori Boy	JGeek and the Geeks	Breakdancer
2012	Black, White and Blue	Ladyhawke	Camp MUA
2015	Don't Hang Around Here	Sir T	MMA Fighter
2016	Kind of Love	MAALA	Sensual Male
2016	Ones Cycle	Yokozuna feat Bailey Wiley	Himself
2016	When I Leave	Maaka & White Wall	Motorcyclist Boyfriend
2017	YES	Yokozuna feat Heavy & LarzRanda	African American Boyfriend
2017	The Sweetest Meditation	Lord Echo feat Mara TK	Himself
2018	Voltron	Yokozuna	Drakkus (Level 17 Warlock)
2018	I'm So 90's (Neo Jack Swing Mix)	Lewis City	Twin
2018	Gabruu Nu	Diljit Dosanjh	Dancer Entourage
2018	Lifted	Parker Bossley	Graffiti Artist
2018	ReDerik	Locksmith (rapper)	Locksmiths Crew
2018	From The Outside	Real Friends (band)	Photographer
2018	Boomin In Your Jeep	Crystal Fighters	Burning Man Dancer
2018	Shanter Claus	William Shatner	Freestyle Dancer
2018	We Will Meet Once Again	Andrea Bocelli	South African Young Man
2018	Checklist	Megan Nicole	Bachelor
2018	Prom Queen	Lil Kloroxxx Bart Baker	Goldie Wilson
2018	BURN IT	The Fever 333	Alt Teen
2018	BlackAss	Rakeem Miles	ROM the Android
2019	World War X	Carnifex (band)	Nightmare
2019	H.O.E.S	Eearz	Goon Fronts
2019	Take It Easy feat.Smokepurpp	Octavian (rapper)	Crew
2019	Que lo Que	Social Club Misfits	BBoy
2019	Goodbyes feat. Young Thug	Post Malone	Donnie's Best Friend
2019	Icy	Itzy	Single Male Patron
2019	Blurry	Crown The Empire	Dream Guy
2019	Proofread feat. Wiz Khalifa	Famous Dex	Single Male Patron
2019	Eres Top feat. DJ Snake & Sean Combs	Ozuna	Punk Alien Leader
