= New Zealand's Got Talent series 3 =

New Zealand television series

New Zealand's Got Talent
- Series 3
- Hosted by: Tāmati Coffey
- Judges: Jason Kerrison; Rachel Hunter; Cris Judd
- Winner: Renee Maurice
- Runner-up: Silhouette

Release
- Original network: TVNZ
- Original release: 15 September – 8 December 2013

Series chronology
- ← Previous; Series 2

New Zealand's Got Talent was a New Zealand reality television show, based on the original UK series, to find new talent. The third and final series began airing on TV One from 15 September 2013. Host Tāmati Coffey returned to the show, along with judges Jason Kerrison and Rachel Hunter and key sponsor Toyota New Zealand. Cris Judd also joined the judging panel, replacing Ali Campbell. The series screened at 7.30pm on Sunday evenings.

The series was won by 22-year-old singer Renee Maurice from Wellington, who performed "And I Am Telling You I'm Not Going". Maurice had previously made it to the bootcamp round of the first New Zealand series of The X Factor. Christchurch dance duo Silhouette was the runner-up, with 14-year-old singer-songwriter Jenny Mitchell from Gore in third place. Unlike 2012 winner Clara van Wel, Maurice was not given a recording contract, after Sony opted not to sign her. Maurice did, however, still receive the prize of a new car and $80,000 cash.

== Background ==
In November 2012, TVNZ confirmed the show would return for a third series in 2013. In July 2013, funding agency NZ On Air confirmed that it would give the series $800,000 in production funding, a 50% reduction from the 2012 series funding.

== Host and judges ==
Series 3 judges

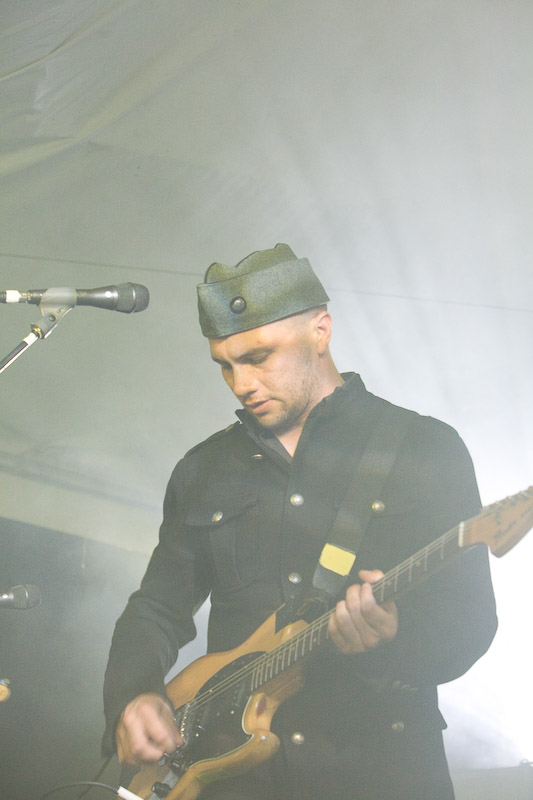
Jason Kerrison

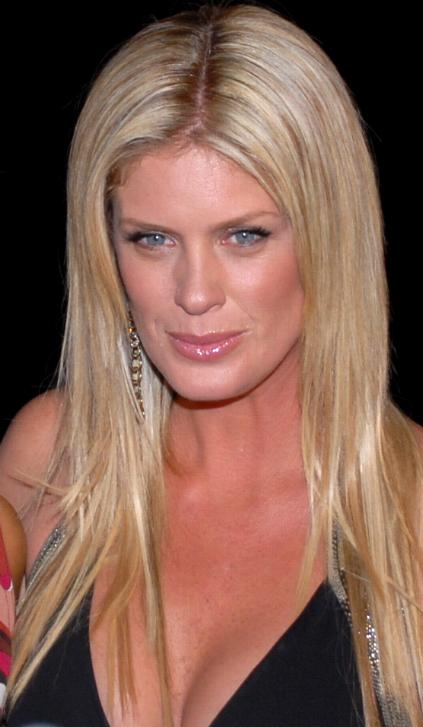
Rachel Hunter

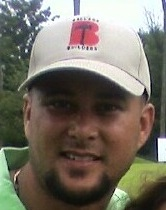
Cris Judd

In December 2012, series two host Tāmati Coffey announced his plans to tour Europe for six months in early 2013, expressing his intention to return to New Zealand to present the 2013 series. In June 2013 he was confirmed as returning as series host. In April, TVNZ confirmed Opshop frontman Jason Kerrison would return as a judge. In May, TVNZ confirmed that American choreographer Cris Judd would join the judging panel and that Rachel Hunter would return to the judging panel for 2013.

== Auditions ==
The first call for auditions was made in November 2012. Contestants could enter in one of three ways: online, via post, or in person at an open audition venue as part of the Toyota Talent Tour. From late April to early June 2013, the show's producers toured around New Zealand towns and cities with the Toyota Talent Tour and held non-televised open auditions. The top applicants then progressed to the judges' auditions.

The following list contains all of the cities, venues and dates of the Toyota Talent Tour.

Audition city/town	Date	Venue
Invercargill	29 April 2013	Southland Boys High School
Dunedin	30 April 2013	Otago Boys High School
Dunedin	1 May 2013	Otago Boys High School
Timaru	3 May 2013	Roncalli College
Christchurch	5 May 2013	Addington Event Centre
Christchurch	6 May 2013	Addington Event Centre
Greymouth	8 May 2013	Tai Poutini Polytechnic
Nelson	9 May 2013	Nelson School of Music
New Plymouth	14 May 2013	New Plymouth Boys High School
Wellington	17 May 2013	Wellington East Girls College
Wellington	18 May 2013	Wellington East Girls College
Napier	20 May 2013	Napier War Memorial Conference Centre
Hamilton	25 May 2013	Southwell School
Rotorua	28 May 2013	John Paul College
Tauranga	29 May 2013	Otumoetai College
Whangarei	4 June 2013	Whangarei Girls High School
Auckland	8 June 2013	Epsom Girls Grammar School
Auckland	9 June 2013	Epsom Girls Grammar School

=== Judges auditions ===
The judges auditions took place in Dunedin at the Regent Theatre on 14 and 15 July, in Auckland at the City Impact Church on 25 and 27 July and in Wellington at the St James Theatre on 10 and 11 August. The first episode aired on 15 September 2013, running for 90 minutes. After the judges' auditions, the successful contestants will be further reduced down to a group of 30 for the semi-finals.

== Semi-finals ==
There are six semi-finals, with the first episode broadcast on 10 October. The semi-finals are pre-recorded the Thursday before broadcast at the City Impact Church in Albany, Auckland. The winners of each week's semi-final were revealed at the beginning of the next week's episode.

=== Tip Top Natural Talent Search ===
In addition to 30 semi-finalists, one wildcard entry will be chosen by a public competition. The Tip Top Natural Talent Search competition is open to any act. Acts upload a video audition and are voted on by the public. The top five acts were revealed in semi-final four, with the winner selected by the judges and announced in semi-final five. The five top acts were: The Pack (dance trio), The Black Trio (singing trio), Troublemakers Dance Crew (dance group), Shane Brown (singer) and APD Bhangra Group (dance group).

=== Semi-finalists ===
Key	Semi-Finalist (lost judges' vote)	Finalist	Winner	Runner up	Third place

Name	Genre	Act	Age	From	Semi	Position reached
50/50 Dance Crew	Dance	Dance Group	16–24	Auckland	1	Eliminated
Renee Maurice	Singing	Singer	22	Wellington	1	Winner
Ravi	Variety	Martial Artist	37	Auckland	1	Eliminated
This Is Unicycling	Variety	Unicycle Duo	21 & 22	Kaikohe, Nelson	1	Eliminated
Mayo	Dance	Dancer	21	Pukekohe	1	Finalist
Diamond Divas	Singing	Singing Duo	40 & 49	Porirua	1	Eliminated
MDM	Singing	Singing Trio	12–16	Auckland	2	Eliminated
Brian and Sarah	Dance	Dance Duo	18	Christchurch	2	Finalist
Gabriella Atkinson	Singing	Singer	13	Nelson	2	Eliminated
Origin Dance Crew	Dance	Dance Group	5–18	Nelson	2	Eliminated
James Lee	Singing	Singer	31	Auckland	2	Finalist
Calista Gray	Singing	Singer	14	Tauranga	3	Eliminated
Silhouette	Dance	Dance Duo	—	Christchurch	3	Runner-up
Siuleo Vitale	Singing	Singer	—	Auckland	3	Eliminated
Manako and Cinnamon	Variety	Dog Act	6	Auckland	3	Eliminated
Ethan Scharneck	Dance	Dancer	10	North Shore	3	Finalist
Moxie	Dance	Dance Group	15–26	Albany	4	Eliminated
John Vaifale	Dance	Dancer	17	Manukau	4	Eliminated
All Star Cheerleading	Variety	Cheerleading Group	9–25	North Shore	4	Eliminated
Rob Innes	Singing	Singer	66	Wellington	4	Finalist
Cruize Karaitiana	Singing	Singer	22	Masterton	4	Finalist
Geordie Meade	Singing	Singer	28	Auckland	5	Eliminated
OKK (Ordinary Kids Krew)	Dance	Dance Group	8–44	Turangi	5	Eliminated
Oceana Olsen	Singing	Singer	10	Christchurch	5	Finalist
Kurt X (Kurt Mueller)	Variety	Harmonica Player	50	Wellington	5	Eliminated
Jenny Mitchell	Singing	Singer	14	Gore	5	Third place
IDentity	Dance	Dance Group	18–26	Auckland	6	Finalist
Natasha Alexandra	Singing	Singer	16	Auckland	6	Eliminated
Sam Francks	Singing	Opera Singer	12	Auckland	6	Finalist
Estella Winnie-McGee	Singing	Singer	16	New Plymouth	6	Eliminated
The Black Trio	Singing	Singing Trio	26–29	Wanganui	6	Finalist

== Semi-final summary ==
Key	Judges' choice	Buzzed out	Won the public vote	Won the judges' vote	Lost the judges' vote

=== First Semi-Final, Week 1 (20 October) ===
Order	Contestant	Judges' choices			Finished
Order	Contestant	Kerrison	Hunter	Judd	Finished
1	50/50 Dance Crew				
2	Renee Maurice				Won Public Vote
3	Ravi				
4	This Is Unicycling				
5	Mayo				Won Judges Vote
6	Diamond Divas				Lost Judges Vote

=== Second Semi-Final, Week 2 (27 October) ===
- Guest performer: Clara van Wel – "Wait For Me"

Order	Contestant	Judges' choices			Finished
Order	Contestant	Kerrison	Hunter	Judd	Finished
1	MDM				
2	Brian and Sarah				Won Public Vote
3	Gabriella Atkinson				
4	Origin Dance Crew				Lost Judges Vote
5	James Lee				Won Judges Vote

=== Third Semi-Final, Week 3 (3 November) ===
- Guest performer: Ezra Vine "Celeste"

Order	Contestant	Judges' choices			Finished
Order	Contestant	Kerrison	Hunter	Judd	Finished
1	Calista Gray				
2	Silhouette				Won Judges Vote
3	Siuleo Vitale				Lost Judges Vote
4	Manako and Cinnamon				
5	Ethan Scharneck				Won Public Vote

=== Fourth Semi-Final, Week 4 (10 November) ===
Order	Contestant	Judges' choices			Finished
Order	Contestant	Kerrison	Hunter	Judd	Finished
1	Moxie				
2	John Vaifale				Lost Judges Vote
3	All Star Cheerleading				
4	Rob Innes				Won Judges Vote
5	Cruize Karaitiana				Won Public Vote

=== Fifth Semi-Final, Week 5 (17 November) ===
Guest performer: Sol3 Mio

Order	Contestant	Judges' choices			Finished
Order	Contestant	Kerrison	Hunter	Judd	Finished
1	Geordie Meade				Lost Judges Vote
2	OKK (Ordinary Kids Krew)				
3	Oceana Olsen				Won Judges Vote
4	KurtX				
5	Jenny Mitchell				Won Public Vote

=== Sixth Semi-Final, Week 6 (24 November) ===
Guest performer: Olly Murs – "Dear Darlin'"

Order	Contestant	Judges' choices			Finished
Order	Contestant	Kerrison	Hunter	Judd	Finished
1	IDentity				Won Judges Vote
2	Natasha Alexandra				
3	Sam Francks				Won Judges Vote
4	Estella Winnie-McGee				
5	The Black Trio				Won Public Vote

- Judge Rachel Hunter was unable to choose between IDentity and Sam Francks, declaring she wanted both acts to go through. This decision was accepted.

== Grand Final, Week 7 (1 – 8 December) ==
The two-hour grand final was broadcast on 1 December with the results show on 8 December.

- Guest performers:
  - The Babysitters Circus feat. Jason Kerrison – "Giving Love"
  - Criss Judd dance performance – "When I Was Your Man"
  - ENZSO feat. Jason Kerrison – "Poor Boy"
- Contestant performances:
  - Jenny, Renee and Silhouette – "Next to Me"
  - Rejected auditionees medley

Artist	Order	Act	Finished
Silhouette	1	Dance Duo	2
Jenny Mitchell	2	Singer	3
Cruize Karaitiana	3	Singer	6
Brian and Sarah	4	Dance Duo	5
IDentity	5	Dance Group	8
Sam Francks	6	Opera Singer	10
Oceana Olsen	7	Singer	4
Mayo	8	Dancer	12
James Lee	9	Singer	9
Ethan Scharneck	10	Dancer	11
The Black Trio	11	Singing Trio	13
Rob Innes	12	Singer	7
Renee Maurice	13	Singer	1
