= New Zealand's Got Talent series 1 =

New Zealand's Got Talent
- Series 1
- Hosted by: Andrew Mulligan; Jason Reeves
- Judges: Richard Driver; Miriama Smith; Paul Ellis
- Winner: Chaz Cummings
- Runner-up: TMC

Release
- Original network: Prime
- Original release: 8 September – 28 October 2008

Series chronology
- Next → Series 2

The first series of New Zealand's Got Talent began airing on Prime on 8 September 2008 and ran to 28 October 2008. It consisted of 13 episodes.

In March 2008, Prime announced it was producing a version of New Zealand's Got Talent, in conjunction with South Pacific Pictures and FremantleMedia, with a grand prize of NZ$100,000.

In June, actress Miriama Smith was announced as the first of the show's three judges, and television presenter Andrew Mulligan and radio host Jason Reeves were announced as the show's two presenters. In July, the final two judges were announced - former NZ Idol judge Paul Ellis and former Radio With Pictures presenter and television producer Richard Driver.

It was the first and only series of New Zealand's Got Talent produced by Prime. The series had not delivered expected advertising revenue and in 2009, the network confirmed that they would not produce any further series. Subsequent to the series lackluster performance, the franchise rights were acquired by TVNZ for a more successful second series run in 2012.

== Auditions ==
The audition process started in May 2008 with an initial registration period for applicants. The top applicants were then invited to the judges auditions rounds in Auckland, Wellington and Christchurch in August. The series started with highlights from the judges shows, one episode per location, starting on Monday 8 September. From this round, the judges chose 32 contestants to go through to the semi-finals.

== Semi-finals ==
There were four semi-finals with eight contestants in each show. Starting 29 September, the pre-recorded performance show screened on Mondays nights, followed by the live results show on Tuesday nights.

Key	Judges' choice	Won the public vote	Won the judges' vote	Lost the judges' vote

=== Semi-final 1 (29 September) ===
Order	Contestant	Act	Judges' choices			Finished
Order	Contestant	Act	Driver	Smith	Ellis	Finished
1	The Mini Me’s	Dance Group				Lost Judges Vote
2	Olaf John	Singer				Eliminated
3	Jeremy Ainsley	Juggler				Eliminated
4	Edward Owen	Singer				Eliminated
5	Americus Wilson	Hula Hoop Act				Won Judges Vote
6	Fiddlelore	Band				Eliminated
7	Diflair	Flair Bartenders				Eliminated
8	Chaz Cummings	Dancer				Won Public Vote

=== Semi-final 2 (6 October) ===
Order	Contestant	Act	Judges' choices			Finished
Order	Contestant	Act	Driver	Smith	Ellis	Finished
1	All Star Cheerleaders	Cheerleading Group				Eliminated
2	Caleb Jago-Ward	Singer				Eliminated
3	Chelsea and Quest	Dog Act				Won Judges Vote
4	Strungout	Musicians				Eliminated
5	Ruth Pearce	Dancer				Lost Judges Vote
6	Kent Isomura	Pianist				Eliminated
7	Gaylene Stewart	Singer				Won Public Vote
8	Andre Vegas	Magician				Eliminated

=== Semi-final 3 (13 October) ===
Order	Contestant	Act	Judges' choices			Finished
Order	Contestant	Act	Driver	Smith	Ellis	Finished
1	Melissa Nordhaus	Singer				Eliminated
2	Ease	Singing Group				Won Judges Vote
3	TMC (That Mean Crew)	Dance Group				Won Public Vote
4	Foolish Honey	Acrobat				Eliminated
5	Caitlin Turner	Singer				Eliminated
6	Legacy	Dance Group				Lost Judges Vote
7	Seamus	Sword Swallower				Eliminated
8	Leo Barnett	Singer				Eliminated

=== Semi-final 4 (20 October) ===
Order	Contestant	Act	Judges' choices			Finished
Order	Contestant	Act	Driver	Smith	Ellis	Finished
1	Jai n Mel	Acrobat Duo				Eliminated
2	Joshy	Beatboxer				Won Public Vote
3	HymnChiDivah	Singing Group				Eliminated
4	Coral Pitcher	Singer				Lost Public Vote
5	Tim Pekamu	Harmonica Player				Won Judges Vote
6	Penelope Muir	Singer				Eliminated
7	Gabru Ground Shakers	Dance Group				Eliminated
8	Sticks	Percussion Group				Eliminated

== Final (27 October) ==
The finals performances took place on Monday 27 October with the results revealed on Tuesday 28 October. As well as the performances from each of the finalists, each judge invited back a previously eliminated contestant. They were singer Paton Jacinto, pianist Kent Isomura and singer Melissa Nordhouse.

Order	Contestant	Act	Finished
1	TMC (That Mean Crew)	Dance Group	2
2	Ease	Singing Group	7
3	Chelsea and Quest	Dog Act	8
4	Americus Wilson	Hula Hoop Act	5
5	Joshy	Beatboxer	4
6	Chaz Cummings	Dancer	1
7	Tim Pekamu	Harmonica Player	6
8	Gaylene Stewart	Singer	3
