= New Zealand's Got Talent series 2 =

New Zealand's Got Talent
- Series 2
- Hosted by: Tāmati Coffey
- Judges: Jason Kerrison; Rachel Hunter; Ali Campbell
- Winner: Clara van Wel
- Runner-up: Jessie Hillel

Release
- Original network: TVNZ
- Original release: 9 September – 2 December 2012

Series chronology
- ← Previous; Series 1 Next → Series 3

The second series of New Zealand's Got Talent aired on TV One on 9 September 2012 and ended on 2 December 2012. The series was won by 15-year-old singer-songwriter Clara van Wel from Blenheim who performed her own song "Where Do You Find Love?". 11-year-old singer Jessie Hillel from Wellington was the runner-up, with 17-year-old singer-songwriter Evan Sinton from Auckland in third place.

Contestants competed for the grand prize of NZ$100,000 cash and a 2013 Toyota Corolla car. In addition, winner Clara van Wel was signed to Sony Music New Zealand, with a single of "Where Do You Find Love?" due to be released five days after she was announced the winner, and an album scheduled for February 2013.

In April 2013, Sony Music New Zealand released runner-up Jessie Hillel's full-length debut album With Love, which peaked at number three in the New Zealand Top 40 and number two in the New Zealand Top 20 charts.

== Background ==
In February 2012, Television New Zealand announced it was producing a version of New Zealand's Got Talent, which would screen later in the year on TV One. At the same time New Zealand broadcast funding agency NZ On Air committed to NZ$1.6 million of funding for the production of 14 episodes of 60 minutes each. New Zealand's Got Talent had last screened in 2008 on Prime.

== Host and judges ==
Series 2 judges

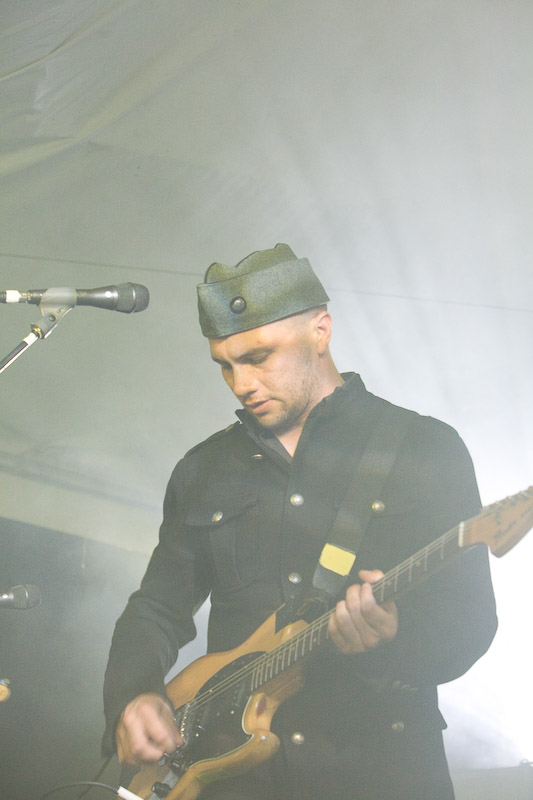
Jason Kerrison

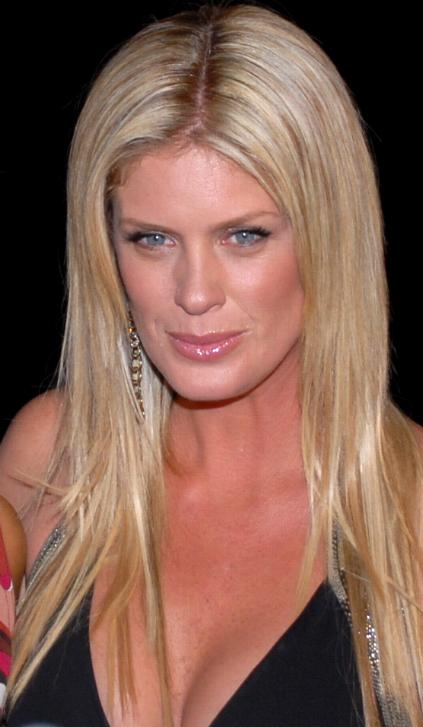
Rachel Hunter

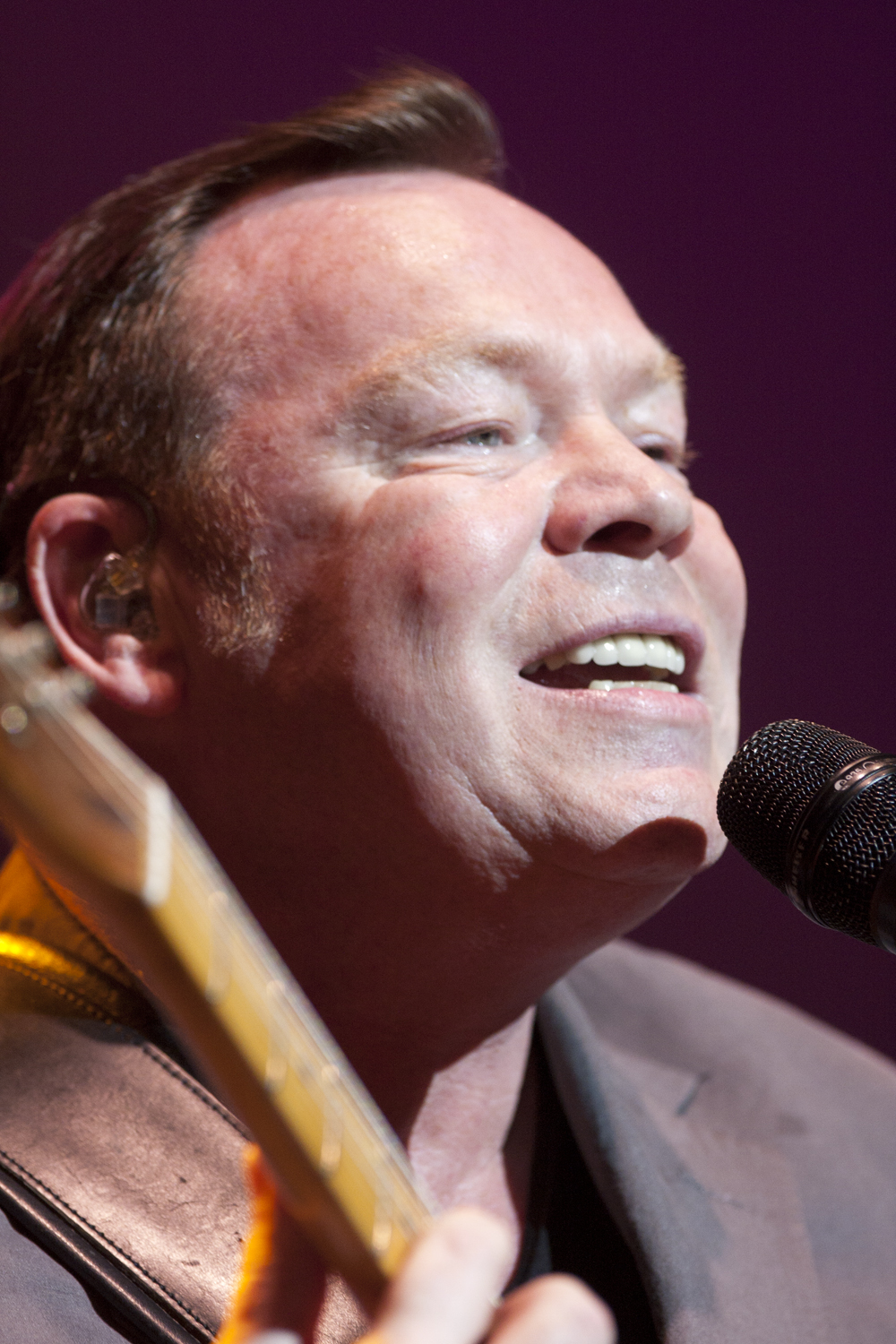
Ali Campbell

In April 2012, Breakfast weather presenter Tāmati Coffey was announced as the show's host and in June 2012 the show's three judges were named as supermodel Rachel Hunter, Opshop singer-songwriter Jason Kerrison and former UB40 lead singer Ali Campbell.

== Auditions ==
The initial phase of open auditions was called the Toyota Talent Tour. In May and early June 2012, the show's producers toured around New Zealand towns and cities and held non-televised open auditions, where more than 5000 applicants auditioned. The audition locations were Invercargill, Dunedin, Timaru, Christchurch, Greymouth, Nelson, New Plymouth, Wellington, Napier, Hamilton, Rotorua, Tauranga, Whangārei and Auckland. The top 200 applicants then went through to the judges auditions.

=== Judges auditions ===
The judges auditions took place in Dunedin at the Regent Theatre on 14 and 15 July, in Wellington at the St James Theatre on 21 and 22 July and in Auckland at the TelstraClear Pacific Events Centre on 25–28 July. The first episode aired on 9 September, starting five weeks of audition episodes which included footage from all three audition locations. After the judges auditions, the successful contestants were further reduced down to a group of 30 for the semi-finals.

==== Semi-finals ====
There were six semi-finals, with the first episode broadcast on 14 October. The semi-finals were pre-recorded the Wednesday before broadcast at the City Impact Church in Albany, Auckland. The winners of each week's semi-final were revealed at the beginning of the next week's episode.

Three semi-finalists had also appeared in the semi-finals of the first series of New Zealand's Got Talent in 2008: Andre Vegas and Company, Dogmatic (as Chelsea and Quest) and the All Star Cheerleaders (with a different line-up).

=== Wildcard ===
In addition to the 30 semi-finalists, one wildcard entry was chosen by a public competition. The Head & Shoulders Above the Rest competition was open to any act who had previously auditioned. Acts uploaded a video to the Above the Rest website and were voted on by the public. The top five contestants then performed for the judges, who chose singing act Arihia and Tahu to join the line-up of semi-final 6.

=== Semi-finalists ===
Key	Semi-Finalist (lost judges' vote)	Finalist	Winner	Runner-up	Third place

Name	Genre	Act	Age	From	Semi	Position reached
Connor Masseurs	Dance	Dancer	15	Wellington	1	Eliminated
Ari Laine	Singing	Singer	23	Wellington	1	Eliminated
Andre Vegas and Company	Magic	Illusionists	29-48	Ngāruawāhia, Nelson and Gisborne	1	Eliminated
Jessie Hillel	Singing	Singer	11	Wellington	1	Runner-up
Bethany Waugh	Music	Musician	21	Timaru	1	Eliminated
Big Dane	Singing	Singer	22	Hamilton	1	Finalist
Tawaroa Kawana	Singing	Singer	17	Palmerston North	2	Finalist
Chris Olwage	Dance	Dancer	26	Auckland	2	Eliminated
Rosie Roulette	Singing	Singer	19	Christchurch	2	Eliminated
Dogmatic	Animals	Dog Act	4-60	Rotorua	2	Eliminated
Olivia Turner	Singing	Singer	91	Christchurch	2	Finalist
JGeeks	Dance	Dance Group	19-27	Auckland	3	Finalist
Lili Latham	Singing	Singer	22	Whakatane	3	Eliminated
Monica Orbe	Singing	Singer	15	Hamilton	3	Eliminated
Hitmen Percussion	Music	Percussionists	20	Wellington	3	Eliminated
Evan Sinton	Singing	Singer	17	Auckland	3	Third place
Prestige	Dance	Dance Group	21-29	Auckland	4	Eliminated
Kale Simpson	Singing	Singer	17	Waitara	4	Eliminated
William Fairbairn	Singing	Singer	15	Nelson	4	Eliminated
Zane and Degge	Variety	Juggling Duo	19 & 20	Wellington	4	Finalist
Clara van Wel	Singing	Singer	14	Blenheim	4	Winner
All-Star Cheerleaders	Dance	Cheerleading Group	7-22	Auckland	5	Eliminated
Fletcher Oxford	Singing	Singer	12	Tauranga	5	Finalist
Giancarlo and Masha	Dance	Dance Duo	37 & 31	Auckland	5	Eliminated
Jack Fraser	Singing	Singer	20	Invercargill	5	Eliminated
Mihirangi Fleming	Music	Musician	29	Waitara	5	Finalist
Alfred the Circus Nerd	Acrobatics	Acrobat	16	Waitetuna	6	Eliminated
Arihia and Tahu	Singing	Singing Duo	17	South Auckland	6	Eliminated
Dudley Fairbrass	Singing	Singer	19	Canterbury	6	Finalist
Limit Break Dance Crew	Dance	Dance Group	18-25	Auckland	6	Eliminated
Logan Walker	Singing	Singer	18	Auckland	6	Finalist

== Semi-final summary ==
Key	Judges' choice	Buzzed out	Won the public vote	Won the judges' vote	Lost the judges' vote

=== First Semi-Final, Week 1 (14 October) ===
Order	Contestant	Judges' choices			Finished
Order	Contestant	Campbell	Hunter	Kerrison	Finished
1	Big Dane				Won Public Vote
2	Andre Vegas and Company				Eliminated
3	Connor Massuers				Lost Judges Vote
4	Ari Laine				Eliminated
5	Bethany Waugh				Eliminated
6	Jessie Hillel				Won Judges Vote

=== Second Semi-Final, Week 2 (21 October) ===
- Guest performer: Annah Mac - "Bucket"

Order	Contestant	Judges' choices			Finished
Order	Contestant	Campbell	Hunter	Kerrison	Finished
1	Tawaroa Kawana				Won Judges Vote
2	Chris Olwage				Eliminated
3	Rosie Roulette				Eliminated
4	Dogmatic				Lost Judges Vote
5	Olivia Turner				Won Public Vote

=== Third Semi-Final, Week 3 (28 October) ===
- Guest performer: Opshop - "Never Leave Me Again"

Order	Contestant	Judges' choices			Finished
Order	Contestant	Campbell	Hunter	Kerrison	Finished
1	JGeeks				Won Public Vote
2	Lili Latham				Eliminated
3	Monica Orbe				Lost Judges Vote
4	Hitmen Percussion				Eliminated
5	Evan Sinton				Won Judges Vote

=== Fourth Semi-Final, Week 4 (4 November) ===
Order	Contestant	Judges' choices			Finished
Order	Contestant	Campbell	Hunter	Kerrison	Finished
1	Prestige				Lost Judges Vote
2	Kale Simpson				Eliminated
3	William Fairbairn				Eliminated
4	Zane and Degge				Won Judges Vote
5	Clara van Wel				Won Public Vote

=== Fifth Semi-Final, Week 5 (11 November) ===
- Guest performer: Justice Crew - "Boom Boom"

Order	Contestant	Judges' choices			Finished
Order	Contestant	Campbell	Hunter	Kerrison	Finished
1	Fletcher Oxford				Won Public Vote
2	All-Star Cheerleaders				Lost Judges Vote
3	Jack Fraser				Eliminated
4	Giancarlo and Masha				Eliminated
5	Mihirangi Fleming				Won Judges Vote

=== Sixth Semi-Final, Week 6 (18 November) ===
- Guest performer: Delta Goodrem - "Wish You Were Here"

Order	Contestant	Judges' choices			Finished
Order	Contestant	Campbell	Hunter	Kerrison	Finished
1	Limit Break Dance Crew				Eliminated
2	Alfred the Circus Nerd				Eliminated
3	Logan Walker				Won Judges Vote
4	Arihia and Tahu				Lost Judges Vote
5	Dudley Fairbrass				Won Public Vote

== Grand Final, Week 7 (25 November-2 December) ==
The two-hour grand final was broadcast on 25 November with the results show on 2 December.

- Guest performers:
  - Dane Rumble - "Tonight"
  - Ali Campbell - "Maybe Tomorrow"
  - Tāmati Coffey and dancers - "Gangnam Style"
  - Evermore - "Follow the Sun"
- Contestant performances:
  - Rejected auditionees medley: Billy's Big Brass Band (one-man band), Ji-Ye (comedic singer), Ocean Waitokia (yodeller), Russell Gray (dancer), Top Shop (One Direction parody)
  - Clara, Evan and Jessie - "Somebody That I Used to Know"

Artist	Order	Act	Finished
JGeeks	1	Dance Group	4
Fletcher Oxford	2	Singer	5
Olivia Turner	3	Singer	8
Logan Walker	4	Singer	11
Clara van Wel	5	Singer	1
Zane and Degge	6	Juggling Duo	12
Big Dane	7	Singer	6
Tawaroa Kawana	8	Singer	10
Evan Sinton	9	Singer	3
Mihirangi Fleming	10	Musician	7
Dudley Fairbrass	11	Singer	9
Jessie Hillel	12	Singer	2

== Ratings ==
The series consistently rated well, being the most watched show on New Zealand television every week. At the series end, TVNZ revealed it had been the most watched show on New Zealand television in 10 years.
