= Composure =

Composure may refer to:

- Calmness
- Equanimity
- Composure (Waking Ashland album), a 2005 album by Waking Ashland
- Composure, a 2016 album by Maala
- Composure, a 2018 album by Real Friends (band)
- "Composure" (song), a song by August Burns Red
- Composure, a horse that won the 2002 Chandelier Stakes
- Composure, an attribute in Vampire: The Masquerade
