= Jessie Hillel =

Australian singer-songwriter

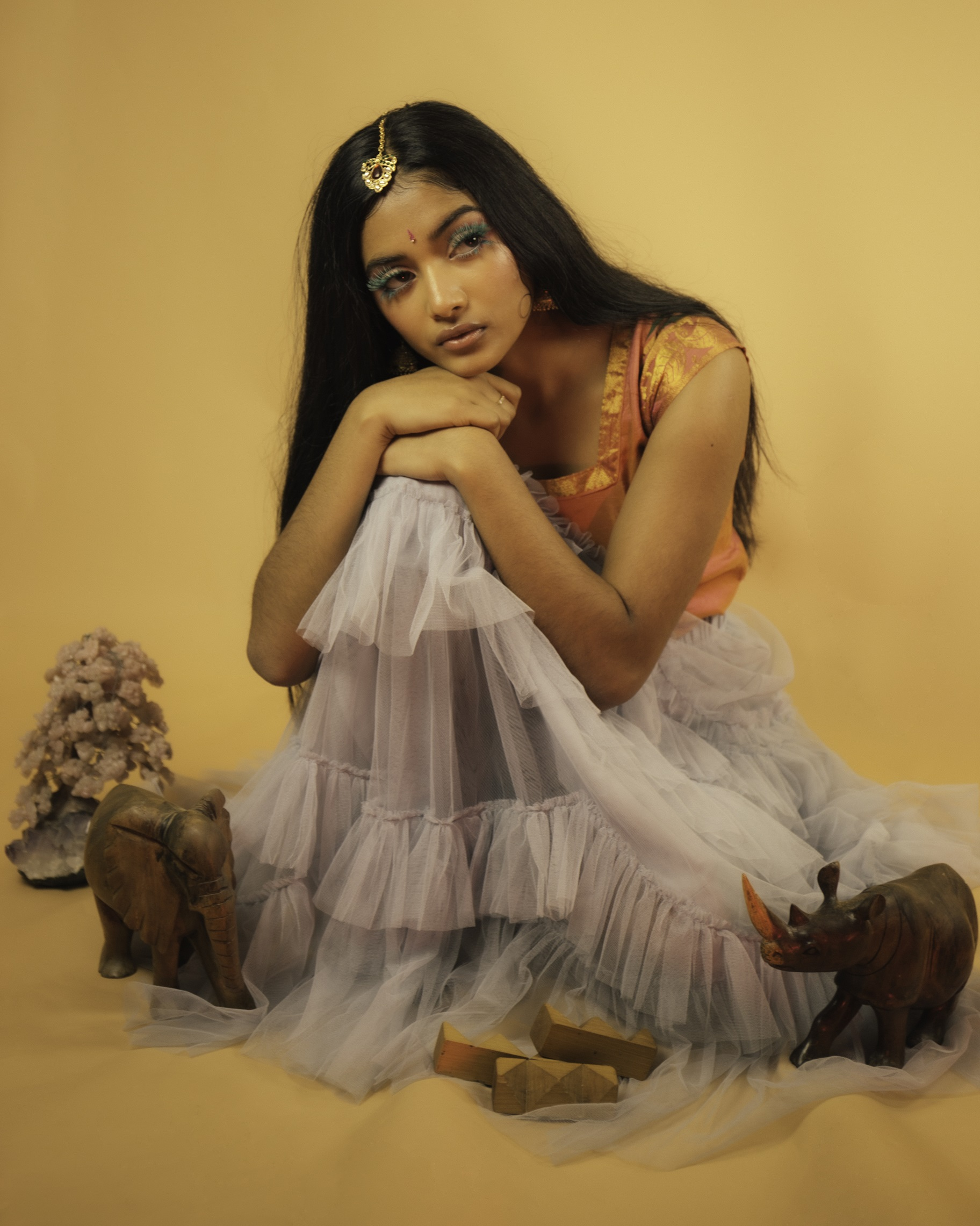
- Hillel in 2021

Background information
- Also known as: JHM
- Born: Jessie Hillel; 2002; Wellington, New Zealand
- Genre: Pop
- Occupations: Singer, songwriter and producer
- Years active: 2008–present
- Labels: Push Records, Sony Music New Zealand
- Website: www.jhmsmusic.com

Jessie Hillel, also known professionally as Jessie Hill and JHM, is a singer, songwriter, and producer based in Melbourne, Australia.

She is known for her runner-up placement in series 2 of New Zealand's Got Talent and her win at the first Fed Live music competition held by Melbourne's Federation Square in association with MTV Australia, Mushroom Records, Melbourne Music Week and Ditto Music to promote upcoming artists in Melbourne.

== Early years ==
As a child, Hillel performed in local shows and contests. She appeared on New Zealand TV2's What Now performing Time to Say Goodbye and on TV1's Find A Star performing "O Mio Babbino Caro". She is featured on the album Kids Sing Bob Dylan, covering popular Bob Dylan songs such as "Mr. Tambourine Man".

== Career ==
=== New Zealand's Got Talent ===
Hillel auditioned for New Zealand's Got Talent series 2 at the age of 10. Her rendition of "Pie Jesu" earned the praise from judges, with Rachel Hunter commenting "You are absolutely stunning." She advanced to the semi-finals and her performance of "O Mio Babbino Caro" earned her a spot in the grand finals on judges' vote. Hillel performed Schubert's version of "Ave Maria" in the finals and ultimately placed second through public vote. "You are mesmerizing, you are enchanting, what you do is enduring" said Jason Kerrison of Hillel's performance in the finals.

Following her success on the show, she performed in shows both in New Zealand and overseas. In 2012, Hillel was invited to Beijing to appear on International Children's Music Festival and her performance of Memory was broadcast by CCTV-1 on New Year's Eve.

In 2013, Hillel was a guest artist at TEDxChristchurch where she performed "Non So Piu" and "Serenade".

=== Recording ===
Hillel's solo debut album With Love was released on April 26, 2014, through Sony Music New Zealand. The album is a collection of classical and opera songs. It peaked at #3 on the NZ Top 20 album chart and at #16 on the NZ Top 40 album chart. The song "Pie Jesu" off the album peaked at #15 on the NZ Top 20 Singles chart.

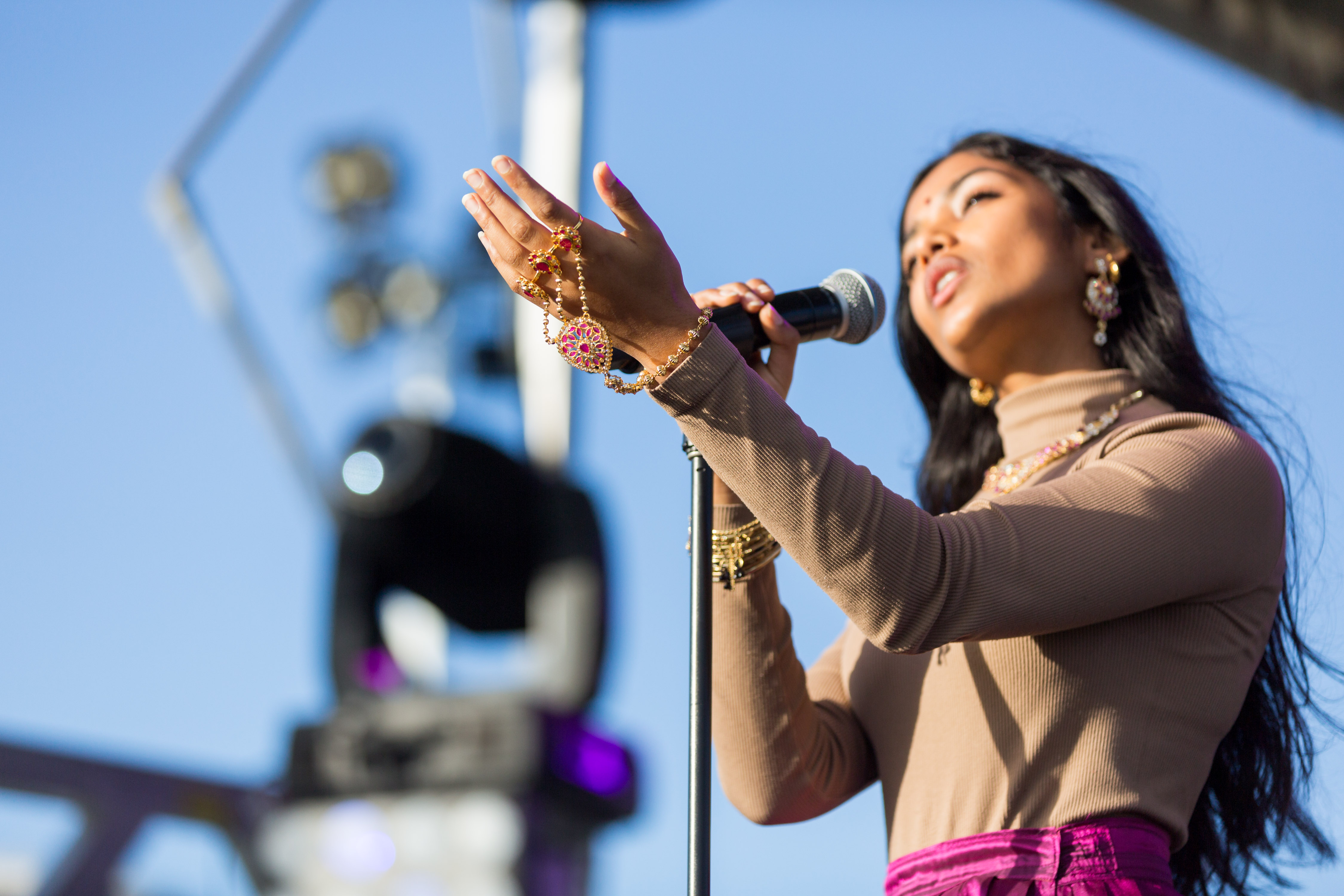
Hillel performing at Southside Live, Melbourne (2022)

She moved to Melbourne, Australia to continue her music aspirations and to take up a scholarship to study music at the Victorian College of the Arts Secondary School. She along with her college mates formed the soul-funk band Jakal, which in 2019 won the Battle of the Bands at the St. Kilda Music Festival. Hillel was the band's lead vocalist and composer.

She was a principal vocalist of Victorian State School Spectacular in 2016 and 2017.

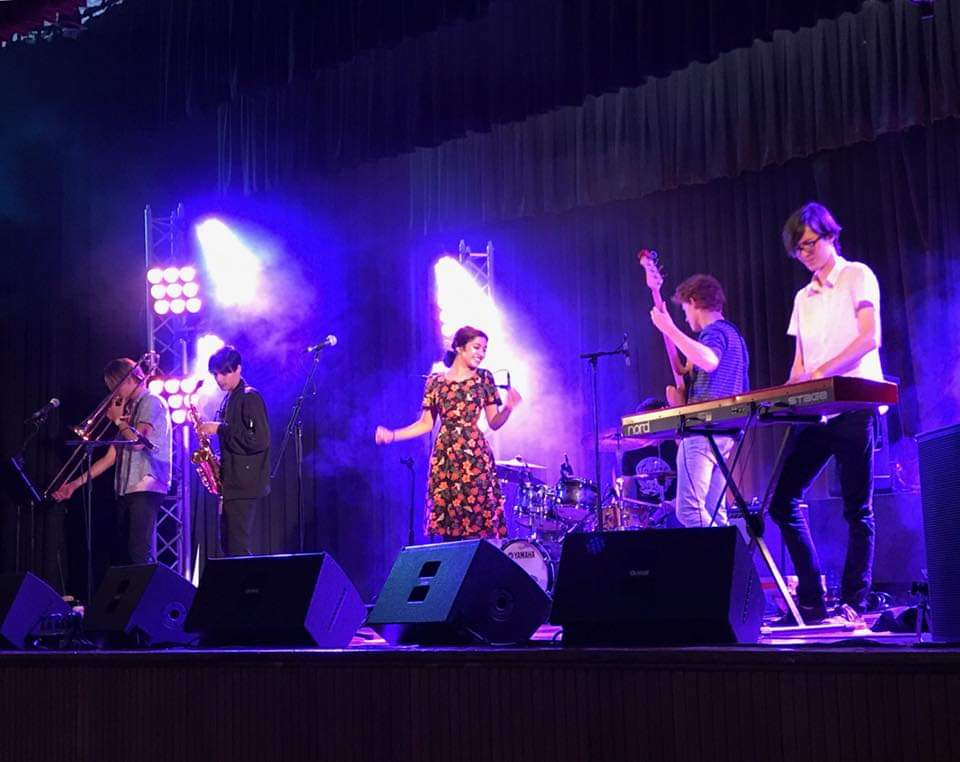
Hillel is performing with the soul/ funk band JAKAL (2018)

In 2020, she was won the first Fed Live music competition for her song "The Rain".

=== Jessie Hill / JHM ===
In 2020, Hillel formed the pop band JHM. The group released the single "Santorini" through Push Records in 2021. The song contains a mix of classical, hip hop rhythms, and orchestral elements.

JHM, working with multi-instrumentalist and producer Fractures, released the song "Fever Dream" in 2023.

In 2024, going by the artist name Jessie Hill, she collaborated with DJ Noiz and released the song "From this moment" that peaked at #14 on NZ Top 20 Hot Singles chart.

== Discography ==
=== Albums ===
List of studio albums, with selected chart positions and certifications
| Title | Peak chart positions | | Album details |
| Title | NZ 20 | NZ 40 | Album details |
|---|---|---|---|
| With Love | 3 | 16 | Released: 26 April 2013; Label: Sony Music; Formats: CD, Digital download |

=== Singles ===
| Year | Title | Details |
|---|---|---|
| 2025 | Folded | Single, Released: 10 October 2025; Jessie Hill, DJ Noiz; Label: Acts Music Group/ FutureNow Music; NZ Top 20 Hot Singles Chart #7 |
| 2025 | Motions | Single, Released: 30 May 2025; Jessie Hill, Jalmar; Label: Acts Music Group |
| 2024 | GMT | Single, Released: 13 December 2024; Jessie Hill, Jalmar; Label: Acts Music Group |
| 2024 | From this moment | Single, Released: 15 November 2024; Jessie Hill, DJ Noiz; Label: Acts Music Group/ FutureNow Music; NZ Top 20 Hot Singles Chart #14 |
| 2023 | Fever Dream | Single, Released: 23 June 2023; JHM, Fractures; Label: Acts Music Group |
| 2021 | Santorini | Single, Released: 9 July 2021; Label: Push Records |
| 2020 | Good Grades | Single, Released: 3 July 2020 |
| 2018 | JAKAL | EP, Released: 18 February 2018; Lead vocalist, composer, Jakal |
| 2013 | With Love | EP, Released: 26 April 2013; Label: Sony Music New Zealand; Peak Chart Positions: NZ Top 40 World Albums Chart #16; NZ Top 20 NZ Albums Chart #3; NZ Top 20 NZ Singles Chart #15 ("Pie Jesu") |
| 2011 | Starbugs - Kids Sing Bob Dylan | EP, Released 10, September 2011; Label: Universal Children's Audio; Vocalist |
