= City Impact =

City Impact Church can refer to:

- City Impact Church New Zealand in Auckland, Mt. Wellington, East Coast Bays, Queenstown, Invercargill, Balclutha
- City Impact Church Canada in Moncton, Bathurst, Fredericton
- City Impact Church Tonga in Tonga
