= Karamū High School =

Location
- Windsor Avenue, Hastings, New Zealand; 39.6467°S 176.8669°E

Information
- Type: Co-ed state secondary (Year 9–13)
- Motto: Knowledge is strength
- Established: 1962
- Ministry of Education Institution no.: 229
- Principal: Dionne Thomas
- Enrolment: 900 (July 2026)
- Socio-economic decile: 4J
- Website: karamu.school.nz

Karamū High School is a co-educational state high school in Hastings, New Zealand for students in Years 9 to 13. The school is the main co-ed secondary school within Hastings City itself. The school’s campus is located to the easternmost end of Hastings City, adjacent to Windsor Park to the west and the Heretaunga Plains’ orchards to the east.

== History ==
Karamū High School opened in 1962. Like many New Zealand secondary schools built in the 1960s, the school was originally built to the Nelson Two-Storey standard plan, characterised by two-storey H-shaped classroom blocks. While Karamū's two Nelson plan classroom blocks were demolished in 2010–11, the school retains its Nelson plan administration/hall block and its Nelson plan library building.

== School life ==
Traditionally the school has always had a strong focus on cultural pursuits. It maintains a good reputation in dance and music competitions and provides a wide range of opportunities to students to this end.

There is also wide participation in extra-curricular sporting activities and the school provides opportunities in over 20 sports with varying levels of success. In recent times the schools top teams in Netball, Rugby and Canoe Polo have enjoyed considerable success.

Karamu’s student body is subdivided in four houses Kaweka (yellow), Tukituki (blue), Te Mata (orange) and Heretaunga (red). The houses are named after local landmarks. The school stages a range of full-school events such as swimming sports, cross-country running, athletic sports and music competitions in which houses compete against each other. The school does not operate a prefect system, however, does appoint a head girl and boy, plus a deputy to each, and other school leaders: Sports Captains, Cultural Leaders, Community Leaders, Academic Leaders, Māori Cultural Leaders and House Leaders.

The high school’s yearbook, ‘Tira Ora,’ is named after a branch of the karamū tree used in Māori ceremonies and produced by a group of students and teachers.

The tira ora also forms the logo of the school itself, appearing in the school badge and on official correspondence.

Karamū High School's current principal is Dionne Thomas.

== Notable alumni ==
- David Butcher (born 1948), former member of parliament
- Steve Chadwick (born 1948), former member of parliament
- Paul Holmes (1950–2013), broadcaster
- Jason Reeves (born 1976), broadcaster
- Keith Trask (born 1960), Olympic gold medallist in rowing
- Meka Whaitiri (born 1965), current member of parliament
- Aimee Fisher (born 1995), Olympian, professional athlete and canoeist
