= Tāmati Coffey =

New Zealand politician

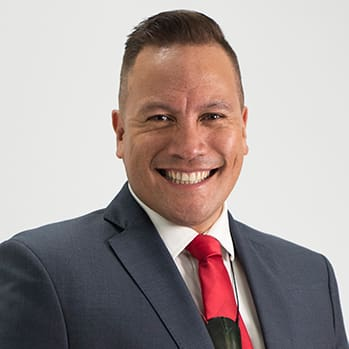
- Coffey in 2020

Member of the New Zealand Parliament for Labour party list
- In office 17 October 2020 – 14 October 2023

Member of the New Zealand Parliament for Waiariki
- In office 23 September 2017 – 17 October 2020
- Preceded by: Te Ururoa Flavell
- Succeeded by: Rawiri Waititi
- Majority: 1,719

Personal details
- Born: Tamati Gerald Coffey; 19 September 1979 (age 47) Lower Hutt, New Zealand
- Party: Labour
- Spouse: Tim Smith
- Children: 2
- Occupation: Politician, broadcaster

Tāmati Gerald Coffey (born 19 September 1979) is a New Zealand broadcaster, politician, and former Member of Parliament.

As a broadcaster, Coffey presented television programmes such as What Now, Breakfast, and New Zealand's Got Talent. He was a Member of Parliament for the New Zealand Labour Party for six years from 2017 to 2023.

== Early life and family ==
Coffey's parents are Gerald (Ngāti Porou, Ngāti Awa) and Rangi (Ngāti Whakaue, Tūhourangi, Ngāti Tūwharetoa). He has two older sisters. Coffey was raised in Lower Hutt and attended Onslow College. Coffey's parents were both factory workers and encouraged him to continue with his education. He was the first in his family to complete high school and attend university, and he earned an honours degree in political science from the University of Auckland in 2003. While at Auckland, he was president of the Māori Students Association.

Coffey came out as gay during a 2009 interview with Woman's Weekly and said that he lives with his long-term boyfriend, Tim Smith, a former music teacher from northern England. The couple announced their engagement on 16 February 2011 and wed in a civil union on 29 December 2011. They have two children born by surrogacy in 2019 and 2023. New Zealand surrogacy laws required the couple to carry out a legal adoption process between them and the surrogate mother. Coffey is also the biological father of Kiritapu Allan's daughter.

As of 2023, Coffey lives in Rotorua.

== Television career ==
Coffey was hired as a presenter of the long-running children's weekend programme What Now in 2004. While most of the programme was broadcast live from Christchurch, Coffey travelled around New Zealand and broadcast live segments from non-studio locations in other cities and smaller towns. Coffey's co-presenters included Carolyn Taylor, Virginie LeBrun, and Vicki Lin. He continued with What Now until August 2007, when he joined the weekday morning news programme Breakfast as its first dedicated roving weather presenter. He finished with Breakfast in December 2012 in order to move to England with his partner, and was succeeded by Sam Wallace.

While appearing on Breakfast, Coffey competed in and won season 5 of Dancing with the Stars. Partnered with Samantha Hitchcock, Coffey won the series final on 21 April 2009. Coffey's charity was Rainbow Youth, an organisation that supports gay youth.

As part of series seven of the TVNZ show Intrepid Journeys, which aired on 20 January 2011, Coffey travelled to Oman on the Arabian Peninsula for three weeks. Coffey is seen engaging in activities including mountain climbing, turtle nesting, dhow fishing cruises and souk shopping.

Coffey was also the host of New Zealand's Got Talent in 2012 and 2013, and a fill-in presenter for current affairs programme Seven Sharp in late 2013.

=== Filmography ===
Year	Title	Role	Notes
2004–07	What Now	Roving presenter	
2007–12	Breakfast	Roving weather presenter	
2009	Dancing with the Stars	Celebrity contestant	Winner
2011	Intrepid Journeys	Celebrity guest	1 episode: Arabian Peninsula
2012–13	New Zealand's Got Talent	Presenter	
2017	Moving Out with Tāmati	Presenter	
2019	Sunday	Guest	1 episode
2024	Celebrity Treasure Island 2024	Himself	TVNZ

== Political career ==
New Zealand Parliament
Years	Term	Electorate	List	Party
2017–2020	52nd	Waiariki	35	Labour
2020–2023	53rd	List	37	Labour

Coffey is a member of the New Zealand Labour Party. In a 2017 interview, he explained that his family had always been Labour, except during the foreshore and seabed controversy. Coffey said his return to the Labour Party was drawn from dissatisfaction with the Māori Party's support of the Fifth National Government, as well as Labour's track record on gay rights, including homosexual law reform, civil unions, and same-sex marriage.

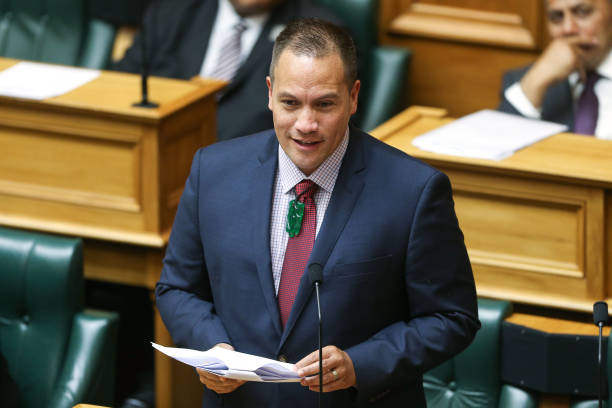
Coffey delivering his maiden speech in Parliament, 8 November 2017

On 29 March 2014, Coffey was selected as the Labour Party's candidate for the Rotorua electorate at the 2014 New Zealand general election. He was also placed 30th on the Labour list. He failed to unseat the National Party incumbent Todd McClay, and was not high enough on the list to get a seat in Parliament.

=== First term, 2017–2020 ===
In 2016, he was selected by Labour for the Waiariki Māori electorate for the 2017 general election and was ranked 35th on the Labour party list. He defeated Māori Party leader Te Ururoa Flavell in Waiariki by a margin of 1,321 and was elected to Parliament for the first time. In his first term, he was a member of the Finance and Expenditure Committee and the deputy chair of the Economic Development, Science and Innovation Committee.

=== Second term, 2020–2023 ===
During the 2020 New Zealand general election held on 17 October, Coffey narrowly lost the Waiariki electorate to Māori Party candidate Rawiri Waititi based on preliminary results. Coffey did not concede until the release of the final results on 6 November. The final results confirmed that Coffey had lost to Waititi by a margin of 836 votes. Despite this loss, Coffey was re-elected to Parliament on the Labour Party list. In his second term, he was the chair of the Māori Affairs Committee until March 2023, when he became deputy chair.

==== Māori wards in Rotorua ====
In April 2022, Coffey introduced the Rotorua District Council (Representation Arrangements) Bill on behalf of the Rotorua Lakes Council. The bill sought to introduce three Māori wards to the council. Due to the Local Electoral Act 2001, the council had not been able to establish a governing arrangement that would include "adequate" Māori representation without a law change. The Local Electoral Act requires Māori wards and general wards to be weighted to their respective populations, while the council's bill proposed equal membership of Māori and non-Māori councillors. The bill passed its first reading on 6 April 2022 and was referred to the Māori Affairs Committee, which Coffey chaired. While the Labour, Green and Māori parties supported the bill, the opposition National and ACT parties opposed it.

In late April 2022, the Attorney General David Parker issued a report under the New Zealand Bill of Rights Act 1990 which stated that the bill discriminated against general roll voters by allocating more seats to Māori ward voters disproportionate to their share of the local population. At the time, Rotorua's general roll had 55,600 voters while its Māori roll had 21,700 voters. In response, Māori Development Minister Willie Jackson and Deputy Prime Minister Grant Robertson withdrew their support for Coffey's bill. The National Party's justice spokesperson Paul Goldsmith claimed that the bill breached the principle of "equal suffrage" by giving Maori electoral roll votes twice the value of general roll votes. By contrast, Māori Party co-leader Rawiri Waititi defended Coffey's Rotorua Bill, claiming that it accorded equal representation to Māori. In late April 2022, Coffey and the Rotorua Lakes Council agreed to "pause" the bill's select committee process in order to address the legal issues raised by the Attorney General. After the 2022 local elections, the reconstituted Lakes Council council voted to withdraw its support for the bill in February 2023.

==== Surrogacy reform ====
As a father of children born via surrogacy, Coffey took an interest in legislating for surrogacy reform. In 2021, his private member's bill, the Improvement Arrangements for Surrogacy Bill was introduced to Parliament. The bill passed its first reading unanimously in May 2022 and referred to the Health Committee. The early legislative stages of the bill ran contemporaneously with a Law Commission review of surrogacy law that had been commissioned by the Government in 2020 and was reported in May 2022, nine days after Coffey's bill passed its first reading. The report made 63 recommendations to establish a new framework for determining legal parenthood in surrogacy arrangements, and the Law Commission separately recommended to the Health Committee that Coffey's bill, as drafted, not proceed in favour of the Government progressing the Commission's own recommendations for surrogacy reform. The bill was adopted by the Government in May 2023. The Health Committee, which considered the Bill alongside the Law Commission's recommendations, issued interim reports on the bill in October 2022 and August 2023.

In October 2022, Coffey stated that he hoped that the surrogacy reform bill would pass into law before the end of the 53rd New Zealand Parliament, although this was ultimately not achieved. Coffey stated that "more and more couples are having kids this way, so the law needs to be changed to streamline this process."

==== Housing ====
Coffey also took an interest in housing in Rotorua and the Waiariki electorate. By March 2023, Coffey claimed credit for building 260 state homes, with 300 more on the way. He claimed that these measures reduced the number of people living in emergency housing by half compared with 2022. Former Mayor of Rotorua Steve Chadwick credited Coffey with securing NZ$300 million in funding from the Government for housing and regional development in the Rotorua district.

==== 2023 general election ====
Coffey announced his intention to retire from Parliament at the 2023 election in March of that year, but in July was announced as the new candidate for East Coast, replacing Kiri Allan. He had been ranked 36th on the Labour party list. Coffey does not live in the East Coast electorate but stated his intention to move to Gisborne if he won. He lost to National candidate Dana Kirkpatrick by a margin of 3,199 votes. Labour did not poll highly enough for Coffey to return as a list MP.

== Business career ==
Following the 2014 election Coffey elected not to seek a new broadcasting role with TVNZ, instead going into business opening a bar in Rotorua's Eat Street with his partner Tim Smith. Their bar was designed to give Rotorua the atmosphere of Ponsonby, Auckland; the name of the bar being Ponsonby Road. It became a popular nightspot for several years.

In 2018, they bought a neighbouring restaurant and rebranded it as a Kiwi-style restaurant called Our House. Both restaurants became accredited living wage employers. In 2021, Ponsonby Rd closed and was rebranded as a cocktail and wine restaurant called Rotorua International but proved financially unprofitable. Both Eat Street businesses were sold in December 2022.

== Community service ==
In 2016, Coffey was elected to the Rotorua Energy Charitable Trust, winning the highest number of votes (5,125). By 2017, Coffey had become the Trust's deputy chair. In November 2022, Coffey lost his bid to be re-elected for a third term on the Rotorua Trust.

New Zealand Parliament
Preceded by Te Ururoa Flavell	Member of Parliament for Waiariki; 2017–2020	Succeeded by Rawiri Waititi
