= Jordon Saffron Taste This! =

Jordon Saffron: Taste This!
- Theatrical poster
- Directed by: Sergio Myers
- Story by: Sergio Myers
- Produced by: Sergio Myers; Nicole Davis
- Starring: Rachel Hunter; Steve Schirripa; Sergio Myers; Kinga Philipps
- Cinematography: Lenny Manfred; Adam Novak
- Edited by: Bryan Keith; Darren Porter
- Distributed by: RMS Entertainment
- Release date: September 18, 2009 (USA)
- Running time: 87 minutes
- Country: United States
- Language: English

Jordon Saffron: Taste This! is a 2009 American mockumentary directed by Sergio Myers, creator of MTV's Sorority Life. Rather than being a scripted film, all the scenes were improvised using a story concept created by Myers. The film stars Steve Schirripa, Rachel Hunter, and Sergio Myers in a story about an egotistical chef (loosely based on Gordon Ramsay) who had made it big in Hollywood, only to lose his restaurant, his restaurant partner, his girlfriend, and his ability to taste.

== Background ==
The film was shot over a period of seven days, and made using a concept director Myers refers to as "Free Flow Filmmaking", with which a filmmaker would "write with the camera", allowing them freedom in not being tied to a specific script or location and in being able to shoot economically. For actress Rachel Hunter, Myers gave story line, background, and motivation. Through improvisation, all of her scenes were done in one take. For Steve Schirippa, Myers used one cameraman, natural lighting, and shot all Schirripa's scenes in a couple of hours, again, all scenes done in one take. Meyers chose Chicago as the film background as he felt it was "a great location that gives great production value without paying for it."

== Plot ==
Jordon Saffron (Sergio Myers), is an egotistical chef whose secret use of saffron as an orgasmic ingredient in his recipes, has gained him fame in Hollywood. After years of ego and partying and not enough actual cooking, Saffron loses everything... his TV show, his girlfriend Nikki (Rachel Hunter), his famous restaurant, and his business partner Louie (Steve Schirripa). Topping his woes is that he also loses his ability to taste food. Defeated in life, he returns to his home town of Chicago and reconnects with Audry, the true love he left behind. He takes a job at his father's pizzeria, and in his quest to recapture his former renown, and learn how his life went so wrong, he visits a flamboyant psychic, an acupuncturist, and a psychiatrist... events which result in him engaged in a cook-off with the Spam King of Chicago... his old rival, Kimmel (Jock L. Schloss).

== Cast ==
- Rachel Hunter as Nikki
- Steve Schirripa as Louie
- Sergio Myers as Jordon Saffron
- Kinga Philipps as Entertainment Reporter
- Matthew Cohen as Friend of critic
- Nicole Davis as Dr. Drew
- Steven Ford as Sammy
- Ekaterina Klimova as Cookoff announcer
- Brandee Baker as Sasha
- Melvin Doerr Jr. as Psychic
- Anna Hagopian as Audrey
- Sotelo Leoncio as Leo
- Dimitry Mignon as Jean Claude
- Jock L. Schloss as Kimmel

== Reception ==
=== Critical response ===
LA Weekly made note that while director Sergio Myers understands reality TV, and opted for improved action rather than scripted dialog, they judged the film to be a "limp satire of egomaniacal celebrity chefs", that was "raucously funny during Saffron’s professional and personal meltdowns," but they found major flaws in the repetition of the film's jokes, the strange accents used by its characters, and the overuse of reality TV style, which "bring down the whole affair."

Blogcritics offered that many actors are uncomfortable with improved scenes, and that as Saffron’s sous chef, Jean Claude, Dimitry Mignon handled the task particularly well. Thy also noted that as Louie, Saffron’s business partner, Steve Schirripa stole the show in that Schirripa in "his displays of anger and frustration, is the most sympathetic—and convincingly real—of the characters." They found much of the acting to be believable, but offered that the film overall as a mockumentary was "a little uneven, missing some things one expects from that form, and including some that don’t work within it." The felt that director Meyers would have been better of "foregoing the mockumentary tag, and calling this an improvisational piece." They concluded "It’s a humorous film about a character who is not all that sympathetic. Disliking Jordan Saffron is part of the fun."

Are You Screening? found the film's premise to be promising but gone "horribly wrong" when the film displayed the "production abilities of really nice student film, and the comedic talents of a drunken night at a fraternity goofing on a Hell's Kitchen marathon." He noted that the film attempted a level of credibility by its inclusion of Steve Schirripa and Rachel Hunter in the cast, but that it failed in that it "ultimately comes down to a lot of ideas that are funny, but it doesn't deliver anything that lives up to the potential in those ideas."

=== Accolades ===
- 2009, Won Leading Actor Award of Merit for Sergio Myers at Accolade Awards
- 2009, Won Feature Film Award of Merit at Accolade Awards
- 2009, Won Award of Distinction at Communicator Awards
- 2010, nomination for BIFFY Award for Best Feature Film at Beloit International Film Festival
- 2010, Won Telly Award for Entertainment
- 2010, Won Telly Award for Use of Humor

The Academy of Motion Picture Arts and Sciences asked for a copy of the film for historical purposes.

== Release ==
Jordon Saffron: Taste This! was released in North America on DVD through Netflix and Movie Blockbuster. Internationally it was released through Synergetic Distribution.
