= Come Dine with Me New Zealand =

- Narrated by: Guy Williams
- Country of origin: New Zealand
- Original language: English
- No. of series: 1
- No. of episodes: 40

Production
- Executive producers: Emma White; Greg Heathcote
- Producer: Nicole Horan
- Running time: 30 minutes

Original release
- Network: TV3
- Release: 15 June – 7 August 2015

Come Dine with Me New Zealand is a New Zealand television reality programme, based on the UK's Come Dine with Me. Narrated by comedian Guy Williams, it premiered on TV3 on 15 June 2015, with the final episode airing on 7 August 2015. Originally planned to air in the late afternoon, it instead aired at 7–7:30 pm each weeknight, from two weeks after the discontinuation of 3 News' former current affairs show, Campbell Live, until the launch of Story, its new current affairs show. In November 2015, MediaWorks decided not to renew the series.

== Format ==
Throughout five episodes, aired Monday–Friday, contestants took turns to host a dinner party and marked the other contestants out of 10. The winner of each week won $2000; where there is a tie for first place (as happened in the fifth week), the two winners got $1000 each.

== Episodes ==
Contestants are organised from left to right in the order they hosted their dinner parties. The winner or winners of each week are highlighted in green.

Week	Episodes	Premiered	Location	Contestants				
1	1–5	15 June 2015	Auckland	Monika	Hinemoa	Tony	Sarah	Kyle
2	6–10	22 June 2015	Auckland	Anoushka Numans	Victoria Neali	Natasha Wiseman	Charlotte Cake	Kelvin Taylor
3	11–15	29 June 2015	Auckland	Jemima Horne	Khalid	Eds	Ally	Anne-Marie
4	16–20	6 July 2015	Auckland	Tabea von Grünewaldt	Prabha	Lily	Philby	Dirk
5	21–25	13 July 2015	Auckland	Dale	Nayfe	Kim Mayhead	Keita	Di
6	26–30	20 July 2015	Auckland	Grayson	Anita	Damon	Laurel	Brodie
7	31–35	27 July 2015	Christchurch	Donna	Tess Hilliam	Kathy Gillatt	Pete	Arielle Garcino
8	36–40	3 August 2015	Christchurch	Louise	Jason	Mel	Jesse	Monika
