= Clara van Wel =

New Zealand singer-songwriter

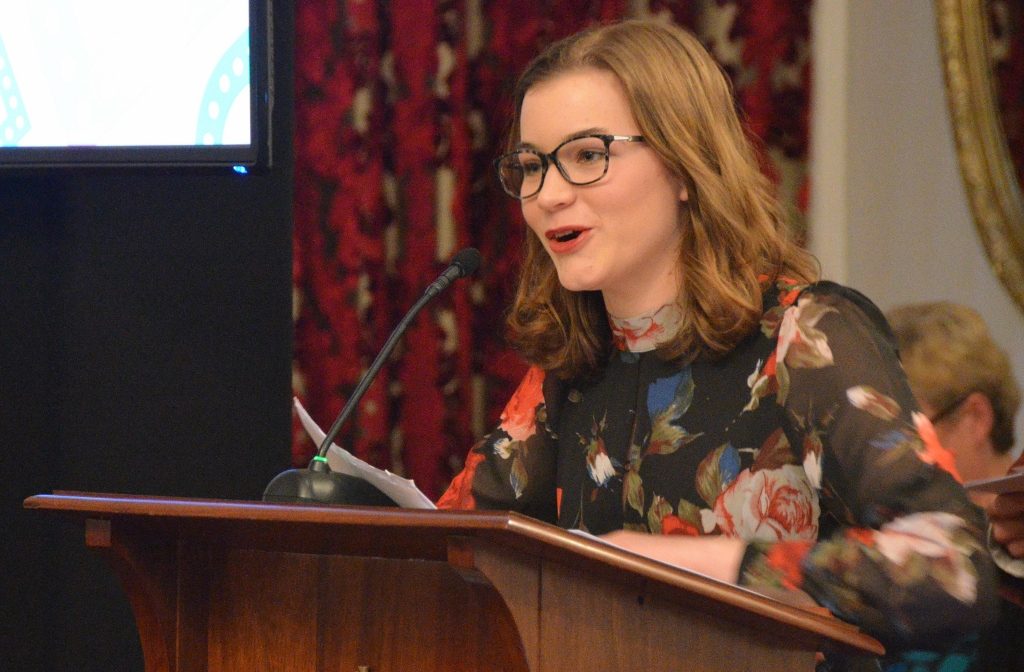
- Clara van Wel at the New Zealand Book Awards for Children and Young Adults 2015

Background information
- Born: 5 August 1997 (age 29); London, England
- Origin: Blenheim, New Zealand
- Genres: Pop rock, folk rock
- Instruments: Vocals, guitar
- Years active: 2011–present
- Label: Sony Music New Zealand
- Website: claravanwel.com

Clara van Wel (born 5 August 1997) is a New Zealand singer-songwriter, best known for winning series two of New Zealand's Got Talent in 2012.

== Background ==
Van Wel was born in England and moved to New Zealand aged seven. They started writing their own songs after receiving a guitar when they were 10 and regularly performed at the Marlborough Farmers' Market. Van Wel enjoyed success in local Marlborough talent shows. In 2010, aged 12, van Wel won Marlborough Got Talent with their self-penned song "Crocodile Tears", and in 2011, van Wel won Marlborough Stars in Your Eyes, where they performed as Rickie Lee Jones.

In both 2011 and 2012, van Wel won the Marlborough regional final of the Smokefreerockquest school music competition. In 2011, aged 13, they performed their original songs "Closer" and "Living a Life", and in 2012 they performed their songs "For A Moment" and "What Else Is There?" Despite their regional wins, van Wel was not selected for either the 2011 or 2012 national finals.

== New Zealand's Got Talent ==
In 2012, Van Wel won the second series of New Zealand's Got Talent, performing original songs, including their grand final song "Where Do You Find Love?" Van Wel first appeared in the fourth semi-final, screened on 4 November, where they played original composition "Between The Lines". They won the audience vote, earning them a place in the grand final. For the final on 25 November, they performed another original composition, "Where Do You Find Love?". In the results show, van Wel was first announced as one of the top three voted contestants, before being announced as the winner of the series. They won a $100,000 cash prize and a 2013 Toyota Corolla car.

== Music career ==
Following their New Zealand's Got Talent win, van Wel was signed to Sony Music New Zealand. A single of "Where Do You Find Love?" was released digitally on 7 December 2012, along with van Wel's two other original songs from New Zealand's Got Talent – "Between The Lines" and "Lines You Traced". The CD single was released on 12 December and debuted at number three in the New Zealand pop charts. The other two songs on the single – "Between the Lines" and "Lines You Traced" charted at 35 and 36 respectively.

In January 2013, van Wel began recording songs for their debut album, and in March they released second single "Beautiful". They were also added to the line-up of the Classic Hits Winery Tour, touring New Zealand in February and March along with Fat Freddy's Drop and The Adults. In September they released third single "Wait For Me" on iTunes, co-written with Don McGlashan, with whom they also worked on other new recordings. Their debut, self-titled album was released on 25 October 2013. It is co-produced by Don McGlashan and Joel Little.

In August 2014, van Wel featured with other New Zealand artists on the charity single "Song for Everyone".

== Education ==
In 2015, van Wel moved back to England to study English at Newnham College, Cambridge. They graduated in 2018.

== Discography ==
=== Albums ===
Year	Title	Details	Peak chart positions
Year	Title	Details	NZ
2013	Clara van Wel	Released: 25 October 2013; Label: Sony Music New Zealand	7
"—" denotes a recording that did not chart or was not released in that territory.

=== Singles ===
Year	Single	Peak chart positions		Album
Year	Single	NZ	NZ singles	Album
2012	"Where Do You Find Love?"	3	1	Clara van Wel
2013	"Beautiful"	—	6	Clara van Wel
2013	"Wait For Me"	—	20	Clara van Wel
"—" denotes releases that did not chart or were not released in that country.

=== Other charted songs ===
Year	Song	Peak chart positions		Album
Year	Song	NZ	NZ singles	Album
2012	"Between The Lines"	35	7	Non-album song
2012	"Lines You Traced"	36	8	Non-album song
