= Jason Reeves (radio broadcaster) =

Nerw Zealand broadcaster and television presenter

- Born: May 1976 (age 50); Hastings, New Zealand
- Presenting career
- Style: Disc Jockey
- Country: New Zealand
- Previous shows: The Morning Madhouse on The Edge; Reeves and Mull on ZM

Jason Reeves (born May 1976 in Hastings, New Zealand) is a radio broadcaster and television presenter from New Zealand. He currently co-hosts the breakfast show on The Coast (New Zealand). He has previously worked for other stations such as Auckland's Classic Hits 97.4, The Edge and for ZM.

== Career ==
Reeves began his radio career in 1994 at the age of 18 after leaving Karamū High School, and worked on Hot 93FM in Hawke's Bay. He remained there until 1996, when he moved to another Hawkes Bay Station, Xtreme 100. In 1997, he moved to Hamilton to work on the then-local station, The Edge, originally on the drive time show, but moved to the breakfast show with Jay-Jay Feeney in 1998. Reeves worked at The Edge as it progressed from a local Hamilton station to a nationwide network station based in Auckland, which happened in late 2001.

At the end of 2004, Reeves left The Edge, reportedly as a result of a prank carried out by his breakfast co-hosts Jay-Jay Feeney and Dominic Harvey. Jay Jay and Dom started sending Jason text messages from a prepaid cellphone pretending to be a fan who had somehow managed to obtain Jason's number. Over 100 texts were sent and management of The Edge were aware of the prank. Jason left, filing a personal grievance against The Edge operators, MediaWorks NZ.

In February 2005, only three months after leaving The Edge, Reeves was given a job with opposition station ZM, originally co-hosting Stables Rump 30 countdown with Stables (another former Edge presenter), on Saturday afternoons and later, his own Saturday morning breakfast show with co-host Andrew Mulligan. He also filled in for other ZM announcers, including Stables, while he took leave to judge NZ Idol, and the ZM Morning Crew, Polly and Grant. In February 2007, Reeves moved to Classic Hits and hosted the drive time show. He also briefly hosted a Sunday afternoon show.

In November 2010 a decision was made by The Radio Network to terminate the contracts of breakfast hosts Andrew Dickens and Jacque Tucker on Auckland's Classic Hits 97.4. Reeves then became the new host of the breakfast show on Auckland's Classic Hits along with Stacey Morrison and Justin Brown. The reason given was that Andrew & Jacque's show was aiming at the 'wrong demographic'. The new line-up with Jason, Stacey and Justin also more directly targeted rival station More FM Auckland's breakfast show with Stu Tolan, Amber Peebles and Marc Ellis.

In 2014 TRN decided to rebrand all the Classic Hits stations as The Hits, targeting a different demographic. As a result, Reeves opted to finish working for the station, and his last show there was on 24 April, ending seven years of working for Classic Hits.

Afterwards, he was occasionally heard on Mix 98.2, filling in for regular presenter Melanie Homer. He was later heard as a fill-in presenter on Magic in 2016. Starting in early 2017, he became the drive show host for Coast, eventually moving to breakfast host, where he remains currently.

== Television ==
Reeve's experience on radio led to a short television career in 2004 and 2005, co-hosting his own show on TV1 called Headliners, as well as voice-over work for other TV shows. At the end of 2005, his contract with TVNZ was terminated after Headliners was axed as part of a revamp of the TV1 News Service.

In 2007, Reeves made a return to television, starring in a commercial for the We Want You Motor Group, and in 2008, Jason teamed up once again with Andrew Mulligan (who Jason worked with on ZM), as co-host on New Zealand's Got Talent, which screened on Prime TV.

== See also ==
- List of New Zealand television personalities
