= JGeek and the Geeks =

JGeeks
- Origin: Auckland, New Zealand
- Genres: Electro pop, Pop, Te Reo
- Years active: 2010 – present
- Label: kog.co.nz
- Members: Jermaine Leef; Marino Taiatini; Eru Bennett-Paul
- Past members: Christian Fautret; Ricky Flavell; Parai Parai

JGeeks are a New Zealand performance Maori comedy music group best known for their songs "Maori Boy" and "The Best Day I Ever Had", as well as their 2012 appearance as finalists in New Zealand's Got Talent. The group is led by former Disney Channel and C4 television presenter and Cleo Bachelor of the Year finalist, Jermaine Leef.

== History ==
In 2011, TV3 received NZ On Air funding to develop a comedy series titled J Geek vs the World, however this series was not produced.

In 2012, the group entered New Zealand's Got Talent using the shortened name Jgeeks. They won the public vote in their semi-final, and eventually finished in fourth place in the grand final.

In September 2013, the group embarked on a 22-venue tour of New Zealand called the Eggs Factor tour. After playing their first eight shows, the tour was cancelled due to "circumstances outside of our control".

=== The Cuzzies ===
The Cuzzies is a Metro-Maori electro craze group formed in 2011 and consists of the current members of JGeeks. They are best known for their 2011 single, "Ghost Chips".

Ghost Chips is a music video that parodies the anti-drink driving ad "Legend" that played on New Zealand television. Ghost Chips entered the NZ singles charts at number 11 in November. It received over 100,000 views in 4 days on YouTube.

== Discography ==
=== Albums ===
Title	Album details	Peak chart positions		Sales	Certifications
Title	Album details	NZ	NZ Albums	Sales	Certifications
Maoris vs. Music	Released: 27 June 2014; Label: Kog Mastering; Formats: digital download	—	—		
"—" denotes a recording that did not chart or was not released in that territory.

=== Singles ===
Title	Year	Peak chart positions		Certifications	Album
Title	Year	NZ	NZ Singles	Certifications	Album
"Maori Boy"	2010	33	—		Non-album single
"I'm a Taniwha"	2011	—	7		Non-album single
"Ghost Chips"	2011	—	11		Non-album single
"The Best Day I Ever Had"	2013	13	2		Non-album single
"—" denotes a recording that did not chart or was not released in that territory.

=== Other singles ===
Title	Year	Album
"Show Me How To Geek"	2009	Non-album single
"Icky Sticky"	2010	Non-album single
"I Love Hangi"	2011	Non-album single
"Coz I Luv Ya"	2012	Non-album single
"Down Down" (featuring Savage)	2013	Non-album single
"We're Going on a Bear Hunt"	2013	Non-album single
"Maoris Be Like" (featuring Incredabull)	2013	Non-album single
"We Make the Beat Go"	2013	Non-album single
"The Blazdidis" (featuring James Rolleston)	2014	Non-album single
"Where You From"	2014	Non-album single
