= Maori Boy =

Single by JGeek and the Geeks
- Released: 1 December 2010
- Length: 2:42
- Songwriter(s): J Leef, S Bishop

JGeek and the Geeks singles chronology
"Maori Boy" (2010)	"Icky Sticky" (2011)

"Maori Boy" is a song by New Zealand retro Māori group JGeek and the Geeks.

== Chart performance ==
The song debuted on the RIANZ charts at number 38 where it stayed for 3 weeks. It then rose 5 spots to number 33

== Music video ==
The music video for "Maori Boy" was put on to YouTube 5 days prior to its official release on Select Live. It received 50,000 views in that time and Soulja Boy made a tweet about the video. The music video has 2,234,964 views as of March 11, 2022 and shows JGeek and The Geeks "geeking" in Auckland City.
