= Paul Ellis =

New Zealand record producer and radio host

Paul Ellis MNZM
- Born: Brian Paul Ellis; 1962 or 1963 (age 63–64); Timaru, New Zealand
- Occupations: Record producer; manager; radio host

Brian Paul Ellis MNZM (born 1962 or 1963) is a New Zealand record producer, manager, and radio host. He is most known to audiences for being the former judge of New Zealand Idol and a former judge of the reality series New Zealand's Got Talent.

Ellis was appointed a Member of the New Zealand Order of Merit in the 2011 Queen's Birthday Honours, for services to the music industry.

In 2016, he was presented with the Fullers Entertainment Award from the Variety Artists Club of New Zealand for his services to the entertainment industry.

Ellis sits on the boards of The Starship Foundation and Digital Media Trust.
