= Maala (musician) =

MAALA
- Born: Evan William Sinton; Auckland, New Zealand
- Origin: Auckland, New Zealand
- Genres: Pop, electropop
- Occupation: Singer-songwriter
- Instruments: Keyboard, guitar
- Years active: 2012–present
- Label: Sony Music New Zealand
- Website: www.maala.co

Evan William Sinton, better known by his stage name Maala (also stylised as MAALA), is a New Zealand singer-songwriter. He is best known for his songs "Touch" and "Kind of Love", and for coming third on the second series of New Zealand's Got Talent in 2012. In 2016, he won Best Male Solo Artist at the New Zealand Music Awards.

== New Zealand's Got Talent ==
In 2012, under his birth name, Evan Sinton auditioned for series two of New Zealand's Got Talent with The Beatles' "Blackbird". Sinton qualified for the semi-final, with judge Jason Kerrison praising his voice, saying "it's distinctive, it's unique".

In the semi-final, Sinton performed Screamin' Jay Hawkins's song "I Put a Spell on You". Sinton placed in the top three in the semi-final, and made it to the final on the judges' vote. In the final, Sinton performed the Cher song "Bang Bang (My Baby Shot Me Down)". He finished third from the public vote.

== Solo career ==
In 2013, following his appearance on New Zealand's Got Talent, Sinton was signed to Sony Music New Zealand. He supported The X Factor Australia winner Reece Mastin on his 2013 New Zealand tour. Sinton went on to release the EP Phosphenes, from which came the singles "Tables and Chairs" and "Prisoner's Cinema".

== MAALA ==
In 2015, Sinton adopted the stage name MAALA. He used the name to separate himself from his New Zealand's Got Talent identity and to reflect the new direction of his music. He chose the name MAALA because it "looked cool on paper".

MAALA initially released the singles "Touch" and "In the Air", followed by a self-titled EP. In July 2015, "Touch" was long-listed for the 2015 Silver Scroll award, credited to Sinton and the song's co-writers Jaden Parkes and Josh Fountain.

In 2016, the single "Kind of Love" was released, followed by MAALA's debut album, Composure. Later in 2016, MAALA was nominated for four New Zealand Music Awards, and won Best Male Solo Artist.

== Discography ==
=== Albums ===
Title	Details	Peak chart positions
Title	Details	NZ
As Evan Sinton
Phosphenes	Released: 14 June 2013; Label: Sony Music NZ; Type: Extended play; Format: digital download	—
As MAALA
MAALA	Released: 28 August 2015; Label: MAALA Music; Type: Extended play; Format: digital download	20
Composure	Released: 29 July 2016; Label: Sony Music NZ; Type: Studio album; Format: CD, digital download	12
"—" denotes a recording that did not chart or was not released in that territory.

=== Singles ===
Title	Year	Peak chart positions		Album
Title	Year	NZ Heat.	NZ Regional	Album
As Evan Sinton
"Tables and Chairs"	2013	—	—	Phosphenes EP
"Prisoner's Cinema"	2013	—	—	Phosphenes EP
As MAALA
"Touch"	2015	—	7	MAALA EP
"In the Air"	2015	—	11	MAALA EP
"Kind of Love"	2016	10	2	Composure
"Stranger"	2016	—	—	Composure
"In My Head"	2017	6	8	TBA
"Crazy"	2017	5	9	TBA
"Fire Burning"	2019	— (Note: "Fire Burning" did not enter the NZ Top 40 Singles Chart, but peaked at number 29 on the NZ Hot Singles Chart.)	—	TBA
"—" denotes a recording that did not chart or was not released in that territory.

== Awards and nominations ==
Year	Nominee / work	Award	Result	Ref.
2015	Evan Sinton/Jaden Parkes/Josh Fountain – "Touch"	APRA Silver Scroll	Shortlisted	
2016	MAALA	MTV Europe Music Awards – Best New Zealand Act	Nominated	
2016	"Kind of Love"	New Zealand Music Awards – Single of the Year	Nominated	
2016	MAALA (Composure)	New Zealand Music Awards – Best Male Solo Artist	Won	
2016	Composure	New Zealand Music Awards – Best Pop Album	Nominated	
2016	MAALA	New Zealand Music Awards – People's Choice Award	Nominated	
