= City Impact Church New Zealand =

Pentecostal church based in New Zealand

Coordinates: 36.7224°S 174.7223°E

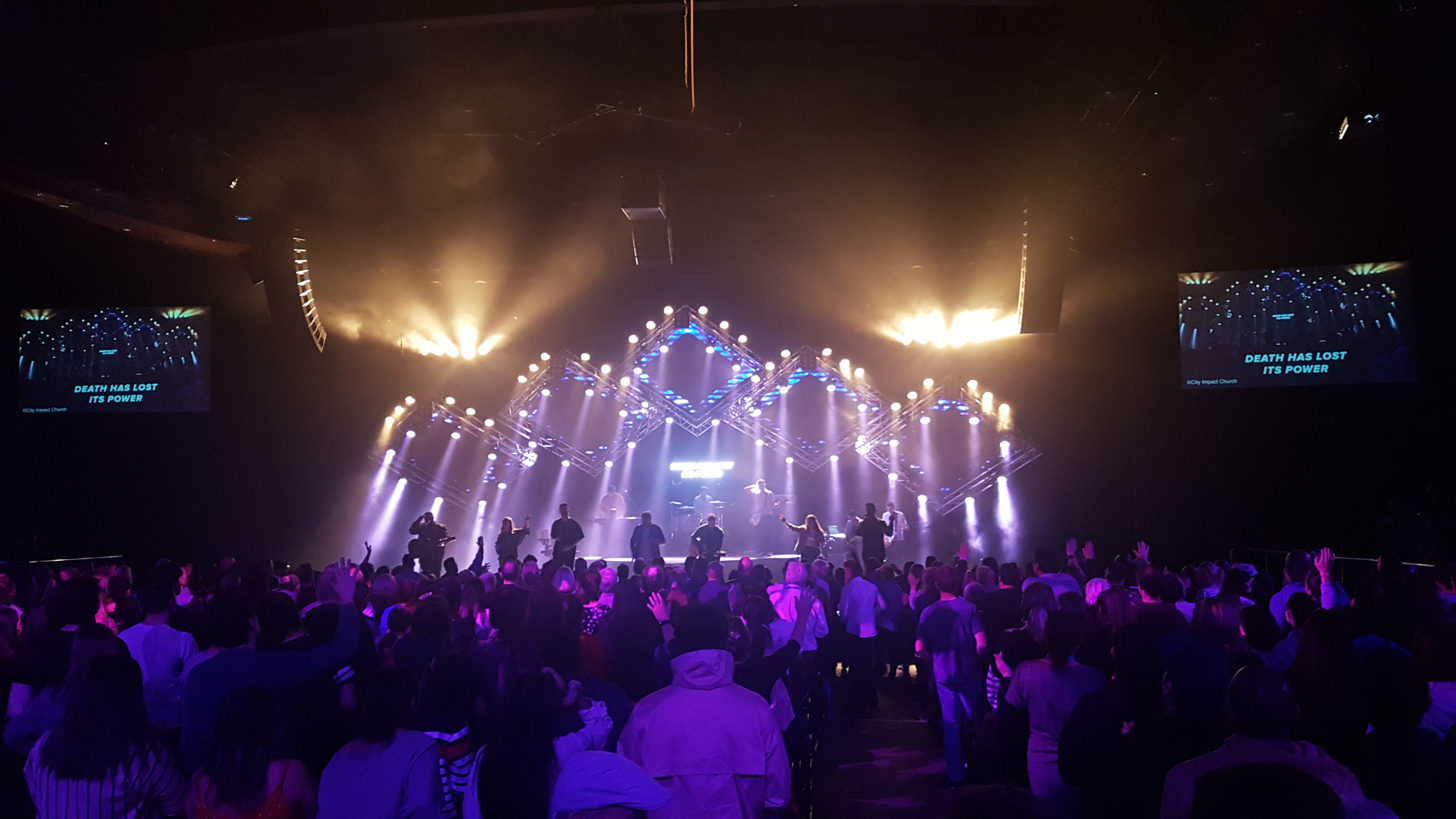
Worship service in City Impact Church Auckland North Shore.

City Impact Church (CIC) is a pentecostal church based in Auckland, New Zealand. It operates a network of satellite churches across New Zealand, and in Canada, India, Mexico, the Philippines, and Tonga. It operates several community outreach programmes in New Zealand, including a school, a "Community Impact" support programme, and three childcare centres.

== History ==
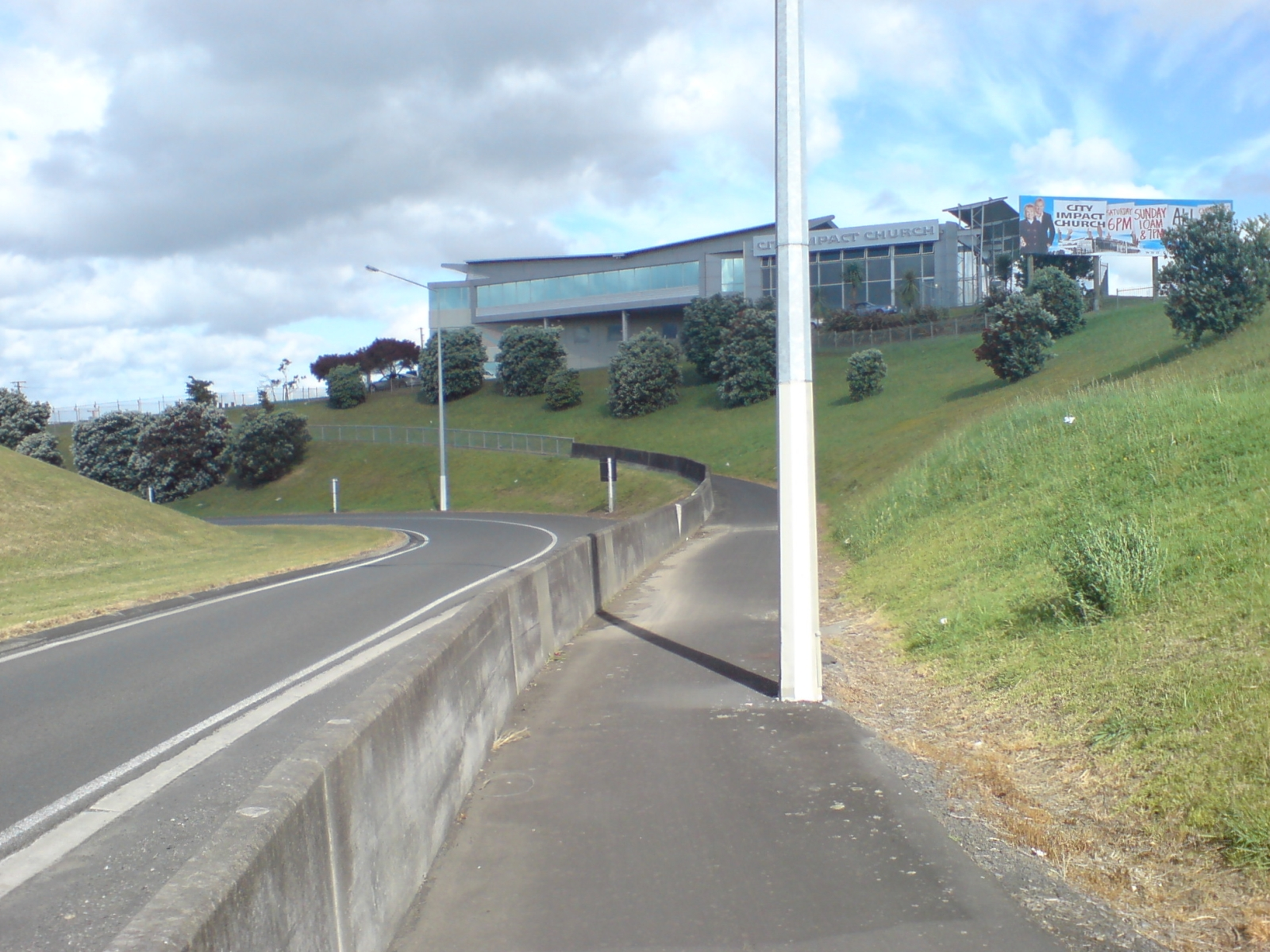
City Impact Church – Mt Wellington

Formerly known as Bays Christian Fellowship, it was founded in 1982 by current senior pastors Peter Mortlock and his wife Bev Mortlock.

The church ran the television programme Impact For Life on TV channel Prime, as well as on Shine TV. The programme has been screened regularly on the Australian Christian Channel, United Christian Broadcast in UK, Power Vision in India, Cook Islands TV in Rarotonga, World Harvest Broadcasting network in Fiji and Daavo Christian Bible Channel in the Philippines.

City Impact Church operates a network of churches in Auckland (North Shore, Mount Wellington, Westgate, Botany), Tauranga, Queenstown, Invercargill, and Balclutha, and has satellite churches in Canada, India, Mexico, the Philippines, Fiji and Tonga.

In 2011, City Impact Church earned a revenue of $10,000,000 – roughly $6.9 million of that coming from donations.

== Community outreach programmes ==
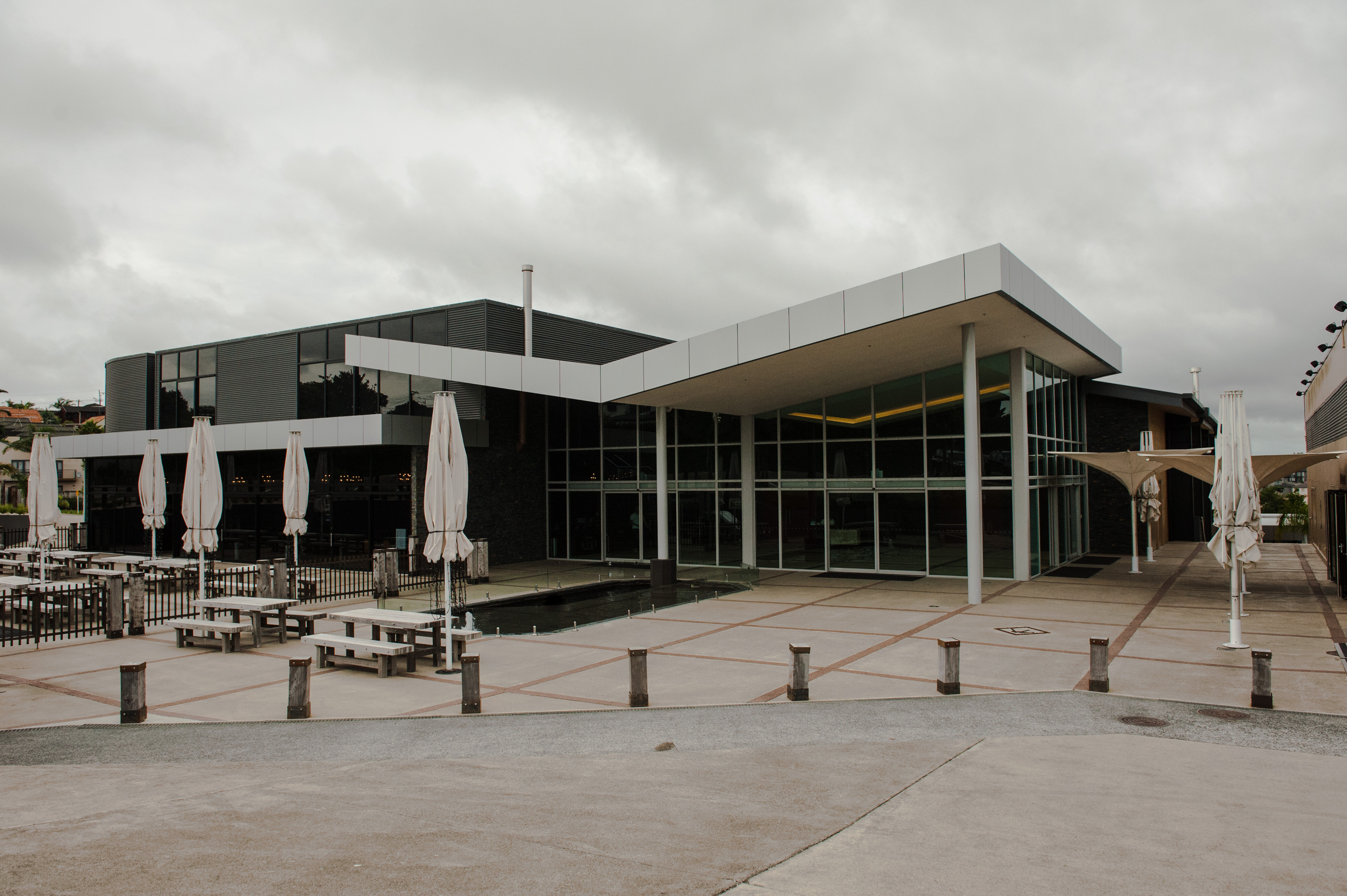
City Impact Church North Shore Campus

City Impact Church runs several community outreach programmes including a school, a "Community Impact" support programme, and three childcare centers in Auckland and Queenstown.

=== City Impact Church School ===
CIC founded City Impact Church School in 2004, where subjects include History, Geography and Doctrine, Language, Mathematics, Science, Art, Music, Drama, PE, and Kingdom Building, and teaches Years 0 through to 13 (Primary, Intermediate and Secondary school). It was temporarily closed in 2005 by the Ministry of Education because it was not a registered educational institution, but soon reopened once registration was complete. In 2015 a new classroom block was opened to accommodate growth.

=== Community impact ===
The church runs a community support program called Community Impact, which involves over 700 church volunteers going to schools, hospitals and private homes to help clean, garden and maintain properties, as they seek to put biblical principles into practice. The church holds three or four Community Impact days a year, with volunteers reaching 150–200 homes across New Zealand. City Impact delivers over 1000 Christmas boxes every Christmas to underprivileged individuals and families as part of their Christmas community impact day. To help identify and support families City Impact works with numerous community organisations.

=== City Impact Childcare ===
The church has three childcare centres, two in Auckland and one in Queenstown. 80% of their teachers are qualified and they are open to both church members and not-church members. In 2014 one of their head teachers, Francesca Bunting, was awarded the NZ's Most Inspiring Teachers award in the Early Childhood category.

== Activism and controversies ==
=== Opposition to same-sex marriage ===
==== Enough Is Enough rally ====
City Impact Church has historically worked alongside Brian Tamaki's Destiny Church. In 2004 they jointly organised the first of the Enough Is Enough rallies protesting against the legalisation of civil unions in New Zealand and promoting "traditional family values." A subsequent editorial in The New Zealand Herald pointed out that "for all the fear and loathing [the march] aroused in liberal discussion" the church had done nothing to suggest "that its intentions are other than law-abiding and democratic."

==== Poll controversy ====
In January 2013, The New Zealand Herald reported that pastor Peter Mortlock had attempted to manipulate a same-sex marriage poll. The poll was set up on the website of Member of Parliament Murray McCully, the Minister of Foreign Affairs, in reference to Louisa Wall's Marriage (Definition of Marriage) Amendment Act 2013, and asked "Do you support or oppose the proposed legislation that would make it possible for same sex couples to marry?" Mortlock emailed his congregation stating "Since we are able to vote as many times as we like, I'd encourage you to place your votes and keep checking back." The multiple votes were spotted by the McCully staff and were removed.

=== COVID-19 pandemic ===
During the COVID-19 pandemic in New Zealand, City Impact Church claimed a total of NZ$1.08 million from the Government's wage subsidy programme, including NZ$869,944.80 for 131 employees in Auckland, NZ$75,866.40 for 12 staff in Balclutha and NZ$133,562.4 for 19 employees in Queenstown.

In early October 2021, the church's leader Peter Mortlock encouraged members to attend an anti-lockdown protest in Auckland organised by Destiny Church leader Tamaki, claiming that "freedoms were being stripped away." Following Tamaki's remand in prison for violating bail conditions, Mortlock issued a statement objecting to his imprisonment, describing it as a "sad day for New Zealand." In addition, five North Island pastors penned a letter deploring Tamaki's imprisonment and calling for his release. Tamaki was subsequently released on 26 January after High Court judge Paul Davison ruled against the decision to remand him in prison. However, Tamaki was subject to new bail conditions prohibiting him from organising or participating in future anti-lockdown protests and a 24 hour curfew.

== See also ==
- Religion in New Zealand
- Christianity in New Zealand
- Christian politics in New Zealand
- Christian fundamentalism
