= Rachel Hunter =

New Zealand model and actress (born 1969)

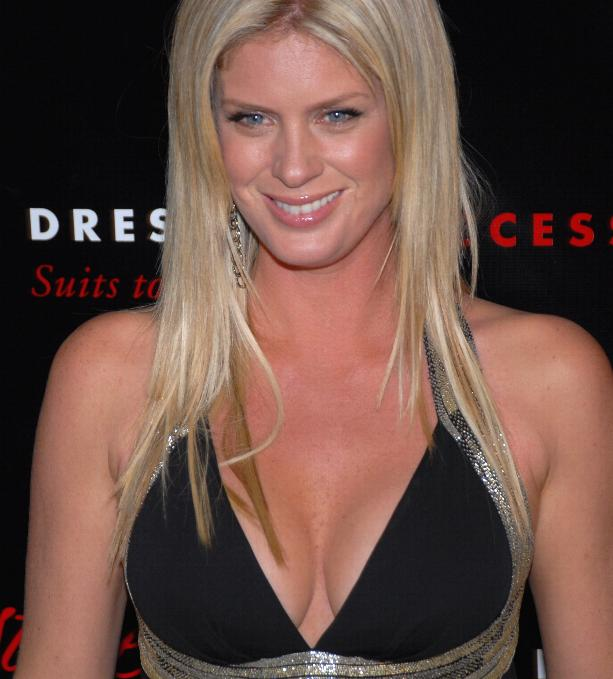
- Hunter in 2008
- Born: 8 September 1969 (age 57); Glenfield, Auckland, New Zealand
- Occupations: Model; actress
- Years active: 1986–Present
- Spouse: Rod Stewart (m. 1990; div. 2006)
- Children: 2
- Modeling information
- Height: 5 ft 11 in (180 cm)
- Hair color: Blonde
- Eye color: Blue
- Website: rachelhunter.com

Rachel Hunter (born 8 September 1969) is a New Zealand model, actress, and the host of Imagination Television's Rachel Hunter's Tour of Beauty. She has appeared on several magazine covers, including Vogue, Elle, Rolling Stone, Sports Illustrated, Playboy, Cosmopolitan, and Harper's Bazaar. She has been on the cover of the Sports Illustrated Swimsuit Issue twice: in 1994 (alongside Kathy Ireland and Elle Macpherson) and in 2006 (alongside six other models).

== Early life ==
Hunter was born on 9 September 1969 in Glenfield, a suburb of Auckland, New Zealand, and educated at Glenfield College. Her parents divorced when she was still a child. As a child she wanted to be a ballet dancer, but at 13 became ill with toxoplasmosis, which curtailed her dancing ambitions.

== Career ==
External images
- Hunter's Sports Illustrated Swimsuit Issue cover from February 1994
- Hunter's Sports Illustrated Swimsuit Issue cover from February 2006

=== Modeling ===
Hunter began her career at age 16, modelling in France, Australia and New Zealand, appearing in Australian Vogue, Harper's Bazaar, Australian Cosmopolitan and for various campaigns throughout New Zealand and Australia. She became the face of Tip Top Ice-Cream in New Zealand and was the "Trumpet Girl". She was quickly signed up to Ford Models and immediately embarked on a successful career, landing a Cover Girl cosmetics contract and becoming the spokesperson for the company for several years. Hunter rose to global prominence after posing as a Sports Illustrated swimsuit model in 1989. She subsequently appeared on magazine covers, including Cosmopolitan and on the 1994 "Dream Team" cover of Sports Illustrated's annual swimsuit issue with other supermodels Elle MacPherson and Kathy Ireland, and again graced its cover, this time solo, 12 years later in 2006. Hunter also appeared on the cover of Vogue Italia, Australian Vogue, American and international editions of Elle and Dutch Harper's Bazaar.

Hunter posed nude for a cover-featured Playboy pictorial published in April 2004.

Hunter is signed to Ford Models in New York, Select Model Management in London, and Chadwick Models in Sydney.

=== Acting ===
Hunter first appeared on television in 1985 in an advertisement for the New Zealand ice cream brand Tip Top, promoting their "Trumpet" ice-cream.

Hunter guest starred in a 1997 episode of The Drew Carey Show as herself. She has appeared in several independent films, including 1999's A Walk in the Park and 2000's Two Shades of Blue, an erotic thriller with Marlee Matlin. She stars as a lesbian cook doling out relationship advice in the award-winning indie film La Cucina. She had a brief appearance as a sexy mother in Dennis Dugan's The Benchwarmers (2006) and also played a sultry, bikini-clad mother in the music video for Fountains of Wayne's 2003 song "Stacy's Mom".

Hunter was one of six celebrities in the inaugural cast of the American dance competition series Dancing with the Stars in 2005. She appeared on a 2005 celebrity episode of Lingo, where she and her partner Trista Rehn split $30,000 for charity. Hunter is an ambassador to The Born Free Foundation, and established the Rachel Hunter Lowland Gorilla Fund. Hunter also appeared as herself in the 2004 Christmas Special of The Vicar of Dibley. She also starred in Confessions of a Go-Go Girl (2008), The Perfect Assistant (2008), the science fiction TV movies Piranhaconda (2011) and Swamp Volcano, aka Miami Magma (2012).

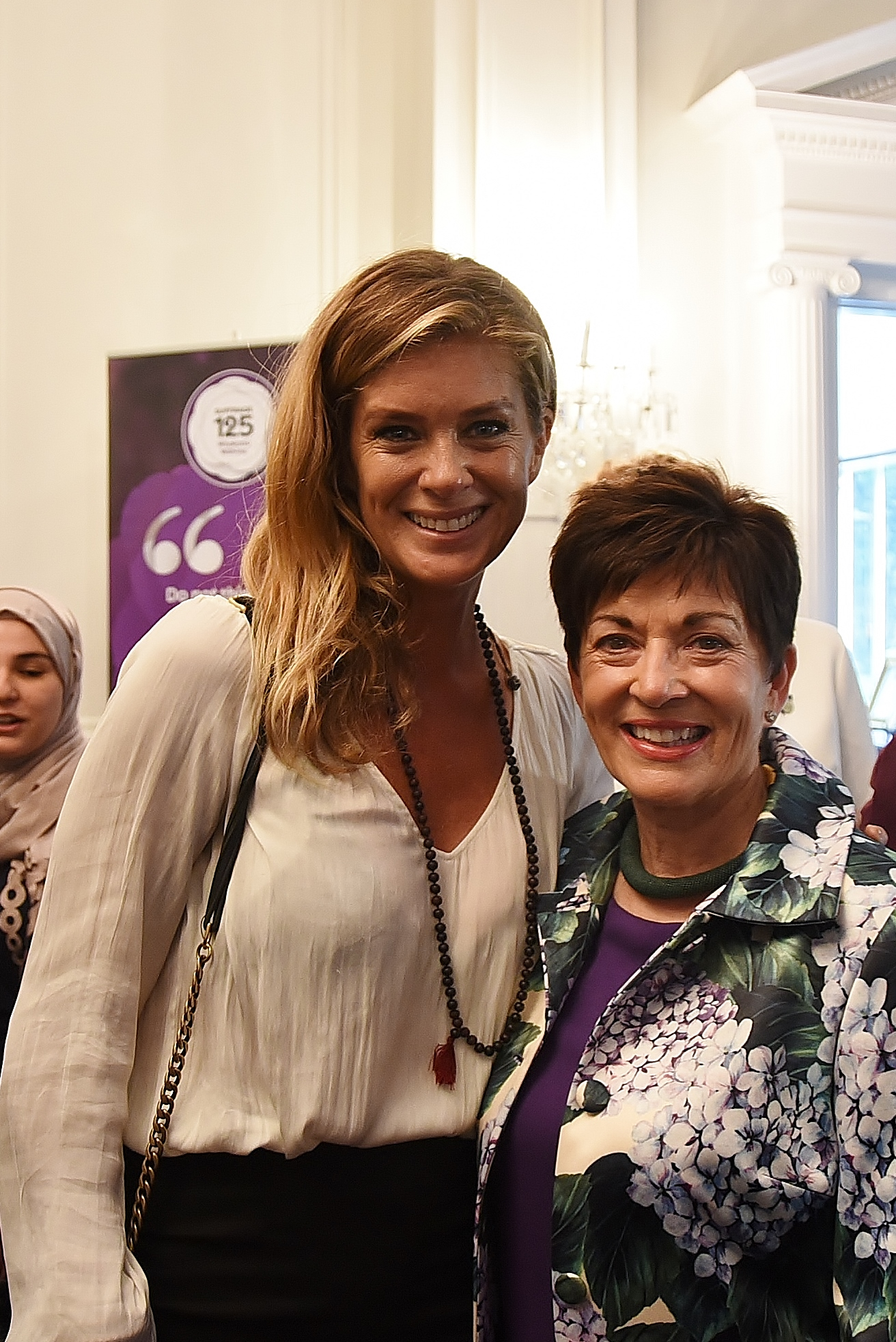
Hunter (left), alongside the governor-general, Dame Patsy Reddy, at the Suffrage 125 launch at Government House, Wellington, on 7 March 2018

She appeared as a judge on New Zealand's Got Talent from 2012 to 2013. In 2015, Hunter fronted her own television series titled Rachel Hunter's Tour of Beauty for TV One where she travelled the world to discover what beauty meant in various countries.

== Personal life ==
In the late 1980s, Hunter was in a relationship with rock musician Kip Winger.

At the age of 21, Hunter met rock star Rod Stewart, 24 years her senior, in a Los Angeles nightclub. They married three months later at the Beverly Hills Presbyterian Church in Beverly Hills, California, on 15 December 1990. Together they have two children. Stewart and Hunter separated in January 1999 after eight years of marriage, and their divorce was finalised on 2 November 2006.

She had a year-long relationship with Canadian NHL ice hockey player Sean Avery in 2004, and in 2006 began a three-year relationship with Jarret Stoll, 13 years her junior, also a Canadian NHL player who played for, and won the Stanley Cup with, the Los Angeles Kings. Stoll proposed to Hunter in 2008 whilst he accompanied her on a trip home to her native New Zealand later that year and they were due to marry on 14 August 2009, but the wedding was called off by Stoll seven weeks prior to their wedding day.

== Filmography ==
=== Film ===
Year	Title	Role	Notes
1998	Just a Little Harmless Sex	Marilyn	
1999	Two Shades of Blue	Susan Price	
1999	Winding Roads	Kelly Simons	
1999	A Walk in the Park	Sally's Sister	
2000	Tripfall	Gina Williams	
2001	MacArthur Park	Karen	
2001	Pendulum	Amanda Reeve	
2001	Boys Klub	The Goddess	
2001	Rock Star	A.C.'s Wife	
2002	Redemption of the Ghost	Gloria	
2003	Haunted Lighthouse	Widow Feeney	Short film
2004	El Padrino	Newscaster	
2005	You and Your Stupid Mate	Karen	
2005	Freezerburn	Holly Hardin	
2006	Final Move	Iris Quarrie	
2006	I.R.A.: King of Nothing	British Intelligence Agent	
2006	The Benchwarmers	Hot Mother	
2006	Ozzie	Beth Morton	
2007	Dead Write	Jade	Also associate producer
2007	Mexican American	Jacqueline	
2007	7-10 Split	Chiropracter	
2007	La Cucina	Jude	
2009	Jordon Saffron: Taste This!	Nikki	
2010	The Brazen Bull	Detective Vinyec	
2010	Black Widow	Dr. Laura	
2011	A Matter of Justice	Nicole Ibiza	
2013	Madoff: Made Off with America	Mimi Mymen	
2014	Soul Mates	Carly	

=== Television ===
Year	Title	Role	Notes
1991	Ford Super Model of the World	Host	Television special
1993	Bobby's World	Ms. Miller	Episode: "Bobby Ties the Knot" (voice)
1994	Shortland Street	Herself	Episode: "1.458" (uncredited)
1995	Mad About You	Herself	Episode: "Just My Dog"
1996	Very Important Pennis	Herself	Episode: "Very Important Pennis: Part Two"
1997	The Drew Carey Show	Herself	Episode: "Cap-Beer-Cino"
1999	Suddenly Susan	Meegan Garrity	Episode: "Sometimes You Feel Like a Nut"
2000	Best Actress	Fiona Covington	Television film
2003	Are You Hot?	Co-Host	6 episodes
2004	The Real Gilligan's Island	Ginger Rachel	5 episodes
2004	The Vicar of Dibley	Herself	Episode: "Merry Christmas"
2005	Larva	Hayley Anderson	Television film
2005	Dancing with the Stars	Herself	5 episodes
2005	Living with Fran	Herself	Episode: "Going to a Bar Mitzvah with Fran"
2006	Mad TV	Herself	2 episodes
2006	Style Me	Judge	8 episodes
2006	Make Me a Supermodel	Herself	6 episodes
2006	Celebrity Paranormal Project	Herself	Episode: "Pearl"
2008	The Perfect Assistant	Judith Manion	Television film
2008	Confessions of a Go-Go Girl	Donna Mercer	Television film
2010	Gravity	Shawna Rollins	Main cast; 10 episodes
2010	10 Things I Hate About You	Herself	Episode: "Too Much Information"
2011	Miami Magma	Antoinette Vitrini	Television film
2012	Piranhaconda	Talia	Television film
2012	New Zealand's Got Talent	Judge	13 episodes
2012	RuPaul's Drag Race All Stars	Guest Judge	Episode: "It Takes Two"
2015	Her Infidelity	Lily Helms	Television film
2017	The Women Behind The Women: Behind Steel Dragon	Wife	Television film
2023	RuPaul's Drag Race Down Under	Guest Judge	Episode: "BMX Bitches"
2026	I'm a Celebrity...Get Me Out of Here!	Herself	9 episodes

=== Music videos ===
Year	Title	Role	Notes
1991	"Broken Arrow" by Rod Stewart	Woman	Directed by Peter Nydrie
2003	"Stacy's Mom" by Fountains of Wayne	Stacy's Mom	Directed by Chris Applebaum
2006	"Mojo" by Peeping Tom	Woman	Created by Matt McDermitt

== Dancing with the Stars ==
Week #	Dance / Song	Judge's scores			Result
Week #	Dance / Song	Inaba	Goodman	Tonioli	Result
1	Waltz / "Three Times a Lady"	7	6	7	No elimination
2	Rumba / "I Don't Wanna Miss a Thing"	8	8	8	Bottom two
3	Tango / "Toxic"	8	9	9	Safe
4	Samba / "Tequila"	7	9	9	Eliminated
4	Group Viennese Waltz / "I Got You Babe"	No scores given			Eliminated
