= Jason Kerrison =

New Zealand singer-songwriter (born 1976)

Jason Mark Kerrison MNZM
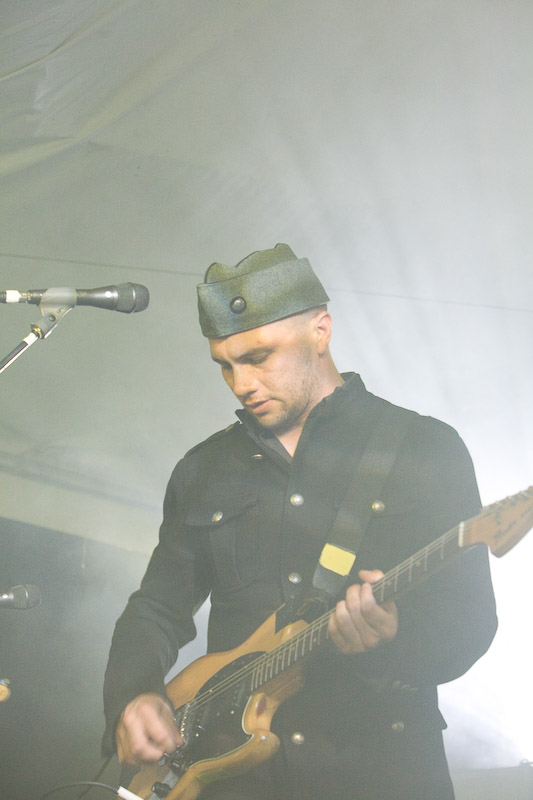
- Kerrison performing at TechFest in 2008

Background information
- Born: October 15, 1976 (age 50); Invercargill, New Zealand
- Genres: Rock, pop
- Occupations: Singer-songwriter, producer
- Instruments: Vocals, electric guitar
- Member of: Opshop, The Babysitters Circus

Jason Mark Kerrison MNZM (born October 15, 1976) is a New Zealand singer-songwriter, producer, and former radio broadcaster, best known as the lead singer of the band Opshop.

Kerrison's albums with Opshop have gone multi-platinum and received critical acclaim. He received the 2008 APRA Silver Scroll Award for the hit single "One Day". In 2011, Kerrison was made a member of the New Zealand Order of Merit for services to music in the Queen's Birthday Honours List. In 2015, he received the Southland Music Ambassador award at the ILT Southland Entertainment Awards.

In addition to Opshop, Kerrison has worked on side projects including The Babysitters Circus, and has embarked on a solo career, collaborating with other artists and actively performing in concerts and charity events. Formerly a broadcaster for Mai FM and involved in the setup of Kiwi FM, Kerrison has also appeared on television as the host of XVenture Family Challenge alongside Kate Freebairn, and as a judge on New Zealand's Got Talent, among other media appearances. In 2021, he was the winner of series 1 of The Masked Singer NZ, appearing as tuatara.

Kerrison's fringe beliefs and doomsday prepping have earned him notoriety in the media, with some journalists branding him a conspiracy theorist. In particular, Kerrison's views on government and media reactions to COVID-19 mandates, his belief in the 2012 phenomenon, and his project to construct of an off-grid bunker home, have been the subject of interviews and commentary. In 2022, Kerrison said that his public views had created a strain in his relationships with other members of Opshop, and that it would be difficult for the band to reunite.

== Early life ==
Kerrison was born in Invercargill to parents Judith Moir, a nurse from a farming family, and Francis "Frank" Kerrison, who was a freezing worker and jazz musician. His father is of Ngāpuhi heritage, while his mother has a mixed European ancestry from Ireland, Germany and Scandinavia.

Kerrison's family moved to Christchurch when he was an older child. He attended St Theresa's school and St Bede's College, then later moved to Hillmorton High School. After leaving school, Kerrison went on to study broadcasting at Christchurch Polytech, which later became the New Zealand Broadcasting School at the Ara Institute of Canterbury. He went on to study Bachelor of Arts at Auckland University in Ethnomusicology.

Kerrison played the violin and bass at school. He was also exposed to the piano and drums from his grandmother and father, respectively. His father was a musician in his own right, popular in Invercargill for his dance hall band Three Plus One. Despite this influence, Kerrison doesn't claim to be a multi-instrumentalist and instead sees himself as a singer-songwriter, once claiming he is "not good at anything with an instrument."

At Hillmorton, he played in multiple school funk bands and participated in Rockquest, where he made friends with other musicians. His circles eventually came together to create the band Gorilla Biscuit, which took up residency at Dux De Lux, playing regular gigs.

== Career ==
Kerrison started his career in radio broadcasting, getting his first media role at Mai FM. He was later involved in the set up of Kiwi FM. During this time, Kerrison played music in bars, mainly in a cover band. Kerrison held various roles and internships during his broadcasting career, including at TVNZ, and MoreFM.

In addition to his artistic and broadcasting work, Kerrison is behind Control Freak Music, an independent label founded in 2008, and Noise Control Entertainment, a music publisher and live performance production company which was founded in 2010.

=== 2002–2014, 2018: Opshop and The Babysitters Circus ===
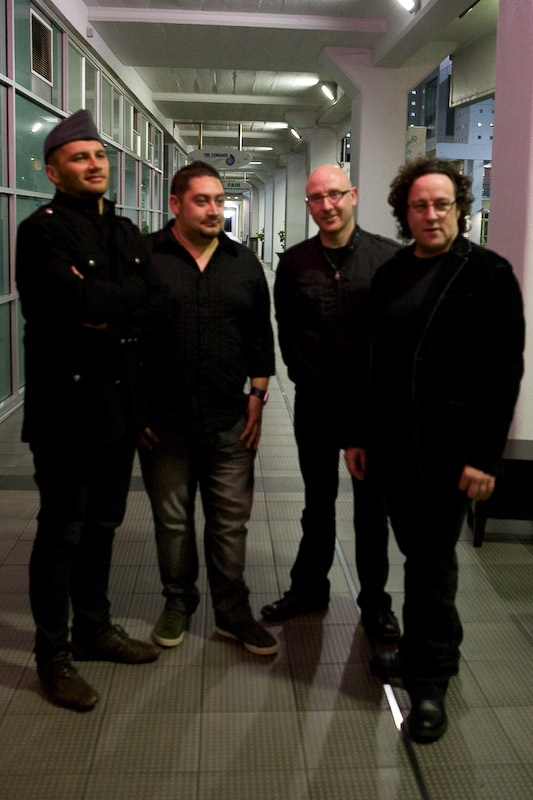
Kerrison (left) with members of Opshop in 2008

While playing in Auckland backpacker bars, Kerrison formed Opshop. Their debut single, Saturated, was submitted to a contest on the ZM radio station, kicking-starting the bands career. Opshop went on to release You Are Here in 2004, with label Siren Records, which went platinum. For their later albums, the group worked with producer Greg Haver. Their follow-up release, Second Hand Planet, went 3× platinum and spawned the hit single "One Day". The band released their third album, Until the End of Time, under the label Rhythmethod. It debuted at number 1.

In an interview, Kerrison said he had hoped Until the End of Time would not be the last Opshop album. However, the band later went on hiatus, a decision which was allegedly not unanimous. Kerrison expressed a desire to move into production and didn't want to be indefinitely defined by Opshop. The band played a performance at Homegrown festival in 2014 before parting ways. In the years leading up to this, Kerrison was also involved in The Babysitters Circus, a side project with four other artists, which found some success in 2011 with the popular single "Everything's Gonna Be Alright".

In 2018, Opshop reunited for a performance at Homegrown festival in Wellington; the band's guitarist, Matt Treacy, claimed they had not been in the same room since putting the band on hold.

In a 2022 interview, Kerrison said his public opinions on COVID-19 mandates would need to be "addressed" if Opshop was to reform, and suggested it would be difficult for the band to reunite. He chose not to provide details, but stated he felt "betrayed".

=== 2014–present: Solo career ===
Following the hiatus of Opshop, Kerrison pursued solo projects and sought to establish an independent production and licensing strategy, leaning into the business side of the music industry. In 2015, he released his first solo project, #JKEP1, an EP which was made available on Bandcamp. He continued playing a gigs, including with the Auckland Symphony Orchestra. Kerrison followed up with #JKEP2 in 2016.

Kerrison has released singles in collaboration with other artists, including with Jackie Bristow on the single "Warrior Spirit" in 2016, and the 2017 song "Humming Along" featuring Annie Crummer and Betty-Anne Monga, written to celebrate Emirates Team New Zealand’s victory in the America’s Cup whilst Kerrison was a Toyota NZ ambassador. In 2024, Kerrison collaborated with Jesse Wilde in an anti-mandate protest single "We Had A Choice?".

Since 2016, Kerrison has released several of his own singles as a solo artist including "A Wonderful Way", "I Will if You Will", "The Timing", and "Someone Should Love You ft. Leigh Franklin".

=== Other media appearances ===
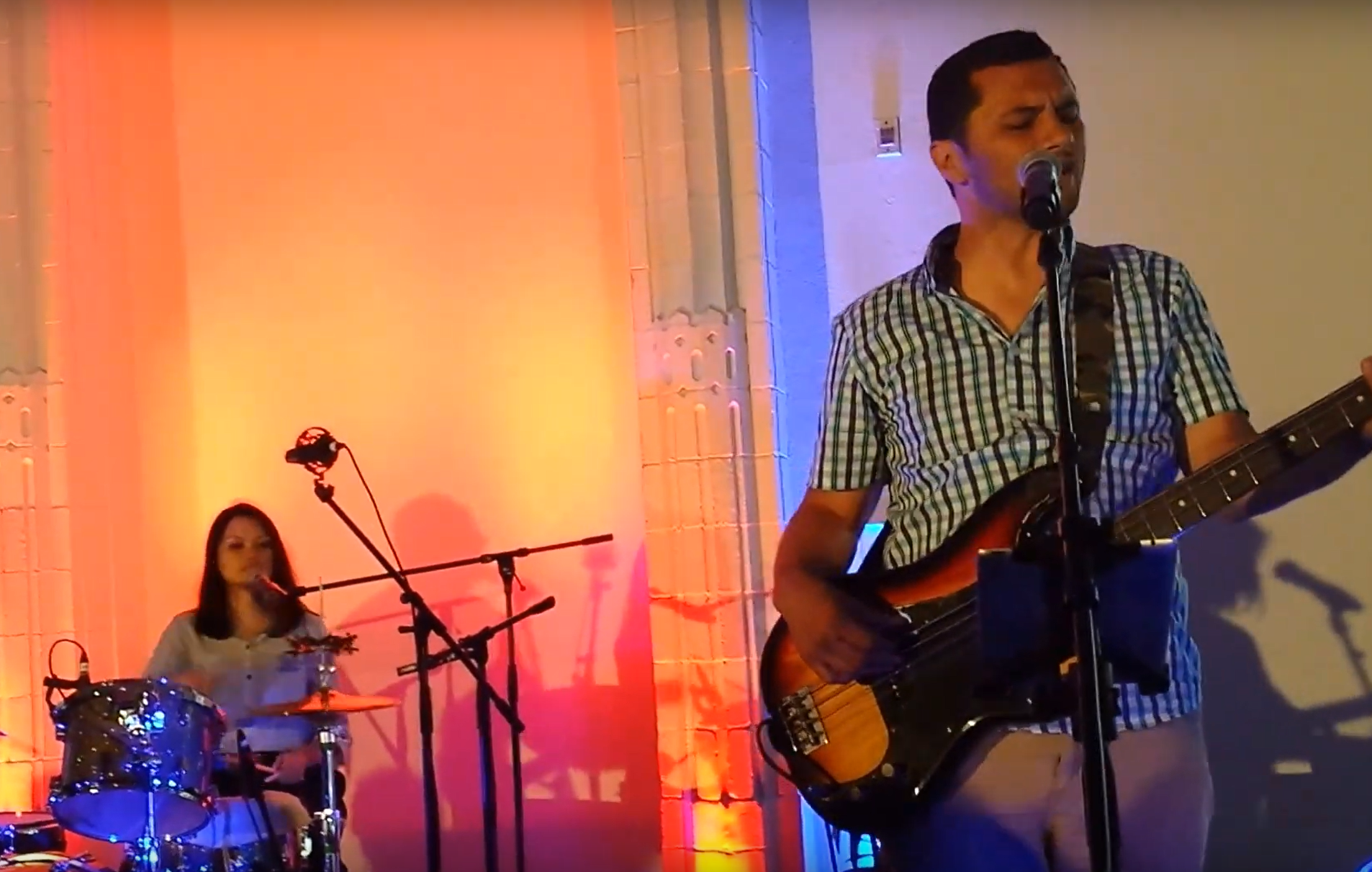
Kerrison performing with Bic Runga in 2016

In 2015, Kerrison presented at TEDxChristchurch on the use of the Golden Ratio in music composition. In 2019, he was the co-host of XVenture Family Challenge with Kate Freebairn.

Kerrison appeared as a judge on series 2 of New Zealand's Got Talent, alongside Rachel Hunter and Ali Campbell. He reprised the role the following year in series 3 of the show. In 2015, he was a guest judge on series 2 of The X Factor New Zealand. In 2011, Kerrison appeared in his capacity as a talent judge in episode 11, series 1, of Jono and Ben.

In 2021, Kerrison appeared as a contestant in series 1 of The Masked Singer NZ as the tuatara, and was crowned the winner of the series.

== Personal life ==
Kerrison lives with his partner, Adele Krantz, in an off-grid "bunker" home on a rural property in Kaitaia named "The Great Northern Retreat." He has three siblings, Tash, Melanie, and Brogan. Their father, Frank, died in 2024 in Christchurch.

In 2017, his mother, Judith, remarried to Kenyan national Gitonga 'Mich' Obadiah. After Obadiah's visa was declined, it was revealed that Kerrison had privately appealed to Kris Faafoi for help, with Faafoi promising (but ultimately failing) to intervene in the immigration case. The incident sparked accusations of inappropriate conduct and racism against Faafoi and government immigration services, respectively.

=== Religious and spiritual views ===
Kerrison's mother is Catholic and he attended church as a child, inspired by the singing in church. However, Kerrison does not identify with a religion and described himself as "close to being an atheist" in a 2015 interview, criticizing religious indoctrination and dogma. Instead, he describes himself as being "inclined towards the spirit" and meditation.

Kerrison was a believer of the 2012 phenomenon and is a doomsday prepper. In 2009, he began building a bunker home in Northland out of shipping containers and shotcrete, dubbed the "ark", purpose-built to survive an apocalypse scenario. However, Kerrison's doomsday beliefs had softened by late 2012, and he told reporters that he and his family would not use the bunker as it could not be completed in time. In 2013, he retrospectively stated that he did not believe 2012 would be the end of the world, but that it would be "the end of time [....] the start of a whole new sequence."

=== Political views ===
Kerrison is politically vocal and has endorsed fringe beliefs on the COVID-19 response and 2012 calendar predictions, branded a conspiracy theorist by some media outlets and journalists. In response, Kerrison has argued that having conflicting opinions is part of a healthy democracy, but conceded some of his views had put a strain on his relationship with members of Opshop.

Kerrison was against the COVID-19 mandates and participated in the 2022 Wellington protest, in support of anti-mandate protesters critical of the government COVID-19 response and vaccination mandate. In particular, Kerrison believed that debate on vaccine mandates and the national lockdown was being unduly shutdown and experts with dissenting opinions were being "muzzled." He took a stance against requiring proof of vaccination to attend events, and pulled out of a Christchurch performance which required them, believing his attendance would be hypocritical.

In 2022, Kerrison was criticised after getting into a Twitter spat with journalists Hilary Barry and Russel Brown regarding the anti-science views of some of the Wellington protesters, after sending them images depicting Nazi war criminals being executed. Kerrison subsequently removed the posts and apologised after he was accused of "veiled death threats." He later stated he did not regret criticising Barry's posts, but regretted posting the image without properly considering the source or the impact it would have.

In 2024, Kerrison collaborated with Jesse Wilde in an anti-mandate protest single "We Had A Choice?". In an interview with conspiracy theorist Liz Gunn, Wilde said the song was inspired by his inability to travel to the 2022 Wellington protest after failing a COVID-19 rapid antigen test while unvaccinated. Kerrison was not interviewed about the song.

=== Charity ===
Kerrison has performed in a number of charity events in support of local causes.

In 2009, Kerrison performed in the Starship Supernova Swing concert alongside Lucy Lawless, fundraising for Starship Children's Hospital. In 2015, he contributed to the All Blacks charity song Team Ball Player Thing, a project for research charity Cure Kids.

Following the 2010 Canterbury earthquake, Kerrison partnered with Paul Ellis to create Band Together, a relief concert held in Hagley Park. It featured 26 acts and several local media personalities, and was attended by then prime minister John Key.

In 2023, Kerrison performed at Mike King's Gumboot Friday concert to raise money for mental health.

In 2024, Kerrison performed in a fundraiser for fellow artist Rowdy Rose to attend the USA Radio Awards in Pennsylvania.

== Awards ==
Kerrison has won nine NZ Music awards, mainly in relation to his work with Opshop, and has been recognised for his contribution to the New Zealand music scene, including receiving the APRA Silver Scroll Award for his work writing "One Day".

In 2011, Kerrison was made a member of the New Zealand Order of Merit for services to music in the Queen's Birthday Honours List. In 2015, he received the Southland Music Ambassador award at the ILT Southland Entertainment Awards.

== Discography ==
=== Singles and EPs ===
- "You Want Me as Me" (2015)
- #JKEP1 (2015)
- #JKEP2 (2016)
- "A Wonderful Way" (2017)
- "Humming Along" (2017)
- "I Will if You Will" (2019)
- "The Timing" (2021)
- "Someone Should Love You" (2022)

=== As featured artist ===
- "Walking Away" by K.One (2010)
- "Nothing More for Xmas" by Mike Puru (2010)
- "Team Ball Player Thing" by KiwisCureBatten (2015)
- "Warrior Spirit" by Jackie Bristow (2016)
- "Pray for the Love" by Jackie Bristow (2019)
- "Listen with Your Heart" by Tihei (2019)
- "We Had a Choice?" by Jesse Wilde (2024)
