= Chaplin (film) =

1992 film by Richard Attenborough

- Theatrical release poster
- Directed by: Richard Attenborough
- Screenplay by: William Boyd; Bryan Forbes; William Goldman
- Story by: Diana Hawkins
- Based on: My Autobiography by Charles Chaplin; Chaplin: His Life and Art by David Robinson
- Produced by: Richard Attenborough; Mario Kassar
- Starring: Robert Downey Jr.; Dan Aykroyd; Geraldine Chaplin; Kevin Dunn; Anthony Hopkins; Milla Jovovich; Moira Kelly; Kevin Kline; Diane Lane; Penelope Ann Miller; Paul Rhys; John Thaw; Marisa Tomei; Nancy Travis; James Woods
- Cinematography: Sven Nykvist
- Edited by: Anne V. Coates
- Music by: John Barry
- Production companies: Carolco Pictures; Le Studio Canal+; RCS Video
- Distributed by: Guild Film Distribution (United Kingdom); TriStar Pictures (United States theatrical, Latin America, French-speaking Belgium, Spain and Scandinavia)
- Release dates: December 17, 1992 (United Kingdom); December 25, 1992 (United States)
- Running time: 145 minutes
- Countries: United Kingdom; United States
- Language: English
- Budget: $31 million
- Box office: $12 million (US/UK)

Chaplin is a 1992 biographical film about the life of English comic actor and filmmaker Charlie Chaplin. It was produced and directed by Richard Attenborough and stars Robert Downey Jr., Marisa Tomei, Dan Aykroyd, Penelope Ann Miller and Kevin Kline. It also features Charlie Chaplin's own daughter, Geraldine Chaplin, in the role of his mother, Hannah Chaplin.

The film was adapted by William Boyd, Bryan Forbes and William Goldman from Chaplin's 1964 book My Autobiography and the 1985 book Chaplin: His Life and Art by film critic David Robinson. Associate producer Diana Hawkins got a story credit. The original music score was composed by John Barry.

The film was a box office bomb, grossing $12 million against a $31 million budget, and received mixed reviews from critics; Downey's titular performance garnered critical acclaim and won him the BAFTA Award for Best Actor along with nominations for the Academy Award for Best Actor and Golden Globe Award for Best Actor – Motion Picture Drama.

== Plot ==
An elderly Charlie Chaplin reminisces during a 1962 conversation in Switzerland with George Hayden, the fictionalized editor of his book My Autobiography.

In the Victorian era South London, Chaplin escapes his poverty-stricken childhood by immersing himself in the world of variety circuit. In 1894, after his mother Hannah loses her voice onstage, five-year-old Charlie takes her place. Hannah is eventually committed to an asylum after developing psychosis. Over the years, Chaplin and his brother Sydney gain work with variety producer Fred Karno, who later sends him to the United States. He soon proposes to his girlfriend, dancer Hetty Kelly. However, Kelly declines, reasoning that she is too young. Chaplin vows to return when he is a success.

In the United States, famous comedy producer Mack Sennett employs Chaplin. He creates the Tramp persona, and due to the terrible directorial abilities of Sennett's girlfriend Mabel Normand, he becomes his own director. After Sydney becomes his manager, Chaplin breaks from Sennett to gain creative control over his films, with the goal of one day owning his own studio. In 1917, he completes work on his film The Immigrant and starts a two-year relationship with actress Edna Purviance.

Years later, at a party thrown by Douglas Fairbanks, Chaplin dates child actress Mildred Harris. He sets up his own studio and becomes "the most famous man in the world" before his 30th birthday. Chaplin tells Fairbanks that he must marry Harris because she is pregnant but later learns that it is a hoax. Chaplin has a confrontation with J. Edgar Hoover about actor/directors and propaganda. This sparks a 40-year-long vendetta by Hoover.

Harris's divorce lawyers claim Chaplin's film The Kid as an asset. Chaplin and Sydney flee with the footage, finish editing it in a Salt Lake City hotel, then smuggle it back to Los Angeles.

The brothers arrange for Hannah to join them, but Chaplin cannot cope with her worsened condition. In 1921, Chaplin attends the UK premiere of The Kid. He hopes to locate Hetty, but soon learns that she died in the influenza epidemic. The British working class resent him for not joining the British armed forces during World War I as they did.

Back in the United States, Hoover digs into Chaplin's private life, suspecting him of Pro-Soviet sympathies. Chaplin is forced to consider the effect of "talkies" on his career. Despite the popularity of sound films, he vows never to make a talkie featuring the Tramp.

In 1925, Chaplin makes The Gold Rush and marries bit-part actress Lita Grey. However, he later says to George that he always thought of her as a "total bitch" and barely mentions her in his autobiography. Chaplin marries Paulette Goddard and feels a sense of guilt and sympathy for the millions unemployed due to the Wall Street crash. Chaplin decides to address the issue in Modern Times, but his dedication to this film results in the breakup of his marriage.

At an industry party, the partially Roma Chaplin refuses to shake hands with a visiting Nazi. Fairbanks comments that Chaplin resembles Adolf Hitler, inspiring him to create The Great Dictator. The film, which satirizes Nazism, is a hit worldwide and further enrages Hoover, who believes it to be propaganda against the United States.

Chaplin marries actress Oona O'Neill, who resembles Hetty. However, it is alleged that he is the father of the child of former lover Joan Barry. Despite a blood test proving that the child is not his, Chaplin is ordered to provide financial support after the test is declared inadmissible in court. With his reputation damaged, he stays out of the public eye for over seven years until producing Limelight. During McCarthyism, the Chaplins leave the United States together on a visit to Britain, but then the United States Attorney General revokes his re-entry permit.

In 1972, Chaplin is invited back to the United States to receive a special Academy Honorary Award. Despite being initially resentful after two decades in exile and certain that no one will even remember him, he is moved to tears when the audience laughs at footage from his films and gives Chaplin the Academy Awards' longest standing ovation ever.

== Cast ==
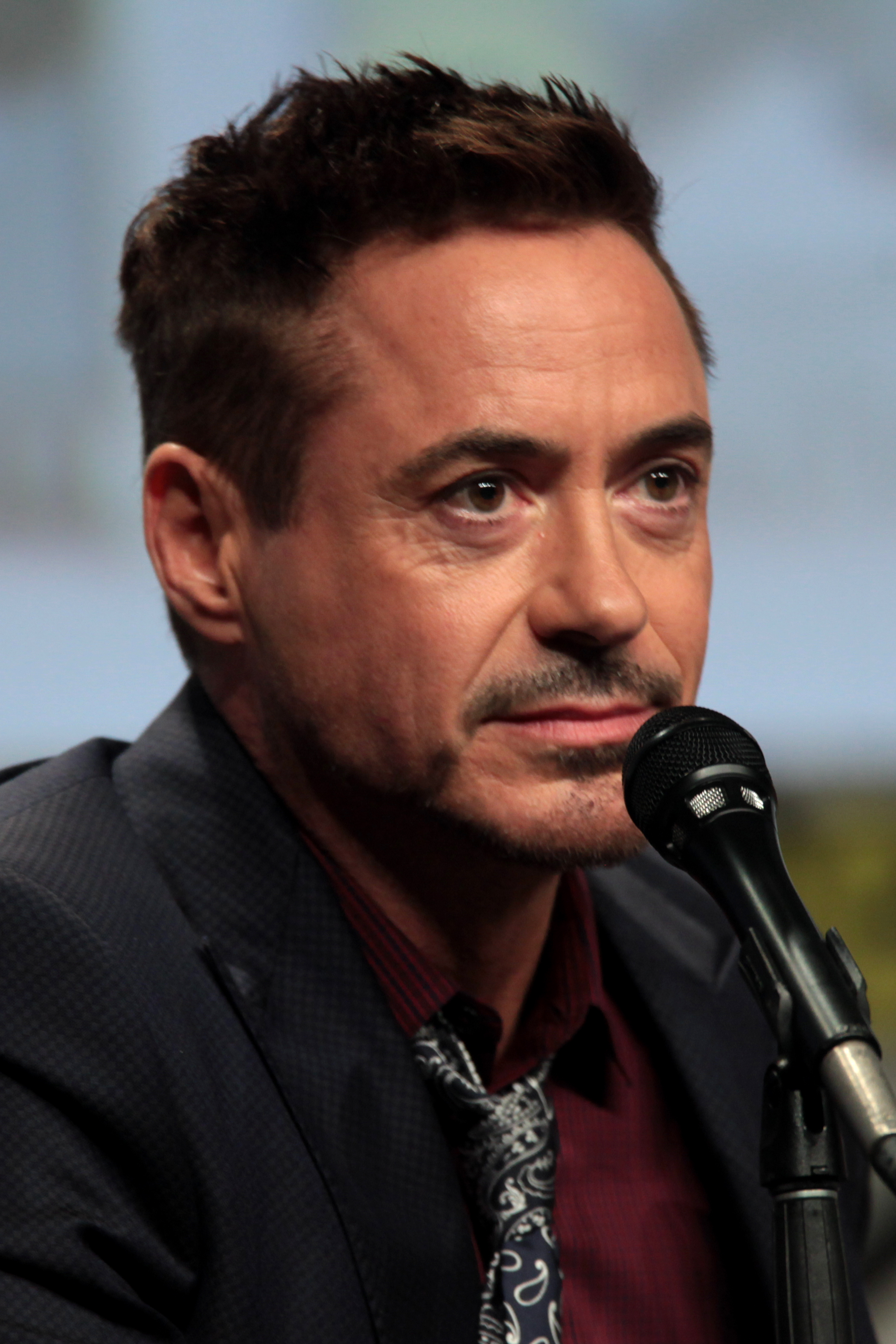
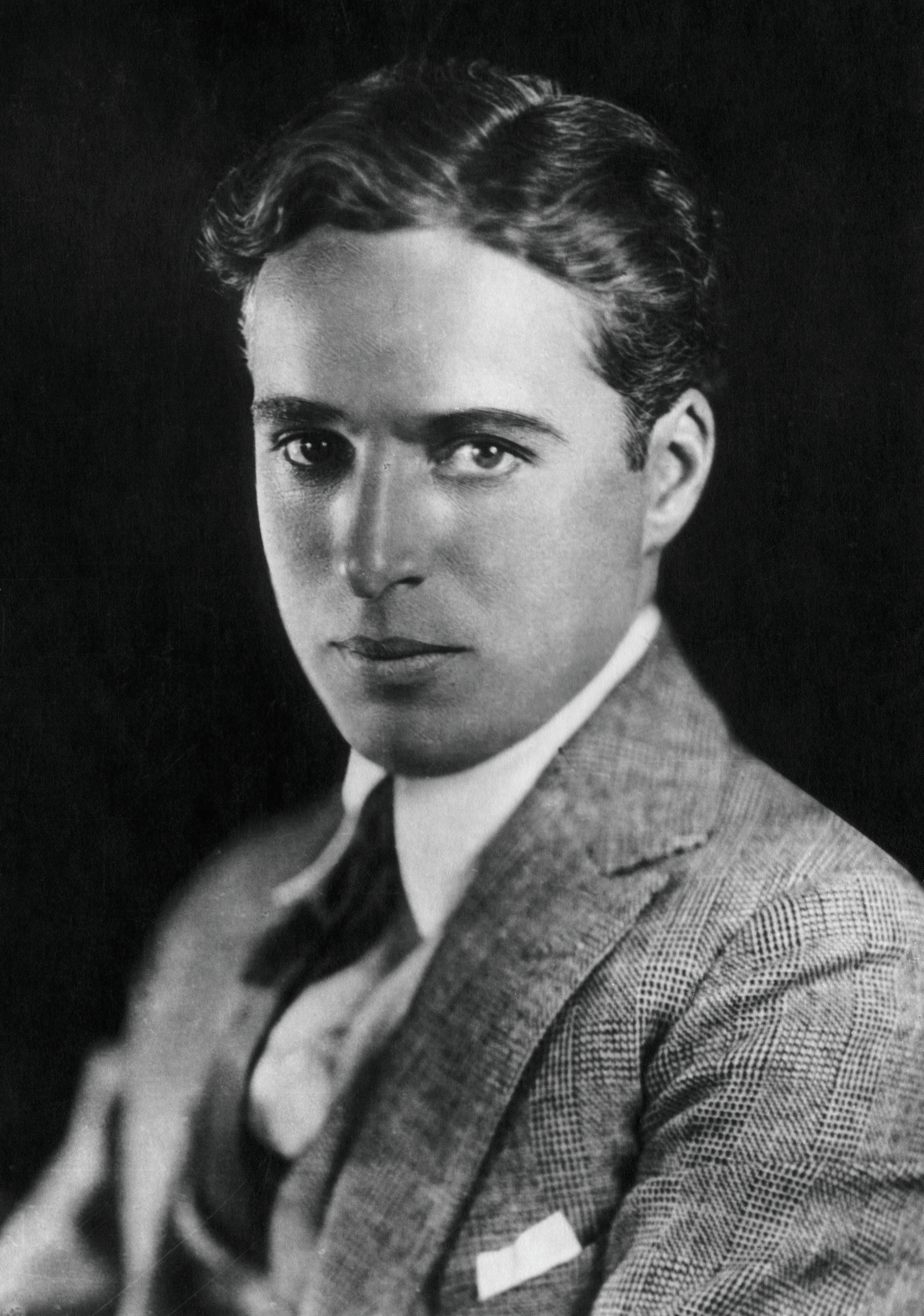
Robert Downey Jr. (left) played Charlie Chaplin
- Robert Downey Jr. as Charlie Chaplin
  - Tom Bradford as Charlie Chaplin (age 14)
  - Hugh Downer as Charlie Chaplin (age 5)
- Dan Aykroyd as Mack Sennett
- Geraldine Chaplin as Hannah Chaplin, Charlie's mother
- Kevin Dunn as FBI Director J. Edgar Hoover
- Anthony Hopkins as George Hayden, Chaplin's biography editor
- Milla Jovovich as Mildred Harris, a young Hollywood actress and Charlie's first wife
- Moira Kelly as:
  - Hetty Kelly, Charlie's first love
  - Oona O'Neill, Charlie's fourth and last wife
- Kevin Kline as Douglas Fairbanks
- Diane Lane as Paulette Goddard, Charlie's third wife
- Penelope Ann Miller as Edna Purviance
- Paul Rhys as Sydney Chaplin, Charlie's older maternal half-brother
  - Nicholas Gatt as Sydney Chaplin (age 9)
- John Thaw as Fred Karno, a British music-hall impresario
- Marisa Tomei as Mabel Normand
- Nancy Travis as Joan Barry, a young Hollywood actress
- James Woods as Joseph Scott, a California attorney
- Michael Blevins as David Raksin
- Francesca Buller as Minnie Chaplin, Sydney's wife
- Matthew Cottle as Stan Laurel
- Peter Crook as Frank Arthur Hooper
- David Duchovny as Roland Totheroh, Chaplin's longtime cameraman
- Donnie Kehr as Sound Engineer
- Karen Lewis as Yankee Doodle Dancer
- Deborah Maria Moore as Lita Grey, a young Hollywood actress and Charlie's second wife
- Sean O'Bryan as Lewis Seeley
- Bill Paterson as Stage Manager
- Maria Pitillo as Mary Pickford
- Gerald Sim as Doctor
- Graham Sinclair as Master of Ceremonies
- John Standing as Chaplin's butler
- Robert Stephens as Ted the Drunk
- Norbert Weisser as German Diplomat
- Michael Goorjian as Charlie Chaplin Jr., Charlie & Lita's first son
  - Sky Rumph as Charlie Chaplin Jr. (age 7)
- Michael Cade as Sydney Chaplin II, Charlie & Lita's second son
  - Bradley Pierce as Sydney Chaplin II (age 8)

In addition, the Academy Award tribute sequence at the end features footage of the real Chaplin.

== Production ==
Richard Attenborough acquired the rights to Chaplin's 1964 memoir My Autobiography and footage from his films at the invitation of Chaplin's widow, Oona O'Neill, in 1988 and intended to make it with Universal Pictures. According to Marc Wanamaker, who served as an advisor on the film, Attenborough had thought of making a miniseries at one point, to fully explore Chaplin's life.

Attenborough hired Bryan Forbes to write the script. The director recalled "What I didn't appreciate until far too late was that he [Forbes] also strongly disapproved of Chaplin, considering his passionately held political views naive, his oeuvre vastly overrated and much of his personal life despicable." Forbes did several drafts, which Universal was unhappy with, resulting in Attenborough having to fire Forbes, which put strain on their friendship. The next draft was done by William Boyd.

Attenborough considered Anthony Sher for the title role, but changed his mind after a screen test.

Although Attenborough wanted Robert Downey Jr. for the part of Chaplin, studio executives wanted Robin Williams or Billy Crystal for the role. Jim Carrey was also considered, as was Tom Hanks. On David Letterman's Netflix series My Next Guest Needs No Introduction, Downey Jr. revealed that Attenborough had also been interested in Tom Cruise for the role, but Cruise declined the offer. After Attenborough cast Downey, Universal put the film in a turnaround which resulted Attenborough spending the next 10 months to found another financier; until he eventually settled on Carolco Pictures.

The film had a four-hour cut that was later edited down to two and a half hours for release.

This was the first film in which Dunn, Hopkins and Woods acted together, (the second being Nixon in 1995).

== Reception ==
=== Critical reception ===
The film received mixed reviews, lauded for its high production values, but many critics dismissed it as an overly glossy biopic. Although the film was criticized for taking dramatic license with some aspects of Chaplin's life, Downey's performance as Chaplin won universal acclaim. Attenborough was sufficiently confident in Downey's performance to include historical footage of Chaplin himself at the end of the film. According to the review aggregator website Rotten Tomatoes, 62% of critics have given Chaplin a positive review based on 53 reviews, with an average rating of 6.30/10. The website's critics consensus reads, "Chaplin boasts a terrific performance from Robert Downey, Jr. in the title role, but it isn't enough to overcome a formulaic biopic that pales in comparison to its subject's classic films." At Metacritic, the film has a weighted average score of 47 out of 100 based on 22 critics, indicating "mixed or average" reviews. Audiences polled by CinemaScore gave the film an "A–" on an A+ to F scale.

Vincent Canby of The New York Times lauded Downey's performance, and deemed the film "extremely appreciative". Todd McCarthy of Variety remarked that Chaplin's life was too grand to be properly captured in a film, criticizing the screenplay, but praised the casting and the film's first hour.

Roger Ebert of The Chicago Sun-Times gave the film two out of four stars, dubbing the film, "a disappointing, misguided movie that has all of the parts in place to be a much better one", but praised Downey and the production values. Kenneth Turan of the Los Angeles Times felt Attenborough's filmmaking and Chaplin's life were ill-suited to each other, but said of Downey, "Lithe and lively and looking remarkably like the younger Chaplin, Downey does more than master the man's celebrated duck walk and easy grace. In one of those acts of will and creativity that actors come up with when you least expect it, Downey becomes Chaplin, re-creating his character and his chilly soul so precisely that even the comedian's daughter Geraldine, a featured player here, was both impressed and unnerved."

Anne Cotes said "the film's worst fault is, it's episodic" and that "It's not funny enough."

=== Box office ===
The film grossed £1.8 million ($2.7 million) in the United Kingdom and $9.5 million in the United States.

=== Accolades ===
Award	Category	Nominee(s)	Result	Ref.
Academy Awards	Best Actor	Robert Downey Jr.	Nominated	
Academy Awards	Best Art Direction	Art Direction: Stuart Craig; Set Decoration: Chris A. Butler	Nominated	
Academy Awards	Best Original Score	John Barry	Nominated	
Artios Awards	Best Casting for Feature Film – Drama	Mike Fenton	Nominated	
British Academy Film Awards	Best Actor in a Leading Role	Robert Downey Jr.	Won	
British Academy Film Awards	Best Costume Design	John Mollo and Ellen Mirojnick	Nominated	
British Academy Film Awards	Best Make-Up	Wally Schneiderman, Jill Rockow, and John Caglione Jr.	Nominated	
British Academy Film Awards	Best Production Design	Stuart Craig	Nominated	
British Society of Cinematographers Awards	Best Cinematography in a Theatrical Feature Film	Sven Nykvist	Nominated	
Chicago Film Critics Association Awards	Best Actor	Robert Downey Jr.	Nominated	
Chicago Film Critics Association Awards	Most Promising Actress	Marisa Tomei (also for My Cousin Vinny)	Won	
Fantasporto	International Fantasy Film	Richard Attenborough	Nominated	
Golden Globe Awards	Best Actor in a Motion Picture – Drama	Robert Downey Jr.	Nominated	
Golden Globe Awards	Best Supporting Actress – Motion Picture	Geraldine Chaplin	Nominated	
Golden Globe Awards	Best Original Score – Motion Picture	John Barry	Nominated	
London Film Critics Circle Awards	Actor of the Year	Robert Downey Jr.	Won	
Moscow International Film Festival	Golden St. George	Richard Attenborough	Nominated	

=== Home media ===
The film was released on VHS and LaserDisc in June 1993 and later on DVD in 1997, and on LaserDisc by Live Home Video on July 5, 1998. A 15th-anniversary edition was released by Lions Gate Entertainment (who obtained the distribution rights to the film in the interim under license from the copyright holder, StudioCanal) in 2008. The anniversary edition contained extensive interviews with the producers, and included several minutes of home-movie footage shot on Chaplin's yacht. The box for this DVD mistakenly lists the film's running time as 135 minutes, although it retains the 145-minute length of the original theatrical release.

The 15th Anniversary Edition was released on Blu-ray on February 15, 2011.

== Soundtrack ==
The soundtrack to Chaplin was released on December 15, 1992.

A newly expanded soundtrack with 35 tracks to celebrate the film's 30 anniversary was released by La La Land Records in 2023.

Track listing
No.	Title	Artist	Length
1.	"Chaplin - Main Theme"	John Barry	3:06
2.	"Early Days in London"	John Barry	4:18
3.	"Charlie Proposes"	John Barry	3:01
4.	"To California / The Cutting Room"	John Barry	3:45
5.	"Discovering the Tramp / The Wedding Chase"	John Barry	4:01
6.	"Chaplin's Studio Opening"	John Barry	1:58
7.	"Salt Lake City Episode"	John Barry	2:11
8.	"The Roll Dance"	John Barry	2:34
9.	"News of Hetty's Death / Smile"	John Barry	3:42
10.	"From London to L.A."	John Barry	3:21
11.	"Joan Barry Trouble / Oona Arrives"	John Barry	2:15
12.	"Remembering Hetty"	John Barry	2:57
13.	"Smile"	Charles Chaplin	2:06
14.	"The Roll Dance"	John Barry	1:47
15.	"Chaplin - Main Theme / Smile"	John Barry	4:46
16.	"Smile (Performed by Robert Downey Jr.)"	John Barry	3:38
Total length:			49:26
