= Party Never Ends (disambiguation) =

Party Never Ends is the third studio album recorded by Romanian singer Inna in 2013.

Party Never Ends may also refer to:

- "The Party Never Ends", a song by Kasabian from their 2017 album For Crying Out Loud
- The Party Never Ends, a posthumous album released in 2024 by American rapper Juice Wrld

== See also ==
- The Party Never Stops: Diary of a Binge Drinker, a 2007 television film
