= Chelsea Hobbs =

Canadian actress (born 1985)

- Born: February 18, 1985 (age 41); Vancouver, British Columbia, Canada
- Occupation: Actress
- Years active: 1994–present
- Spouses: Teren Oddo (m. 2007; div. 2014) James Neate (m. 2020; div. 2024)
- Children: 4

Chelsea Hobbs (born February 18, 1985) is a Canadian actress. She is known for roles such as Gerda in the 2002 television film Snow Queen and Emily Kmetko in the ABC Family teen drama Make It or Break It.

== Early life ==
Hobbs attended an advanced secondary school arts curriculum school, being enrolled in an intensive acting program. Starting at age three, she began dancing.

== Career ==
During her youth, Hobbs has appeared in over 40 commercials, and has appeared in the kids' improvisational TV series, No Adults Aloud. Her lead role as "Gerda" in Hallmark's Snow Queen and subsequent Leo Award nomination led to a TV pilot, Save the Last Dance. Hobbs had a recurring role on The L Word and played a part in Lords of Dogtown and Beach Girls. She has also appeared in Lifetime films such as The Party Never Stops: Diary of a Binge Drinker alongside Sara Paxton.

In 2008, Hobbs landed the leading role in the movie Confessions of a Go-Go Girl as Jane McCoy, a recent college graduate, who decides to scrap her plans for law school to pursue an acting career full-time, against her parents' wishes. In 2009, Hobbs was cast in the role of Emily Kmetko, an aspiring Olympic gymnast from the wrong side of the tracks, in ABC Family's Make It or Break It. Hobbs was absent from the final 3 episodes of season 2 of Make It or Break, as she and her husband were expecting their second child. In October 2011 she announced that she would not be returning for season 3.

In April 2010, Hobbs (playing Courtney Haywood) and her Make It or Break It co-star Cassie Scerbo (as Hillary Swanson) guest starred on the CSI: Miami episode "Spring Breakdown". In 2013, she starred in the Lifetime TV thriller The Trainer as well as HBO series The Transporter. Her 2014 credits include Hallmark's June in January and The Nine Lives of Christmas and a guest star on the television series Motive.

== Personal life ==
Hobbs married photographer Teren Oddo in 2007 but they have since divorced. The couple have two children, a daughter (born in 2006) and a son (born in 2011).

Hobbs married James Neate in 2020. The couple have two children, a son (born in May 2020) and a daughter (born in January 2022).

== Filmography ==
Film roles
Year	Title	Role	Notes
1995	Secret's Out	Vanna	
2000	Christina's House	Suzy Cooper	
2005	The Unknown	Jenny Ackers	
2005	Lords of Dogtown	Caroline	

Television roles
Year	Title	Role	Notes
1994	No Adults Aloud	Chelsea Wright	
1996	Sweet Dreams	Young Laura	Television film
1997	Perfect Body	New Gymnast	Television film
1999	Miracle on the 17th Green	Megan McKinley	Television film
2001	Mysterious Ways	14-Year-Old Girl	Episode: "Do You See What I See?"
2001	Seven Days	Amy	Episode: "The Brink"
2001	Pasadena	Meredith Weller	Recurring role, 6 episodes
2002	The Sausage Factory	Madison	Episode: "The Tux"
2002	Snow Queen	Gerda	Television film
2005	Beach Girls	Nell Kilvert	Main role
2005	More Sex and the Single Mom	Sara Gradwell	Television film
2007	The L Word	Brooke	Episodes: "Livin' La Vida Loca", "Lassoed", "Layup"
2007	The Party Never Stops: Diary of a Binge Drinker	Shanna	Television film
2008	Confessions of a Go-Go Girl	Jane McCoy	Television film
2008	Cold Case	Betty Sue Baker	Episode: "Pin Up Girl"
2009–2011	Make It or Break It	Emily Kmetko	Main role (seasons 1–2)
2010	CSI: Miami	Courtney Haywood	Episode: "Spring Breakdown"
2011	CSI: Crime Scene Investigation	Colleen Hughes	Episode: "Bittersweet"
2013	Transporter: The Series	Jet	Episode: "Cherchez la Femme"
2013	The Trainer	Annie Hogan	Television film
2014	June in January	Bethany Barnard	Television film
2014	Supernatural	Catlin	Episode: "Girls, Girls, Girls"
2014	The Nine Lives of Christmas	Blair	Television film
2015	The Unauthorized Melrose Place Story	Laura Leighton	Television film
2016	Lucifer	Christi	Episode: "Homewrecker"
2017	The Psycho She Met Online	Karen Hexley	Television film
2018	UnREAL	Charlie	Recurring role (season 3), 8 episodes
2018	Killer Ending	Caroline Villos	Television film
2018	Left for Dead	Leah	Television film
2018	Mr. 365	Sophia Worthy	Television film
2018	Take Two	Alison Hopkins	Episode: "Shadows of the Past"
2019	A Ruby Herring Mystery: Her Last Breath	Jenny Taylor	Television film
2019	The Good Doctor	Sasha Omar	Episode: "Incomplete"
2020	Killer in the Guest House	Gina Larson	Television film
2020–2021	Martha's Vineyard Mysteries	Jackie Shawl	Television film series
2021	A Mother's Fury	Elizabeth Daley	Television film; also known as Snatched from Mommy
2021	The Picture of Christmas	Ember Morely	Television film; also known as The Christmas Book
2022	The Holiday Sitter	Kathleen Walker	Television film
2023	Dream Moms	Claire Ryan	Television film
2023	Navigating Christmas	Melanie	Television film
2024	Deck the Halls on Cherry Lane	Chelsea	Television film (Hallmark)
