= Joan Barry (American actress) =

American actress (1920–2007)

- Born: Mary Louise Gribble; May 24, 1920; Detroit, Michigan, U.S.
- Died: October 1, 2007 (aged 87); New York City, U.S.
- Known for: Paternity suit with Charlie Chaplin
- Spouse: Russell Seck (m. 1946; unknown 1952)
- Partner: Charlie Chaplin (1941–1942)
- Children: 3

Mary Louise Baker (née Gribble; May 24, 1920 – October 1, 2007), known professionally as Joan Barry, was an American woman who won a paternity suit in California in 1943 against Charlie Chaplin.

== Early life ==
Born Mary Louise Gribble on May 24, 1920, in Detroit, Michigan, to James Alfred Gribble and Gertrude Elizabeth McLaren. The Gribble family moved to New York City before June 1925. James Gribble worked as a machinist in Detroit, and as car salesman in New York. Another daughter, Agnes, was born in 1923. James died by suicide on December 10, 1927. Gertrude later married a man named John Barry. Barry went to California in 1938 to pursue an acting career.

== Chaplin affair and aftermath ==
Barry, 21 years old, began an affair with established director Charlie Chaplin, aged 52 years, in the summer of 1941; Chaplin had his studio sign Barry at $75 a week ($1,640 today) with possibility of extension, and came to consider her for the starring role in Shadow and Substance, a film proposed for 1942. Chaplin spoke highly of her acting abilities; Chaplin biographer David Robinson writes in Chaplin: A Life of "Chaplin's sincerity in believing that he could make Joan Barry into an actress.... [as] she had ‘all the qualities of a new Maude Adams' and told his sons, ‘She has a quality, an ethereal something that's truly marvelous…a talent as great as any I've seen in my whole life.” Other sources, including FBI case records and Chaplin autobiographical writings, indicate the young actress to have had talent at her craft, as well as emotional swings and periods of erratic behavior. According to Chaplin and some Chaplin biographers the relationship ended with Barry's harassing him and displaying signs of the mental illness which would, in later life, lead to her commitment. Barry was accused of stalking Chaplin, and had even broken into his home on several occasions. Other sources suggest that after a concerted effort by Chaplin and his studio to prepare Barry for the lead in Shadows, including orthodontic work and participation at the Max Reinhardt Workshop for acting, Chaplin lost his patience with Barry as an actress after she repeatedly missed classes and developed a drinking problem.

FBI case files and other records recorded two terminated pregnancies during the affair. After Barry gave birth to a girl, Carol Ann, on October 2, 1943, her mother filed a paternity suit against Chaplin. The suit proceeded to trial, and despite blood tests which showed Chaplin was not the father, Barry's attorney, Joseph Scott, succeeded in arguing that the tests were inadmissible. Chaplin was ordered to support the child until her 21st birthday. Federal prosecutors brought Mann Act charges against Chaplin related to Barry in 1944, of which he was acquitted.

== Personal life ==
Barry married Russell Seck, a railway clerk, in 1946. The couple had two sons, who moved to Ohio with their father in 1952.

The following year, when she was 33, Time noted that Barry was "admitted to Patton State Hospital... after she was found walking the streets barefoot, carrying a pair of baby sandals and a child's ring, and murmuring: 'This is magic'." After her mother was committed, Carol Ann went to live with a legally appointed guardian and changed her name. She continued to receive monthly payments from Chaplin until her 21st birthday.

== In popular culture ==
In Richard Attenborough's film Chaplin (1992), she is played by Nancy Travis.

She is featured as a character in Wieland Schwanebeck's play Slapstick (2021), a comedy based on the encounter between Orson Welles and Charlie Chaplin that led to the film Monsieur Verdoux (1947).
