= Night of the Animated Dead =

- Official release poster
- Directed by: Jason Axinn
- Based on: Night of the Living Dead by George A. Romero and John A. Russo
- Produced by: Michael J. Luisi; Ralph E. Portillo; Robert Feldman; Kevin Kasha
- Starring: Josh Duhamel; Dulé Hill; Katharine Isabelle; James Roday Rodriguez; Katee Sackhoff; Will Sasso; Jimmi Simpson; Nancy Travis
- Edited by: Jason Axinn
- Music by: Nima Fakhrara
- Production companies: Warner Bros. Animation; The Long Game; Hemisphere Entertainment
- Distributed by: Warner Bros. Home Entertainment
- Release date: September 21, 2021
- Running time: 71 minutes
- Country: United States
- Language: English

Night of the Animated Dead is a 2021 American adult animated zombie horror film directed by Jason Axinn and featuring the voices of Josh Duhamel, Dulé Hill, Katharine Isabelle, James Roday Rodriguez, Katee Sackhoff, Will Sasso, Jimmi Simpson and Nancy Travis. It is an adaptation of the 1968 George A. Romero film Night of the Living Dead.

== Plot ==
John and his sister Barbara drive to a Pennsylvania cemetery to visit their father's grave. Unbeknownst to the siblings, an undead outbreak causes corpses to reanimate across the country at the same time. A zombie in the cemetery attacks and kills John. Barbara flees to a nearby farmhouse and once inside she tries to use the telephone, but the zombies have torn down the land line connected to the house. She explores the house and finds a woman who lived there dead and half-eaten. Ben, another survivor seeking shelter from the growing zombie horde, joins Barbara in the house. He explains that he came across a radio broadcast from an abandon truck parked at Beekman's Diner earlier reporting violent incidents around the country and witnessed a propane truck being attacked by zombies and crashed into a gas station which caught on fire, killing the driver trapped inside, and attracting more zombies coming from the diner. Some of the zombies at the gas station were burned in the fire while others stayed away from the flames because they are afraid of fire and electric lights. He also explains the truck is near empty and there is a gas pump outside, but it is locked and they need to find a key to leave and find help.

With Barbara in a state of catatonic shock, Ben fights off zombies with a torch and a lever action rifle and begins boarding up the windows by himself. Ben and Barbara discover cowardly Harry Cooper hiding in the cellar with his wife Helen and their injured daughter Karen along with a young man named Tom and his girlfriend Judy. Harry, Karen and Helen were traveling when they were attacked by the zombies that overturned their car and Karen was bitten in the arm. They cross paths with Tom and Judy and hid in the farmhouse. Animosity forms when Ben asks for help fortifying the house while Harry insists on everyone bunkering in the cellar instead.

A TV news bulletin suggests the undead outbreak may have been caused by radiation from a probe returning from Venus. The TV and radio news reports of a wave of mass murder being committed across the east coast of the United States by an army of cannibalistic, reanimating corpses, and groups of armed men patrolling the countryside to kill the ghouls. They confirm that the ghouls can be stopped with a bullet or heavy blow to the head or by being burned, as Ben discovered, and that various rescue centers are offering refuge and safety.

The men devise an escape plan that involves gassing up at a nearby pump so they can flee in the truck Ben arrived in. Tom and Judy drive the truck while Ben uses a torch to ward off zombies from the back. At the pump, the keys that Tom found in the house do not work so Ben shoots the lock off, but when they pull out the nozzle out, gas spills on the torch and causes the truck to catch fire. Tom drives the truck away from the pump and the engine explodes. Shrapnel kills Tom and Judy before they could escape. Ben fights his way back to the house, but Harry refuses to let him inside. Ben breaks in anyway and beats Harry to the floor after barricading the door. Another TV news report shows Sheriff McClelland leading a large group of deputies, policemen and armed civilians to hunt and kill the undead ghouls.

Zombies besiege the farmhouse. Harry and Ben struggle for the rifle and Ben shoots Harry in his stomach during the melee. Harry stumbles down to the cellar. Helen soon follows only to find their daughter Karen eating at Harry's corpse. Karen then stabs her mother to death with a gardening trowel. The zombie horde pulls Barbara outside. With the house now overrun, Ben bunkers in the basement. Harry's mutilated corpse reanimates, but Ben shoots it in the head and then shoots a dead but not yet reanimated Helen in the head as a precaution.

In the morning, Sheriff McClelland's men arrive outside, and they begin dispatching zombies. Hearing the gunshots and police dogs barking, Ben goes back upstairs and toward a window to investigate. Mistaking him for a zombie at a distance, Sheriff McClelland directs a man named Vince to shoot Ben in the head. Ben's body is then dragged to a pile of executed zombies that the men set on fire.

== Voice cast ==
- Josh Duhamel as Harry Cooper
- Katee Sackhoff as Judy
- Dulé Hill as Ben
- Katharine Isabelle as Barbara
- James Roday Rodriguez as Tom
- Nancy Travis as Helen Cooper
- Will Sasso as Sheriff McClelland
- Jimmi Simpson as Johnny
- Ashley Lambert as Karen Cooper
- Stefan Marks as Vince
- Ian Duncan as Dr. Grimes
- Kirk Baily as Truck Driver

== Release ==
The film was released in digital platforms on September 21, 2021, and on DVD and Blu-ray October 5, 2021.

== Reception ==
The film has a 25 percent rating on Rotten Tomatoes based on eight reviews.

Rosie Knight of IGN gave the film a negative review and wrote, "...sadly, it does absolutely nothing to justify its own existence. Instead, it's a tired retread that weakens the impact of the original without adding anything of value including, most importantly, good animation."
