= My Autobiography (Chaplin book) =

Autobiographical work by Charlie Chaplin

- Author: Charlie Chaplin
- Publisher: Simon and Schuster
- Publication date: 1964
- ISBN: 0-671-24843-0
- OCLC: 803451845
- Dewey Decimal: 791.430924
- LC Class: PN2287.C5 A32

My Autobiography is a book by Charlie Chaplin, first published by Simon & Schuster in 1964. Along with Chaplin: His Life and Art (1985), it provided the source material for the 1992 feature film Chaplin. It provides a revealing look into the life of a 20th-century filmmaker and celebrity. The Chicago Tribune described the book as "The best autobiography ever written by an actor. An astonishing work.” In 2020, The Guardian ranked the book at No. 11 in its list of "The top 25 most compelling Hollywood autobiographies".
