= Susan Wright (murderer) =

American convicted murderer (born 1976)

- Born: Susan Lucille Wyche; April 24, 1976 (age 50); Houston, Texas, U.S.
- Spouse: Jeffrey Andrew Wright (deceased)
- Children: Bradley and Kailey Wright
- Status: Paroled
- Motive: Spousal abuse (claimed)
- Conviction: Murder
- Penalty: 25 years imprisonment; resentenced to 20 years imprisonment

Details
- Victims: Jeffrey Andrew Wright
- Date: January 13, 2003
- Location: Unincorporated Harris County, Texas
- Weapon: Knife
- Date apprehended: January 24, 2003
- Imprisoned at: Christina Melton Crain Unit

Susan Lucille Wright (born April 24, 1976) is an American convicted murderer from Houston, Texas, who made headlines in 2003 for stabbing her husband, Jeff Wright, 193 times in an act of mariticide and then burying his body in their backyard. She was convicted of murder in 2004, and was given a 20-year sentence at the Crain Unit in Gatesville, Texas. She was denied parole on June 12, 2014, and July 24, 2017. She was granted parole in July 2020 and released from prison on December 30, 2020.

On April 30, 2026, Wright was arrested in a hit-and-run incident in Harris County.

== Early life ==
Susan Lucille Wright was born on April 24, 1976, in Houston, Texas, to Sue Wella (née Tschoepe) and Jimmy Lawrence Wyche. At the age of 17, she worked as a topless dancer at Gold Cup for two months. In 1997, while working as a restaurant waitress in Galveston, Texas, she met Jeff Wright and they married in 1998 while she was eight-and-a-half months pregnant with their first child. In 2002, a daughter was born. Mrs. Wright claims that her husband began to abuse her during the first few years of their marriage.

== Crime ==
The crime occurred at the Wright family house in the White Oak Bend subdivision in an unincorporated area of northwest Harris County, Texas.

According to evidence presented by the prosecution, on January 13, 2003, Susan Wright, 26, tied her husband, Jeff Wright, 34, to their bed and stabbed him 193 times with two different knives. She buried his body in their Houston backyard. She attempted to cover up the crime scene by painting the bedroom. The next day, Wright filed a false domestic abuse report in order to get a restraining order against her husband.

On January 18, Wright asked her attorney, Neal Davis, to come to her home and admitted to stabbing her husband. Davis contacted the Harris County's district attorney's office to inform it that a body was buried under Susan Wright's house and that she had confessed to the killing.

Wright turned herself in to authorities at the Harris County Courthouse on January 24 and was arraigned on murder charges the following Monday.

== Trial ==
Thirteen months after her arraignment, Wright's murder trial commenced on February 24, 2004. She had already pleaded not guilty to killing her husband by reason of self-defense.

Assistant district attorney Kelly Siegler depicted Wright as a scheming wife who seduced her husband into bed, tied him up, repeatedly stabbed him, and then buried his body in their backyard in hopes of collecting a $200,000 life insurance policy. Wright's defense attorney Neal Davis claimed that his client had suffered years of physical and emotional abuse by her husband and killed him to protect herself and her two young children.

At her trial, Susan Wright testified in her own defense. In her emotional testimony on the stand, Wright claimed: "I couldn't stop stabbing him; I couldn't stop. I knew as soon as I stopped, he was going to get the knife back and he was going to kill me. I didn't want to die." She testified that on the night of the murder, Jeff Wright was on a cocaine binge and was violent, having allegedly beaten her. Wright again insisted that she stabbed her husband in self-defense. Susan Wright's mother testified for the defense, claiming they witnessed Wright's bruises.

Siegler said Wright's tears were faked to try and sway the jury. The prosecution presented an unusual demonstration by bringing the Wrights' actual bed into the courtroom.

During closing arguments, Siegler brought up to the jury how Wright had been a topless dancer and said she believed Wright's emotions were insincere. She contended that Susan Wright was a "card-carrying, obvious, no-doubt-about-it, caught-red handed, confirmed, documented liar" whose frequent shows of emotion during the trial were deliberate efforts to influence the jury.

== Verdict ==
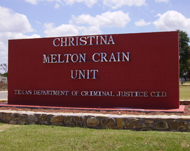
Christina Crain Unit, where Wright was held

On March 3, 2004, after more than five hours of deliberations, the jury convicted Wright of murder. Wright showed little reaction to the guilty verdict.

Wright was sentenced on the following day. Prosecutors were hoping for at least a 55-year sentence, and Wright's attorneys argued for probation for their client. The jury sentenced Wright to 25 years in prison.

She was imprisoned at the Crain Unit, under SID Number: 04835513.

== Appeal ==
In 2005, the Fourteenth Court of Appeals of Texas in Houston upheld Susan Wright's conviction.

With a re-appeal in 2008, a new witness, Misty McMichael, the wife of former NFL Super Bowl champion Steve McMichael and ex-fiancée of Jeff Wright, came forward to tell her story of how she endured abuse and violence during her four-year relationship with Jeff Wright.

In 2009, the Texas Court of Criminal Appeals granted Wright a new sentencing hearing, after determining that Wright's "counsel rendered ineffective assistance during the punishment phase of trial" in 2004.

On November 20, 2010, Wright had her sentence reduced to 20 years in prison, five years less than her original sentence. Wright was first eligible for parole on February 28, 2014, at the age of 38. She was denied parole on June 12, 2014, and again on July 24, 2017. Wright was approved for parole on July 2, 2020.

On Wednesday, December 30, 2020, Wright was released on parole at the age of 44.

== Hit & run charge ==
On April 30, 2026, Wright - who now goes by her maiden name Wyche - was arrested for a hit-and-run crash in Harris County. The charging document is sparse on details, and did not immediately indicate the seriousness of the crash, but court records state that the damage to the other vehicle was at least $200.

== In popular culture ==
Wright's murder trial had been nationally televised on CourtTV. Wright's case was also profiled on Snapped in 2004, 48 Hours Mystery in 2005, on an E! special entitled Women Who Kill, on the Deadly Women episode "Lethal Love" on ID in 2011, and on an episode of Secret Lives of Stepford Wives in 2014.

Wright's case was also the subject of the 2012 Lifetime original movie Blue Eyed Butcher, starring Sara Paxton as Wright and Lisa Edelstein as Kelly Siegler.

In 2014, Canadian director Chloe Bellande released a 17-minute short film titled Will of Fortune, which was inspired by the murder trials of Wright and Guy Turcotte, a man who had stabbed his two children to death in Canada. The film premiered at the Cannes Film Festival in May 2014.

== See also ==
- Crime in Houston
