= Destiny Turns on the Radio =

1995 American comedy film

- Theatrical release poster
- Directed by: Jack Baran
- Written by: Robert Ramsey; Matthew Stone
- Produced by: Keith Samples; Gloria Zimmerman
- Starring: James LeGros; Dylan McDermott; Quentin Tarantino; Nancy Travis; James Belushi; Tracey Walter; Allen Garfield
- Cinematography: James L. Carter
- Edited by: Raúl Dávalos
- Music by: J. Steven Soles
- Production company: Rysher Entertainment
- Distributed by: Savoy Pictures
- Release date: April 28, 1995
- Running time: 102 minutes
- Country: United States
- Language: English
- Box office: $1,176,982

Destiny Turns on the Radio is a 1995 American comedy film directed by Jack Baran. The film starred Dylan McDermott, Nancy Travis, Quentin Tarantino, James LeGros and James Belushi. It marked the film debut role of David Cross, and was the first film produced by Rysher Entertainment.

== Plot ==
An incarcerated bank robber, Julian Goddard, escapes from prison. He is rescued in the desert by Johnny Destiny, a bizarre, possibly supernatural character. Destiny takes Julian to Las Vegas and the Marilyn Motel, owned by Harry Thoreau, who was Julian's partner in crime. Julian searches for his girlfriend, Lucille, and the proceeds of the heist.

However, Destiny has taken the money and Lucille is pregnant and shacking up with Tuerto, a mob kingpin. Her agent has convinced a record label to send a talent scout to hear her lounge singing act, but Julian's arrival upsets her plans. As they are hunted by both the police and Tuerto's henchmen, Destiny toys with their fate.

== Cast ==
- Dylan McDermott as Julian Goddard
- Nancy Travis as Lucille
- James LeGros as Harry Thoreau
- Quentin Tarantino as Johnny Destiny
- James Belushi as Tuerto
- Janet Carroll as Escabel
- David Cross as Ralph Dellaposa
- Richard Edson as Gage
- Bobcat Goldthwait as Mr. Smith
- Barry Shabaka Henley as Dravec
- Lisa Jane Persky as Katrina
- Sarah Trigger as Francine
- Tracey Walter as Pappy
- Allen Garfield as Vinnie Vidivici

== Reception ==
Roger Ebert of the Chicago Sun-Times gave the film 1 star out of 4 and wrote that it "moves at a lugubrious pace, is neither funny nor satirical, does not create any interest in its characters and takes seriously just those parts it should be laughing at - the Tarantino character, for example, or the business of how Lucille got pregnant in a dream. It's one of those movies where everybody must have spent a lot of time convincing themselves that the material would work if you looked at it in the right way, but nobody ever knew exactly what the right way was." Janet Maslin of The New York Times stated, "Thoroughly upstaged by the Las Vegas setting and by a studiously garish production design, the actors play out a satirically dark story laced with broad, dopey humor. If you don't think the idea of Bobcat Goldthwait in black socks is funny, you won't laugh at much else."

Todd McCarthy of Variety called the film "a hopeless and hapless attempt at cool. Apparently aiming at some sort of fable about winning and losing in American culture, filmmakers flail about trying to establish a tone that never materializes, and an array of good actors is left with nothing coherent to play." Gene Siskel of the Chicago Tribune awarded 1 star out of 4 and called the film "A major disappointment considering the presence of 'Pulp Fiction' director Quentin Tarantino as one of the co-stars of a road picture that leads to Las Vegas. Maybe it proves just what a tremendous achievement 'Pulp' was, because these riff-raff types are deadly dull." Lisa Schwarzbaum of Entertainment Weekly assigned a grade of D+ and wrote, "The visual cues that signify retro hipness — wraparound sunglasses, red convertibles, gaudy Las Vegas — take the place of true style in this self-satisfied riff on pulp-fiction themes." Peter Rainer of the Los Angeles Times called the film "a metaphysical snore fest that manages to strand an entire platoon of attractive performers in an oasis of pseudo-hip pseudo-cool."

On the review aggregator website Rotten Tomatoes, 16% of 19 critics' reviews are positive.

== Home video ==
The film was released on VHS and LaserDisc by HBO Home Video, but is out of print. It has not been released on DVD or Blu-ray, but it is available to rent or buy digitally from Paramount Pictures.
