= Confessions of a Go-Go Girl =

2008 television film

Confessions of a Go-Go Girl is a 2008 Lifetime made-for-television film starring Chelsea Hobbs, directed by Grant Harvey, based on a play by Jill Morley and written an co-executive produced by Lenore Kletter.

The film aired on Lifetime on August 16, 2008.

== Plot ==
Jane McCoy (Hobbs), a recent college graduate, decides to scrap her plans for law school to pursue an acting career full-time, against her parents' wishes. Struggling to make both ends meet, she meets a confident and persuasive friend (Carter) at her part-time sales job in a clothes store, who shows her the way to make extra money Go-go dancing. What starts as just an "easy money" job, however, rapidly becomes an all-consuming activity.

== Cast ==
- Chelsea Hobbs - Jane McCoy
- Sarah Carter - Angela Lucas
- Corbin Bernsen - Nick Harvey
- Rachel Hunter - Donna Mercer
- Travis Milne - Eric Baldwin
- Tygh Runyan - Kurt Powell
- Karen Kruper - Grace McCoy
- James D. Hopkin - Jim McCoy
- Graeme Black - Jamie 'Junior' Mccoy
- Judith Bucha - Anne Branson
- James Kot - Roy
- Stafford Lawrence - Ziggy
- Khari Jones - Yuppie Manager
- Shae Keebler - Elizabeth
- Terry David Mulligan - Dr. Double D
- Jennifer Rae Westley - Lily (as Jennifer Westley)
- Scott McAdam - Groom
- Rod Heatheringston - Best Man
- Shannon Micol - Young Woman

== Style ==
The Daily News's Michael Korb wrote, "Confessions is a little more risque than traditional Lifetime fare -- considering that Hobbs and friends are dancing around in their underwear for a significant portion of the film". Brad Newsome agreed, stating in The Sydney Morning Herald, "This is a little racier than the usual Hallmark fare." Robert Philpot said the film "continues [Lifetime's] August series of lurid-topic movies".

== Reception ==
Steve Pratt criticized the film in The Northern Echo, writing, "No full frontals in Confessions Of A Go-Go Girl [...] a 2008 TV movie of numbing boredom – even in fast forward mode."
