= Lovestruck: The Musical =

- Promotional advertisement
- Written by: Jaylynn Bailey; Terry Rossio
- Directed by: Sanaa Hamri
- Starring: Drew Seeley; Chelsea Kane; Sara Paxton; Tom Wopat; Jane Seymour
- Theme music composer: George S. Clinton
- Country of origin: United States
- Original language: English

Production
- Producers: Gaylyn Fraiche; Salli Newman
- Cinematography: Checco Varese
- Editor: Annette Davey
- Running time: 120 minutes

Original release
- Release: April 21, 2013

Lovestruck: The Musical is an American romance jukebox musical television film that premiered on April 21, 2013 on ABC Family. The film is directed by Sanaa Hamri and produced by Gaylyn Fraiche and Salli Newman. It stars Drew Seeley, Chelsea Kane, Sara Paxton, Jane Seymour and Tom Wopat.

== Plot ==
Harper Hutton was once a Broadway dance star until a leg injury cut her career short. While she has gone on to be a successful choreographer, Harper still wishes for the stardom denied to her. She has pushed her daughter Mirabella in her place, going so far as to produce an entire show around her. However, Mirabella tells her mother that she has fallen in love with Marco (a known play boy) and is flying to Italy to marry him. Convinced the man is up to no good and will ruin Mirabella's life, Harper prepares to follow Mirabella but when she drinks a "youth potion," she finds herself transformed into her 25-year-old self. Now using the alias of Debbie Hayworth, Harper befriends her daughter to ruin the wedding by trying to seduce her future son in law. When her ex-husband, Ryan, who has not spoken to her since the divorce, recognizes her, she uses the potion on him as well. While at the dinner rehearsal the night before the wedding, harper comes across a green house that is filled with Marco's unfinished wedding vows. As she realizes she may have misjudged Marco, she grabs all the letter to show her daughter before Mirabella confronts Marco of a so called brown eyed mistress (which was Harper). As her daughter's wishes for her life, Harper also finds herself with a second chance to rekindle a lost spark with her ex-husband after both talked about the real reason for his infidelity. Soon the wedding arrives and all is well with her daughter as they sing Everlasting Love.

== Cast ==
- Drew Seeley as Ryan Hutton / Angus
- Chelsea Kane as Harper Hutton / Debbie Hayworth
- Sara Paxton as Mirabella Hutton
- Tom Wopat as Ryan Hutton (at 55)
- Jane Seymour as Harper Hutton (at 55)
- Alexander DiPersia as Marco Vitturi
- Adrienne Bailon as Noelle
- Patrick Jordan as the Guard
- Sarab Kamoo as Amanda
- Zak Resnick as the DJ
- David Santiago as the Wedding Magistrate
- Mark Tallman as Scott

== Musical numbers ==
- "Just Dance" – Harper
- "I Wanna Dance with Somebody (Who Loves Me)" – Harper
- "Me Too (Stripped)" – Mirabella Hutton, Marco
- "Like a Virgin" – Mirabella, Noelle and Harper
- "How Can I Remember to Forget?" – Mirabella
- "DJ Got Us Fallin' in Love" – Ryan and Harper
- "Me Too (Main Mix)" – Mirabella, Marco
- "Everlasting Love" – Noelle, Mirabella, Marco and Cast
- "Here and Now" – Ryan

== Soundtrack ==
Lovestruck: The Musical (Music from the Original Television Movie)

Soundtrack album by Various artists
- Released: March 18, 2013
- Recorded: 2012
- Genre: Pop
- Length: 25:13
- Label: ABC Family

The official soundtrack album, Lovestruck: The Musical (Music from the Original Television Movie), was released digitally on March 18, 2013.

=== Track listing ===
| No. | Title | Performed by | Length |
|---|---|---|---|
| 1. | "Just Dance" | Lovestruck Cast | 2:35 |
| 2. | "I Wanna Dance With Somebody" | Lovestruck Cast | 3:20 |
| 3. | "Me Too (Stripped)" | Lovestruck Cast | 1:57 |
| 4. | "Like a Virgin" | Lovestruck Cast | 2:26 |
| 5. | "How Can I Remember To Forget" | Lovestruck Cast | 2:45 |
| 6. | "DJ Got Us Fallin In Love" | Lovestruck Cast | 3:36 |
| 7. | "Me Too (Main Mix)" | Lovestruck Cast | 2:14 |
| 8. | "Everlasting Love" | Lovestruck Cast | 2:55 |
| 9. | "Here and Now" | Drew Seeley | 2:55 |
