= Auggie Rose =

2001 film by Matthew Tabak

- DVD cover using the title Beyond Suspicion
- Directed by: Matthew Tabak
- Written by: Matthew Tabak
- Produced by: Matthew A. Rhodes; Dan Stone; Andrew Stevens
- Starring: Jeff Goldblum; Anne Heche; Timothy Olyphant
- Cinematography: Adam Kimmel
- Edited by: Brian Berdan
- Music by: Don Harper; Mark Mancina
- Production company: Franchise Pictures
- Distributed by: Roxie Releasing; 20th Century Fox Home Video
- Release dates: May 14, 2000 (Cannes Film Festival); March 18, 2001 (Cinemax)
- Running time: 109 minutes
- Country: United States
- Language: English

Auggie Rose, also known as Beyond Suspicion, is a 2000 American drama film directed by Matthew Tabak and starring Jeff Goldblum and Anne Heche. It was originally shown on Cinemax and then released on video with the title Beyond Suspicion before a limited theatrical release in San Francisco, Los Angeles and New York City.

== Plot ==
Life insurance salesman John Nolan (Jeff Goldblum) goes to the liquor store where he witnesses the fatal shooting of Auggie Rose (Kim Coates), an ex-convict on his second day as a stock boy. Auggie was returning from the back of the store with a bottle of wine John had requested – since the only bottle out front had a torn label – and he surprised the robber, who shot him in the stomach. John tries to comfort him, riding with him in the ambulance, but Auggie dies at the hospital.

Feeling responsible, and offended that the police show little interest in investigating and finding Auggie's next of kin, John finds out everything he can about Auggie, who was just released from prison after serving 20 years for armed robbery. Decker, the LAPD officer investigating the case (Richard T. Jones), warns him to back off. However, John becomes more and more engrossed with Auggie and disconnected from his own life, causing strain with his live-in girlfriend, Carol (Nancy Travis). After finding a stack of letters, he discovers that Auggie had a Southern pen pal named Lucy (Anne Heche) who is coming to meet him for the first time, unaware of Auggie's death, and is due to arrive the next day.

John tells his secretary, Noreen (Paige Moss), that he is taking a leave of absence. When John goes to meet Lucy, she greets him as Auggie, and he decides to pretend to be him. He lives in his apartment and starts a relationship with Lucy, and even applies for jobs as Auggie, getting a job as a stock boy at a small market. He meets ex-con Roy Mason (Timothy Olyphant), who knew Auggie through his cellmate but had never met him. Roy asks John to help him rob the L.A. Transit Authority, which he says has $200,000 in cash daily and only two guards. John says he will consider it.

John trades in his Volvo for a motorcycle to complete his look. He happily spends his days at the market and nights with Lucy. Unbeknownst to him, however, both Roy and Decker are suspicious and tailing him. Roy retrieves John's business card from his Volvo at the dealership. Roy goes to John's office and sees a photo of him on the wall. He confronts John in the lobby of Auggie's apartment, and says he began spying on him when he didn't eagerly accept the transit heist, and that he had asked around and learned Auggie was dead. He accuses John of killing him to take his identity, which John denies, and Roy says he thinks John must be working some kind of life insurance scam. Roy threatens to tell Lucy and John punches him. Roy says he even knows about Carol before he leaves. John later gives Roy a forged insurance policy in Auggie's name worth $100,000 with a blank beneficiary, and tells him to take it and go away.

John continues to have dreams and flashbacks to the shooting, including dreams in which he is in Auggie's place and gets shot after coming out with the bottle of wine. Lucy confesses to John that she married someone she didn't love after she started writing Auggie, but that the marriage had been annulled after four months after her husband found all of the letters to Auggie. She says she felt she had to tell him because he was so much more than she thought he would be. John decides to tell Lucy the truth. Devastated, she leaves.

John decides to officially end his life as John Nolan, selling his half of the business to his partner, Carl (Casey Biggs). As he leaves the office, he runs into his partner with a couple, whom he recognizes from the market. They ask his advice about the plan Carl recommended, and John tells the husband, "I think you should go home and make love to your wife and pray that nothing bad happens, and ask yourself each day, 'if it were to end right here right now, would it be enough?'" John even has a headstone put up for himself with the inscription "Free at last." He informs Decker about Roy's plan to rob the Transit Authority, and Roy is arrested for violating his parole while trying to cash the life insurance policy.

John goes back to work at the market. He is sent to the back to retrieve a bottle of wine and pauses, coming out cautiously. Instead of a gunman, he sees Lucy, who greets him with, "Hi, Auggie."

== Cast ==
- Jeff Goldblum as John C. Nolan Jr., a life insurance agent bored with his life
- Anne Heche as Lucy Brown, Auggie's prison pen pal
- Nancy Travis as Carol, John's live-in girlfriend
- Kim Coates as Auggie Rose, ex-con killed by an armed robber
- Timothy Olyphant as Roy Mason, ex-con looking to pull a heist with Auggie
- Richard T. Jones as Officer Decker, LAPD officer
- Paige Moss as Noreen, John's secretary
- Joe Santos as Emanuel, Auggie's neighbor

== Production ==
Originally William H. Macy was going to play John C. Nolan, but he dropped out because of scheduling conflicts and was replaced by Jeff Goldblum less than two weeks before shooting started. The film was shot on location in Los Angeles.

== Reception ==
Auggie Rose received mixed reviews from critics. It holds a 54% approval rating, based on 13 reviews, on review aggregator Rotten Tomatoes.

Writing for Variety, David Stratton wrote a negative review of the film upon its release at the 2000 Cannes Film Festival when it was searching for a distributor. Stratton wrote, "An attractive and intriguing premise is given disappointingly mundane treatment in Auggie Rose, which starts strongly but falters badly in the later going. Names of Jeff Goldblum and Anne Heche probably won't be enough to drag a significant amount of theatrical coin out of this one, but vidbin sales are more promising." However, another Variety reviewer, Dennis Harvey, gave a positive review a year later following the film's limited theatrical release. Harvey wrote that the film could have potential as a sleeper hit, praising Goldblum's performance in particular: "The most entertaining deer-caught-in-the-headlights eyes in showbiz are well deployed here, as Goldblum's customary air of distracted eccentricity lays bare protag's simultaneous bewilderment and pleasure at assuming another man's identity. It's a lovely, mercurial yet focused perf."

Kevin Thomas of the Los Angeles Times praised the film, in particular Goldblum and Heche, who he wrote "arguably give their best performances to date." Thomas wrote that Auggie Rose has "the earmarks of a sleeper: an unusual and involving premise persuasively and fully realized.... this modestly budgeted independent production deserves a chance to find a wider audience." Mick LaSalle of The San Francisco Chronicle wrote that director Tabak made good use of Goldblum's talent, writing, "Auggie Rose is one of those go-out-for-coffee-afterward-and-talk-about-it movies, and those are always welcome. It's about identity and existential angst and stars that master of psychic dislocation, Jeff Goldblum. In Hollywood films, Goldblum gets to act smirky and amusing. Yet his delivery of lines has often implied a psychological complexity that few filmmakers have bothered to tap. Goldblum always seems to be listening to and weighing his own thoughts ... and then saying them in a rush, lest he think something else and disagree with himself before he's finished. He is exactly the actor to cast in a role calling for uncertainty and confusion. Writer-director Matthew Tabak had the insight to see Goldblum in this way."

Elvis Mitchell of The New York Times gave a negative review, writing, "Despite the potential of the material, there is little action to accompany it. In fact, there's so little going on in Auggie Rose that the movie begins to feel like a coffeehouse conversation about a movie that's all about meanings and motif rather than substance and characters."
