= Chaplin: His Life and Art =

Biography of Charlie Chaplin by David Robinson

- Author: David Robinson
- Language: English
- Published: January 1985
- Publisher: McGraw Hill
- Pages: 792
- ISBN: 9780070531819

Chaplin: His Life and Art is a 1985 book (revised second edition 2001) by film critic David Robinson which examines the life and works of Sir Charlie Chaplin. Along with Chaplin's 1964 book My Autobiography, it was used as source material for the 1992 film Chaplin. The idea for the book originated with Chaplin's long-time collaborator and producer Jerome Epstein.

== Reviews ==
The British Film Institute described the book as Chaplin's "definitive biography ... impeccably researched, well written and full of detail."

== First edition ==
- McGraw-Hill, 1985, ISBN 0-07-053181-1
