= Blue Eyed Butcher =

2012 television film directed by Stephen Kay

- Written by: Michael J. Murray
- Directed by: Stephen Kay
- Starring: Sara Paxton; Justin Bruening; Lisa Edelstein
- Theme music composer: Brad Hamilton
- Country of origin: United States
- Original language: English

Production
- Producer: Kyle Clark
- Editor: Hunter M. Via
- Running time: 96 minutes

Original release
- Network: Lifetime
- Release: March 3, 2012

Blue Eyed Butcher is a 2012 American crime drama thriller television film directed by Stephen Kay. It stars Sara Paxton, Justin Bruening and Lisa Edelstein. The film is based on the 2003 stabbing death of Jeff Wright by the hands of his wife, Susan Wright, but focuses on Kelly Siegler, the case's prosecutor. The film made its debut on March 3, 2012, on Lifetime. It later aired in France on the TF1 channel under the title 193 coups de folie.

== Cast ==
- Sara Paxton as Susan Wright
- Justin Bruening as Jeff Wright
- Lisa Edelstein as Kelly Siegler
- Michael Gross as Ron Wright
- W. Earl Brown as Thomas Dean
- Vyto Ruginis as Philip Gross
- McKinley Freeman as Constable
