= Nancy Travis =

American actress (born 1961)

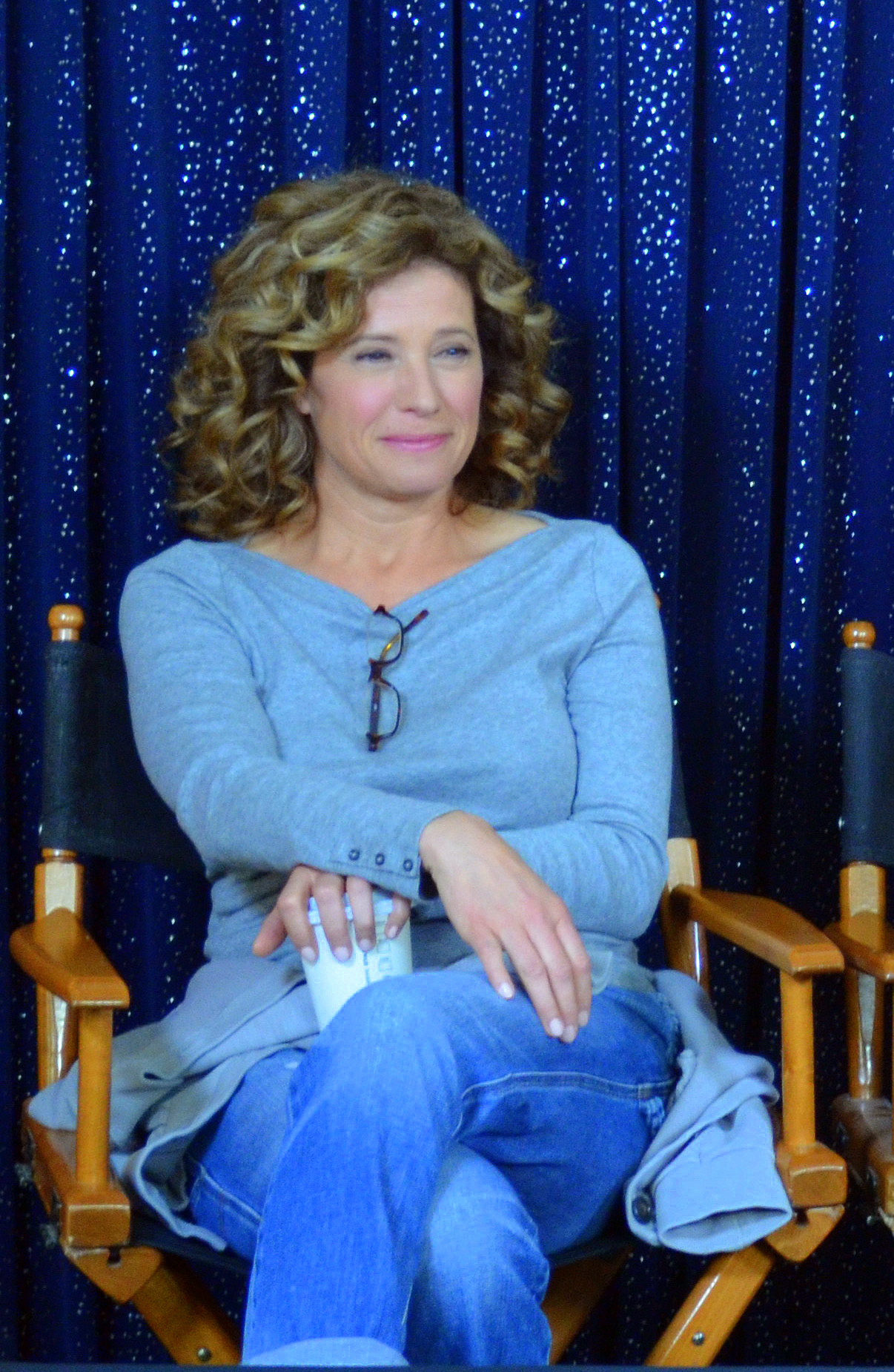
- Travis in 2012
- Born: September 21, 1961 (age 65); New York City, U.S.
- Education: New York University (BA)
- Occupations: Actress; producer
- Years active: 1985–present
- Known for: Chris Connor - Becker; Vanessa Baxter - Last Man Standing
- Spouse: Robert N. Fried (m. 1994)
- Children: 2

Nancy Travis (born September 21, 1961) is an American actress. She began her career on Off-Broadway theater, before her first leading screen role in the ABC television miniseries Harem opposite Omar Sharif. Her breakthrough came in 1987, playing Sylvia Bennington in the comedy film Three Men and a Baby. She later starred in its sequel, Three Men and a Little Lady (1990).

Travis has starred in many films, including Internal Affairs (1990), Air America (1990), Passed Away (1992), Chaplin (1992), So I Married an Axe Murderer (1993), Greedy (1994), and Fluke (1995). On television, Travis went on to star in the CBS sitcom Almost Perfect in 1995, which ran two seasons, and in the short-lived Work with Me (1999). In 2002, she played a leading role in the ABC miniseries Rose Red, and later joined the cast of the CBS sitcom Becker for its final two seasons.

From 2011 to 2021, Travis starred as Vanessa Baxter in the ABC/Fox sitcom Last Man Standing. From 2018 to 2019, she also starred opposite Michael Douglas in the Netflix comedy series The Kominsky Method. In 2023, Travis starred in the Hallmark Channel neo-Western drama series Ride. She also has a recurring role on NCIS as Vice Admiral Harriet Parker, sister of series regular Alden Parker (Gary Cole).

== Early life ==
Travis was born in Queens, the daughter of Theresa, a social worker, and Gordon Travis, a sales executive. Travis was raised in Framingham, Massachusetts, and Baltimore, Maryland. She was raised Roman Catholic. She graduated with a Bachelor of Arts from New York University.

== Career ==
Travis's first job after graduating from high school was in a play, It's Hard to Be a Jew, at The American Jewish Theatre in NYC. She also acted in commercials, notably for Twinkies and Levi's Jeans. After that, Travis appeared in a stage version of Neil Simon's Brighton Beach Memoirs and was a founding member of the Off-Broadway theater company Naked Angels. She appeared in their Frank Pugliese play Aven U-Boys, as well as in King of Connecticut. She made her Broadway debut in I'm Not Rappaport in 1985. She starred in Athol Fugard's My Children, My Africa. In 1985, Travis made her screen debut playing a supporting role in the made-for-television biographical film Malice in Wonderland starring Elizabeth Taylor. The following year she received a star-billing role in the two-part ABC miniseries, Harem opposite Omar Sharif. She later made guest-starring appearances in television series Spenser: For Hire and Tales from the Darkside.

In 1987, Travis made her big screen debut playing Sylvia Bennington in the comedy film Three Men and a Baby starring Tom Selleck, Steve Guttenberg, and Ted Danson. The film was one of the biggest American box office hits of 1987 grossing $240 million worldwide. She reprised her role in its sequel, Three Men and a Little Lady in 1990. In 1988, Travis had supporting roles in two films: crime comedy Married to the Mob, and the sports drama Eight Men Out. She starred opposite Hal Holbrook and Eva Marie Saint in the made-for-television Christmas drama film I'll Be Home for Christmas later in 1988.

In 1990, Travis starred in four films: she starred as the female lead and wife of Andy García's character in the crime thriller Internal Affairs, the action comedy and box-office bomb Loose Cannons, starred alongside Mel Gibson and Robert Downey Jr. in the action comedy Air America and Three Men and a Little Lady.

In 1992 she starred opposite Bob Hoskins in the comedy film Passed Away and was featured in the biographical film Chaplin opposite Robert Downey Jr., portraying Joan Barry, the woman who filed a paternity suit against Chaplin. The following year, Travis starred alongside Jeff Bridges and Kiefer Sutherland in the psychological thriller The Vanishing, and starred in the romantic comedy-drama So I Married an Axe Murderer as the bride of Mike Myers' character. Travis also starred with Peter Gallagher and Isabella Rossellini in the Tom Cruise-directed episode of the Showtime neo-noir anthology series Fallen Angels in 1993. Travis starred alongside Michael J. Fox in the comedy film Greedy in 1994. The following year she went to star in the box office bomb fantasy drama film Fluke, the action-comedy Destiny Turns on the Radio with Dylan McDermott, and the HBO crime thriller Body Language opposite Tom Berenger. In 1996, Travis appeared in Whoopi Goldberg's comedy film, Bogus.

In 1995, Travis moved to television with the leading role as a female executive producer of a television cop show, in the CBS sitcom Almost Perfect. The show was canceled after two seasons. She did voice-over work in the animated series Duckman from 1994 to 1997. She starred in an episode of Robert Altman's anthology series, Gun in 1997, and went to star and produce Lifetime romantic drama film, My Last Love (1999). In 1999, Travis also produced and starred and in the short-lived CBS sitcom Work with Me. Due to low ratings, the show was cancelled after four episodes. The following year she returned to cinema playing supporting role in the drama film Auggie Rose. She also starred in the political comedy-drama film Running Mates with Three Men and a Baby co-star Tom Selleck.

In 2002, Travis had the leading role of psychology professor Dr. Joyce Reardon in the four-hour television adaptation of Stephen King's Rose Red. In 2002, Travis joined the cast of the CBS sitcom Becker as Chris Connor. She starred in the show for its final two seasons, replacing the series' original female lead, Terry Farrell. She appeared in the 2005 comedy-drama film The Sisterhood of the Traveling Pants and the 2007 ensemble romantic drama The Jane Austen Book Club adapted from the 2004 novel of the same name by Karen Joy Fowler. She also appeared in the 2007 made-for-television film The Party Never Stops: Diary of a Binge Drinker. From 2007 to 2009, Travis starred in the TBS sitcom The Bill Engvall Show as Bill's wife Susan. In 2009 she starred in the Hallmark Channel film Safe Harbor, about a happily married couple, Doug (Treat Williams) and Robbie Smith (Travis) about to retire and spend their days cruising the world on their sailboat. In 2010, she starred in the television films The Pregnancy Pact, In My Shoes and was a guest star in two episodes of Desperate Housewives. In 2011, she guest starred in the television series Grey's Anatomy and How I Met Your Mother.

In 2011, Travis was cast in the ABC sitcom Last Man Standing opposite Tim Allen. Travis also was cast in the same time in The CW medical drama series Hart of Dixie as Emmeline "Mrs. H" Hattenbarger, but due to her commitments with the 20th Century Fox-produced Last Man Standing left the show after two episodes. Last Man Standing was canceled in 2017, after six seasons and 130 episodes, but was revived by Fox in the fall of 2018. The show debuted on September 28, 2018, and had its highest rating since season two. The series ended in 2021 after 194 episodes.

From 2017 to 2018, Travis played Brendan Gleeson's ex-wife in the crime thriller series Mr. Mercedes. In 2018, Travis was cast as a female lead opposite Michael Douglas and Alan Arkin in the Netflix comedy series The Kominsky Method, created by Chuck Lorre.

In 2022, she returned to film, starring opposite Hilary Swank in the drama Ordinary Angels directed by Jon Gunn. She next was cast in the Hallmark Channel Neo-Western drama series Ride playing the role of Isabel McMurray, the family matriarch. The series was canceled after one season later that year.

In 2026, Travis portrayed Connie Van Oosten in the Lifetime film Rescued by Faith: The Connie and Larry Van Oosten Story which detailed their kidnapping and ransom at the hands of Chad Schipper.

== Personal life ==
In 1994, Travis married Robert N. Fried, a producer of So I Married An Axe Murderer (1993) in which she appeared. Fried is the former president and CEO of Savoy Pictures, founder and former CEO of Hallmark+ (formerly known as SpiritClips and Feeln), and the CEO of Niagen Bioscience. They have two sons. Travis starred in the 2007 short film Sally, featuring one of her sons and written by her husband.

== Filmography ==
=== Film ===
Year	Title	Role	Notes
1986	Harem	Jessica Gray	
1987	Three Men and a Baby	Sylvia Bennington	
1988	Married to the Mob	Karen Lutnick	
1988	Eight Men Out	Lyria Williams	
1988	I'll Be Home for Christmas	Leah Bundy	
1989	How Much Is Really True?		Short film
1990	Loose Cannons	Riva	
1990	Internal Affairs	Kathleen "Kathy" Avilla	
1990	Air America	Corinne Landreaux	
1990	Three Men and a Little Lady	Sylvia Bennington	
1992	Passed Away	Cassie Slocombe	
1992	Chaplin	Joan Barry	
1993	The Vanishing	Rita Baker	
1993	So I Married an Axe Murderer	Harriet Michaels	
1994	Greedy	Robin	
1995	Fluke	Carol Johnson	
1995	Lieberman in Love	Kate	Short film
1995	Destiny Turns on the Radio	Lucille	
1995	Body Language	Atty. Theresa Janice 'T.J.' Harlow	
1996	Bogus	Lorraine Franklin	
1999	My Last Love	Susan Morton	Also producer
2000	Beyond Suspicion	Carol	
2005	The Sisterhood of the Traveling Pants	Lydia Rodman	
2007	The Jane Austen Book Club	Cat Harris	
2007	Sally	Sally	Short film
2014	Squatters	Carol	
2014	Dissonance	Bobbi	Short film
2015	The Submarine Kid	Mrs. Koll	
2017	Bernard and Huey	Mona	
2018	Married Young	Rachel	
2021	Night of the Animated Dead	Helen Cooper	Voice
2024	Ordinary Angels	Barbara Schmitt	
2025	Sovereign	Patty Bouchart	

=== Television ===
Year	Title	Role	Notes
1985	Malice in Wonderland	Ann	Television film
1986	Harem	Jessica Gray	Television film
1986	Spenser: For Hire	Maggie Ellis	Episode: "The Hopes and Fears"
1993	Fallen Angels	Bette Allison	Episode: "The Frightening Frammis"
1994-1997	Duckman	Bernice / Beverly / Beatrice / Grandma-ma	Voice, main role
1995-1997	Almost Perfect	Kim Cooper	Main role
1996	The Real Adventures of Jonny Quest	Spencer	Voice, episode: "Rage's Burning Wheel"
1998	Superman: The Animated Series	Darci Mason	Voice, episode: "Obsession"
1999	Work with Me	Julie Better	Main role, also producer
2000	Running Mates	Jennifer "Jenny" Pryce	Television film
2000	The Wild Thornberrys	Cat	Voice, episode: "Queen of Denial"
2002	Stephen King's Rose Red	Prof. Joyce Reardon	Miniseries
2002-2004	Becker	Christine "Chris" Connor	Main role
2007-2009	The Bill Engvall Show	Susan Pearson	Main role
2007	The Party Never Stops: Diary of a Binge Drinker	April Brenner	Television film
2008	Medium	Laura Swenson	Episode: "Do You Hear What I Hear?"
2009	Numb3rs	Dr. Jane Karellen	Episode: "First Law"
2009	Safe Harbor	Robbie	Television film
2010	The Pregnancy Pact	Lorraine Dougan	Television film
2010	A Walk In My Shoes	Cindy/Trish	Television film
2010	Desperate Housewives	Dr. Mary Wagner	2 episodes
2011	Grey's Anatomy	Alison	Episode: "Not Responsible"
2011	How I Met Your Mother	Cheryl Whittaker	Episode: "Legendaddy"
2011	Hart of Dixie	Emmeline Hattenbarger (Mrs. H)	2 episodes
2011–2021	Last Man Standing	Vanessa Baxter	Main role
2017–2018	Mr. Mercedes	Donna Hodges	Recurring role
2018	The Ranch	Karen	Episode: "Telling Me Lies"
2018–2019	The Kominsky Method	Lisa	Main role
2023	Ride	Isabelle "Mama" McMurray	Main role
2023	Law & Order: Special Victims Unit	Winifred "Winnie" Humphreys	Episode: "King of the Moon"
2025	Shifting Gears	Charlotte	Season 1, episode 6: "Valentine's" and season 2, episode one: "Secret"
2025-2026	NCIS	Vice Admiral Harriet Parker	Season 23, episodes: "Prodigal Son (Part 1)", "Prodigal Son (Part 2)", and "Deal with the Devil"
2026	Rescued by Faith: The Connie and Larry Van Oosten Story	Connie Van Oosten	Television film
