= Beach Girls (American TV series) =

- Genre: Drama
- Based on: Beach Girls by Luanne Rice
- Directed by: Paul Shapiro; Sandy Smolan; Jeff Woolnough
- Starring: Rob Lowe; Chelsea Hobbs; Julia Ormond
- Country of origin: United States
- Original language: English
- No. of episodes: 6

Production
- Executive producers: Robert Greenwald; Alys Shanti
- Production companies: Robert Greenwald Productions; Fox Television Studios

Original release
- Network: Lifetime
- Release: July 31 – August 28, 2005

Beach Girls was a six-part 2005 American miniseries produced by Fox Television Studios and Robert Greenwald Productions and broadcast by Lifetime. The teleplay by Edithe Swensen, Elle Triedman and Eric Tuchman was based on the 2004 bestselling novel by Luanne Rice.

The Beach Girls were three teenagers who spent their summers in the small, quiet beach town of Hubbard's Point. The trio grew apart and eventually went their separate ways, but the death of one of them reunites the surviving two, Stevie and Maddie, when her widower Jack and daughter Nell arrive in town.

Paul Shapiro, Sandy Smolan, and Jeff Woolnough shared directing credits. The cast included Rob Lowe as Jack, Chelsea Hobbs as Nell, Julia Ormond as Stevie and Katherine Ashby as Maddie, with Chris Carmack and Cloris Leachman in featured roles.

The opening credits theme song was "Dreams," written by Dolores O'Riordan and Noel Hogan and performed by The Cranberries.

The series was filmed in Chester, Crystal Crescent Beach, and Halifax, all located in Nova Scotia, Canada. It aired in France and Sweden in 2006, Australia in 2007 and New Zealand in 2010. It has been released on DVD by Warner Home Video.

== Cast ==
- Rob Lowe as Jack
- Chelsea Hobbs as Nell
- Chris Carmack as Cooper
- Katherine Ashby as Maddie
- Julia Ormond as Stevie
- Cloris Leachman as Aunt Aida
