= Bristol Silents =

Bristol Silents was established by Chris Daniels and Norman Taylor in 2000 to promote and celebrate silent cinema in the Bristol area and in the United Kingdom. The first ever event the organisation put on was a selection of Louise Brooks films in October 2000 at the Arnolfini, Bristol.

The group aimed to present a range of silent films along with educational programmes in order to raise awareness and appreciation of the Silent era amongst the film going public.

January, 2005 saw Bristol Silents establish the Slapstick Festival in the city of Bristol. Since then, the festival has returned to the city every January and has included guests such as Eric Sykes, Christopher Chaplin, Jean Darling (of Our Gang fame) and Diana Serra Cary (a.k.a. Baby Peggy).

== Supporters ==
Regular supporters of Bristol Silents have included: Kevin Brownlow (Film Historian and Author), Paul McGann (Actor), David Robinson (Film Historian and Author), Peter Lord (Aardman Animations), Chris Serle (Broadcaster), David Sproxton (Aardman Animations) and Richard Williams (Animator).

== See also ==
- Culture in Bristol
