= Guy Turcotte killings =

Canadian convicted murderer and former cardiologist

Guy Turcotte (born April 21, 1972) is a Canadian convicted murderer and former cardiologist. On February 21, 2009, Turcotte murdered his two children in Piedmont, Quebec, Canada, by stabbing his five-year-old son 27 times and his three-year-old daughter 19 times as they slept in their bedrooms.

== Background ==
Guy Turcotte, born April 21, 1972, worked with his wife, Isabelle Gaston, at Hôtel-Dieu de Saint-Jérôme, a hospital in Saint-Jérôme, Quebec. Gaston worked as an emergency-room physician and a coroner. He met and began a relationship with Gaston in Québec City in 1999. They moved in together in 2000, but their relationship became hostile to the point of domestic violence from both parties. That violence led Turcotte to move out, but he reconciled with Gaston shortly after promising to work on their relationship. Following their reconciliation, Turcotte proposed to Gaston while visiting Mount Washington in New Hampshire; Gaston accepted his proposal. Gilles Turcotte, Guy Turcotte’s brother, said he "was attentive to his children and nieces and nephews.... When Guy is playing with the children, we can see he is having as much fun as them...."

In mid-January 2009, shortly before Gaston and Turcotte were planning to leave for a trip to Mexico with their children, Turcotte learned that his wife was having an affair with their personal trainer and friend, Martin Huot. Huot's girlfriend, Patricia Giroux, informed Turcotte of the affair and also provided proof by showing emails between Huot and Gaston. That angered Turcotte, who felt betrayed. He did not cancel the trip, but Turcotte and Gaston decided to separate. Two days after coming home from their trip, Turcotte left the family residence. Gaston and the children stayed in the house, and both parents agreed to share custody.

During the separation, conversations between Turcotte and Gaston were often spiteful. On February 8, 2009, Turcotte found out that "the children had been to the Carnaval de Québec with their mother and Huot. The Carnaval reportedly had special meaning to him since he had lived in Quebec City for many years." Turcotte testified that "[a] hammer to the head would have hurt less.... I could not accept that Martin spent time with my children... as if I was being replaced". The next day, a former neighbour told Turcotte that the day he left, Huot had spent the night with his family and had been staying there almost every night for the previous two weeks. Turcotte said during his testimony that the information "made him flip". On February 10, 2009, he went to his family's residence to fetch his son's sweater and found Huot in the kitchen. Turcotte said, "You stole my wife. You betrayed me, you were my friend" and punched Huot in the face before leaving the house.

On February 20, 2009, Turcotte drove by his old house, and Gaston ordered him to leave, telling him, "you are going to stop controlling my life... now, if I want to, I can change the children's names... I can get custody, I can move anywhere in Quebec." Turcotte was terrified of losing his children. That day, while he was at work, colleagues noted "no outward signs" of distress. He had exchanged emails with Gaston and also picked up his children from daycare and school. He telephoned Gaston, who told him that she had changed the locks on the house and had consulted a lawyer. He was deeply hurt and took this as an "attack." He replied that if she wanted war, she was going to get it. That night, Turcotte felt dejected and began to cry. After putting the children to bed, he read dated emails from Gaston which further hurt and disheartened him. He wanted to end his life and searched the Internet for techniques to commit suicide.

== The murders ==
"On the morning of February 21, 2009, two police officers followed up on a call placed to 911 after the respondent had expressed suicidal thoughts to his mother. When they entered the respondent's home, the officers discovered the inert bodies of two children, a boy and a girl." "Turcotte was under his bed, covered in vomit and blood. He told police he'd drunk windshield wiper fluid and wanted to die".

In his testimony Turcotte recalled disordered scenes of the event: "He is standing in his son's room. He has a knife in his hands and stabs his son. His son cries out "no" and moves away. He realizes that he is hurting him. He panics and stabs him more'. He has a similar memory with respect to his daughter. He sees himself in the bathroom. He drinks windshield washer fluid. He has blood on his hands. He has hurt his children and looks for the knife to stab himself in the heart', but cannot find it".

== First trial ==
Turcotte portrayed himself and Gaston as professionals dealing with the stress of raising children and dealing with life. He was charged with two counts of first-degree murder for the deaths of his two children. The trial began on April 12, 2011, and on July 5, the jury rendered a verdict of not criminally responsible due to mental disorder (adjustment disorder with anxiety and depressive moods).

The prosecution successfully appealed the verdict on grounds that the trial judge, the Honourable Mr. Justice Marc David, of the Superior Court, District of Terrebonne, had erred in law, mainly with respect to the issue of self-induced methanol intoxication in conjunction with a mental disorder.

== Psychiatric treatment and second trial ==
In 2012, Turcotte said that he was better than he was before the brutal stabbings in February 2009; he felt less shame, less guilt, had more self-esteem, and was ready to be released. Testifying before a mental health review board to determine whether to keep Turcotte another year at the Institut Philippe-Pinel de Montréal or release him to the care of his family, Turcotte said he was not a danger to anyone. Turcotte's lawyer, Pierre Poupart, announced in 2014 that he wanted to go to the Supreme Court of Canada in an attempt to challenge the appeals court ruling. Quebec Superior Court Justice Marc David, who presided over the first trial, postponed the date-setting until April 4, 2014 and said any new trial would not take place before March 2015. After spending 46 months in psychiatric care before being deemed fit for release from a mental institution, Turcotte remained behind bars awaiting trial. On September 12, 2014, he was released on a $100,000 bail, and a new trial was scheduled for September 2015.

In December 2015, Turcotte was found guilty of second-degree murder of his two children. On January 15, 2016, he was sentenced to life in prison, with 17 years before he can be eligible for parole.

== In popular culture ==
In 2014, Canadian director Chloë Bellande released a seventeen-minute short-film entitled Will of Fortune, which was inspired by the murder trials of Turcotte and a woman, Susan Wright, who had stabbed her husband nearly 200 times and buried his body in their back yard in Houston, Texas. The film premiered at the Cannes Film Festival in May 2014.

Montreal rapper Enima was violent toward Pamela Thomas and threatened to kill both her and their son. In 2023, while on the run, in Spain, he made an allusion to his ex and crying son, stating, “Je vais faire un Guy Turcotte de moi-même si quelqu’un bouge”—a disturbing reference to Guy Turcotte. This statement implied a threat of extreme violence, causing serious concern.
