= Snow Queen (film) =

- Official DVD cover
- Based on: The Snow Queen by Hans Christian Andersen
- Teleplay by: Simon Moore
- Story by: Hans Christian Andersen
- Directed by: David Wu
- Starring: Bridget Fonda; Chelsea Hobbs; Jeremy Guilbaut
- Music by: Lawrence Shragge
- Countries of origin: United States; Germany; Canada
- Original language: English

Production
- Producers: Matthew O'Connor; Michael O'Connor; Pascal Verschooris
- Cinematography: Gregory Middleton
- Editors: Yelena Lanskaya; David Wu
- Running time: 180 minutes
- Production company: Hallmark Entertainment

Original release
- Network: Hallmark Channel
- Release: December 7, 2002

Snow Queen is a 2002 made-for-television film produced by Hallmark Entertainment and directed by David Wu based on the 1844 story The Snow Queen by Hans Christian Andersen. Also known as The Winter Witch, the film stars Bridget Fonda as the title character and Chelsea Hobbs as her rival and the story's heroine, Gerda. The film originally aired on Hallmark Channel as a two-part miniseries, but has since been released as a full-length film on DVD in the United States. The DVD was released in the United Kingdom on November 9, 2009 and in Australia on September 2, 2011. This was Bridget Fonda's last acting role before her retirement.

The Polar Bear suit used and was created by Jim Henson's Creature Shop.

== Plot ==
Gerda lives in a remote hotel in the far North with her father, her only real companion being the hotel's new bellboy, Kai. A mysterious woman comes to stay at the hotel, dressed in white fur and diamonds and accompanied by wolves. She is the Snow Queen and in the middle of the night she disappears, taking Kai away with her to her distant palace, where he is tasked to put together a large broken mirror, while guarded by a polar bear. Gerda sets off to rescue Kai, having to journey through Spring, Summer and Autumn, in order to finally reach the Winter domain of the Snow Queen.

== Cast ==
- Bridget Fonda as Snow Queen
- Chelsea Hobbs as Gerda
- Jeremy Guilbaut as Kai
- Robert Wisden as Wolfgang
- Wanda Cannon as Minna
- Meghan Black as Robber Girl
- Jennifer Clement as Spring Witch
- Kira Clavell as Summer Princess
- Suzy Joachim as Autumn Robber
- Duncan Fraser as Mayor
- Rachel Hayward as Amy
- Jessie Borgstrom as 8-year-old Gerda
- Robert D. Jones as Priest
- Alexander Hoy as Chen
- Trever Havixbeck as Sergeant at Arms
- John DeSantis as Satan
- Jim Byrnes as Polar bear (voice)

== Production details ==
- The town scenes were shot in Fort Steele, British Columbia, a heritage town in British Columbia, Canada
- The interior of the White Bear Hotel was a set built on a sound stage, the same set being covered in synthetic snow for later scenes

== Awards ==
Saturn Award (2003)

- Best Single Television Presentation - Nominated

Canadian Society of Cinematographers Awards (2003)

- Best Cinematography in TV Drama - Won

Leo Awards (2003)

- Best Female Lead Performance in a Feature Length Drama (Chelsea Hobbs) - Nominated
- Best Overall Sound in a Feature Length Drama - Nominated
