= My Last Love =

- Written by: Katie Ford
- Directed by: Michael Schultz
- Starring: Nancy Travis
- Country of origin: United States
- Original language: English

Original release
- Network: Lifetime
- Release: January 25, 1999

My Last Love (To Live For in UK) is a 1999 American romantic drama television film written by Katie Ford and directed by Michael Schultz. It stars Nancy Travis as a single mother who had been diagnosed with cancer. It premiered on Lifetime Television on January 25, 1999.

== Plot ==
A dying woman moves to California where she meets a younger man and makes arrangements for her daughter's future.

== Cast ==
- Nancy Travis as Susan Morton
- Scott Bairstow as Michael Blake
- Jamie Renee Smith as Carson Morton
- James Karen as Phil Morton
- Holland Taylor as Marnie Morton
- Viveka Davis as Kate
- Mary-Pat Green as Nurse Janet
- Janet MacLachlan as Dr. Francis
