= Safe Harbor (film) =

2009 television film

- Written by: Josef Anderson
- Directed by: Jerry Jameson
- Starring: Nancy Travis; Treat Williams
- Country of origin: United States
- Original language: English

Production
- Producers: Dan Paulson; Norton Wright
- Running time: 85 minutes

Original release
- Network: Hallmark Channel
- Release: May 30, 2009

Safe Harbor is a 2009 television film, based on a true story starring Treat Williams and Nancy Travis. The film was first shown on Hallmark Channel on May 30, 2009.

== History ==
The movie is based on the beginnings of the Safe Harbor Boys Home, a residential educational program for at risk teenaged boys on the Saint Johns River in Jacksonville, Florida, founded by Doug and Robbie Smith. The program teaches troubled teens the maritime skills of navigation and voyaging both under sail and under power, along with valuable vocational skills such as engine repair, electrical work and welding, combined with a strong academic program.

The program's combination of academic and vocational education, teamed with the structure, discipline and love they receive, has resulted in a 95% success rate with the boys served by the program.

The screenwriter Josef Anderson and executive producer Norton Wright spent hours interviewing the Smiths.

== Plot ==
Doug and Robbie Smith are a happily married, childless couple about to retire and spend their days cruising around the world on their sailboat. But before they have the chance to leave, their good friend, Judge David Roberts, asks them to care for two teenage boys he sentenced to juvenile hall. The facility is currently full and the judge tells the couple that, instead of being sent to county jail, the boys can help them prepare their boat for sailing day. The Smiths agree and soon take on two more boys with similar circumstances.

The Smiths are soon faced with a variety of challenges from the boys, their surly attitude and a fire on the boat. Ultimately, Doug and Robbie see positive changes in the four young men, who are now reluctant to leave their new "family". Doug and Robbie also see changes in themselves as they rethink their sailing trip, their decision not to have children, and what their future now holds.

== Cast ==
- Treat Williams as Doug
- Nancy Travis as Robbie
- Orson Bean as Jack Roberts
- Reiley McClendon as Luke
- Charlie McDermott as David Porter
- Cameron Monaghan as Larry Parker
- Sam Jones III as Billy
- Maitland McConnell as Charlotte
- Jimmy Ortega as Sheriff

== Reception ==
Safe Harbor did moderately for Hallmark Channel at its premiere. The film was ranked among the top five for household and key demographics. It also ranked as the second highest-rated ad-supported cable movie of the day and fourth highest-rated of the week, delivering a 1.8 household rating with 1.5 million homes, over 2 million total viewers and 3.2 million unduplicated viewers.

Reviews were moderately positive. The New York Daily News called it an expected delivery of "decent people, solid values, [and] a general sense that there's more good than bad in the world." It also called it "heartwarming".

Laura Fries from Variety wrote

Safe Harbor is exactly what it purports to be -- a haven of feel-good sentiments amid an onslaught of real-world bad news. A sound vehicle whose solid cast and based-on-real-life morality keep it afloat, this Hallmark Channel movie ultimately works, even if the characterizations don't always hold water.

She also states that "obstacles and resistance are too easily overcome" and that there are deep characterizations of "good" and "bad" people, but that the talent of the cast makes it almost believable.
