= Sara Paxton =

American actress (born 1988)

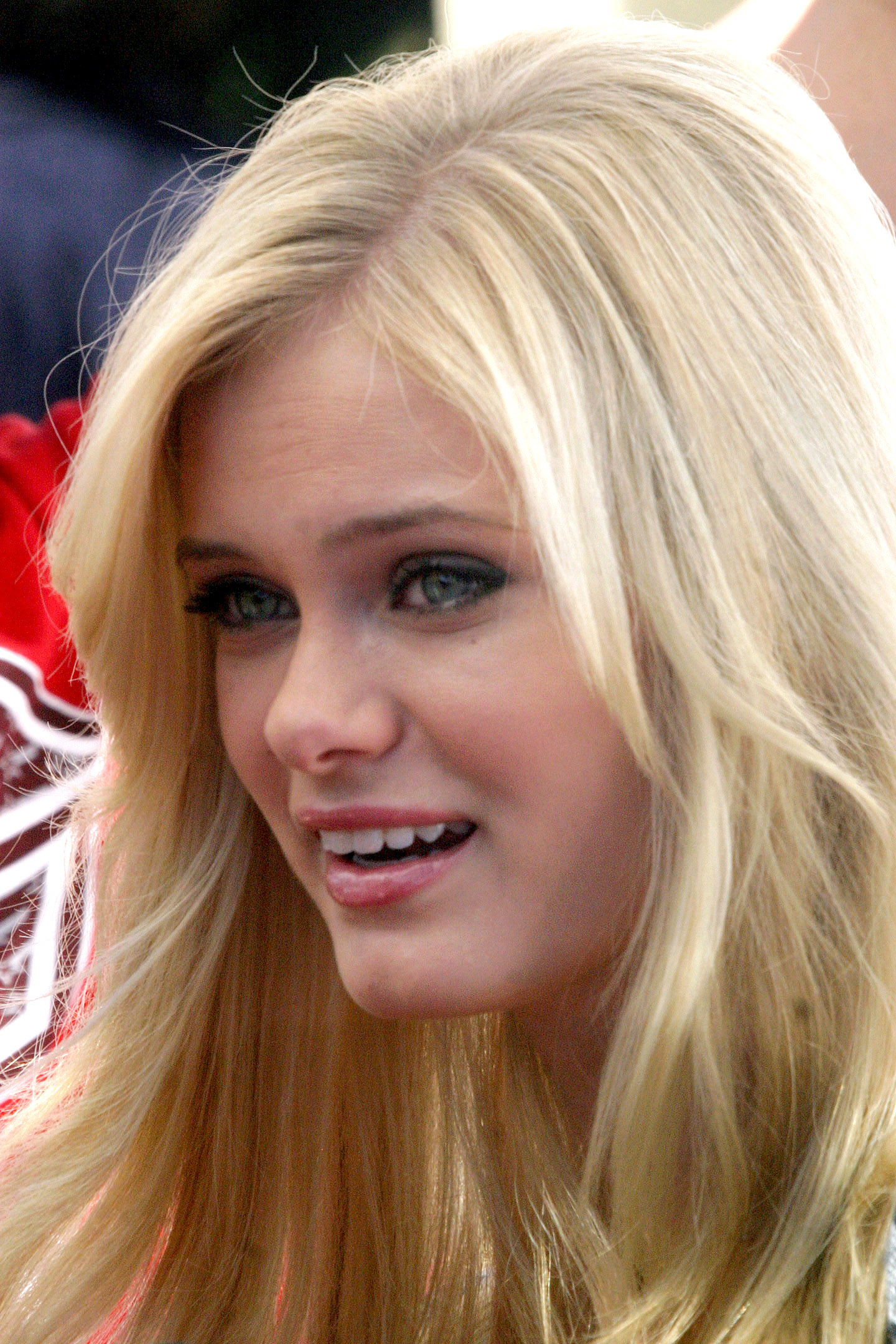
- Paxton in 2007
- Born: April 25, 1988 (age 38); Los Angeles, California, U.S.
- Occupation: Actress
- Years active: 1996–present
- Spouse: Zach Cregger (m. 2019)

Sara Paxton (born April 25, 1988) is an American actress. She began acting at an early age, appearing in minor roles in both films and television shows before rising to fame in the 2000s. On television, she played Sarah Tobin in Greetings from Tucson (2002–2003), the titular role in the television series Darcy's Wild Life (2004–2006) and Sarah Borden in Summerland (2004). Her other films include Aquamarine (2006), Return to Halloweentown (2006), Sydney White (2007), Superhero Movie (2008), The Last House on the Left (2009), The Innkeepers (2011), and The Front Runner (2018).

== Early life ==
Sara Paxton was born on April 25, 1988, in Woodland Hills, Los Angeles. She is the only child of Lucia (née Menchaca) and Steve Paxton, both of whom are dentists. Her mother is Mexican of Jewish descent. Paxton's father is of English and Scottish descent, and he converted to Judaism upon marrying her mother. Paxton did not have a bat mitzvah because of her filming schedule.

She was raised in the San Fernando Valley and graduated from El Camino Real High School in June 2006. In a 2009 interview with Teen Hollywood, Paxton disclosed that she had been accepted to several colleges, but decided not to attend any schools in favor of pursuing her acting career.

== Career ==
=== 1997–2004: Early roles ===
Paxton has said that singing and acting performances "went hand in hand" during her early years, though she initially began working as an actress appearing in musical theater and later in television commercials at a young age. Her first film role was a small role in the 1997 comedy film Liar Liar. During the late 1990s and early 2000s, she appeared in a number of television and film roles, including voice roles in 15 episodes of the Nickelodeon animated series SpongeBob SquarePants, a role on the soap opera Passions, regular roles on the series Greetings from Tucson and Action; and a guest starring role on Disney Channel's Lizzie McGuire playing Holly, an ex-president of Lizzie's school. In 2002, she starred as a child abuse victim in "Burden of Proof", a season two episode of CSI: Crime Scene Investigation.

In 2003, Paxton starred in R. L. Stine's Haunted Lighthouse, a short 3D film attraction. In the same year, she appeared as Lana Walker on the CSI: Miami season two episode "Death Grip". Paxton's first major role was in the teen film Sleepover, which opened in July 2004 to negative reviews and low box-office revenue. During the same summer season, she appeared in several episodes of Summerland, playing Sarah Borden, a mentally troubled teen who used drugs and had sex with Jesse McCartney's character.

Paxton was the cast in the lead role of the Discovery Kids television series, Darcy's Wild Life playing Darcy Fields, a girl who works at a rural veterinary clinic; the series was filmed on a farm in Toronto and aired from 2004 to 2006. It often featured Paxton's song, "Take a Walk." She was nominated for an Emmy Award for the role in 2006.

=== 2005–2012: Mainstream recognition ===
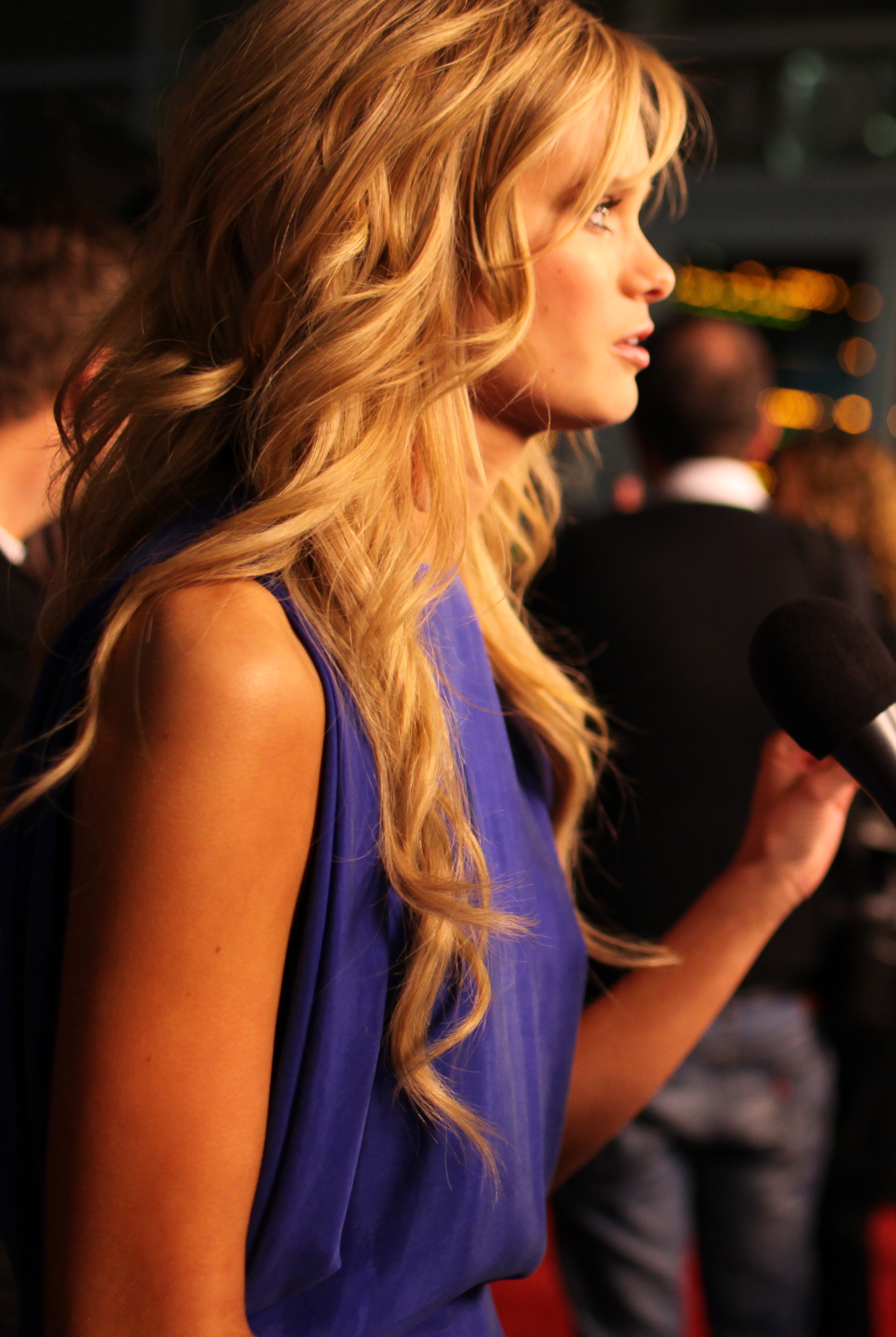
Paxton at the premiere of The Last House on the Left in 2009

In 2005, Paxton spent three months working on the Florida-themed Aquamarine, in which she played the title character as a mermaid, opposite Emma Roberts and JoJo, whom she befriended while filming. Paxton has said that she felt a sense of "female empowerment" while on set because "almost everyone" on set was female. The film opened on March 3, 2006, and grossed approximately $7.5 million in its opening weekend. Paxton recorded a song for the film's soundtrack titled "Connected," an English version of Mexican group RBD's song "Tenerte y Quererte" from their 2004 album Rebelde. Paxton was signed to a record deal with Epic Records during the time she was cast in Aquamarine. Her debut music CD, The Ups and Downs, featuring the titled single "Here We Go Again," was due for release by Epic at some point "in the future"; as of March 2007, Paxton had not completed work on it, and it was presumably shelved.

Paxton hosted "The Secret Life of Water," the first episode of the series Planet H_{2}O, which premiered in April 2006 on public television stations. The following month, shortly after turning 18, she made an appearance on the television series Pepper Dennis, playing a teen actress. Paxton then appeared in Return to Halloweentown (replacing Kimberly J. Brown) in the fourth installment in Disney Channel's Halloweentown series; she dyed her hair brown for the role. The film aired on October 20, 2006.

During the summer and early fall of 2006, Paxton filmed The Party Never Stops: Diary of a Binge Drinker, a Lifetime Television film, on Vancouver Island. In the film, she plays Jessie, a college student who falls victim to binge drinking. Paxton described it as "very different" from her previous roles and has specified that she was looking for a role that would be a "challenge." The film aired in March 2007.

Paxton's next film role was in Sydney White, a college-set comedy starring Amanda Bynes and Matt Long; filming began on February 12, 2007, in Orlando, Florida and the film was released on September 21. She next starred in Superhero Movie, a parody on superhero films which began filming in September 2007 and was released on March 28, 2008. She provided backing vocals on her co-star Drake Bell's theme song for the movie Superhero! Song.

In 2009, Paxton starred in Dennis Iliadis's The Last House on the Left, a remake of the 1972 film of the same title, playing the lead female character, Mari Collingwood.

=== 2013–present: television roles and film ===
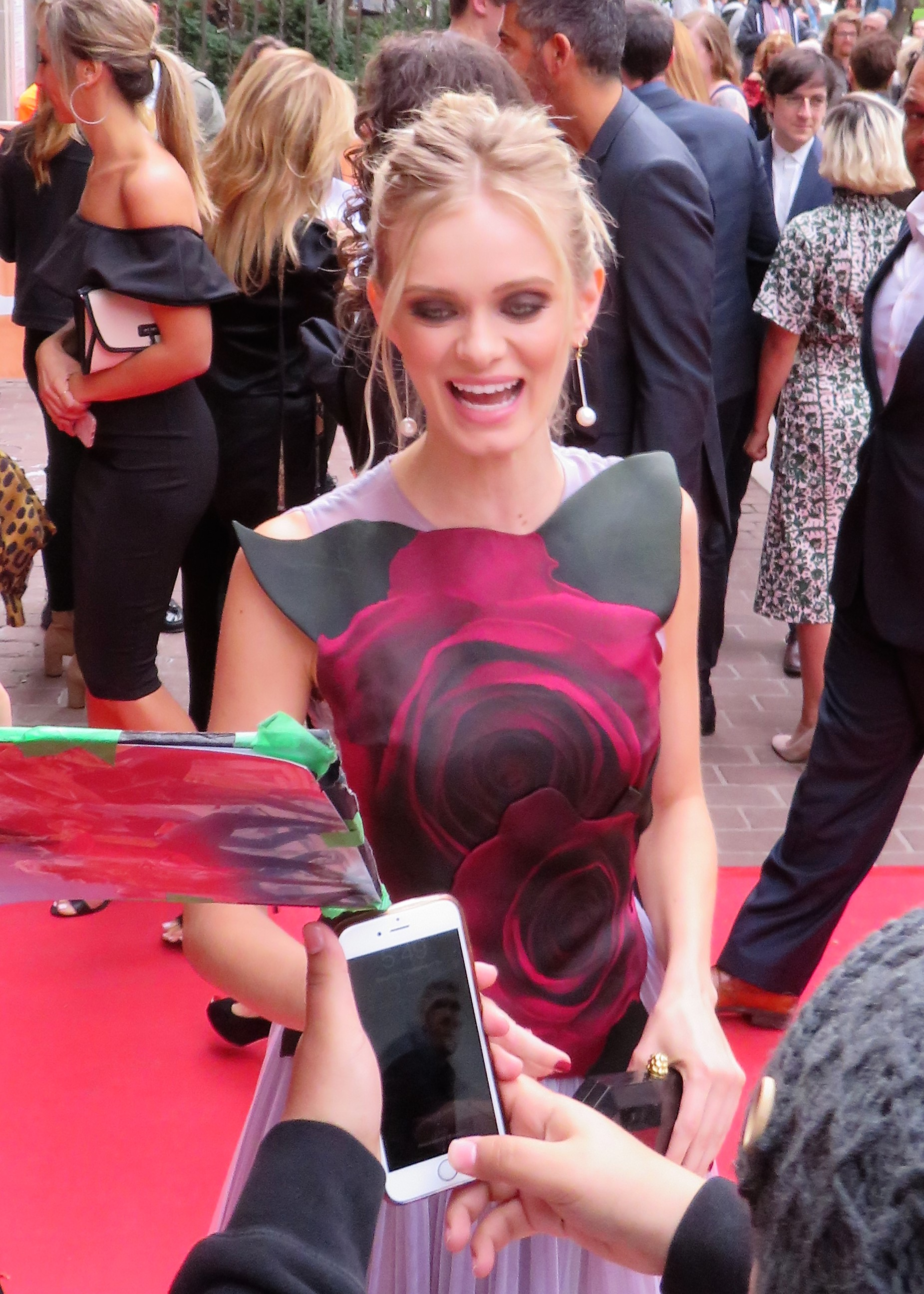
Paxton at the Toronto Film Festival premiere of The Front Runner in 2018

Paxton starred in The CW drama series The Beautiful Life alongside Corbin Bleu, Mischa Barton and Elle Macpherson. The show premiered on September 16, 2009, but was canceled after just two episodes. It aired later online on YouTube. Paxton next co-starred with Scott Eastwood in the thriller Enter Nowhere; she also played one of the lead roles in the Ti West film The Innkeepers.

She starred in the 2011 film Shark Night. She then played Mirabella on the ABC Family movie Lovestruck: The Musical in 2013. In April 2016, Paxton joined the cast of David Lynch's 2017 Twin Peaks revival.

In 2018, she co-starred as Donna Rice opposite Hugh Jackman in Jason Reitman's The Front Runner, a biographical film about politician Gary Hart. In 2018–2019, she played Amber Dooley in the NBC series Good Girls.

Paxton had a supporting role in Andrew Dominik's Blonde (2022), a fictionalized portrayal of the life and career of actress Marilyn Monroe based on the novel of the same name by Joyce Carol Oates.

Paxton had a small supporting role which she referred to as a "sneaky cameo" in Zach Cregger's Weapons (2025), having also voiced roles in Cregger's previous film Barbarian (2022). She would later appear in a voice-only role as Michelle, the pregnant girlfriend of main character Bryan, in Cregger's next film Resident Evil (2026).

In August 2026, Paxton starred on Lifetime's thriller film Killer Clown.

== Personal life ==
In 2012, Paxton met actor and filmmaker Zach Cregger on the set of Love & Air Sex (2013), in which they portrayed a couple. They married in Austin, Texas in October 2019.

== Filmography ==
=== Film ===
Year	Title	Role	Notes
1997	Liar Liar	Child at Party and School	
1997	You're Invited to Mary-Kate & Ashley's Christmas Party	Patty	Short film
1998	Music from Another Room	Young Karen	
1998	Soldier	Angie	
1998	Tunnel Vision	Shauna	Short film
1999	Durango Kids	Hillary	
1999	The Ruby Princess Runs Away	Princess Sabrina	
2003	Haunted Lighthouse	Ashley	Short film
2004	Sleepover	Staci Blake	
2006	Aquamarine	Aquamarine, Aquamarine's Starfish Earrings	
2007	Sydney White	Rachel Witchburn	
2008	Superhero Movie	Jill Johnson	
2009	The Last House on the Left	Mari Collingwood	
2011	The Innkeepers	Claire	
2011	Shark Night	Sara Palski	
2011	Enter Nowhere	Jody	
2012	Static	Rachel	
2013	Love & Air Sex	Kara	
2013	Cheap Thrills	Violet	
2013	Liars All	Katie	
2014	Boys of Abu Ghraib	Peyton	
2014	All Relative	Grace	
2016	Happily Ever After	Sarah Ann	
2016	Sundown	Lina Hunter	
2017	Three Women	Kathy	Short film
2018	First Date	Kathy	Short film
2018	The Front Runner	Donna Rice	
2022	Blonde	Miss Flynn	
2022	Barbarian	Nursing Video Narration / Assistant / Megan	Voice
2024	Roger is a Serial Killer	Annie	Short film
2024	The Writer	Zoe	Short film
2025	Leads	Mercy Donavan	
2025	Weapons	Erica	
2026	Resident Evil	Michelle	Voice

=== Television ===
Year	Title	Role	Notes
1996	Small Talk	Panelist #1	Recurring role; 10 episodes
1997	NewsRadio	Sara	Episode: "Office Feud"
1999	Working	Amanda Baines	Episode: "The Prodigy"
1999	Passions	Young Sheridan	Episode #1.14
1999	Action	Georgia Dragon	Guest role; 2 episodes
1999–2004, 2017	SpongeBob SquarePants	Various roles (voice)	Recurring role; 15 episodes
2000	Perfect Game	Sydney	Television film
2000	Beyond Belief: Fact or Fiction	Girl	Episode: "The Wailing"
2001	Hounded	Tracy Richburg	Television film
2001	Lizzie McGuire	Holly	Episode: "Election"
2002	CSI: Crime Scene Investigation	Jody Bradley	Episode: "Burden of Proof"
2002–2003	Greetings from Tucson	Sarah Tobin	Recurring role; 21 episodes
2003	CSI: Miami	Lana Walker	Episode: "Death Grip"
2004	Malcolm in the Middle	Angela Pozefsky	Episode: "Malcolm Dates a Family"
2004	Will & Grace	Melanie	Episode: "I Never Cheered for My Father"
2004	Summerland	Sarah Borden	Recurring role; 5 episodes
2004	Quintuplets	Chelsea	Episode: "Date Night"
2004–2006	Darcy's Wild Life	Darcy Fields	Main role; 33 episodes
2006	Pepper Dennis	April May/Chrissy Tyler	Episode: "Celebrity Twin Could Hang: Film at Eleven"
2006	Skater Boys	Kayla Gordon	Episode: "Sundown"
2006	Return to Halloweentown	Marnie Piper/Splendora Agatha Cromwell	Television film; replacing Kimberly J. Brown as Marnie Piper
2007	The Party Never Stops: Diary of a Binge Drinker	Jessie Brenner	Television film
2008	Wizards of Waverly Place	Millie	Episode: "Credit Check"
2009	Jonas	Fiona Skye	Episode: "Frantic Romantic"
2009	The Beautiful Life	Raina Marrinelli	Main role; 5 episodes
2012	Blue Eyed Butcher	Susan Wright	Television film
2013	Lovestruck: The Musical	Mirabella Hutton	Television film
2013	Guys with Kids	Stacee	Episode: "Gary's Idea"
2014	How to Get Away with Murder	Natalia "Talia" Lewis	Episode: "Let's Get to Scooping"
2014	Mi$Match	Kate	Television film
2015	Stalker	Isabelle Martin	Episode: "Salvation"
2015	Code Black	Sophie	Episode: "You Are the Heart"
2016	Heartbeat	Lou Panttiere	Episode: "The Land of Normal"
2016	Murder in the First	Alicia Barnes	Recurring role; 10 episodes
2017	This Is Us	Kathryn	Episode: "Moonshadow"
2017	Twin Peaks	Candy Shaker	Episode: "Part 4"
2017	Baker Daily: Trump Takedown	Sara	Television short
2017	Wrecked	Sister Grace	Episode: "Sister Mercy"
2018	Liberty Crossing	Jessica Larson	Episode: "Weekend Warriors"
2018–2019	Good Girls	Amber Dooley	Guest role; 3 episodes
2024	Based on a True Story	Paige	Recurring role; 4 episodes
2024	NCIS	Amber Carnahan	Episode: "Hardboiled"
2026	Grey's Anatomy	Leticia Gregory	Guest role; 2 episodes
2026	Killer Clown	Elizabeth Helmer	Television film

=== Video game ===
Year	Title	Voice role	Notes
1999	Koudelka	Charlotte D'lota	English dub

== Discography ==
=== Soundtrack appearances ===
Year	Song	Soundtrack
2005	"Take a Walk"	Darcy's Wild Life
2005	"There for You"	Darcy's Wild Life
2005	"Don't Wanna Be Alone" (with Jesse McCartney)	Summerland
2006	"Connected"	Aquamarine
2006	"Can You Feel The Love Tonight"	Disneymania 4
2008	"I Need a Hero"	Superhero! Movie
2008	"Superhero! Song (featuring Sara Paxton)	Superhero! Movie
2012	"Shark Bite Rap"	Shark Night 3D
2013	"Me Too (Stripped)"	Lovestruck: The Musical
2013	"Like a Virgin"	Lovestruck: The Musical
2013	"How Can I Remember to Forget"	Lovestruck: The Musical
2013	"Me Too (Main Mix)"	Lovestruck: The Musical
2013	"Everlasting Love"	Lovestruck: The Musical

=== Single appearances ===
Year	Song
2005	"Here We Go Again"

== Awards and nominations ==
Year	Association	Category	Work	Result
2000	Young Artist Awards	Best Performance in a TV Comedy Series – Young Performer Age Ten or Under	Working	Won
2003	Young Artist Awards	Best Performance in a TV Series (Comedy or Drama) – Supporting Young Actress	Greetings from Tucson	Nominated
2003	Young Artist Awards	Best Performance in a TV Drama Series – Guest Starring Young Actress	CSI: Crime Scene Investigation	Won
2004	Young Artist Awards	Best Performance in a TV Series – Guest Starring Young Actress	CSI: Miami	Nominated
2005	Young Artist Awards	Best Performance in a TV Series (Comedy or Drama) – Leading Young Actress	Darcy's Wild Life	Nominated
2005	Young Artist Awards	Best Performance in a Feature Film – Young Ensemble Cast	Sleepover	Nominated
2006	Young Artist Awards	Best Young Ensemble Performance in a TV Series (Comedy or Drama)	Darcy's Wild Life	Nominated
2006	Daytime Emmy Awards	Outstanding Performer in a Children's Series	Darcy's Wild Life	Nominated
2007	Young Artist Awards	Best Young Ensemble Performance in a TV Series (Comedy or Drama)	Darcy's Wild Life	Nominated
2007	Young Artist Awards	Best Performance in a Feature Film – Leading Young Actress	Aquamarine	Nominated
2012	Fright Meter Awards	Best Actress	The Innkeepers	Nominated
