= The Party Never Stops: Diary of a Binge Drinker =

- Written by: Matt Dorff
- Directed by: David Wu
- Starring: Sara Paxton; Michael Ian Farrell; Alexia Fast; Chelsea Hobbs; Nancy Travis
- Country of origin: United States
- Original language: English

Production
- Producer: Ted Bauman
- Running time: 90 minutes

Original release
- Network: Lifetime
- Release: 2007

The Party Never Stops: Diary of a Binge Drinker is a 2007 television film starring Sara Paxton, Michael Ian Farrell, Alexia Fast, Chelsea Hobbs and Nancy Travis. It was directed by David Wu and written by Matt Dorff. The movie premiered on Lifetime Television.

== Plot ==
This movie is about a blonde, blue-eyed, "All-American" 18-year-old girl named Jesse Brenner and her experiences as a college freshman. While she moves away to college for her first year, Jesse struggles with drinking and often finds herself giving into the pressures of her peers. She becomes enamored with the same party lifestyle that her female peers have all taken a liking to and gradually starts paying more attention to partying than she does schoolwork and athletics. As a result, her relationship with her mother suffers, as well as her grades. She finds herself lying, sleeping with different men, drinking and driving, and pushing away the people who care about her.

Angry and concerned, her mother warns Jesse that if she continues to drink and behave carelessly, she will be out of school. That means her mother will cut Jesse off financially if she does not get her act together. Affected by the warning and realizing what's best for her, she stops drinking for a while, and directs her attention back to school; until she goes to San Diego, CA. On her trip, she gets really drunk and faces the world - topless, on a TV program similar to Girls Gone Wild. Following this wild vacation, Jesse receives a call from her sister, letting her know that some guys at school were making fun of her for seeing her topless on spring break. Sadie, Jesse's younger sister, shows their mother the video, who consults her best friend about her daughter's erratic and extreme behaviors. Her friend then remarks that Jesse is a binge drinker. Her mother saw the tape and plays the tough mom card. She also warns Jess, she will be no longer going to pay her tuition, if she doesn't straightened herself out and doesn't get her grades up. That is when they became estranged. Jess was partying in a frat house and moved a car, hit a fire hydrant. Luckily no one was hurt and got probation from the college. She and her mother reconciled and mostly her mother was sorry for playing the mom card and wants to help her get through this. Jess straightened up her life and got back in track in college and got her grades up.

On the last day of the semester, Jesse's roommate Shanna goes to a college party after drinking on the roof of the building. Jesse stays the night at her boyfriend's house and returns to her dorm in the morning. Upon arrival, Jesse realizes that Shanna is gone and is still at the frat house where she spent the night. When Jessie finds Shanna she tries to wake her up and realizes that she is not just sleeping; she is dead. Shanna's lifeless body lay on the couch, unbeknownst to her peers, who were with her the night before and assumed she was just sleeping. The college holds a candlelight service after Jesse tells Shanna's parents how it all happened. After the service, life continues on as usual, but Jesse learns a lot and keeps in mind the dangers of binge drinking and what happened to her good friend. It ends with her playing the recording of Shanna's voice while going for a jog.

== Characters ==
Jesse Brenner Jesse is a college freshman. Prior to post-secondary school, she was well behaved and largely considered a "good girl". She had a strong relationship with her mother and was a promising long distance track runner. She shares a dorm room with a party girl named Shanna. The two form a strong bond that extends beyond their drinking. Jesse is often faced with the pressure of drinking and as a result, gives into it. There is a constant struggle between the expectations of her mother and the pressures of her friends; her friends usually win.

April Brenner Jesse's mother. April's husband died less than a year ago and as a result, she has a very strong bond with Jesse. She is trying to deal with her daughter going away to school. It is like a second loss in her life. She is often shown being very concerned about Jesse and suspects that something is wrong with her. When April learns of Jesse's drinking, she begins researching binge drinking and becomes a support system for her daughter and helps her to get over her problem.

Sadie Brenner Sadie is Jesse's younger sister. She has little air time. It is clear that she did not think that her sister had a problem originally because she was such a "good girl'" before.

Shanna Shanna is Jesse's roommate. She is not new to partying and as a result can often control herself better than Jesse. However, Shanna succumbs to the dangers of binge drinking and dies of alcohol poisoning at the end of the film. She is discovered by Jesse, lying dead on a couch in a frat house after a night of binge drinking.

Colin He is one of Jesse's classmates who later becomes a good friend and then a love interest. He doesn't party. It is later revealed that he doesn't party because at one point, he took it too far and as result lost his scholarship, job, girlfriend, and future. He recognizes Jesse's dangerous behaviour and helps her get her life in order.

Tyler Tyler is the old-looking male at the Sigma Phi parties. He lets Jesse drive his car because he is too drunk to drive and she runs into a fire hydrant.

Liz One of Jesse's drinking buddies who lives down the hall in the same dorm. She likes to party and is responsible for giving Jesse her first sip of Champagne. She refers to her friends as "my girls" instead of by their first names.
