= David Robinson (film critic) =

English film critic and author

David Robinson (born 6 August 1930 in Lincoln) is an English film critic and author. He is a former film critic for both the Financial Times and The Times and wrote the official biography of Charlie Chaplin.

== Life ==
Robinson began to write for Sight and Sound and the Monthly Film Bulletin during the 1950s, becoming assistant editor of Sight and Sound and editor of the Monthly Film Bulletin from 1957 to 1958. He was film critic of the Financial Times from 1958 to 1973, before taking up the same post at The Times in 1973. He remained the paper's main film reviewer until around 1990 and a regular contributor until around 1996.

From 1997 to 2015, he was director of the Giornate del cinema muto silent film festival, which takes place in Pordenone, northern Italy, every October. Robinson is also a supporter of the UK-based silent-film society Bristol Silents and the annual Slapstick comedy festival, also based in Bristol and usually held in January (the 2021 festival took place online in March). He played a part in the creation of the award-winning Museum of the Moving Image on London's South Bank which opened in 1988 and closed in 1999.

In 1973, he was head of the jury at the 23rd Berlin International Film Festival. In 1995 he was a member of the jury at the 19th Moscow International Film Festival.

He lives in Bath, Somerset.

In 2019 he appeared in Chris Wade's documentary Charlie Chaplin: The Making of a Genius.

== Works ==
Robinson's books include Hollywood in the Twenties (1968) and The History of World Cinema (1973) which was expanded and revised as World Cinema: A Short History (World Cinema 1895-1980 on the cover, 1981). Robinson is the official biographer of Charlie Chaplin and his book, Chaplin: His Life and Art, was first published in 1985 (in a revised form in 1992 and 2001). An illustrated biography entitled Charlie Chaplin: The Art of Comedy was published by Thames & Hudson in 1996, as part of their 'New Horizons' series. (Note: The book has been published in French entitled Charlot : Entre rire et larme (1995), as 245th volume in the collection "Découvertes Gallimard". The American edition Charlie Chaplin: Comic Genius, from "Abrams Discoveries" series, also released in 1996.) He has also written a book on Buster Keaton.

For the centenary of cinema in 1995, Robinson wrote The Chronicle of Cinema 1895-1995, a 127-page introduction to film history. This was serialised in the form of five supplementary magazines accompanying Sight and Sound from September 1994 to January 1995.
